= Mékinac =

Mékinac may refer to:

- Mékinac Regional County Municipality, Quebec
- Saint-Roch-de-Mékinac, Quebec, a parish municipality
- Saint-Joseph-de-Mékinac, Quebec, a former municipality in the administrative region of Mauricie, Quebec, whose territory was merged with the municipality of Trois-Rives
- Mékinac River, a tributary of the Saint-Maurice River in Quebec
- North Mékinac River, a tributary of Rivière des Envies, in Mauricie, Quebec
- South Mékinac River, a tributary of North Mékinac River, in Mauricie, Quebec
- Mékinac Lake, in the administrative region of Mauricie, Quebec
- Mékinac Dam, Québec
- Mékinac (township)

== See also ==
- Mackinac (disambiguation)
- Michilimackinac, a historic term for the entire region around the Straits of Mackinac
- Fort Michilimackinac, a fort on the south side of the straits
