= Mackinac =

Mackinac or Mackinaw may refer to:

== Geography ==
=== Landforms ===
- Straits of Mackinac, a waterway in the U.S. state of Michigan connecting two of the Great Lakes, Lake Michigan and Lake Huron and separating the Upper and Lower Peninsulas of Michigan
- Mackinac Island, an island in the Straits of Mackinac
- Mackinaw River, a tributary of the Illinois River in the U.S. state of Illinois
- Little Mackinaw River, a tributary of the Mackinaw River

=== Populated areas ===
- Mackinac County, Michigan
- Mackinac Island, Michigan, the city on Mackinac Island
- Mackinaw Township, Michigan, in Cheboygan County
- Mackinaw City, Michigan, a village in Mackinaw Township
- Mackinaw Township, Tazewell County, Illinois
- Mackinaw, Illinois, a village in Mackinaw Township
- Little Mackinaw Township, Tazewell County, Illinois
- Mackinaw Historic District, a historic residential area in Franklin, Ohio

=== Structures and places ===
- Mackinac Bridge, a bridge over the Straits of Mackinac
- Old Mackinac Point Lighthouse, a lighthouse in Mackinaw City
- Fort Mackinac, a British, later American, fort on Mackinac Island
- Mackinac Island State Park, a state park on Mackinac Island
- Straits of Mackinac Shipwreck Preserve, a state-designated preservation area within much of the Straits of Mackinac
- Mackinac Wilderness, a designated area within the Hiawatha National Forest in Mackinac County, Michigan
- Mackinac Trail (or Mackinaw Trail), two related, but separate, roadways in Michigan
- Mackinac Trail – Carp River Bridge, a bridge along the Mackinac Trail over the Carp River in Mackinac County
- Mackinaw State Forest, a state-owned forested area in the northern Lower Peninsula of Michigan
- Mackinaw River State Fish and Wildlife Area, a state park in Tazewell County, Illinois, bisected by the Mackinaw River

== Corporations and organizations ==
- Cincinnati, Jackson and Mackinaw Railroad, a railroad that formerly operated in Ohio and Michigan
- Detroit and Mackinac Railway, a railroad that formerly operated in Michigan
- Mackinac Center for Public Policy, a research and educational organization advocating free-market policies
- Mackinac Financial Corporation, a bank holding company
- Mackinac Island State Park Commission, an appointed board that administers state parklands in the Straits of Mackinac area
- Mackinac Transportation Company, a train ferry service that shuttled railroad cars across the Straits of Mackinac from 1882 until 1984

== Ships ==
- USCGC Mackinac, several ships of the United States Coast Guard
- USCGC Mackinaw, several ships of the United States Coast Guard
- USRC Mackinac (1903) or USCGC Mackinac, a patrol boat
- USS Mackinac, several ships of the United States Navy
- USS Mackinaw, a United States Navy gunboat commissioned twice between 1864 and 1867

== Sailing ==
- Mackinaw boat, a type of small sailboat used in the Upper Great Lakes
- Port Huron to Mackinac Boat Race
- Chicago Yacht Club Race to Mackinac

== Other uses ==
- Mackinaw cloth, a heavy and dense water-repellent woolen cloth
- Mackinaw jacket, a short double-breasted wool coat
- Mackinaw trout or Lake trout
- Mackinac Rendezvous, an annual Boy Scouts of America event held in the Straits of Mackinac area
- Mackinac Republican Leadership Conference (also known as the Midwest Mackinac Republican Leadership Conference), a biannual political conference held on Mackinac Island
- Mackinac Policy Conference, an annual political and economic conference held on Mackinac Island
- Mackinac Island meteorite, a meteorite found on the planet Mars by the Opportunity rover on October 13, 2009

== See also ==
- Mackinawite, an iron nickel sulfide mineral
- Michilimackinac, a former term for the entire region around the Straits of Mackinac
- Fort Michilimackinac, a French, later British, fort and trading post on the northern tip of Michigan's Lower Peninsula at the Straits of Mackinac
- Mékinac (disambiguation)
