= Rivière-Matawin, Quebec =

Coordinates: 46.9147°N 72.9269°W

The hamlet Matawin River (popularly designated "Mattawin") is located on the east bank of the Saint-Maurice River, in Trois-Rives, in Mékinac Regional County Municipality, in Mauricie, in Quebec, in Canada. In the past, Matawin River was a municipality. Today, the territory of Matawin hamlet is a sector incorporated to the municipality of Trois-Rives.

== Geography ==
More specifically, this hamlet is located in Row II (South West), in the former Lordship of Batiscan. This hamlet is positioned in front of the Matawin island, 3.8 km upstream of the Five Island, 8.2 km upstream legendary Manigonce rapids and 18.4 km upstream of the mouth the Mékinac River. The mouth of the river Matawin is located one kilometer south of the island Matawin the Saint-Maurice River.

Due to its geographical position, along Quebec route 155, halfway between Grand-Mère and La Tuque, this resort offers access to various wildlife areas such as the Saint-Maurice Wildlife Reserve. Several providers offer hosting services and tourist activities.

== History ==
The colonization of the territory began in the mid of 19th century, when the logging rights begin to be granted in Middle and Upper Mauricie by the Government of Quebec. Forestry has been the engine of Matawin economic development. In the 20th century, tourist activities (hunting, fishing, camping, boating, mountain biking, snowmobiles, observations of nature...) have grown considerably.

In 1993, a bridge crossing Saint-Maurice River, was built near the mouth of Matawin River, in order to give access to zec du Chapeau-de-Paille and to Saint-Maurice Wildlife Reserve. This new bridge replaced the old ferry.

In 1996, the Saint-Maurice River was the last river of the province of Quebec to stop the transportation of timber by flotation on water. For nearly 150 years, forest companies have used the current of the river and its tributaries for timber transportation. Before being stacked on the ice in Upper-Mauricie, logs were identified in order to be recovered easily downstream, at different "baunes" crossing the river, including at La Tuque, Grandes-Piles, Grand-Mère, Shawinigan or Trois-Rivières. The end of the log drives on the river led to a rapid expansion of water activities.

At the beginning of the colonization of the area, pioneers were mainly established on the west bank of the Saint-Maurice River, because of the quality of land for agriculture. The construction of the road from Grand-Mère to La Tuque rather attracted families to settle on the eastern shore.

The name Matawin refers to the river of the same name.

== See also ==
=== Related articles ===
- Matawin River
- Saint-Maurice River
- Mauricie
- Trois-Rives
- Saint-Maurice Wildlife Reserve
- Matawinie
- Grande-Anse (Mékinac), hamlet

=== External links ===
- "Municipality of Trois-Rives" (in French).
