= Missionary Lake =

Lake in Trois-Rives, Quebec, Canada

Missionary lake
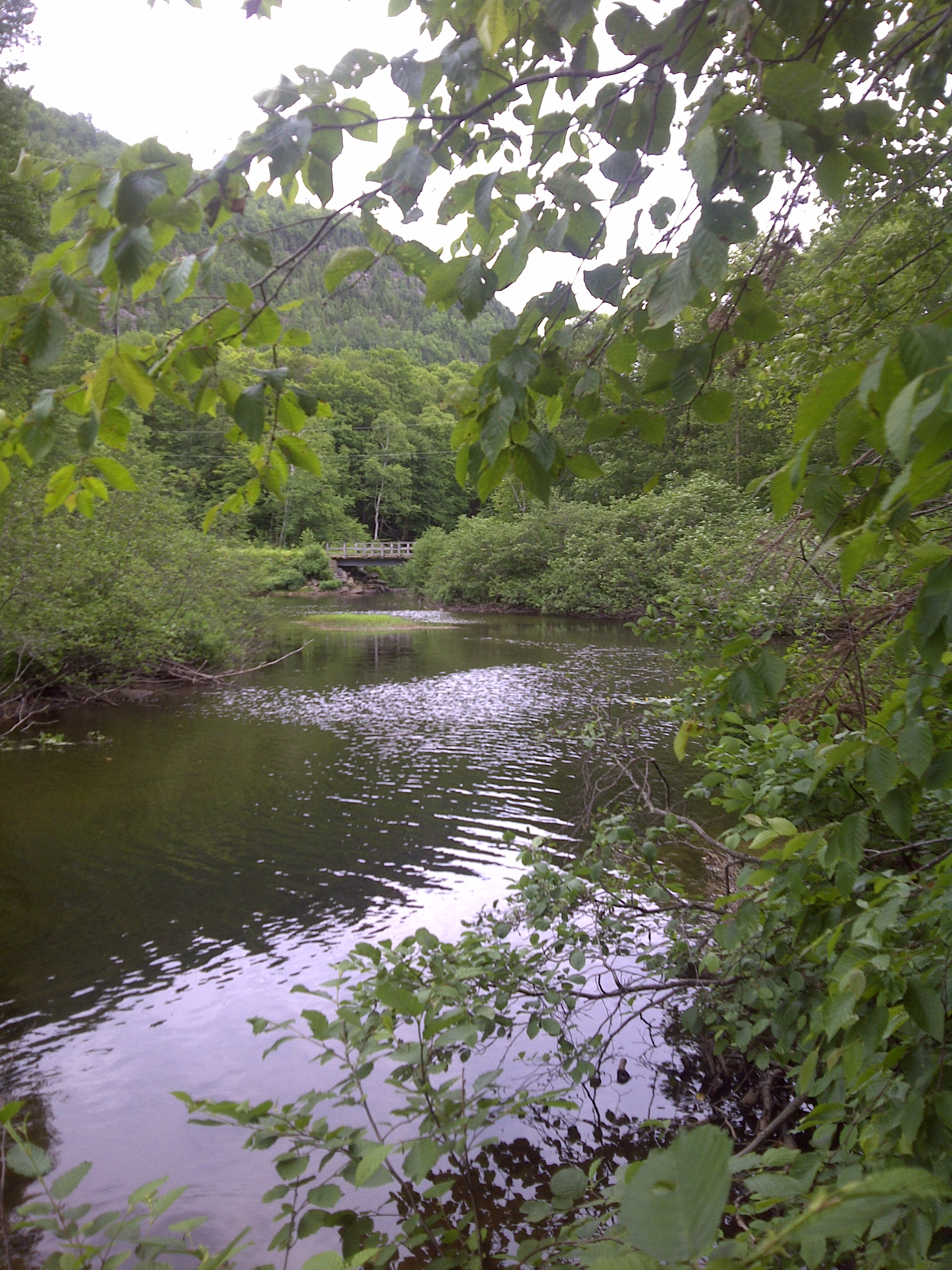
- "Passe à Groleau" (Groleau Strait) separating the northern and southern parts of Missionary lake. The bridge (in background) serves cottages located on the northeast shore, in the middle of the "Missionary lake".

- Missionary Lake in Quebec
- Location: Quebec, Canada
- Coordinates: 46°55′00″N 72°33′37″W
- Type: natural
- Primary inflows: surrounding streams
- Primary outflows: Discharge toward Mékinac Lake
- Basin countries: Quebec, Canada
- Max. length: 13 km (8.1 mi)
- Max. width: 1.2 km (1 mi)
- Surface area: 5.93 km^{2} (2.29 sq mi)
- Max. depth: 61 m (200 ft)
- Surface elevation: 167 m (548 ft)
- Settlements: Trois-Rives, Lac-aux-Sables

Missionary Lake [formerly named "Grand lac long" (Grand Long Lake)] is located in the municipalities of Trois-Rives and Lac-aux-Sables in the Mekinac Regional County Municipality (RCM), in Batiscanie, in the administrative area of the Mauricie, in the province of Quebec, Canada. It is named in honour of missionary and explorer Paul Le Jeune, one of the founders of the Jesuit mission that was opened in 1634 in nearby Trois-Rivières, Quebec.

== History ==
In Aboriginal history, the Mekinac River and Missionary Lake together served as paths between the Saint-Maurice River and Batiscan River. In winter, this route was also very useful for forest contractors using horse-drawn sleighs to access logging areas around Missionary Lake or Mekinac Lake. The need for this path for forestry was greatly reduced when a railway was completed in 1908 in the nearby Tawachiche sector connecting Hervey-Jonction to La Tuque. Today, this Mekinac/Missionary route is used recreationally by snowmobiles and ATVs between early December and late March.

In 1938, the Groleau Company built a sawmill at the south end of Missionary Lake, 4.3 km from Hervey-Jonction. On June 27, 1955, the mill was destroyed by a fire. It was rebuilt in the village of Sainte-Thècle, opposite the train station and next to the Groleau factory.

Today, the region's economy is based on tourism and forestry. The area is suitable for hunting, fishing, camping, water activities, nature observation and gathering wild fruit.

== Geography ==
Missionary Lake is divided into two parts, north and south, which are interconnected by Groleau Strait which is 0.77 km in length. The southern part of Missionary Lake discharges into the northern part of the lake through the Groleau Strait. Small boats can navigate through the southern entrance to the strait. There is a wider channel of about 0.5 km long in the middle portion of the strait, but the strait otherwise is difficult to navigate, being narrow and shallow in places with stones at the bottom. The northern part of the strait entry requires a portage with a canoe. A bridge spans the strait at its northern portion to serve the cottages located on the northeast shore of the lake.

The south part of Missionary Lake is located partly in the municipality of Lac-aux-Sables (5th and 6th Row Price) and partly in Trois-Rives (from 1st row N.-E. to 5e row N.-E.). The Trois-Rives section was part of the unorganized region of Lac-Masketsi until August 28, 2004. The southern part of the lake is elongated along the north-south axis, with a length of 5.1 km and a maximum width of 0.5 km. The southern part of the lake is accessible by road from Hervey-Jonction's sector (in the municipality of Lac-aux-Sables), connected by Lac en coeur Road to Missionary Lake Road which runs along the south-western part of the lake. Missionary Lake Road continues beyond the Groleau strait, along the southwestern bank of North Missionary lake.

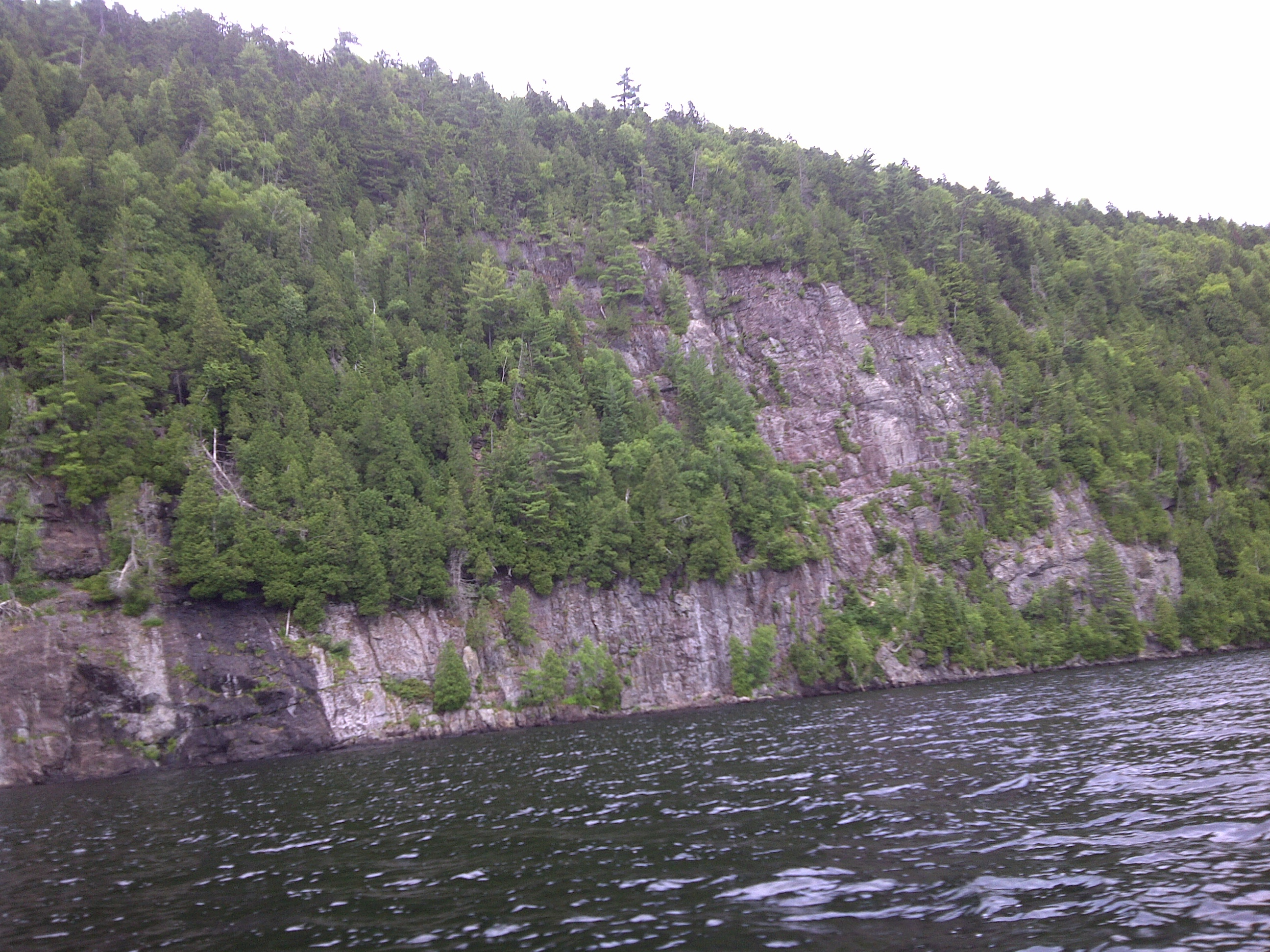
The north shore of the northern part of Lake Missionary has high cliffs

The northern part of Missionary Lake is elongated along the north-south axis, measuring 7.1 km in length and 1.2 km wide. Its discharge, at the northwest end of the lake, flows north and west 3.18 km to Mékinac Lake through several smaller lakes, the largest of which is Lac à la Puce. It discharges into Mékinac Lake, just upstream of the dam at the mouth of the latter lake.

The northern part of Missionary Lake is accessible by road from the village of Saint-Joseph-de-Mékinac in the Municipality of Trois-Rives, north along Lake Mékinac Road 8.5 km, then along Missionary Lake Road for 4.2 km.

== Toponymy ==
The name "Missionary Lake" was chosen to honour the Jesuit missionary Paul Le Jeune who came from France, and is one of the founders of the mission Trois-Rivières in 1634 and Ville-Marie (Montreal) in 1642. Paul Le Jeune was a great explorer of New France after the founding of Trois-Rivières. In the region of Sainte-Thècle, several sites are associated with his life's work: Canton Lejeune, Lac Lejeune and Lake Jesuit. In Saint-Tite, the École secondaire Paul Le Jeune (High School) which opened in 1969, also pays tribute to the missionary. The name "Missionary Lake" was recorded on December 5, 1968, at the Bank of place names of Commission de toponymie du Québec.

== See also ==
=== Related articles ===
- Mékinac River
- Du Missionnaire Lake
- Sainte-Thècle, Quebec
- Saint-Roch-de-Mékinac, Quebec
- Mékinac Regional County Municipality
- Mékinac dam (Québec)
- Trois-Rives, municipality
- Lac-aux-Sables, municipality
- Mékinac (township)
- Lac-Masketsi, Quebec, unorganized territory
