= Mongrain =

Mongrain may refer to:

- Bob Mongrain, Canadian hockey player
- Daniel Mongrain, Canadian musician
- Erik Mongrain, Canadian composer
- Guy Mongrain, Canadian TV host
- James Mongrain, American artist
- Jeffrey Mongrain, American artist and historian
- Jean-Luc Mongrain, Canadian journalist
- Joseph-Alfred Mongrain, Canadian politician
- Lucien Mongrain, Canadian politician
