= Grande-Anse, Quebec =

Coordinates: 47.090°N 72.919°W

Grande-Anse (French pronunciation: [ɡʁɑ̃dɑ̃s]) is a hamlet located along the Route 155 on the east bank of the Saint-Maurice River, in the municipality of Trois-Rives, in the Mekinac Regional County Municipality, in Mauricie, in Quebec, in Canada.

== Geography ==
This hamlet is located nearby the Saint-Maurice River, about fifty miles south of La Tuque, north of the mouth of Matawin River and south of the hamlet of Rivière-aux-Rats. Grand-Anse hamlet is also at 5 km north of hamlet Olscamp and north of hamlet Rivière Matawin (Hamlet).

Forming the western boundary of the Boucher Township, the Saint-Maurice River widens to form a half-moon at the height of Grande-Anse (hamlet). The curve of the river is designated Grande Anse since at least the mid-nineteenth century.

== History ==
Theodore Olschamp (1828-1878) and his family settled around 1863 in the area designated Grande-Anse. Already in 1865, the farm prospered thanks to the demand of the forest contractors who ascended the Saint-Maurice River, on the ice at the beginning of winter and coming back down to the spring with their herds of horses and workers. Mr. Olschamp was the first provider in the sector for agricultural products for forest workers coming from the "Lower Mauricie" to work in the logging concession in Upper-Mauricie. The family home constituted a halt (with lodging and meals) for travellers, while the horses were housed in public shelters or barn.

Some other pioneers established around their home and farm. In 1873 Olscamp had himself built a chapel on land granted to the mission of Grande-Anse. In 1878, Theodore Olschamp died by drowning in the Saint-Maurice River, as well as his wife and a young child who had been baptized. A widespread regional lament was composed especially for the memory of those three missing.

== Toponymy ==
In 1887, the Bishop of Trois-Rivières, lord Louis-François Richer Laflèche, officially designated the mission "Saint-Théodore-de-la-Grande-Anse”, in memory of the brave.

The designation "Grande Anse" was formalized on December 5, 1968, at the Bank of place names in Commission de toponymie du Québec.

Decimal coordinates: -72.91888; 47.08972

== See also ==
- Saint-Maurice River
- Trois-Rives, a municipality
- Mekinac Regional County Municipality (RCM)
- Mauricie, administrative region
- Rivière Matawin (Hamlet)
