= USS Mackinac =

USS Mackinac has been the name of more than one United States Navy ship, and may refer to:

- USS Mackinac (1917), a patrol boat in commission from 1917 to 1919
- USS Mackinac (AVP-13), a seaplane tender in commission from 1942 to 1947

See also

- USS Mackinaw
- USCGC Mackinac
- USCGC Mackinaw
