= Irénée-Marie Ecological Reserve =

Protected pine forest in Canada

- IUCN category Ia (strict nature reserve)
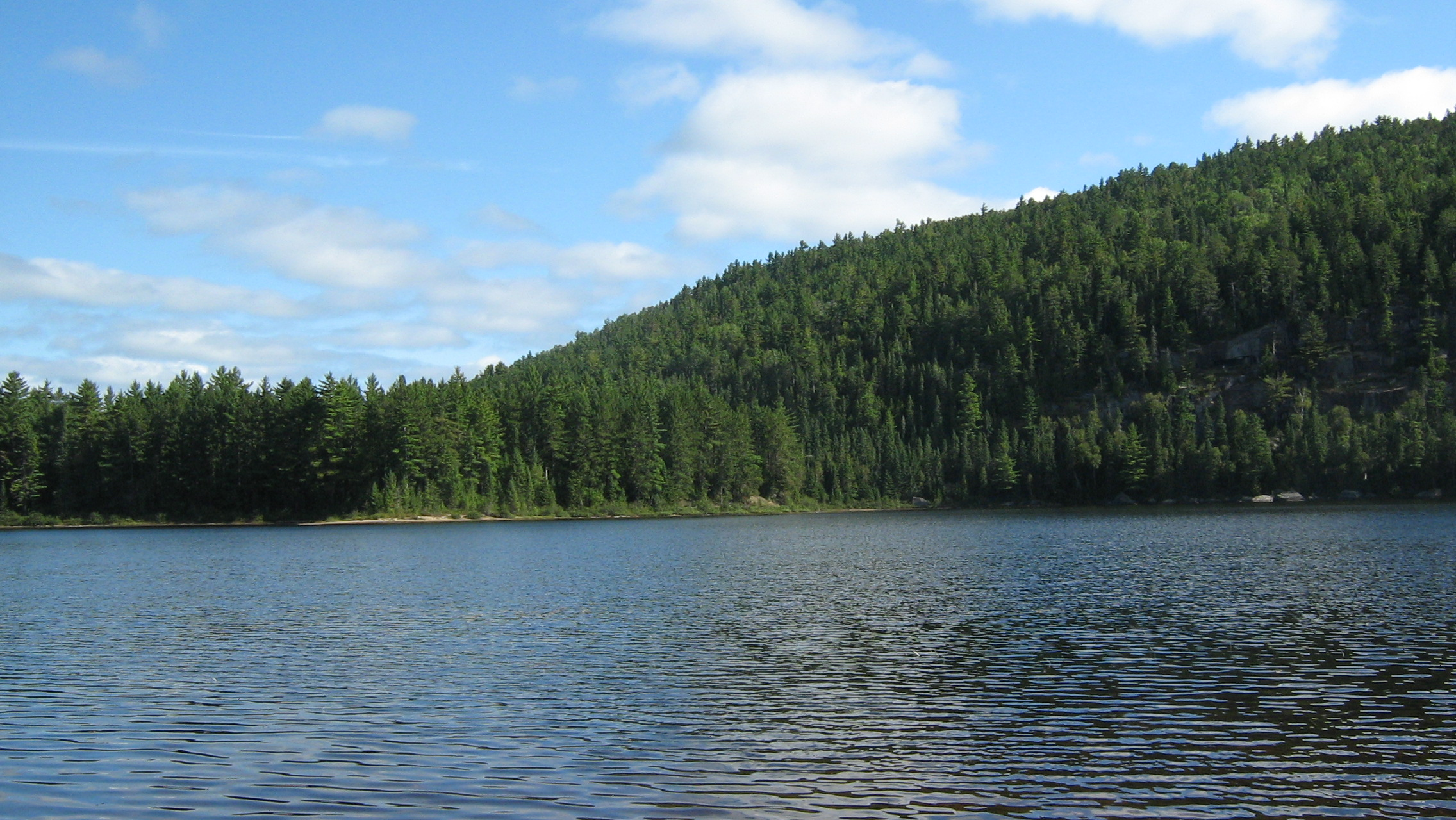

- Location within Quebec
- Location: Mékinac Regional County Municipality, Quebec, Canada
- Nearest city: Rivière-de-la-Savane
- Coordinates: 46°54′10″N 73°18′58″W
- Area: 189.36 hectares (467.92 acres)
- Established: October 31, 1985
- Website: www.mddep.gouv.qc.ca/biodiversite/reserves/irenee_marie/res_13.htm

Irénée-Marie Ecological Reserve (French: Réserve écologique Irénée-Marie) is an ecological reserve in the unorganized territory of Rivière-de-la-Savane, in Mékinac Regional County Municipality, in Quebec, Canada. It was established on October 31, 1985. The Ecological Reserve protects a forest of Eastern white pine, red pine and pine gray.

== Toponymy ==
The name commemorates Joseph Caron (1889-1960), better known as Brother Irénée-Marie of the Congregation of Christian Brothers, one of the colleagues of brother Marie-Victorin.

== Geography ==
The reserve is located approximately 50 kilometres (31 mi) west of Saint-Joseph-de-Mékinac, in the Matawin River drainage basin, and surrounded by the ZEC Chapeau de Paille.

It has an area of 189.36 hectares (467.92 acres) and is located north-east of Arcand lake and on either side of the des Aigles river. The elevation of the reserve varies between 290 metres (950 ft) on the edge Arcand Lake up to 490 metres (1,610 ft). It is generally formed by rocky slopes and a flat zone.

== History ==
In 1978, private clubs for hunting and fishing were abolished and replaced by zones d'exploitation contrôlée (harvested controlled zones) with the objective to democratise their activities. Consequently, the territory of the reserve was transferred to zec du Chapeau-de-Paille.

The Irenée-Marie ecological reserve was created on October 31, 1985 by a decree of the Quebec Government. It was the 13th ecological reserve to be created in Quebec.
