= Mékinac Dam =

- Missionary Lake in Quebec
- Official name: Barrage Mékinac
- Country: Canada
- Location: Trois-Rives, Quebec
- Coordinates: 46°58′32.27″N 72°39′15.44″W
- Purpose: Regulation
- Status: Operational

Dam and spillways
- Impounds: Mékinac River
- Height: 6.8 m (22 ft)
- Length: 122 m (400 ft)

Reservoir
- Creates: Mékinac Lake
- Total capacity: 95,317,615 m^{3} (77,275.248 acre⋅ft)
- Catchment area: 877.5 km^{2} (338.8 mi^{2})

The Mékinac Dam was built between 2010-2011 on the Mékinac River, creating Mékinac Lake in the municipality of Trois-Rives, in the Mékinac Regional County Municipality (RCM) in administrative region of Mauricie, in the province of Quebec, in Canada.

Water flow through the dam into the Mékinac River which empties 26 km further, into the Saint-Maurice River at Saint-Roch-de-Mékinac in Middle Mauricie. The dam is located about seven miles northeast of the village of Saint-Joseph-de-Mékinac and creates Mekinac tank (corresponding to Mékinac Lake), with a holding capacity 95,317,615 m³. The area of the tank is 2 296.8 ha. While the catchment area of 877.5 km²

This dam that was designed by Hydro-Quebec, has a length of 122 m., a height of 6.8 m., a retention height of 4.2 m. and a maximum discharge capacity of 232 m³/s.

The recro-tourism activities are very intense on this large body of water. The main purpose of the Mekinac dam is to regulate the water in Mékinac River and consequently the Saint-Maurice River, down to the hydro-dam of Grand-Mère, Shawinigan and La Gabelle.

== History ==
Dam built in 1971

The dam built in 1971 consisted of wooden boxes and has a length of 80 meters.

Dam built in 2010-2011

From August 2010 until early 2011, the "Mekinac dam", located at the head of the Mékinac River, was completely rebuilt by the construction firm CRT Quebec, which had won the contract from Hydro-Quebec, because this infrastructure was coming to the end of its lifespan. For the purposes of the construction, the water level was lowered of 2.5 m., compared to its usual level. Vacationers (about 170 chalets in the area), campers and boaters saw then floats settle on the sandy beaches. Then the old dam was demolished. The new dam whose longevity is estimated at 50 years, has two tailings dams, built with stone. The dam has a spillway located in its center, built of steel girders and concrete.

== Toponymy ==
The name "Mekinac dam" (barrage Mékinac, in French) was officially registered with the Bank of place names at Commission de toponymie du Québec (Geographical Names Board of Québec), on June 6, 1973.

== See also ==
- Mékinac (township)
- Missionary Lake
- Sainte-Thècle
- Trois-Rives
- Mauricie
- Saint-Roch-de-Mékinac
- Mékinac Regional County Municipality
