= Maciąg =

Maciąg is a Polish-language surname derived from an augmentative of a given name and which literally means "big Maciej". Notable people with this surname include:

== People with the surname ==
- Adam Maciąg (1879–1940), Polish general, victim of the Katyn massacre
- Agnieszka Maciąg (1969–2025), Polish model, writer, actress and journalist

== See also ==
- Mackinac (disambiguation)
