= USCGC Mackinac =

USCGC Mackinac has been the name of more than one United States Revenue Cutter Service and United States Coast Guard ship, and may refer to:

- USRC Mackinac (1903), a patrol boat which served in the Revenue Cutter Service from 1903 to 1915 and in the Coast Guard (as USCGC Mackinac) from 1915 to 1917 and from 1919 to 1939
- USCGC Mackinac (WAVP-371), later WHEC-371, a cutter in commission from 1949 to 1967

== See also ==
- USCGC Mackinaw
- USS Mackinac
- USS Mackinaw
