= Lac-Boulé =

- Unorganized territory
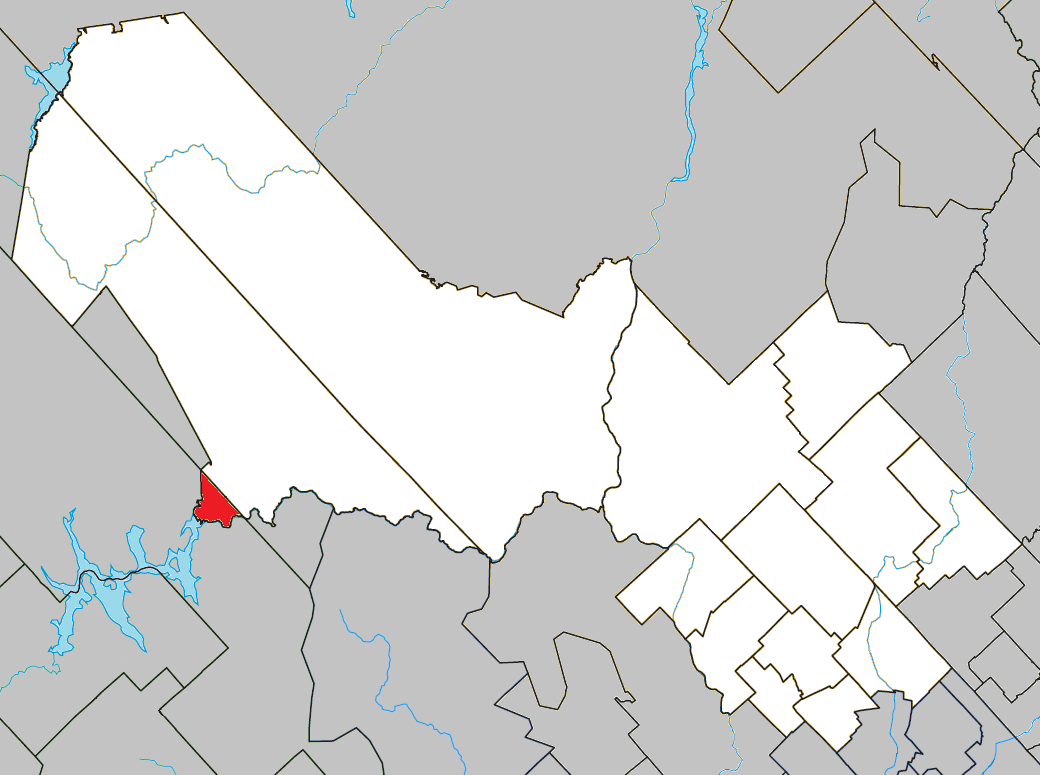
- Location within Mékinac RCM

- Location in central Quebec
- Coordinates: 46°53′N 73°37′W
- Country: Canada
- Province: Quebec
- Region: Mauricie
- RCM: Mékinac
- Constituted: March 13, 1986

Government
  - Fed. riding: Saint-Maurice—Champlain
  - Prov. riding: Laviolette

Area
  - Total: 24.46 km^{2} (9.44 sq mi)
  - Land: 22.95 km^{2} (8.86 sq mi)

Population (2021)
  - Total: 0
  - Density: 0/km^{2} (0/sq mi)
  - Change 2016-21: 0.0%
  - Dwellings: 6
- Time zone: UTC−5 (EST)
  - Summer (DST): UTC−4 (EDT)
- Highways: No major routes

Lac-Boulé (French pronunciation: [lak bule]) is an unorganized territory in the Mauricie region of Quebec, Canada, part of the Mékinac Regional County Municipality. It is named after Lake Boulé, located within the territory.

== Demographics ==
Historical census populations – Lac-Boulé
Year	Pop.	±%
1996	0	—
2001	0	0.00%
2006	0	0.00%
2011	0	0.00%
2016	0	0.00%
2021	0	0.00%
Source: Statistics Canada
