= USCGC Mackinaw =

USCGC Mackinaw has been the name of more than one United States Coast Guard ship, and may refer to:

- USCGC Mackinaw (WAGB-83), an icebreaker in commission from 1944 to 2006
- USCGC Mackinaw (WLBB-30), an icebreaker in commission since 2006

See also

- USCGC Mackinac
- USS Mackinac
- USS Mackinaw
