= Rivière-de-la-Savane =

- Unorganized territory
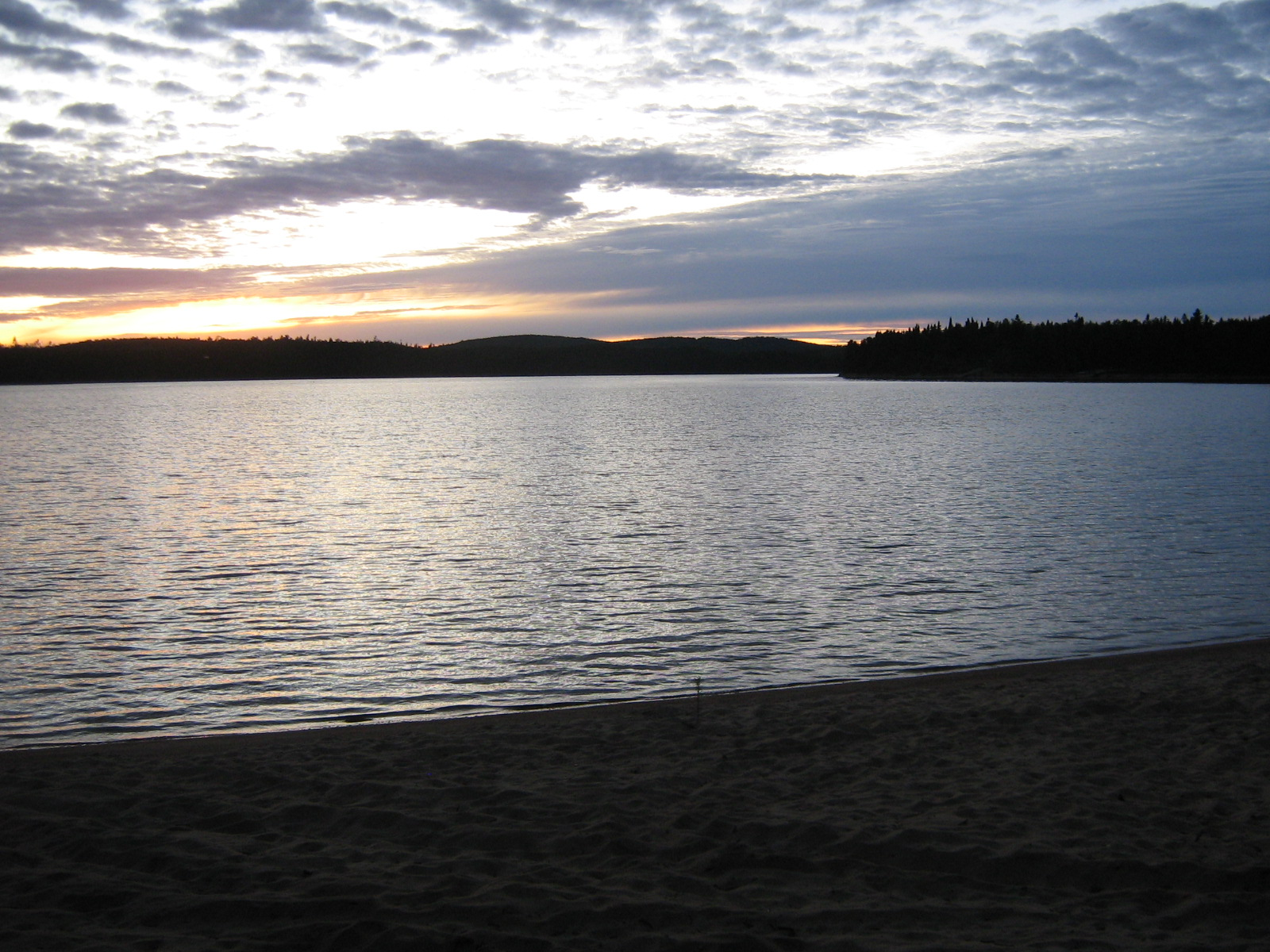
- Lac des Aigles

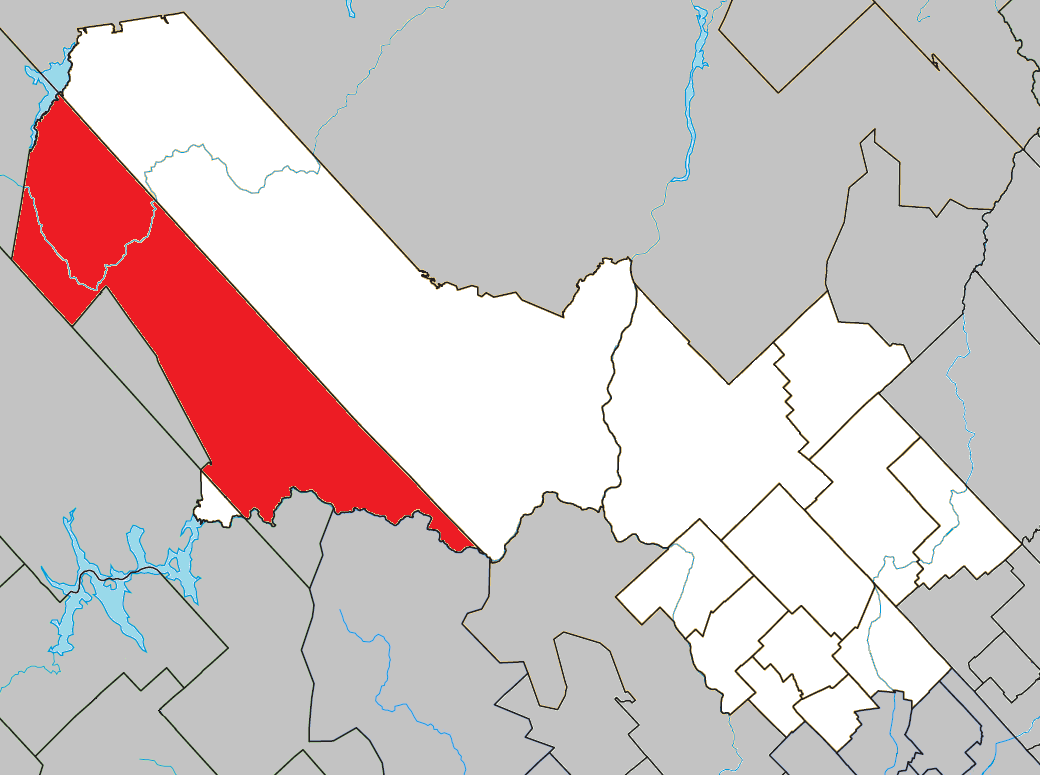
- Location within Mékinac RCM

- Location in central Quebec
- Coordinates: 47°03′N 73°38′W
- Country: Canada
- Province: Quebec
- Region: Mauricie
- RCM: Mékinac
- Constituted: March 13, 1986

Government
  - Fed. riding: Saint-Maurice—Champlain
  - Prov. riding: Laviolette

Area
  - Total: 1,181.23 km^{2} (456.08 sq mi)
  - Land: 1,087.02 km^{2} (419.70 sq mi)

Population (2021)
  - Total: 5
  - Density: 0/km^{2} (0/sq mi)
  - Change 2016-21: ▲ N/A
  - Dwellings: 223
- Time zone: UTC−5 (EST)
  - Summer (DST): UTC−4 (EDT)
- Highways: No major routes

Rivière-de-la-Savane (French pronunciation: [ʁivjɛʁ də la savan]) is an unorganized territory in the Mauricie, province of Quebec, Canada, part of the Mékinac Regional County Municipality. This territory includes among others the Irénée-Marie Ecological Reserve and Zec du Chapeau-de-Paille.

It is named after the Savane River (French: Rivière de la Savane) flowing through the territory. This river, a tributary of Vermillon River, is also known by its Abenaki name Mégoakwtegok, meaning "to the marshy river", which refers to the marshes along its banks.

== Geography ==
Located west of the Saint-Maurice River, the shape of this area resembles to the number "1" bent on 45 degrees to the northwest and its southern boundary is formed by the Matawin River. This area is located north of La Mauricie National Park. The northern boundary of this area is a straight line of 86.5 kilometres (53.7 mi) south-east to north-west, from the Matawin River to Mondonac Lake which defines the northwestern boundary of the territory.

Its entire area is forested.

== Demographics ==
Historical census populations – Rivière-de-la-Savane
Year	Pop.	±%
1996	0	—
2001	0	0.00%
2006	0	0.00%
2011	0	0.00%
2016	0	0.00%
2021	5	—
2021 Population figure based on revised count. Source: Statistics Canada
