= Mékinac Lake =

Lake in Quebec, Canada

Coordinates: 47°03′20″N 72°40′40″W

Mékinac lake
- Mékinac Lake in Quebec
- Location: Trois-Rives, non organized territory of Lac-Masketsi, Quebec
- Type: natural
- Primary inflows: Rivière du milieu (Mékinac), creek sleigh, creek Grosleau, creek Bastien, creek Pronovost
- Primary outflows: Mékinac River
- Catchment area: St. Lawrence River
- Basin countries: Canada Quebec
- Max. length: 18 km (11 mi)
- Max. width: 2.0 km (1 mi)
- Surface area: 22.77 km^{2} (8.79 sq mi)
- Max. depth: 146 m (479 ft)
- Surface elevation: 165 m (541 ft)
- Settlements: Trois-Rives, La Tuque

The Mékinac Lake is a large lake of freshwater of province of Quebec (Canada), located mainly in the municipality Trois-Rives, in Mekinac Regional County Municipality, in the administrative region of Mauricie, in the province of Quebec, in Canada. The northern part of the lake and the bottom of the Bigué Bay (to the west) are within the La Tuque (urban agglomeration).

== Toponymy ==
Like many historic waterways in the St. Lawrence and Great Lakes Basins, Mékinac Lake's name derives from a First Nations language. The Algonquin people who settled by the lake likened the shape of the high promontory overlooking a peninsula jutting into the lake from the east to a turtle, and so named it makinak (Ojibwe mikinaak—snapping turtle). The French used a version of the original pronunciation—Mékinac.

The name "Lake Mékinac" was officially registered as of December 5, 1968, at the "Bank of place names" of Commission de toponymie du Québec (Geographical Names Board of Québec).

The surname "Mekinac" is used in 1808 in the baptismal act of the child Pierre-Olivier Launière said Mekinac, from Sainte-Geneviève-de-Batiscan. The designation "lake Mekinac" appears in 1863 as "Mekina" in a work of Stanislas Drapeau. The designation "Mekinac River" is mentioned in an 1870 report of the surveyor Hilarion Lefebvre. The designation "lake Mekinac" is shown on the official plan of Mékinac (township) in 1899. Finally, the Dictionary of rivers and lakes in the province of Quebec, published in 1914, mentions it. Forestry workers and other travelers coming from the south to reach the Mékinac Lake named on their way the North Mékinac River (Petite rivière Mékinac nord), located in the territory of Saint-Tite and Grandes-Piles.

== Geography ==
Mékinac lake has the shape of a cross, because of two bays forming the arms of the cross in the middle of the lake:

- "Arm Bigué" (West side) that receives water from the outlet of "lac aux sleighs" (lake of Sleighs). The outlet of Lake Tom flows North into the "lac aux sleighs";
- "Grosleau Arms" (East side) that receives water discharge (long 0.4 km) of Lake Gélinas, which is located in the mountains.

In the northern part of the lake (on the west bank), a camping site was built at the foot of the mountain "Cap à l'aigle" (Cape eagle), where the views are stunning.

Mekinac lake covers 23 km^{2} in the townships of Carignan (North part), Hackett (central part) and Mekinac (south part). Its length is 18 km by 2 km wide. The lake drains into the Mekinac River, which is a tributary of the Saint-Maurice River. A water retention dam located at the mouth of Lake Mekinac was rebuilt in 2011 and 2012. The two main tributaries of Lake Mekinac are :

- Rivière du milieu (River of the Middle) which flows from the eastern shore, in the northern part of the lake;
- discharge of Missionary Lake which flows near the Mékinac dam, located south of Lake Mekinac.

By road, the mouth of the lake is located about 99 km north of Trois-Rivières downtown or 52 km from Grand-Mère downtown. Starting from Grand-Mère, the path is to take the Route 155 (north) along the east bank of the Saint-Maurice River. Just before the bridge over the Mekinac River, 4.7 km after the village of Saint-Roch-de-Mékinac, turn on Saint-Joseph path towards Saint-Joseph-de-Mékinac, Quebec (municipality of Trois-Rives), a legendary authentic village that was developed through forestry, agriculture and tourist activities. After this town, turn left onto "Chemin du lac Mékinac" (Lake Mekinac Road). The distance between the Mekinac bridge (Saint-Roch-de-Mékinac) and the dam of Mekinac Lake (Trois-Rives) is 18.4 km (measured by road).

== History ==
A peninsula in the middle of Lake Mekinac, on East bank (in the municipality of Trois-Rives) is designated the "Trou-du-Steamboat". It is located off the bay designated "Bras Grosleau" (Grosleau Arm) whose top of the neighbor mountain (north side) reaches over 320 meters. In this area, the mountains on the east side of the lake form a long promontory which falls into the lake Mekinac. Consequently, navigators have few places to hide when the wind rises.

The name of this place is associated with a boat powered by a steam engine (commonly called "steamboat") who found refuge regularly in the large bay of "Bras Grosleau" when the lake became too agitated. To enter the bay, the boat had to cross a strait of 270 meters wide, between the peninsula and the headland, to take refuge in one of the four bays of "Bras Grosleau". This ship sank in 1930's near the same peninsula, in front of the "Grosleau Arm". The bay called "Bigué Arm" also was another haven for boats.

The steam boat was used to circumvent the peninsula, on which the central mountain rises to over 260 meters, including commuting between bay "Grosleau Arm" (East side), with the bay "Bigué Arm" located at the opposite on the west shore of the lake. The steam boat was carrying forestry workers and goods to supply the logging camps established around the lake.

The name "Trou-du-Steamboat" was officially registered on January 25, 1990, at the Bank of place names of the Commission de toponymie du Québec (Geographical Names Board of Québec)

== See also ==
- Mékinac River
- Du Missionnaire Lake
- Sainte-Thècle, Quebec
- Saint-Roch-de-Mékinac, Quebec
- Mékinac Regional County Municipality
- Mékinac dam (Québec)
- Rivière du milieu (Mékinac)
- Trois-Rives, municipality
- Mékinac (township)
- Zec de la Bessonne
- Lac-Masketsi, Quebec, unorganized territory
