= Lucien Mongrain =

Canadian politician (1932–2022)

Lucien Mongrain (June 24, 1932 – December 9, 2022) was a Canadian politician and the Mayor of Trois-Rives, Mauricie in Canada.

== Background ==
He was born in Shawinigan, Mauricie on June 24, 1932. He worked as a mechanic and in forestry.

== Political career ==
He ran for election as Mayor of Trois-Rives, then known as Boucher, in 1978, but lost against Elphège Desrosiers.

Mongrain ran again in 1981 and defeated the incumbent.

He was re-elected in 1985 and won every subsequent election, running unopposed in 1989, 1993, 1997, 2001, 2005, 2009 and 2013.

In 2017, he won re-election with 247 votes (62.22%) against Joël Francoeur (77 votes) and Claude Doucet (73 votes).

In 2021, he retired after forty years as mayor.

During Mongrain's tenure (in 2007), a fire department that services Trois-Rives, as well as Grandes-Piles and Saint-Roch-de-Mékinac was established. Lucien Mongrain ran a debt-free administration that oversaw an increase in property value from $3.6 million in 1978 to $119 million in 2012 and in budget from $57,236 to $1,487,971, as well as infrastructure investments.

== Footnotes ==
Political offices
Preceded by Elphège Desrosiers	Mayor of Trois-Rives; 1981–2022	Succeeded by Vacant
