= Mékinac (township) =

Mekinac Township
- Township
- Location within Canada Location within Quebec
- Coordinates: 46.91666°N 72.75°W
- Country: Canada
- Province: Quebec
- Region: Mauricie
- District: Mékinac
- City: Trois-Rives
- Proclamation: November 7, 1874

The Mékinac Township is an area located in the municipality of Trois-Rives in the Mékinac Regional County Municipality (RCM), in the administrative region of Mauricie in the province of Quebec, in Canada. Mékinac Township is mostly a forest and agricultural land. Forestry has been the engine of the economy of the region. Today, this area is famous for tourist activities, the resort, hunting, fishing, water sports, ATVs, snowmobiles, excursions on foot in the forest and climbing some cliffs.

== Geography ==
Located in the Mid-Mauricie, the Mékinac Towhship includes Mékinac Lake which discharges into the Mékinac River, which empties into the Saint-Maurice River. Mékinac Township is backed at South by the Lejeune Township, located in the northern part of the municipality of Sainte-Thècle. Mékinac Township is drained by several rivers including the Boucher River and streams Michelin, Dumont, Thom and Fou. The hamlet of Saint-Joseph-de-Mékinac (formerly a parish municipality) is located in the south of the township, in the municipality of Trois-Rives.

== History ==
Township Mekinac was established by a proclamation of November 7, 1874 of Government of Quebec.

== Toponymy ==
The word "Mekinac" has been associated with many homonyms as the river, the lake, the township, the MRC, the Catholic parishes of St. Roch and St. Joseph Mekinac Mékinac ... The name "Mékinac Township" was formalized as of December 5, 1968 in the register of place names in the Commission de toponymie du Québec (Geographical Names Board of Québec).

== See also ==
- Saint-Maurice River
- Mékinac Regional County Municipality (RCM)
- List of township municipalities in Quebec
- Marmier (township)
- Lejeune Township
- Mékinac Dam
- Trois-Rives
- Mékinac Lake
