= Jeffrey Mongrain =

American artist

Jeffrey Mongrain is an American artist, currently a Distinguished Professor at Hunter College, City University of New York. He joined the faculty of hunter College in 1995.
