= Trois-Rives =

- Municipality
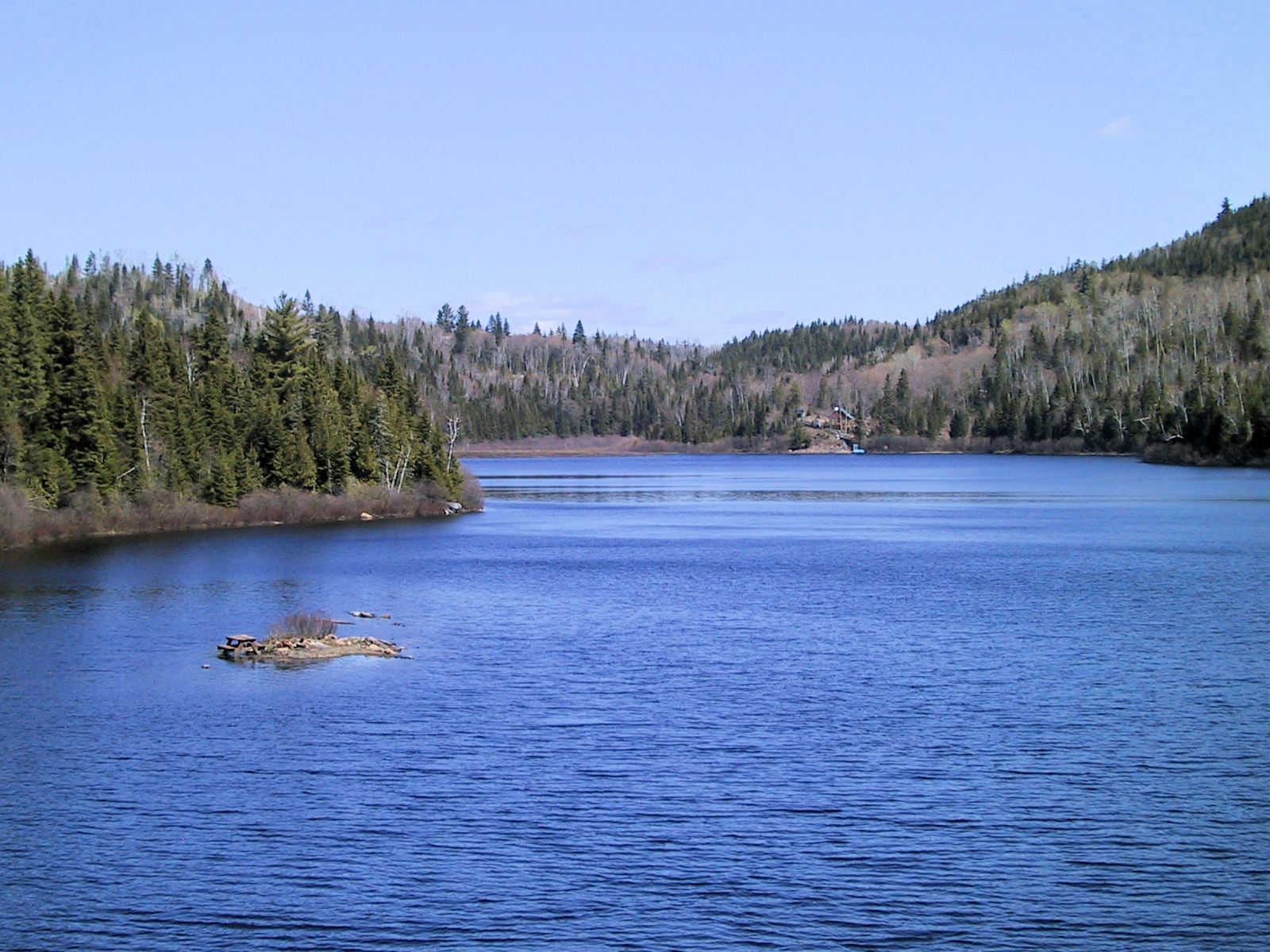
- Lac Noir

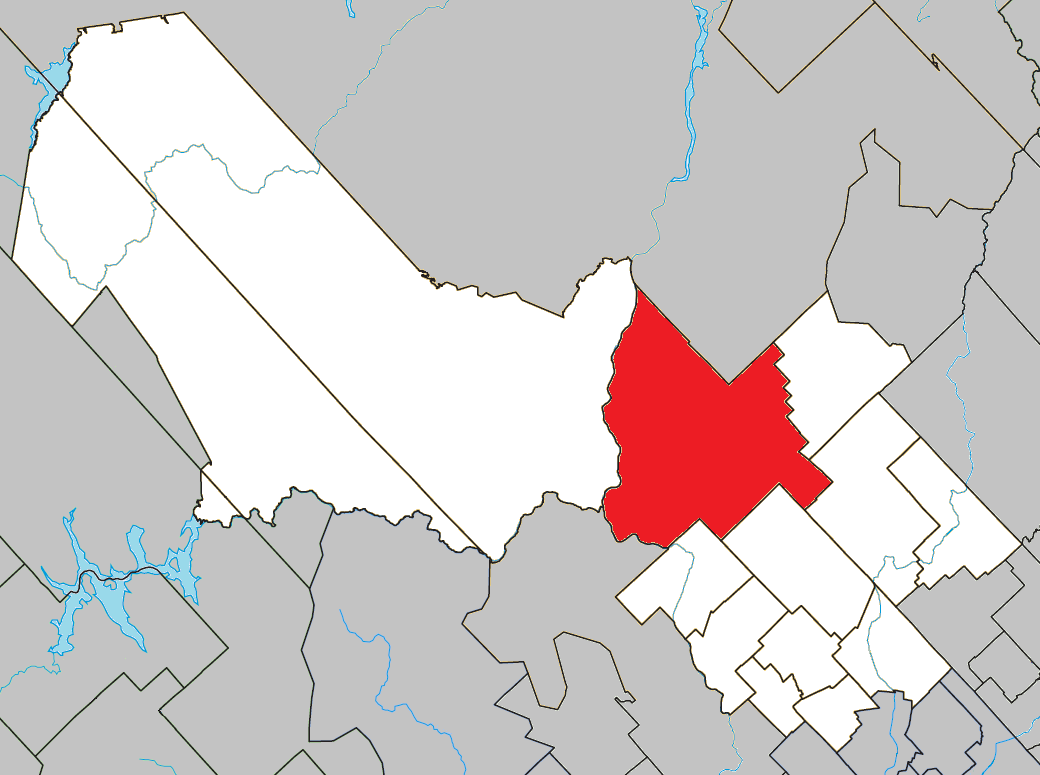
- Location within Mékinac RCM

- Location in central Quebec
- Coordinates: 47°00′N 72°45′W
- Country: Canada
- Province: Quebec
- Region: Mauricie
- RCM: Mékinac
- Constituted: September 2, 1972
- Named for: The three rivers that drain its territory

Government
  - Mayor: Claude Trudel
  - Federal riding: Saint-Maurice—Champlain
  - Prov. riding: Laviolette–Saint-Maurice

Area
  - Total: 653.53 km^{2} (252.33 sq mi)
  - Land: 597.76 km^{2} (230.80 sq mi)

Population (2021)
  - Total: 432
  - Density: 0.7/km^{2} (1.8/sq mi)
  - Change 2016-21: ▲9.1%
  - Dwellings: 544
- Time zone: UTC−5 (EST)
  - Summer (DST): UTC−4 (EDT)
- Postal code(s): G0X 2C0
- Area code(s): 819
- Highways: R-155
- Website: trois-rives.com

Trois-Rives (French pronunciation: [tʁwa ʁiv]) is a municipality with an area of 675 square kilometres (261 sq mi) located in Mékinac Regional County Municipality, in the Mauricie, province of Quebec, Canada.

== History ==
It was established in 1972 as Boucher, named after the geographic township of Boucher in which it is located. This name was chosen in honour of Pierre Boucher, former French governor of Trois-Rivières and owner of the Boucher and Boucherville Seignories in the late 17th century. It was not until 1978 that the municipal incorporation was confirmed.

On December 26, 1998, the municipality was renamed to Trois-Rives (French for "Three shores") to better represent the geography of the municipality as it is crossed by three rivers: the Matawin, the Mékinac, and the Saint-Maurice River.

On August 28, 2004, Trois-Rives was enlarged by some 70 square kilometres (27 sq mi) when it annexed a portion of the Lac-Masketsi Unorganized Territory.

== Geography ==
It is bounded on the west by the Saint-Maurice River, and includes the communities of Grande-Anse, Olscamps, Rivière-Matawin, Saint-Joseph-de-Mékinac, and partially Rivière-aux-Rats.

The territory also includes in the east portions of Mékinac Lake (in part), Missionary Lake (in part), aux Loutres, and Dumont Lakes.

The toponym "Trois-Rives" (three banks) refers to the three rivers that drain the territory: the Matawin River, the Saint-Maurice River and the Mékinac River.

== Demographics ==
Historical census populations – Trois-Rives

Year	Pop.	±%
1976	612	—
1981	604	−1.3%
1986	496	−17.9%
1991	516	+4.0%
1996	454	−12.0%

Year	Pop.	±%
2001	469	+3.3%
2006	411	−12.4%
2011	490	+19.2%
2016	396	−19.2%
2021	432	+9.1%

2021 Population figures based on revised count.
Source: Statistics Canada

Private dwellings occupied by usual residents (2021): 254 (total dwellings: 544)

Mother tongue (2021):

- English as first language: 1%
- French as first language: 99%
- English and French as first language: 0%
- Other as first language: 0%

== Government ==
=== Mayors ===
Trois-Rives has been represented by a mayor since 1978. The following is a list of mayors of Trois-Rives:

1. Elphège Desrosiers (1978–1981)
2. Lucien Mongrain (1981–2021)
3. Lise Roy Guillemette (2021–2025)
4. Claude Trudel (2025–present)

=== Political representation ===
Federally, Trois-Rives is part of the federal riding of Saint-Maurice—Champlain. In the 2021 Canadian federal election, the incumbent François-Philippe Champagne of the Liberal Party was re-elected to represent the population Trois-Rives in the House of Commons of Canada.

Trois-Rives federal election results
Year	Liberal		Conservative		Bloc Québécois		New Democratic		Green	
2021	38%	108	19%	53	38%	108	1%	4	0%	0
2019	34%	99	21%	61	40%	114	2%	5	2%	5
2015	43%	97	15%	33	25%	55	16%	36	1%	2
2011	12%	29	25%	59	22%	53	40%	94	1%	2
2008	15%	34	28%	63	44%	100	9%	20	4%	8
2006	16%	36	33%	76	40%	92	10%	22	2%	4
2004	27%	62	8%	18	61%	139	0%	1	2%	5

Provincially it is part of the riding of Laviolette–Saint-Maurice. In the 2022 Quebec general election the incumbent MNA Marie-Louise Tardif, of the Coalition Avenir Québec, was re-elected to represent the population of Trois-Rives in the National Assembly of Quebec.

Trois-Rives provincial election results
Year	CAQ		Liberal		QC solidaire		Parti Québécois	
2022	60%	122	3%	7	5%	10	16%	32
2018	49%	120	18%	43	12%	28	13%	31
2014	16%	59	56%	209	3%	11	24%	88
2012	14%	40	52%	144	2%	6	30%	84

== Transportation ==
The municipality has two main roads: Quebec Route 155 (along the Saint-Maurice River on the eastern shore); and St. Joseph road through the village of Saint-Joseph-de-Mékinac along the Mékinac River, reaching the Quebec Route 155 near the mouth of that river. The path of almost all other roads goes along the rivers. Generally, each route is designated as the place name of the headwater lake that feeds it:

1. Road Lake-to-sleighs (along the discharge of lakes Grobois, Lemere and the sleighs);
2. Path of the domain Batchelder;
3. Path of Mékinac Lake (along the Mékinac Lake, on the west side);
4. Path of the river and road Crows (linking Vincent Lake);
5. Lake Road Dumont (Dumont bypassing the lake, by the west bank);
6. Path of Missionary Lake, which is segmented into two, the first segment links Saint-Joseph-de-Mékinac to the northern part of the lake and the second segment link the southern part of the lake, to Hervey-Jonction, Quebec;
7. Road of the lake of the Otters;
8. Lejeune Road;
9. Vlimeux Lake Road.

== See also ==
- Mékinac dam (Québec)
- Rivière du Milieu (Mékinac)
- Lejeune Township
- Mékinac (township)
