= USRC Mackinac =

Patrol boat of the U.S. Revenue Cutter Service

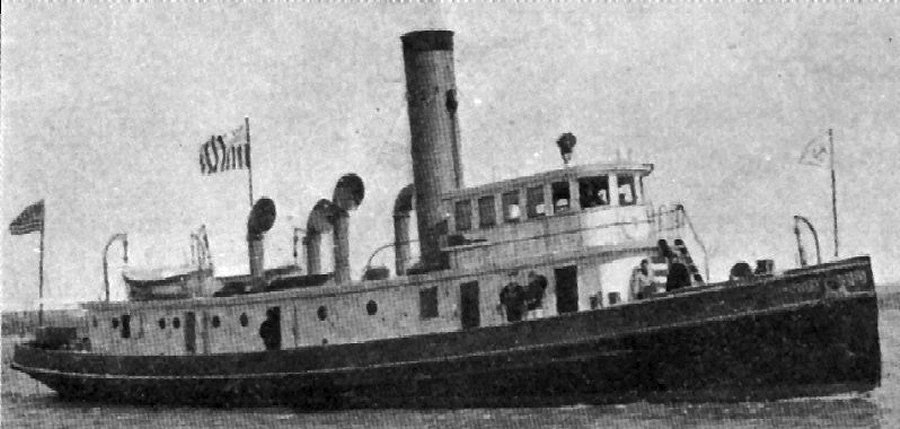

History

United States
- Name: USRC (later USCGC) Mackinac
- Namesake: Mackinac Island and Straits of Mackinac in Michigan
- Builder: Spedden Company, Baltimore, Maryland
- Cost: $75,000 (USD)
- Launched: 11 October 1902
- Commissioned: 29 October 1903
- Decommissioned: 8 June 1939
- Notes: Served as United States Navy patrol boat USS Mackinac 1917-1919

General characteristics
- Displacement: 240 tons
- Length: 110 ft (34 m)
- Beam: 20 ft 6 in (6.25 m)
- Draft: 10 ft 6 in (3.20 m)
- Propulsion: Triple expansion steam engine
- Speed: 10.0 knots (maximum)
- Complement: 11

USRC Mackinac, later USCGC Mackinac, was a patrol boat that served in the United States Revenue Cutter Service from 1903 to 1915 and in the United States Coast Guard from 1915 to 1917 and from 1919 to 1939.

== Construction and commissioning ==
USRC Mackinac was launched on 11 October 1902 by the Spedden Company at Baltimore, Maryland. She was commissioned into the U.S. Revenue Cutter Service on 29 October 1903, the first ship of the Revenue Cutter Service to bear the name.

== Operations on the Great Lakes and Massachusetts coast 1903-1917 ==
Upon commissioning, Mackinac was assigned to duty on the Great Lakes as a boarding boat at Erie, Pennsylvania.

She left the Great Lakes briefly in the spring of 1905 for service along the Massachusetts coast, but on 25 April 1905 she was ordered to return to the Great Lakes, specifically to proceed to Sault Ste. Marie, Michigan, for "customs duty, and enforce the rules and regulations governing the movement and anchorages of vessels in the St. Mary's River." She arrived at Sault Ste. Marie on 28 June 1905. When the Great Lakes iced over for the winter, she was placed out of service at Milwaukee, Wisconsin, on 1 December 1905 to await the opening of navigation in the spring of 1906.

Until 1917, Mackinac operated in the Great Lakes each year during the navigation season and was laid up each winter when ice closed the lakes to navigation.

When the United States Coast Guard was created in 1915 by the merger of the Revenue Cutter Service with the United States Lifesaving Service, Mackinac, redesignated USCGC Mackinac, became part of the new Coast Guard.

== United States Navy service 1917-1919 ==
When the United States entered World War I in 1917, Mackinac's Great Lakes routine ended when she was taken over by the United States Navy for use as a patrol boat. As USS Mackinac, she served in the Atlantic in the 3rd Naval District during the war, patrolling the United States East Coast. She was stricken from the Naval Vessel Register and returned to the Coast Guard on 22 September 1919, once again becoming USCGC Mackinac.

== Coast Guard career 1919-1939 ==
Upon her return to the Coast Guard, Mackinac was stationed at Boston, Massachusetts, from which she patrolled the New England coast for the remainder of her Coast Guard career, .

== Decommissioning ==
Mackinac was decommissioned on 8 June 1939
