= Quebec Route 155 =

Highway in Quebec

Route 155

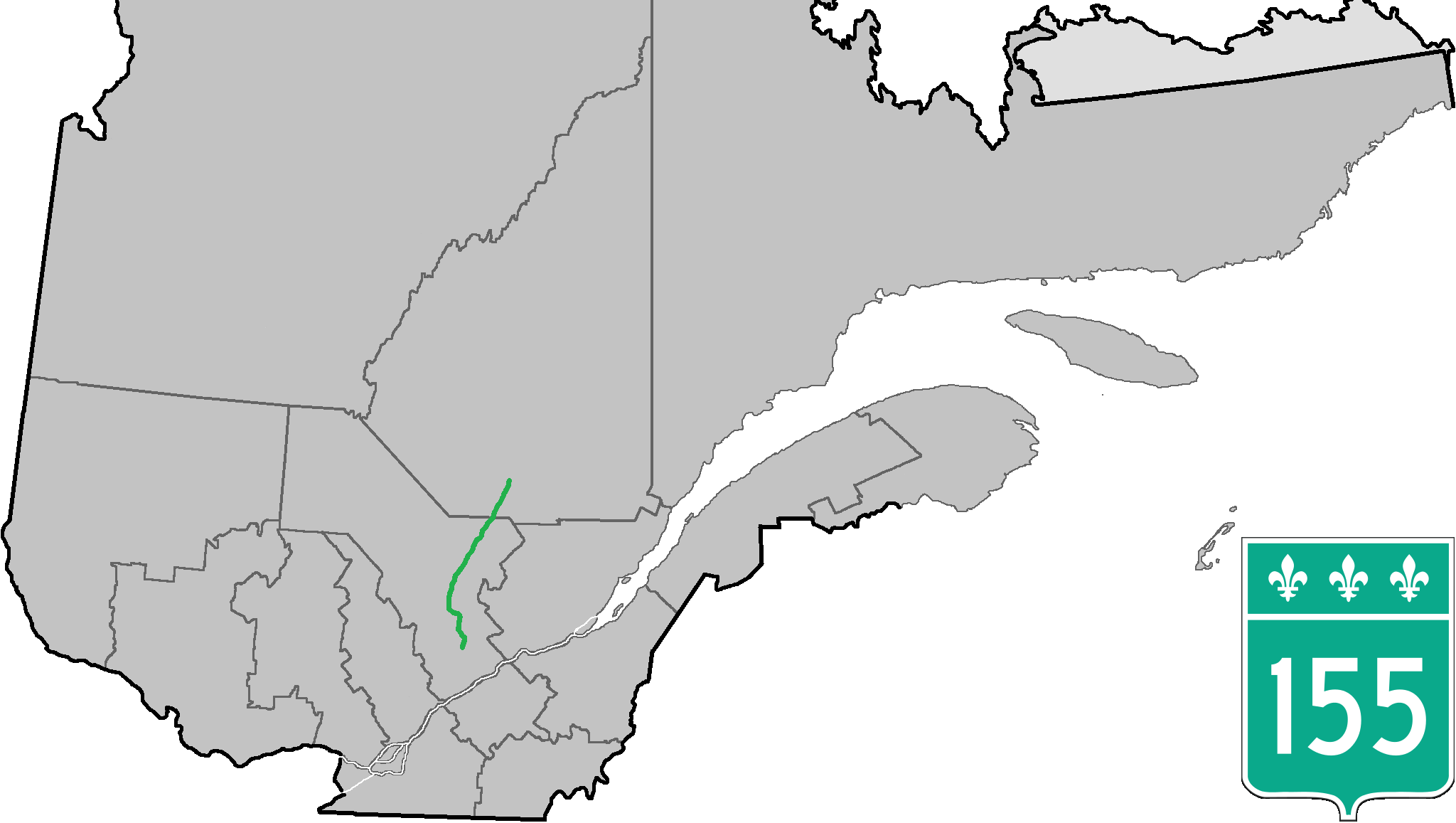

Route information
- Maintained by Transports Québec
- Length: 248.3 km (154.3 mi) Pre-2006: 333.6 km (207.3 mi)
- History: Route 13 (Bon-Conseil – Sainte-Angèle-de-Laval); Route 19 (Saint-Georges-de-Champlain – Chambord)

Major junctions
- South end: A-55 in Shawinigan
- R-159 in Saint-Roch-de-Mékinac
- North end: R-169 in Chambord

Location
- Country: Canada
- Province: Quebec
- Major cities: Shawinigan, La Tuque

Highway system
- Quebec provincial highways; Autoroutes; List; Former
← R-153	→ R-157

Route 155 is a north/south highway on the north shore of the Saint Lawrence River in Quebec, Canada. Its northern terminus is in Chambord at the junction of Route 169, and the southern terminus is the Piles Bridge in Shawinigan. Previously the highway continued to Autoroute 20 but that section was decommissioned in 2006 when Autoroute 55 was completed.

Most of the length of the highway runs in the Mauricie region very close to the Saint-Maurice River on the opposite side of which is the La Mauricie National Park (Parks Canada). Several small bridges and roads connect the park to Route 155. It is also the main ground transportation route between the Mauricie and Centre-du-Québec regions and the Saguenay–Lac-Saint-Jean.

== Municipalities along Route 155 ==
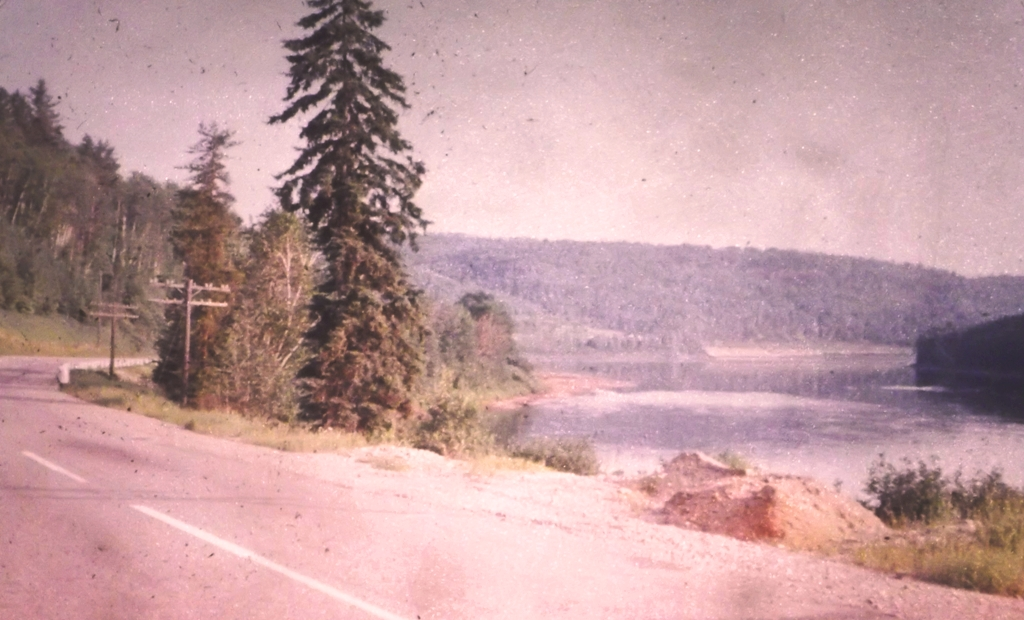
Quebec Route 155 near La Tuque in 1963

- Shawinigan
- Grandes-Piles
- Saint-Roch-de-Mékinac
- Trois-Rives
- La Tuque
- La Bostonnais
- Lac-Bouchette
- Saint-François-de-Sales
- Chambord

== Major intersections ==
RCM	Location	km	mi	Destinations	Notes
Drummond–Nicolet-Yamaska boundary	Notre-Dame-du-Bon-Conseil–Saint-Léonard-d'Aston boundary	−85.3	−53.0	A-20 (TCH) south / A-55 – Québec, Drummondville, Montréal	A-20 exit 200; former R-155 southern terminus
Nicolet-Yamaska	Saint-Célestin (village)	−64.2	−39.9	R-226 west – Sainte-Monique	Former south end of R-266 concurrency
Nicolet-Yamaska	Saint-Célestin (municipality)	−63.3	−39.3	A-55 north / R-161 south / R-226 east – Trois-Rivières, Saint-Wenceslas, Victoriaville, Sainte-Gertrude	Former A-55 southern terminus (Trois-Rivières section); former north end of R-266 concurrency; former south end of A-55 concurrency; former R-161 northern terminus
See Quebec Autoroute 55 § Exit list
Shawinigan		0.0	0.0	A-55 south – Trois-Rivières	R-155 southern terminus; continues as A-55
Shawinigan		0.0	0.0	Pont des Piles (Piles Bridge) crosses Saint-Maurice River	
Shawinigan		1.1	0.68	To R-153 / Chemin des Navigateurs – Saint-Tite	Roundabout
Mékinac	Saint-Roch-de-Mékinac	24.0	14.9	R-159 south – Saint-Tite	
Mékinac	Saint-Roch-de-Mékinac	29.6	18.4	Chemin de Saint-Joseph – Trois-Rives	
La Tuque		106.0	65.9	Boulevard Ducharme – La Tuque (Centre-Ville)	
La Tuque		110.7	68.8	Rue Wayagamace – La Tuque (Centre-Ville)	
La Tuque		117.2	72.8	Rue de la Rivière – La Tuque (Centre-Ville), La Croche, Wemotaci	
Le Domaine-du-Roy	Chambord	248.3	154.3	R-169 – Roberval, Métabetchouan–Lac-à-la-Croix, Alma	R-155 northern terminus
1.000 mi = 1.609 km; 1.000 km = 0.621 mi: Closed/former; Route transition

== See also ==
- List of Quebec provincial highways
