= Mékinac River =

Coordinates: 46.8542°N 72.7656°W

- Mékinac River in Quebec

Location
- Country: Canada, in province of Quebec

Physical characteristics
- Source
  - location: Mékinac Lake
- Mouth
  - location: Saint-Maurice River in Trois-Rives
- Length: 26 km (16 mi)
- Basin size: 1,124 km^{2} (434 mi^{2})

The Mékinac river is a located in the RCM Mekinac Regional County Municipality, in the administrative region of Mauricie, the province of Quebec, in Canada. This river of Middle Mauricie has played an important role in the forestry industry at the end of the 19th century.

== Geography ==
This short river of 26 km rises in the Mékinac Lake and flows south to throw in the Saint-Maurice River in north of Saint-Roch-de-Mékinac. The mouth is located almost opposite the Mekinac island near the west bank of the Saint-Maurice River. The Mekinac river flows especially in agricultural areas and sometimes in forest. The river pass through the village of Saint-Joseph-de-Mékinac. This river has many rapids, making it navigable for shallow-draft, especially in the Spring and only in certain segments outside periods of major floods. The river is usually frozen from December to late March, except in some areas of strong rapids. A dam of 6,8 m. managed by Hydro-Québec is held at the mouth of Mékinac Lake. While the discharge of Missionary Lake flows into the Mékinac Lake, near the dam.

In its descent, the Mekinac river receives on its right bank the water of the stream Dumont, and on its left bank streams Thom (taking its source at Lake Thom, George, to Bouchard and Le Jeune) and Vlimeux (taking its source at Lake Vlimeux). Mekinac river flows along the northern boundary of Lejeune township, in the northern part of the municipality of Sainte-Thècle.

The road linking the village of Saint-Joseph-de-Mékinac and the mouth of the river Mekinac, is located on the south side of the River.

The Missionary Lake and Mékinac Lake are known for their touristic activities, including vacation, camping, boating, cottages ...

== Toponymy ==
The origin of the name comes from the word "Mekinac" ("Mikinak" in Algonquin) which means "turtle".

== See also ==
- Trois-Rives
- Mékinac Regional County Municipality
- Mékinac Lake
- Saint-Roch-de-Mékinac, Quebec
- Du Missionnaire Lake
- Sainte-Thècle, Quebec
- Mékinac dam (Québec)
