= Mékinac Regional County Municipality =

Mékinac (RCM)
- Regional county municipality
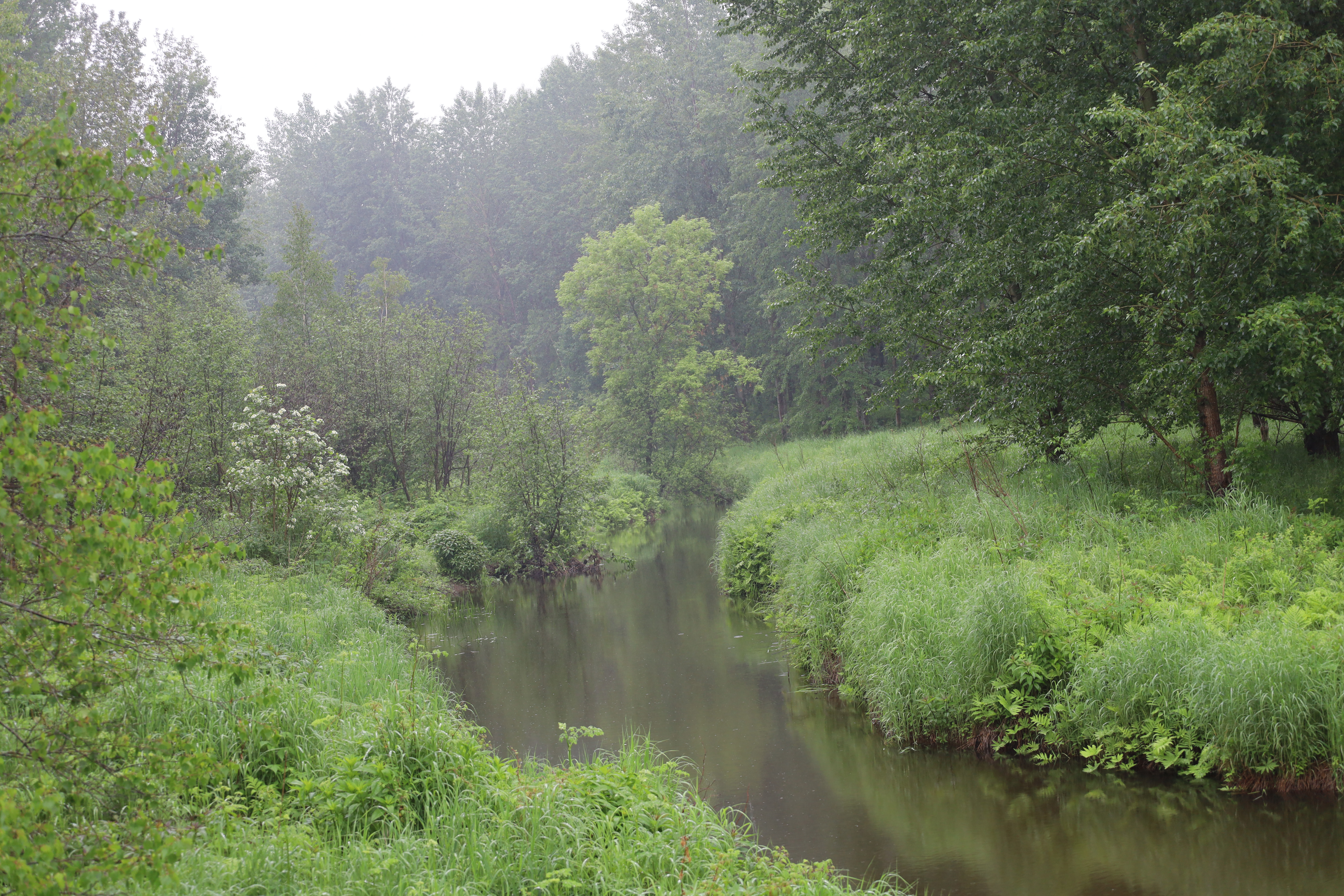
- Rivière à la Tortue, Hérouxville

- Coordinates: 46°49′N 72°31′W
- Country: Canada
- Province: Quebec
- Region: Mauricie
- Effective: January 1, 1982
- County seat: Saint-Tite
- Municipalities: List: Saint-Tite; Notre-Dame-de-Montauban; Sainte-Thècle; Trois-Rives; Hérouxville; Lac-aux-Sables; Saint-Adelphe; Saint-Roch-de-Mékinac; Saint-Séverin; Grandes-Piles; Lac-Boulé; Lac-Masketsi; Lac-Normand; Rivière-de-la-Savane

Government
  - Type: Prefecture
  - Prefect: Alain Vallée

Area
  - Total: 5,554.90 km^{2} (2,144.76 sq mi)
  - Land: 5,222.10 km^{2} (2,016.26 sq mi)

Population (2016)
  - Total: 12,358
  - Density: 2.4/km^{2} (6.2/sq mi)
  - Change 2011-2016: ▼4.4%
  - Dwellings: 8,324
- Time zone: UTC−5 (EST)
  - Summer (DST): UTC−4 (EDT)
- Area codes: 418 and 581
- Website: Official web site

Mékinac (French: [mekinak]) is a regional county municipality (RCM) of 5,607 km^{2} (2,165 sq mi) located in the administrative region of Mauricie, along the Saint-Maurice River, which also crosses the RCM from one end to the other, and the Matawin River, a tributary of the Saint-Maurice. Located in the province of Quebec, Canada.

Established in January 1982, the Mékinac RCM is made up of 10 or 11 municipalities depending on the source, Saint-Tite is the most populous city, four unorganized territories occupying two-thirds of its surface area.

== Geography ==
Eleven municipalities and Unorganized Territories make up the RCM de Mékinac. It is distinguished by a huge forest dotted with more than 2,000 lakes, agriculture adapted to the environment, popular holiday sites and picturesque villages. The Mékinac RCM is located on both sides of the Saint-Maurice River, between the upper and central Mauricie regions. It is adjacent to the RCMs of Matawinie, Maskinongé, Centre-du-Québec, Les Chenaux, Portneuf and Haut-Saint-Maurice. As part of the Mauricie administrative region, it is divided into two provincial electoral districts; Portneuf and Laviolette, while the federal riding is Champlain.

Concentrated in the southeastern tip of the territory, agricultural land corresponds to the limit of the invasion of the Champlain Sea. There is also some land cleared for cultivation in certain settlement hamlets scattered between the Laurentian Mountains, on the banks of the Mékinac River, and the northern portion of the Batiscan River.

The forest covers nearly 93% of the total area of the Mékinac RCM. It was the raison d'être of the colonization of the territory and still supports 20% of all jobs.

Forest ownership is shared between: the provincial government (public lands), the federal government (La Mauricie National Park) and approximately 587 private landowners, with a proportion of 79%, 1% and 20% of the forest respectively.

=== Hydrology: 3 major rivers - 4,665 lakes ===
The Saint-Maurice River, the Batiscan River and the Sainte-Anne River flow from west to east on the territory of the MRC de Mékinac, the hydrographic network includes:

- 2,964 km of permanent watercourses
- 2,863 km of intermittent rivers for a total of 5827 km.
- Nearly 38% (2,241 km) of this system is privately owned, with 791 km (35%) of permanent watercourses and 1,450 km of intermittent (65%) watercourses.

The Mékinac RCM has 4,665 lakes for a total area of 34,272.8 ha (342.7 km2).

- The number of lakes of one hectare or more is 1,869.
- Lakes of less than one hectare account for nearly 60% (2,797 ha) of all bodies of water in the MRC.
- The largest is Lake Mékinac measuring 2,297 ha (23.0 km2). It is divided between the Mékinac RCM and the La Tuque agglomeration, where most (79.9%) is in the Mékinac RCM.
- Most of the lakes (53.4%) in the MRC are classified as very small (1 to 5 ha) according to Bazoge and Blais (2005) with a surface area of less than 5 ha.
- Conversely, there are only three very large lakes (625 ha or more) in the RCM, lakes Mékinac, Normand and Salone. Source: MRC de Mékinac Regional Plan for Wetlands and Bodies of Water

== Photos ==
The Mauricie region river's Saint-Maurice, Batiscan, Sainte-Anne (Les Chenaux) and their tributaries cross the territory of Mékinac RCM

Three majors rivers

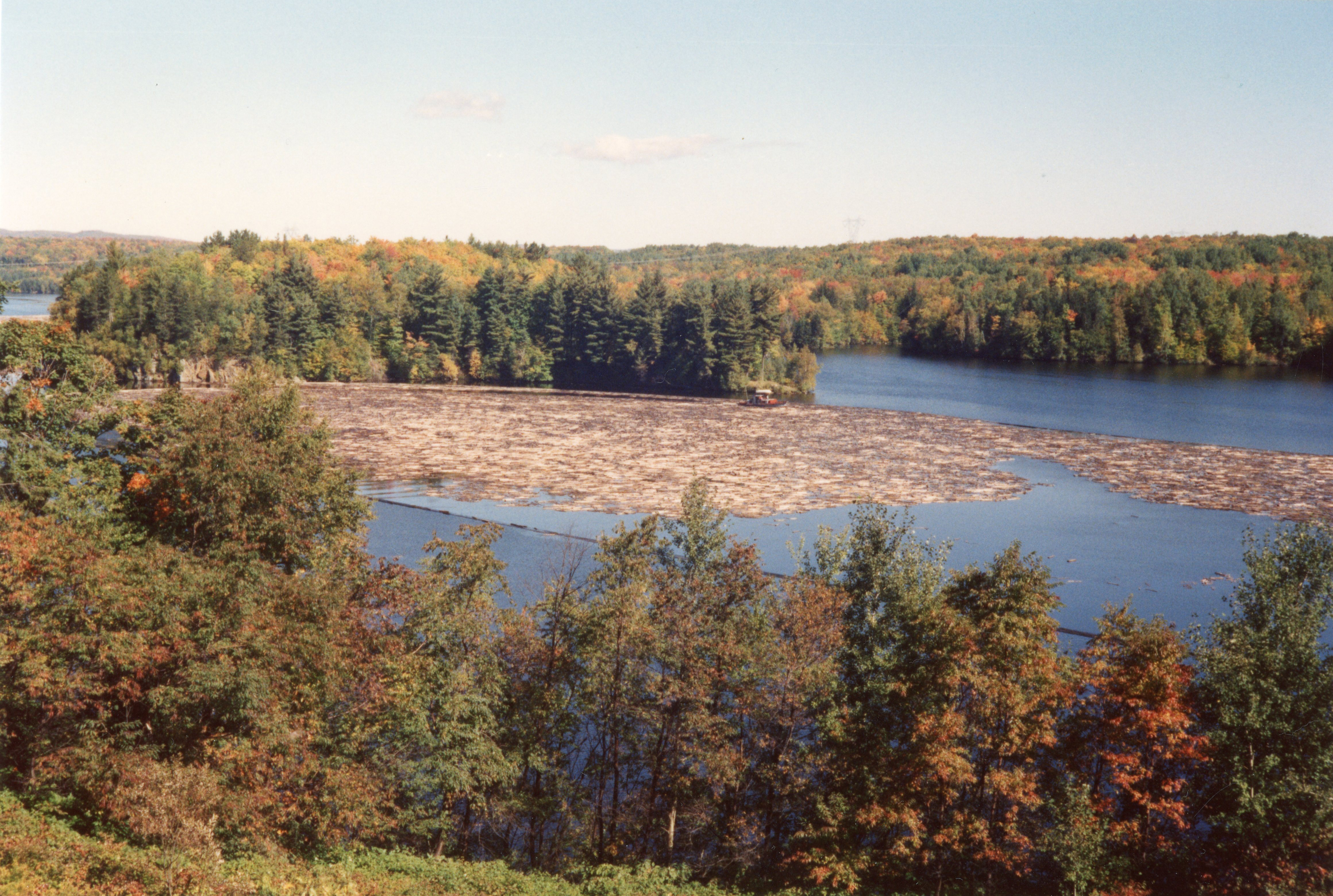
Saint-Maurice, lumber floating, (formerly Saint-Jean-des-Piles) Shawinigan 1994

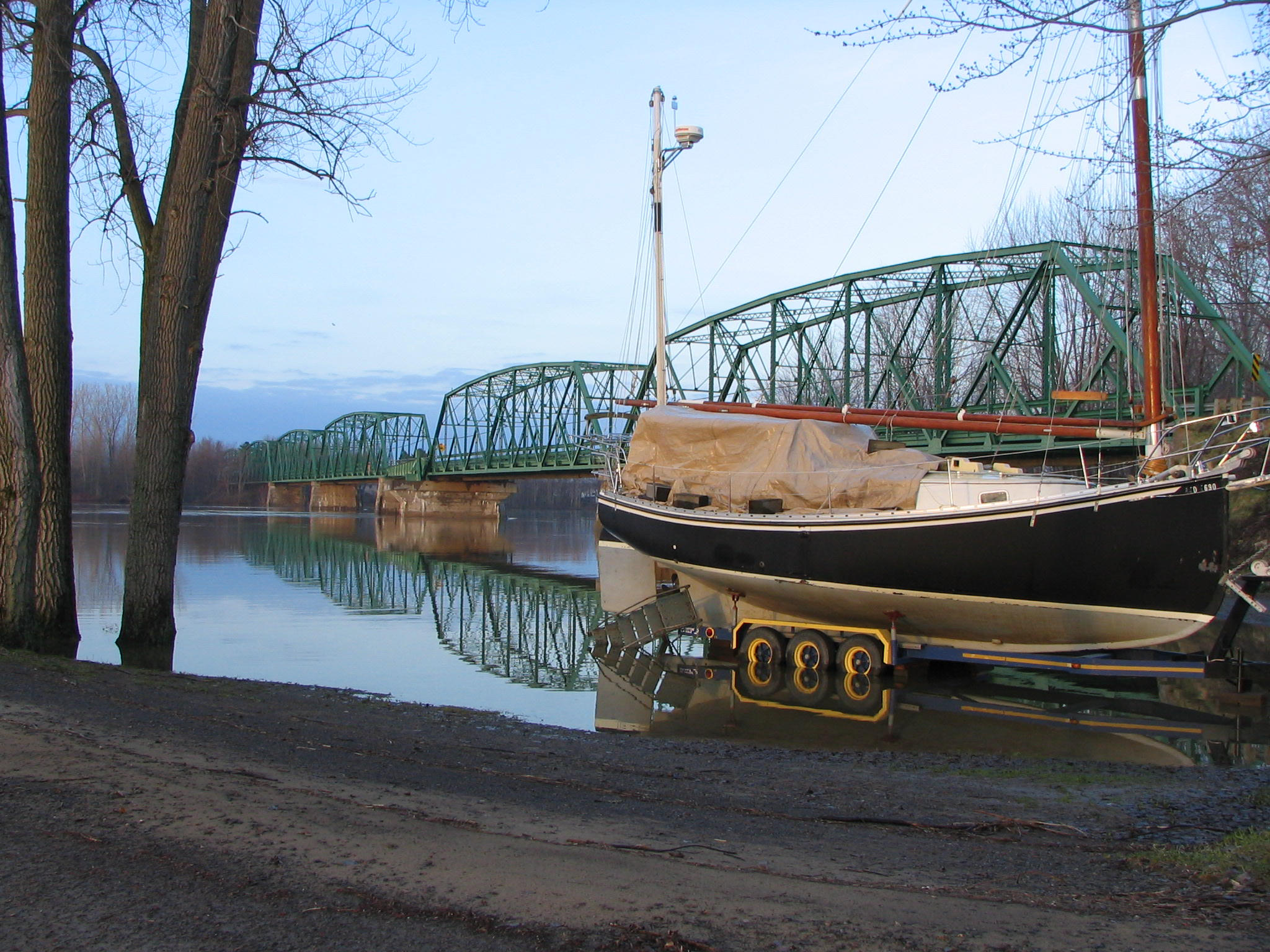
Batiscan, near its mouth, iron bridge, Chemin du Roy, Batiscan

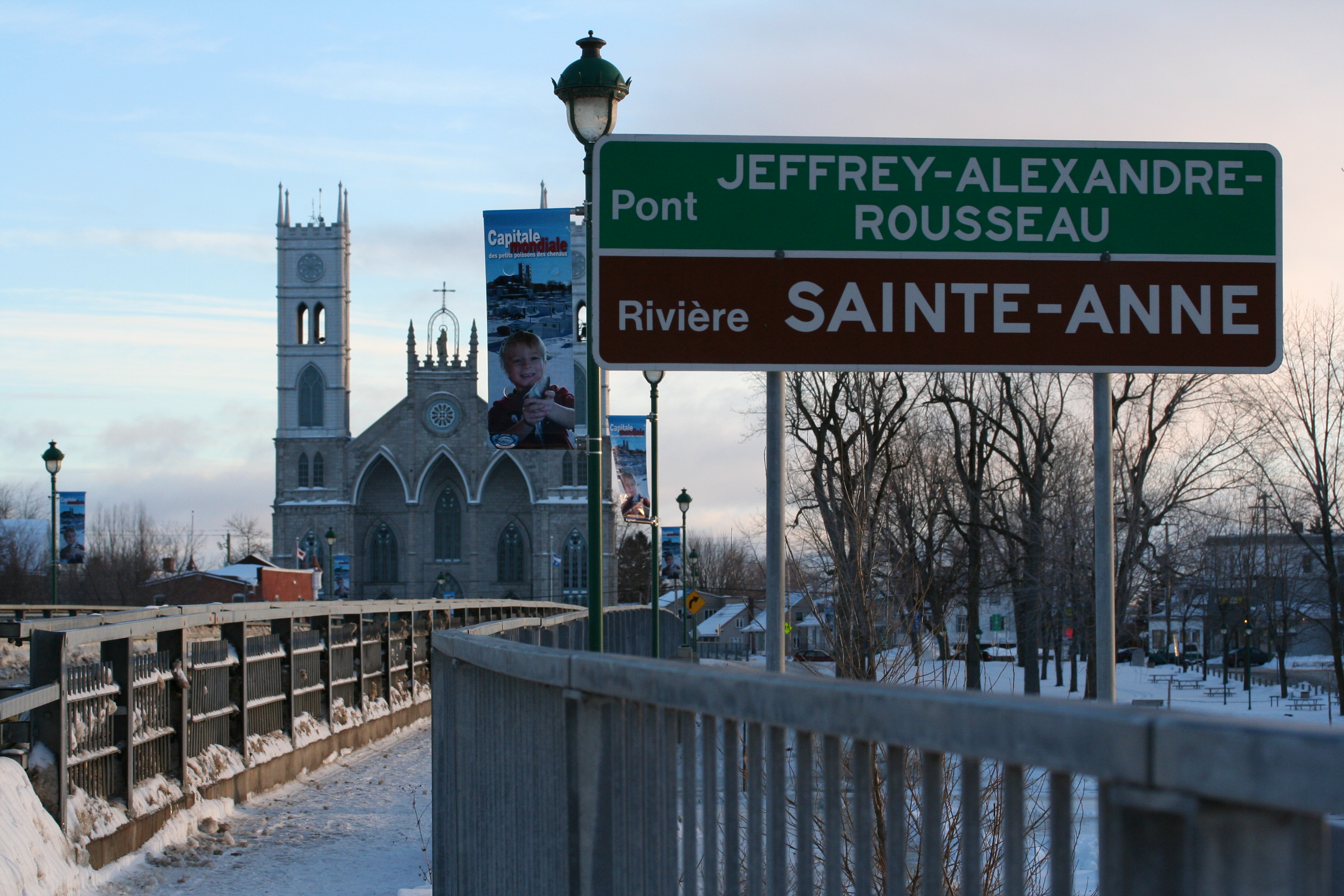
Sainte-Anne (Les Chenaux), Jeffrey-Alexandre-Rousseau Bridge, Chemin du Roy, Sainte-Anne-de-la-Pérade
Permanent watercourses tributary to major rivers

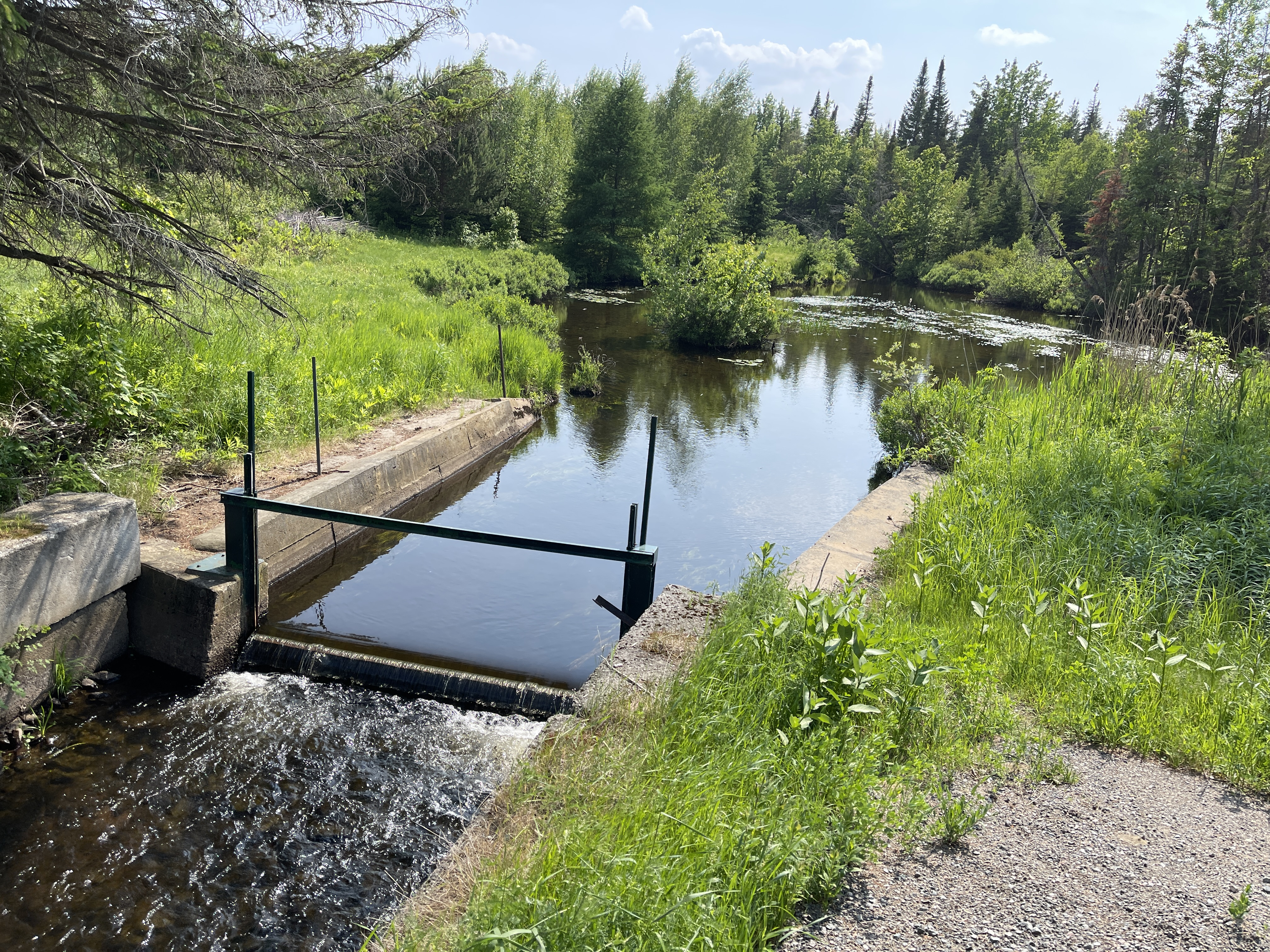
Dam, Turtle River, Lac-à-la-Tortue sector, Shawinigan

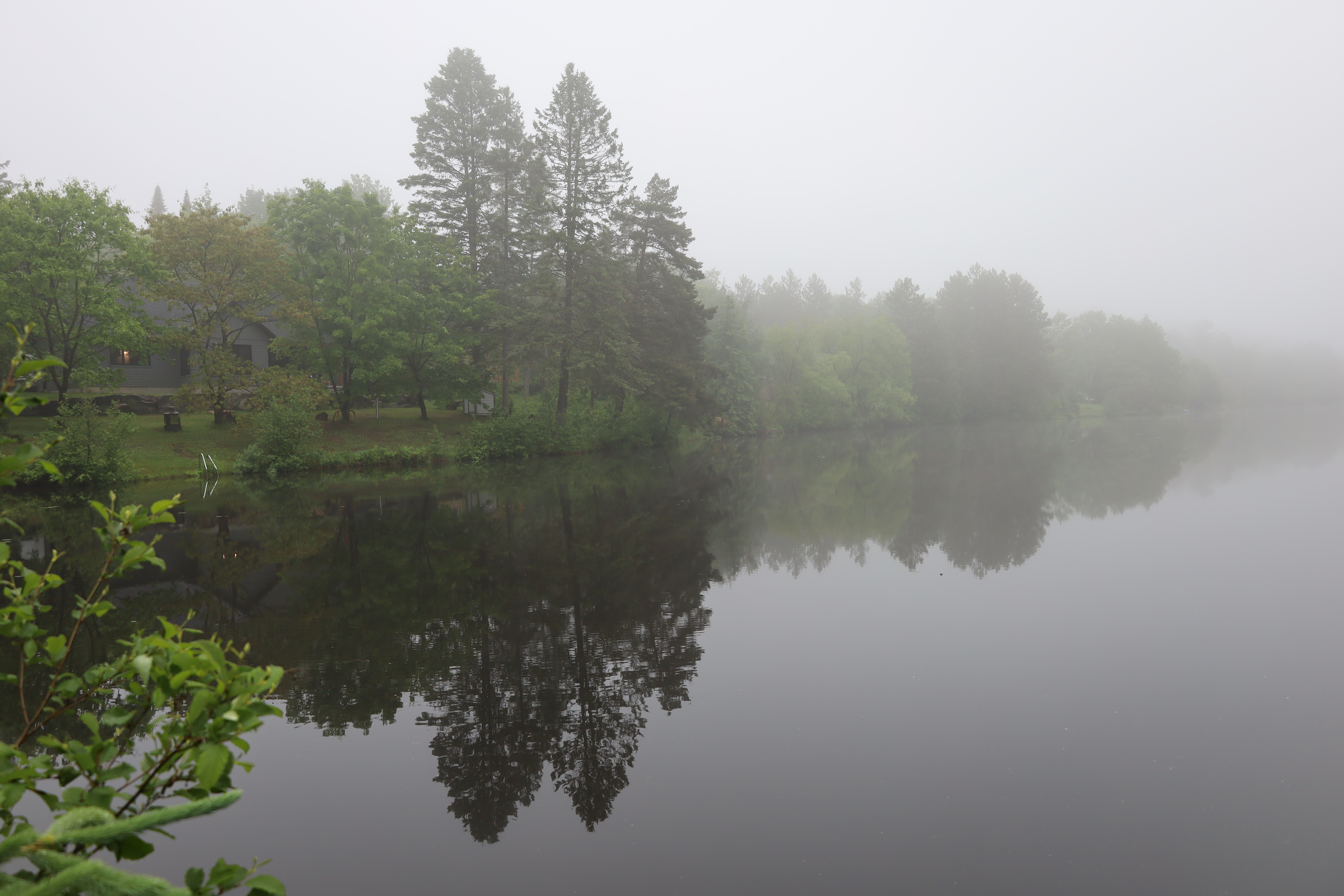
South Mékinac River, Petit Lac du Castor Road, Hérouxville

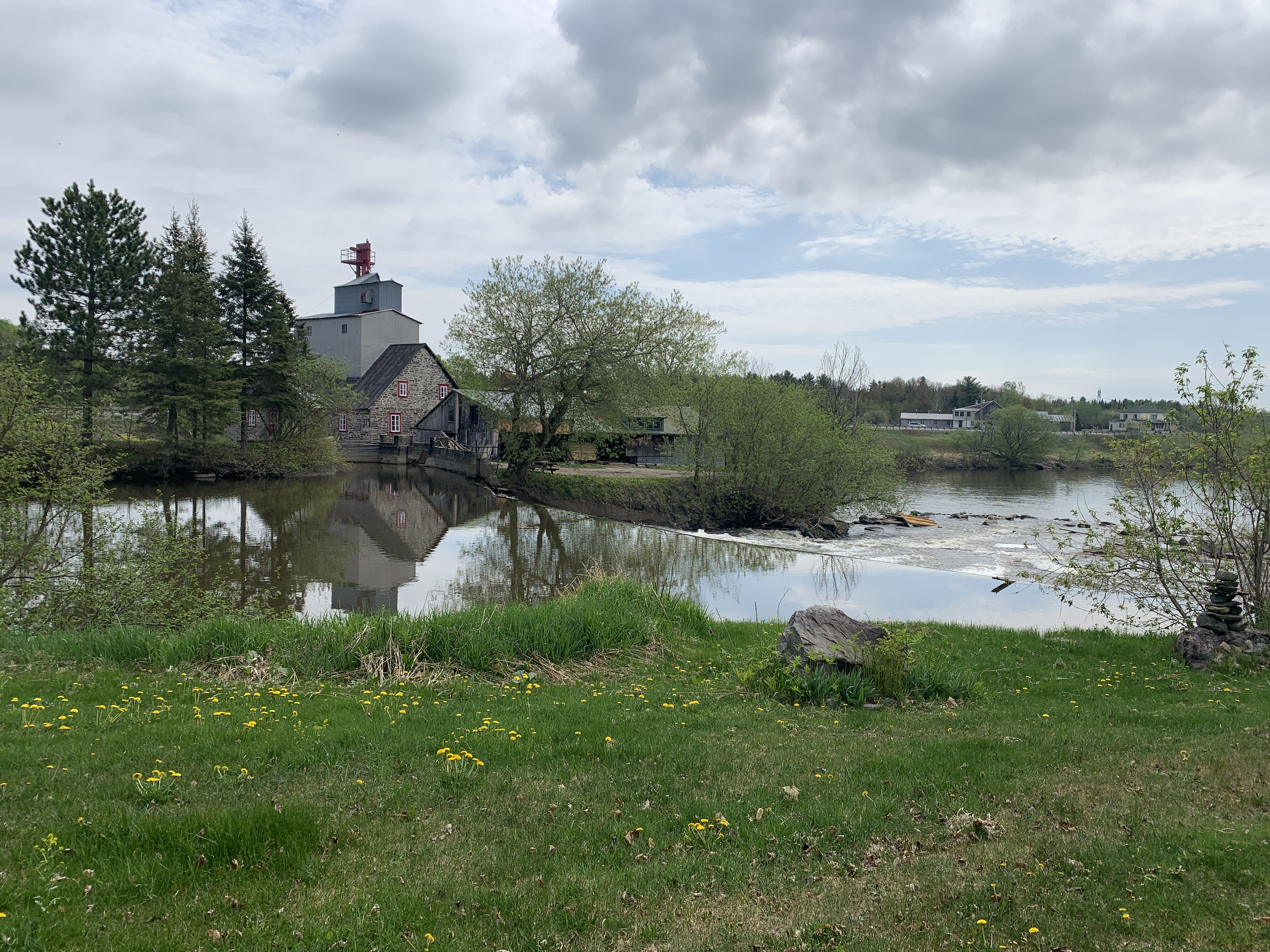
Rivière des Envies, Goulet Falls, Saint-Stanislas-de-Kostka

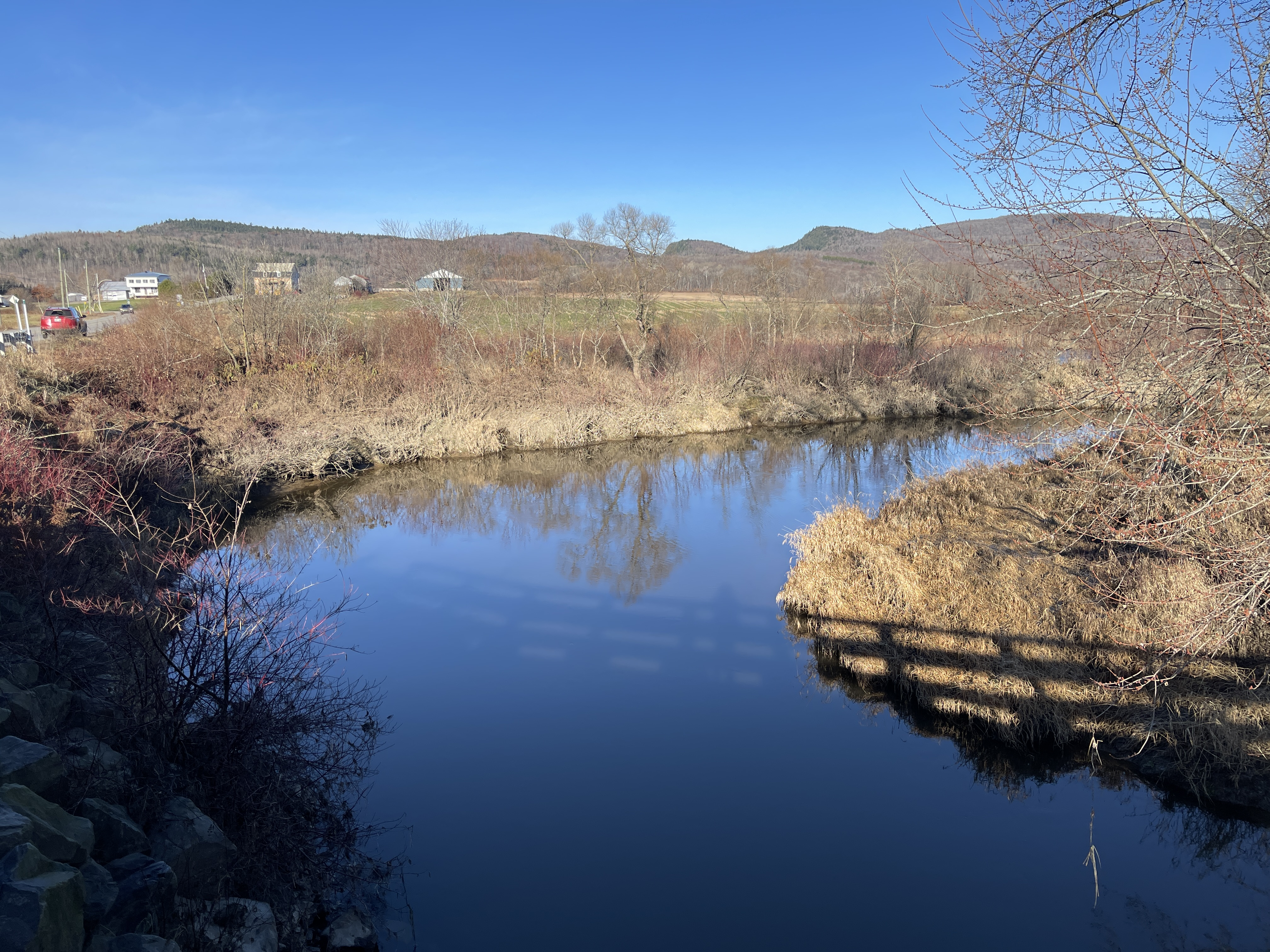
Rivière des Envies, from bridge P-03960, steel-wood (1918), rang du Haut-du-Lac Nord, Saint-Tite

== Toponymy ==
Mékinak, (Algonquin). — Lake, river and township of Champlain County. The Mékinac River flows into the Saint-Maurice twelve miles upstream of Les Piles, and 57 miles from Trois-Rivières.

A few spell it Mékinac, but the geographic office of Canada considers the ending in k. This word means turtle, and according to Father N. Caron, it was given because of a mountain that had more or less the shape of a turtle.

In the Cree idiom, this word also has the same meaning. In his lexicon of the Algonquin language, Father Cuoq translates Micinimakina as "big turtle" and brings this word of mici which would have lengthened in micini, and mikinak.
—Translate from french, source: Publications de la Société du Parler français au Canada 1906

The Algonquin Mikinak means turtle. Native Americans often referred to places based on the naming of the animal kingdom. Once well known, the toponym made it possible to refer to the same place in conversations. The designation Mikinak would have been assigned to a nearby mountain. However, it remains possible that the abundance of turtles in this portion of the territory explains this name

However, the name is also similar to the historical Algonquin word mekanâc, pronounced /me:kana:ʃ/, meaning "small path". The toponym Mekinac was assigned to the Mékinac River, Mékinac Lake, at Mékinac (township), in the ex-municipality of Saint-Joseph-de-Mékinac, Quebec, and town of Saint-Roch-de-Mékinac.

The foothills of the Laurentians are located in Saint-Tite. The Laurentide hinterland is developed for hunting and fishing; it includes, among others, the Tawachiche, Gros-Brochet and Chapeau-de-Paille zecs, as well as the Saint-Maurice Wildlife Reserve

== Municipalities of RCM Mékinac ==
The RCM has 14 entities

Municipality	Status	Surface km2	Population (2011)	Density hab./km2
Grandes-Piles	Village municipality	120.53	361	3.0
Hérouxville	Parish municipality	53.04	1,340	25.3
Lac-aux-Sables	Parish municipality	270.38	1,373	5.1
Lac-Boulé	Unorganized area	22.96	0	0.0
Lac-Masketsi	Unorganized area	213.29	0	0.0
Lac-Normand	Unorganized area	2,038.09	5	0.0
Notre-Dame-de-Montauban	Municipality	165.37	747	4.5
Rivière-de-la-Savane	Unorganized area	1,088.02	0	0.0
Saint-Adelphe	Parish municipality	137.45	952	6.9
Saint-Roch-de-Mékinac	Parish municipalityh	144.59	438	3.0
Saint-Séverin	Parish municipality	62.28	860	13.8
Saint-Tite	City	92.53	3,880	41.9
Sainte-Thècle	Municipality	213.46	2,478	11.6
Trois-Rives	Municipality	603.94	490	0.8
Total		5,226.08	12,919	2.47

Some municipalities of the MRC

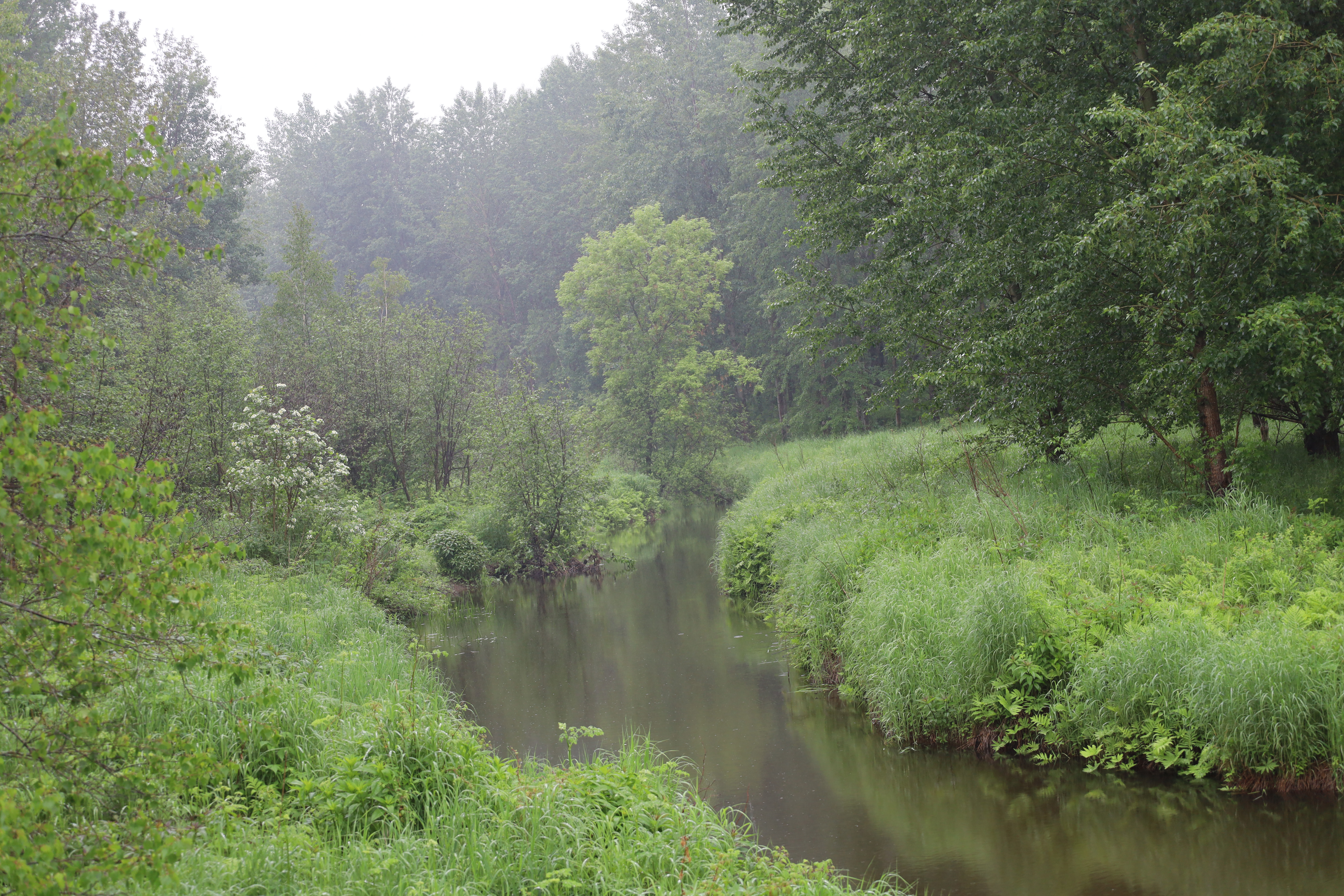
Rivière à la Tortue, rang Saint-Pierre Sud, Hérouxville

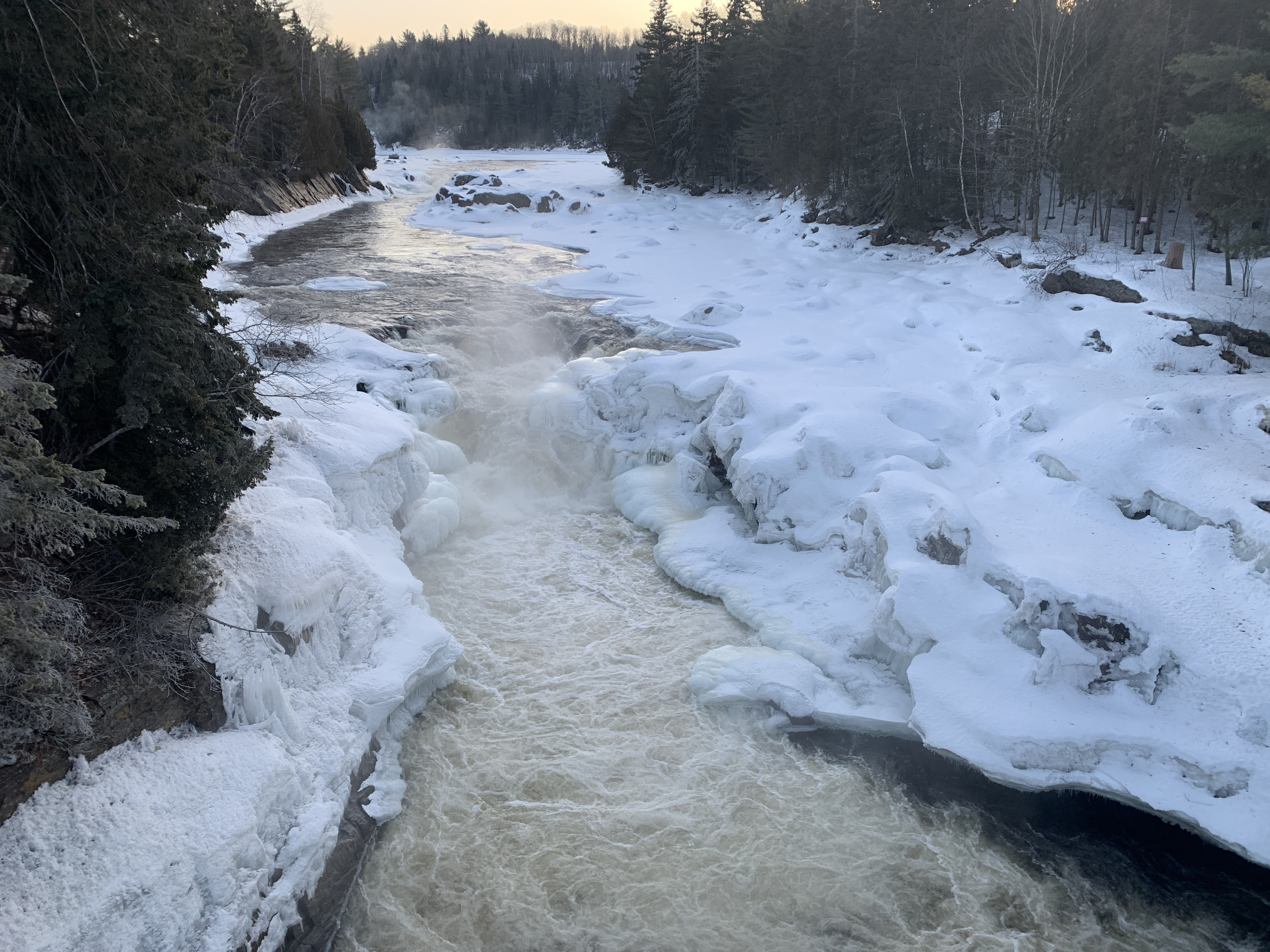
Batiscan River, spring flood, Notre-Dame-de-Montauban

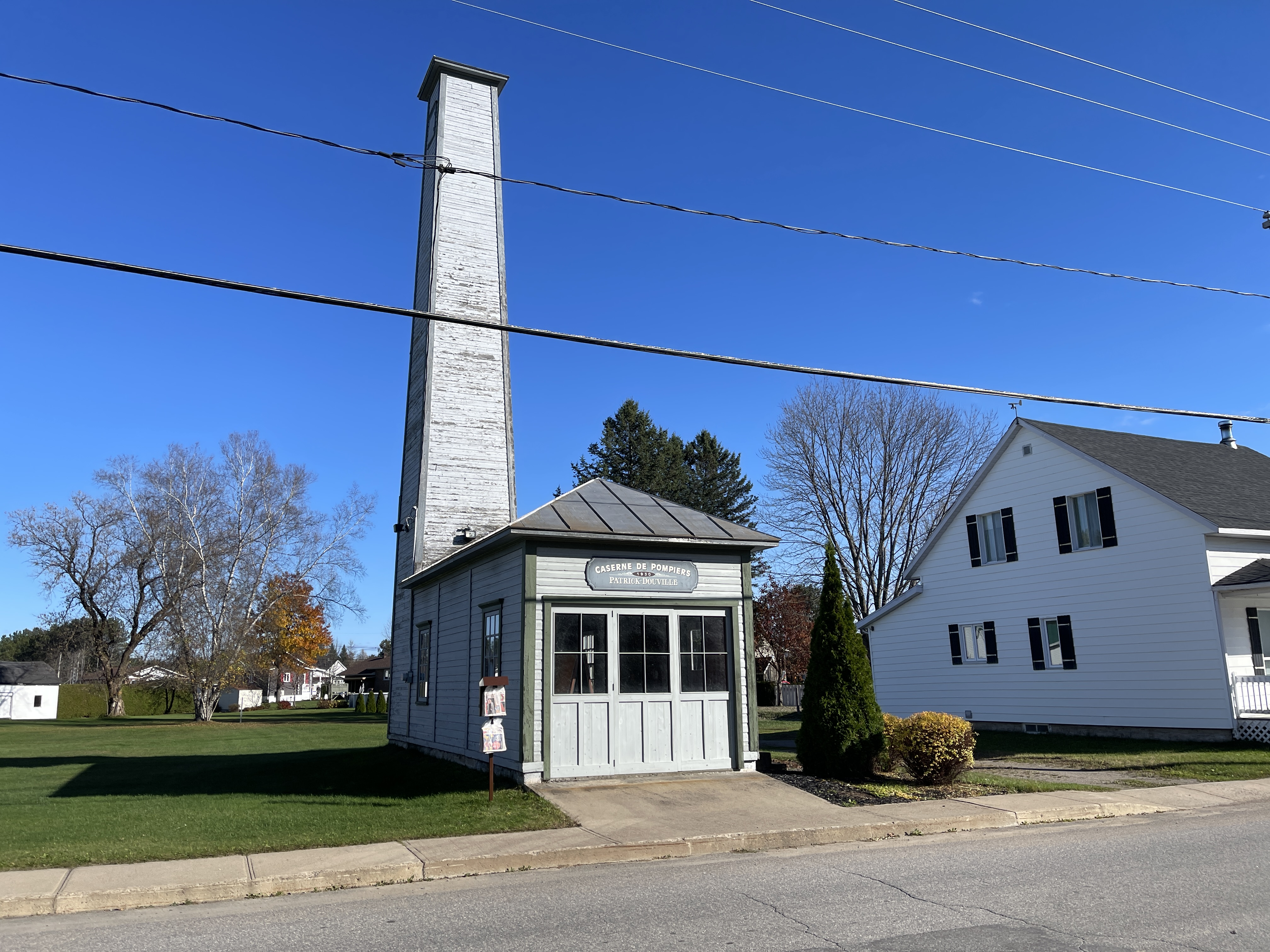
Patrick Douville Fire Station (1930), Principale Street, Saint-Adelphe

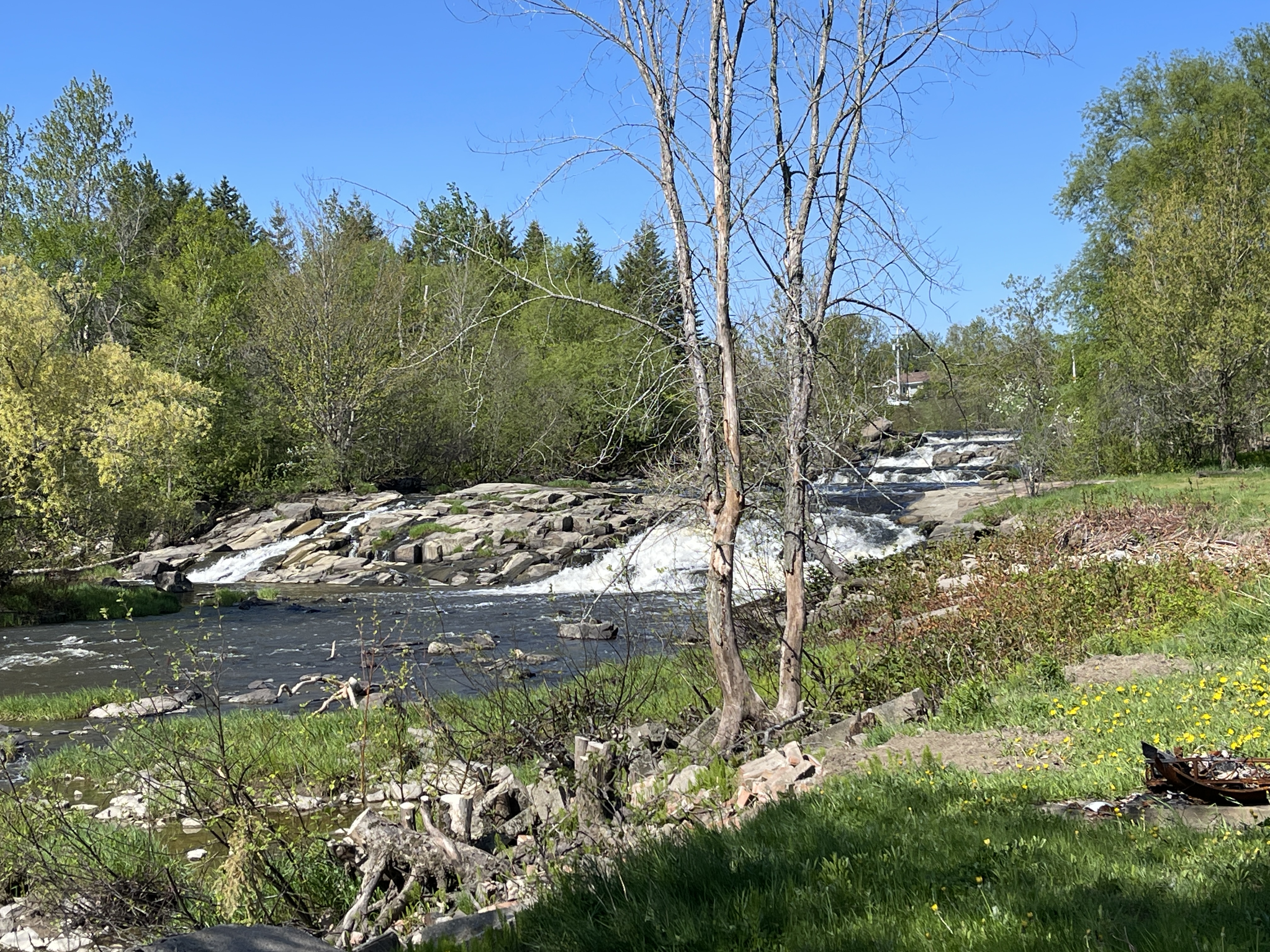
Rivière des Envies, chemin des Moulins, Saint-Séverin

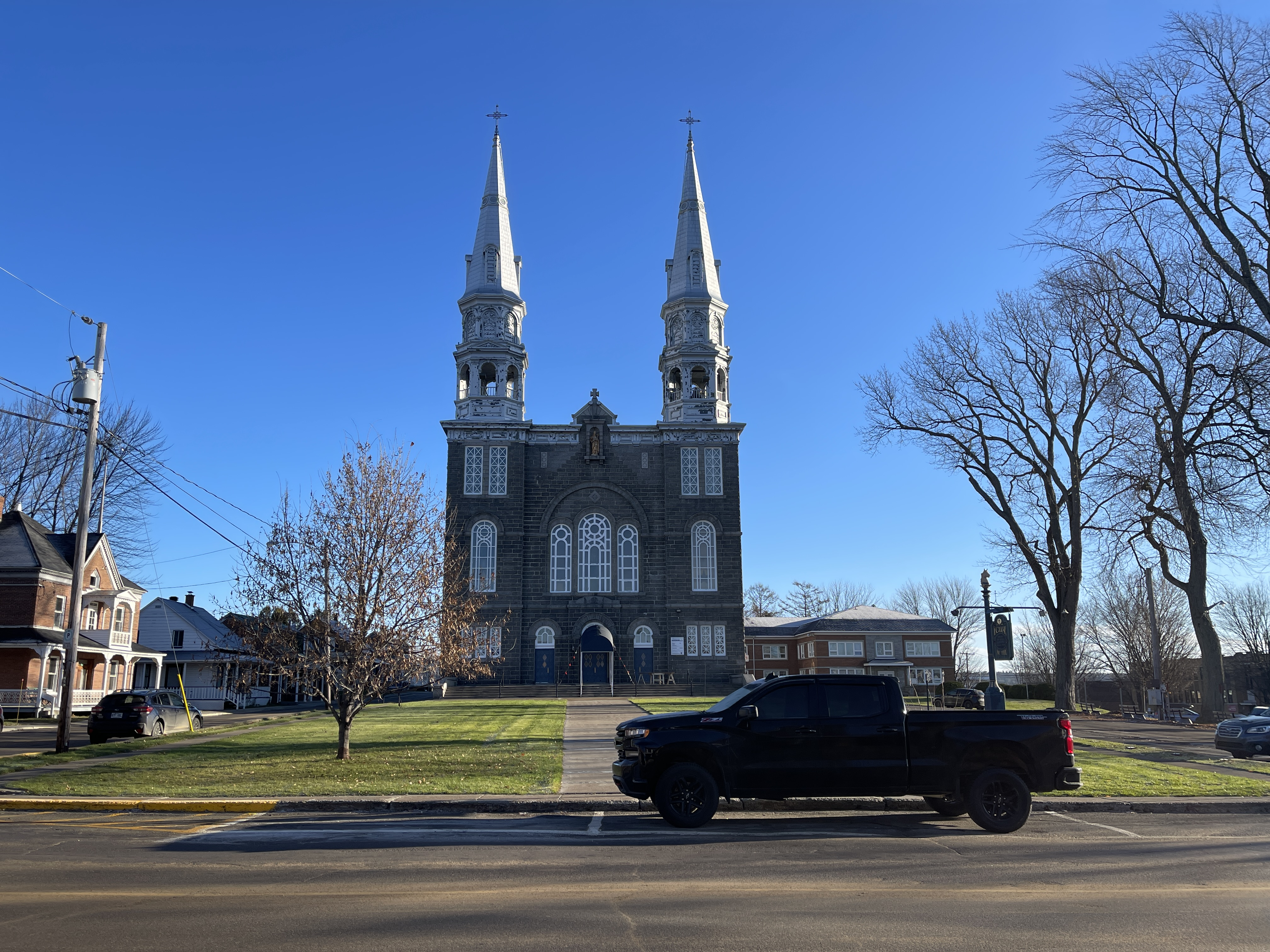
Catholic Church and Presbytery, Notre-Dame Street, Saint-Tite

Between 2006 and 2011, the population grew by 2.0%. The RCM has 8,237 private dwellings whose 6,096 private dwellings are occupied by usual residents. The median age of the population is 52.6 years old. Statistics Canada reports that in 2011, 88.5% of the population was aged 15 and over, meanings 11,430 individuals (including 5700 men and 5730 women), divided into 3,940 private households. This census indicates that 2,070 people lived alone. Of this population, 1,880 individuals have mastered both French and English, or 14.6%.

== Transportation ==
=== Access routes ===
Highways and numbered routes that run through the municipality, including external routes that start or finish at the county border:

- Autoroutes
  - None
- Principal Highways
  - R-153
  - R-155
  - R-159
- Secondary Highways
  - R-352
  - R-363
  - R-367
- External Routes
  - None

== See also ==
- Atlas de l’eau, Ministère de l’Environnement, de la Lutte contre les changements climatiques, de la Faune et des Parcs Québec (French)
- Plan directeur de l’eau de la rivière Batiscan, Société d’aménagement et de mise en valeur du bassin de la Batiscan (SAMBBA) (2015), 359 pages (French)
- Cartographie et géomatique, MRC de Mékinac (French)
- List of regional county municipalities and equivalent territories in Quebec(French)
- Batiscanie, Quebec
- Batiscan River
- Rivière des Envies
- North Mékinac River
- South Mékinac River
- Rivière du milieu (Mékinac)
- Rivière aux eaux mortes (Mékinac)
- Tawachiche River
- Tawachiche West River
- Pierre-Paul River
- Saint-Maurice River
- Mékinac River
- Mékinac Lake
- Missionary Lake
- Lake Jesuit
- Lake Traverse (Mékinac)
- Regional County Municipality
- Irénée-Marie Ecological Reserve
- Grande-Anse (Mékinac) (hamlet)
