= Saint-Roch-de-Mékinac =

- Parish municipality
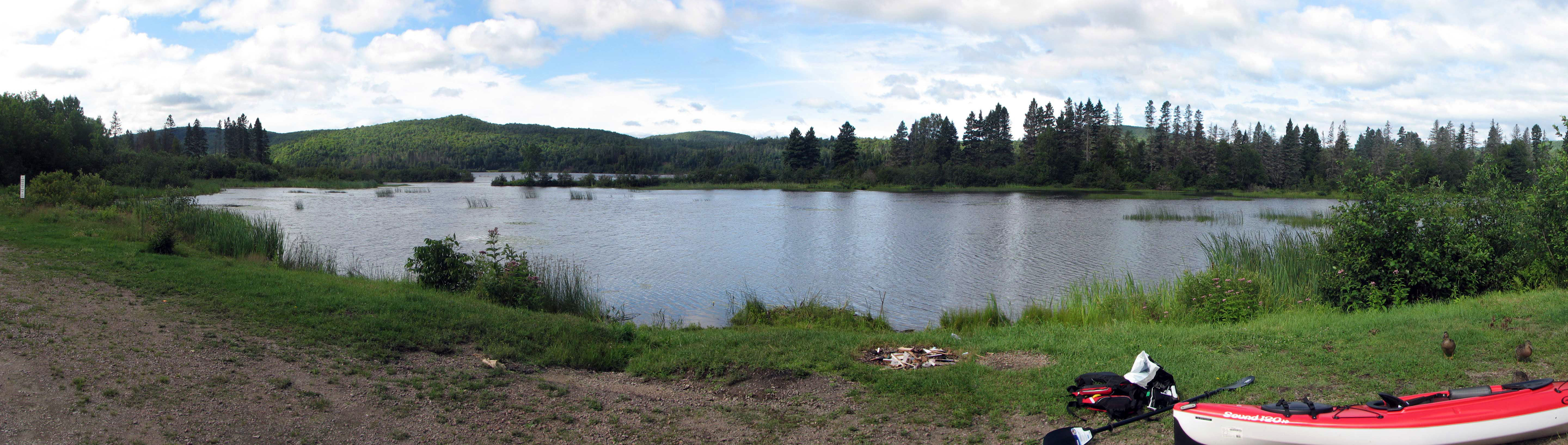
- Mauricie National Park

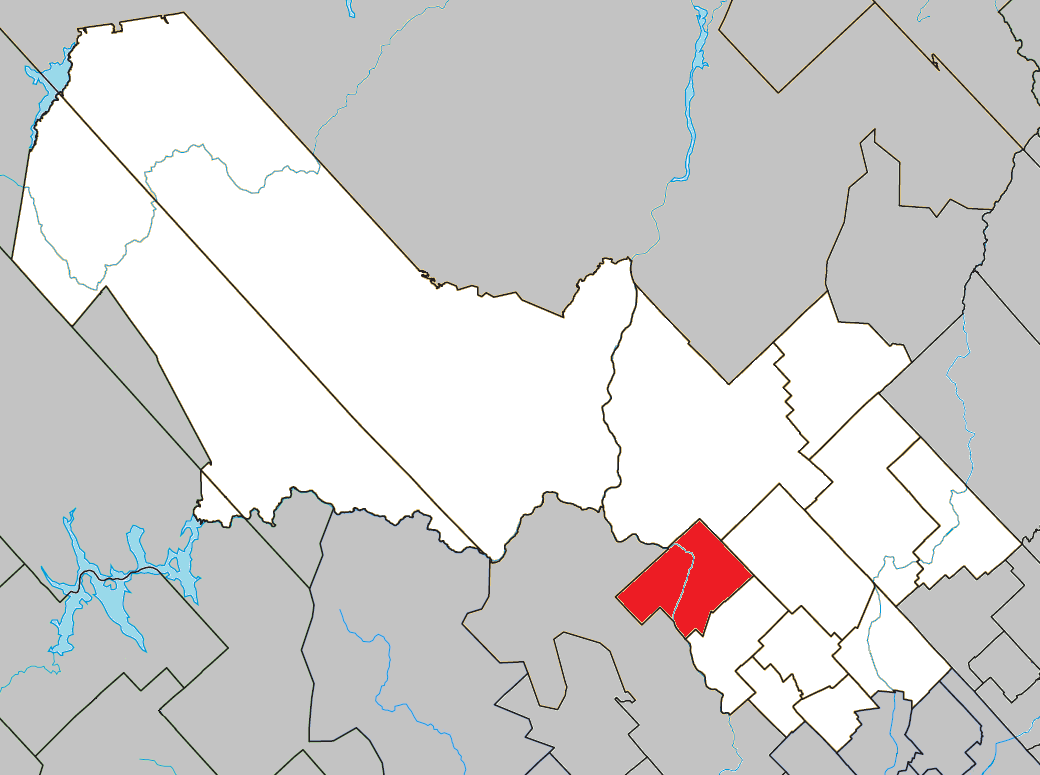
- Location within Mékinac RCM

- Location in central Quebec
- Coordinates: 46°49′N 72°46′W
- Country: Canada
- Province: Quebec
- Region: Mauricie
- RCM: Mékinac
- Constituted: November 2, 1905

Government
  - Mayor: Alain Richard
  - Fed. riding: Saint-Maurice—Champlain
  - Prov. riding: Laviolette

Area
  - Total: 153.72 km^{2} (59.35 sq mi)
  - Land: 144.52 km^{2} (55.80 sq mi)

Population (2021)
  - Total: 304
  - Density: 2.1/km^{2} (5.4/sq mi)
  - Change 2016-21: ▲0.7%
  - Dwellings: 295
- Time zone: UTC−5 (EST)
  - Summer (DST): UTC−4 (EDT)
- Postal code(s): G0X 2E0
- Area code(s): 819
- Highways: R-155 R-159
- Website: www.strochdemekinac.com

Saint-Roch-de-Mékinac (French pronunciation: [sɛ̃ ʁɔk də mekinak]) is a parish municipality in the Mékinac Regional County Municipality, in administrative region of Mauricie, in the province of Quebec in Canada.

The Saint-Roch parish was named in honour of Roch of Montpellier. The term Mékinac is associated with several homonyms of place names in the sector: Mékinac River, Saint-Joseph-de-Mékinac and Mékinac Lake.

== Geography ==
Municipal territory covers both side of Saint-Maurice River, including a small portion of La Mauricie National Park. The village of Saint-Roch-de-Mékinac is located at the top of a hill on Eastern side of Saint-Maurice River.

== Demographics ==
In the 2021 Census of Population conducted by Statistics Canada, Saint-Roch-de-Mékinac had a population of 304 living in 174 of its 295 total private dwellings, a change of 0.7% from its 2016 population of 302. With a land area of 144.52 km^{2} (55.80 sq mi), it had a population density of 2.1/km^{2} (5.4/sq mi) in 2021.

Historical census populations – Saint-Roch-de-Mékinac

Year	Pop.	±%
1911	316	—
1921	329	+4.1%
1931	319	−3.0%
1941	431	+35.1%
1951	360	−16.5%
1956	441	+22.5%
1961	413	−6.3%

Year	Pop.	±%
1966	400	−3.1%
1971	350	−12.5%
1976	334	−4.6%
1981	311	−6.9%
1986	219	−29.6%
1991	292	+33.3%
1996	298	+2.1%

Year	Pop.	±%
2001	306	+2.7%
2006	324	+5.9%
2011	438	+35.2%
2016	302	−31.1%
2021	304	+0.7%

Source: Statistics Canada

Mother tongue (2021):

- English as first language: 1.7%
- French as first language: 96.7%
- English and French as first languages: 0%
- Other as first language: 1.7%

== See also ==
- Lake Roberge (Grandes-Piles)
- Matawin River
