= USS Mackinaw =

Gunboat of the United States Navy

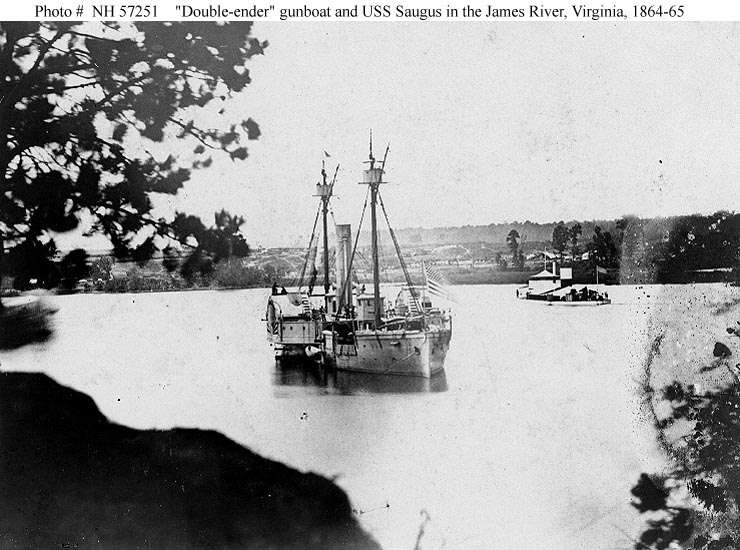
- USS Mackinaw in the James River, ca. 1865–65

History
- Laid down: 1863
- Launched: 22 April 1863
- Decommissioned: 4 May 1867
- Fate: Sold 3 October 1867

General characteristics
- Class & type: Sassacus-class gunboat
- Displacement: 974 tons
- Length: 206 ft
- Beam: 35 ft
- Draft: 9 ft
- Installed power: Vertical beam steam engine
- Propulsion: Sidewheels
- Speed: 14 knots
- Armament: 2 × 100-pdr Parrott rifle; 4 × 9-inch smoothbore; 2 × 24-pdr smoothbore; 1 × heavy 12-pdr; 1 × 12-pdr rifle

USS Mackinaw was a 974-ton sidewheel gunboat of the United States Navy which saw service during the American Civil War.

== Service ==
Mackinaw, built at the New York Navy Yard in 1863, was launched 22 April 1863, and commissioned at New York 23 April 1864, Comdr. J. C. Beaumont in command.

Mackinaw joined the North Atlantic Blockading Squadron, starting picket duty on the James River in May and remaining on the river for most of 1864. She destroyed the steamer Georgiana McCaw 5 June and supported Union troops on their advance from Dutch Gap, Va., 11 August.

Transferred to the Wilmington blockade, Mackinaw chased a steamer 7 November and captured schooner Mary east of Charleston 3 December. She participated in the attacks on Fort Fisher 24 and 25 December and 13 and 14 January 1865. She went into action against Fort Anderson 18 February, shelling the works at Port Royal until the latter part of April. She was ordered to Portsmouth, New Hampshire, 26 April and decommissioned 11 May.

Recommissioned 18 January 1866, Mackinaw served in the North Atlantic Squadron and in the West Indies until decommissioning 4 May 1867. She was sold at public auction at Philadelphia 3 October 1867.
