= Lejeune Township =

Coordinates: 46°55′N 72°35′W

The Lejeune Township (French: Canton Lejeune) is located in the MRC Mekinac Regional County Municipality, in Mauricie, Quebec, Canada.

== Geography ==
Located south of Mekinac Township and west of Marmier Township, Lejeune township straddles two municipal territories:

- The municipality of Sainte-Thècle (north-west). This sector consists of six rows located between the row 1 Trois-Rives and row C-Northern in Sainte-Thècle. The southwestern boundary of the Township (backed Grandes-Piles and Saint-Roch-de-Mékinac) intersects the Archange Lake (Mékinac) and Vlimeux Lake. The southeastern boundary of the township begins at the north end of Lake Traverse (Mékinac) by the road of Lake-of-Jesuit, the southeastern boundary is located between the lake and the Aylwin Lake Traverse (Mékinac). The northern boundary of the township along more or less the western shore of Missionary Lake (southern part), and more distance from the northern part of the lake. The northwestern boundary of the Township cuts "Thom lake".
- The "unorganized territory" of Lac-Masketsi, Quebec, located north of the municipality of Lac-aux-Sables. The south-eastern sector of the township is backed by the "rank VI Price" of Lac-aux-Sables, while the northern part of the township is backed "row Southwest Tawachiche" of Marmier (township).

The territory of Lejeune Township depends on two watersheds :

- The Batiscanie, Quebec as the area of Lake Jesuit flows into the Rivière des Envies which rises in Lake Traverse (Mékinac) in Sainte-Thècle. This river flows into the Batiscan River in Saint-Stanislas;
- The Mekinac River, which is mainly supplied by Mékinac Lake and its main tributary Missionary Lake.

Lejeune township is mostly forest land. Logging has been the engine of the economy of this region. Today, tourist activities are very popular, including resorts, hunting, fishing, water sports, ATVs, snowmobiles, excursions on foot in the forest and climbing some cliffs.

The main roads are :

- The "chemin Joseph St. Amant" starting at Route 159 (linking Saint-Tite to Saint-Roch-de-Mékinac) from Lake Roberge and ends at the north end of Lake Jesuitto Sainte-Thècle;
- "Chemin du lac" (Lake Road) that connects the Lake Traverse (Mékinac) in Lake Jesuit. While the path connects the Lejeune Township Lake Jesuit to the road of Joseph St. Amant;
- The "road to the Missionary Lake", from Hervey-Jonction. This road runs along the west shore of the southern part of Missionary Lake;
- The northern "missionary lake" is accessible by road from the town of Saint-Joseph-de-Mékinac in the Municipality of Trois-Rives, Quebec, following northward road of the "Mékinac Lake" 8.5 kilometres (5.3 mi) from the church, and the way "Missionary Lake" on 4.2 kilometres (2.6 mi). In addition, the north side of Missionary Lake North has a limited road 2.9 kilometres (1.8 mi) from the road "Way Missionary lake" because of steep mountains.
- The northern part of Canton Lejeune (in territory of Sainte-Thècle) is also available from the Saint-Joseph Road in the village of Saint-Joseph-de-Mékinac in the Municipality of Trois-Rives by the Lejeune Road and Vlimeux Lake.

== Toponymy ==
Already named in 1873, the Canton Lejeune was proclaimed on September 4, 1892, in the Gazette officielle du Québec, at the same time as Marmier (township) to the east. In this township, several lakes are named after the Jesuit missionary Paul Le Jeune, such as Missionary Lake, Lake Jesuit, and Lac Le Jeune.

Paul Young was born in 1591 to Calvinist parents in Chalons-sur-Marne, in Champagne (Vitry-le-François, France). He converted to Catholicism at the age of 16 years. In 1632, Paul Le Jeune was appointed superior of the Jesuit mission in Canada. He was assigned to Quebec when David Kirke's group ceded the city they occupied since 1629. Upon his arrival in New France, he learned Indian languages and performs several exploration excursions. In the exercise of his priestly ministry, he devoted himself to writing an annual reports, which was sent to France. The Relations of Jesuits in New France is one of the main sources of history. Back in France in 1649, he was appointed Attorney Jesuit mission of Canada. He died in Paris in 1664.

The name "Canton Lejeune" was officially registered 4 February 1982 in the register of place names of the Commission de toponymie du Québec (Geographical Names Board of Québec).

== See also ==
- Maxime Masson
- Rivière des Envies
- Lordship of Sainte-Anne-de-la-Pérade
- Laviolette (electoral district)
- Champlain (federal electoral district)
- List of township municipalities in Quebec
