= Archange Lake =

Lake in Grandes-Piles, Quebec, Canada

- Archange Lake in Batiscanie, in Quebec
- Location: Sainte-Thècle and Grandes-Piles, Quebec, Canada
- Coordinates: 46°47′58″N 72°37′37″W
- Lake type: Natural
- Basin countries: Canada
- Max. length: 2.45 km (1.52 mi)
- Max. width: 1.3 km (0.81 mi)
- Max. depth: 90 m (300 ft)
- Surface elevation: 333 m (1,093 ft)

The Lake Archange is located at the boundary of Sainte-Thècle and Grandes-Piles, in the Mekinac Regional County Municipality, in Mauricie, in Quebec, Canada.

== History ==
The first access road to the lake was designed in 1889 by the "Trois-Rivières Hunting Club". "Domaines du Lac Archange" (Sites of Archange Lake) area are arranged on the peninsula.

The Archange lake is well-known because of its fire lookout tower that was built on top of the so-called "lake Archange mountain", which has been in operation since the early 20th century. Historian Gaétan Veillette published in 1974 that several towermen have succeeded in the history of Sainte-Thècle, including Émile Bacon for 17 years, at "Lac Profond" (Deep Lake) and Lake Archange; Elzéar Plamondon, worked for a long time at Lake Veillette; Oscar Plamondon for 16 years; Georges Darveault, Alfred Darveault and Rosidé Brière. While Georges Vallée was supervisor of towermen. Considering its height, the lake Archange mountain offers an exceptional panorama to observe forest fires. Activities of forest fire observation by guards were coordinated with aerial reconnaissance airline pilots based in Lac-à-la-Tortue, which is the oldest civil seaplane base in Canada. Aerial observation of forest fires started in Mauricie in 1919.

Towermen and loggers used a system of private telephones with telephone wire that ran from 1931 to 1947. Every phone could be activated by a crank batteries powering two 6-inch round. Calls were made directly through a ring without going through an exchange. The system could provide 24 hours services between observation posts including the Hervey-Jonction, Rivière-à-Pierre, Lac-des-Iles and Archange Lake. Companies managed by Jeffrey Veillet were referring to this network to forecast forest fires and weather phenomena, including the period of log driving, cutting forest or timber transport. Marie-Ange Bacon (Sainte-Thècle) said that the fireguards repaired their own special phone, which served as a liaison.

== Geography ==
Located in forest area, the Archange lake is shaped like a large "U" opened to Southeast, with a mountainous peninsula in the center. The distance by water from one end to the other of the "U" is 2.45 kilometers. The lake has a maximum width of 1.3 km in the northern part. The water level is 333 meters above the level of the sea. The maximum depth is 90 feet.

This sector of the Mid-Mauricie and Batiscanie, Quebec, is surrounded by high mountains, especially eastward toward Lake Veillette, and southward before the lake Veilleux where Mountain of fire Watchtower reaches about 460 meters in altitude. Starting at Lake Fountain Road in Grandes-Piles, a sometimes bumpy road of 7.6 km moves eastward and achieves the Fire Tower guard at the top of the highest mountain in the region. This trip pass at the South of Fontaine Lake and the "Lac à la truite" (lake trout).

The mouth of Archange Lake flows eastward along the bottom of a strait. The route of the discharge is 4.5 km (measured by water) flowing fully in Sainte-Thècle, recovering landfill of Lake Veillette (0.54 km long and discharging to the South) and "Lac des hauteurs" (lake of the heights) (0.54 km long and discharging to the North).

The Archange lake is surrounded by several small lakes whose height "lac du Caribou" (Reindeer Lake), Marie Lake and Marguerite Lake. The mouth of the Archange lake is located 13 km north of the Catholic Church Saint-Tite through the "Chemin des Pointes" (Road of Tips) and 12.9 km from the Church of Sainte-Thècle through St. Joseph Road South. Between the mouth of Lake Archange and Saint-Joseph-South path Sainte-Thècle, mountain road has a length of 4.3 km.

In the part of Sainte-Thècle, the Archange Lake is located in the North Row C and Row VI Southwest of Lejeune Township. One of the forks of the access road to the lake can reach the tip of the large peninsula, the other fork pass on the South side of the lake. The northern and eastern parts are very mountainous.

== Toponymy ==
On Christian origin, the place name "Lac Archange" (MRC Mekinac) was formalized on December 5, 1968, at the Bank of place names of the Commission de toponymie du Québec (Geographical Names Board of Québec).

== See also ==
- Sainte-Thècle
- Grandes-Piles
- Rivière des Envies
- Lordship of Sainte-Anne-de-la-Pérade
- Lordship of Batiscan
- Mekinac Regional County Municipality
- Batiscanie, Quebec
