= Lake Jesuit =

Lake in Sainte-Thècle, Quebec

- "Lake Jesuit" in Batiscanie, in Quebec
- Location: Sainte-Thècle, Quebec, Canada
- Coordinates: 46.883°N 72.589°W
- Type: Natural
- Max. length: 5.4 kilometres (3.4 mi)
- Max. width: 0.65 km (0.40 mi)
- Surface area: 3.32 square kilometres (1.28 sq mi)
- Max. depth: 41.7 m (137 ft)

The Lake Jesuit (popularly designated "Little Long Lake") is located in the Lejeune Township, in the municipality of Sainte-Thècle, in the Mékinac Regional County Municipality in the Batiscanie, in the administrative region of Mauricie in the province of Quebec, in Canada. The forestry sector has marked the economy. Today, tourist activities, especially the resort, are increasing rapidly. An important hamlet of chalets is located around the northern part of the lake. While several cottages on the south side are accessible only by water or mountain biking, but they are accessible in winter on the ice.

== Geography ==
Located in the north of Sainte-Thècle, this lake has a surface of 3.32 square kilometres (1.28 sq mi) and a total length of 5.4 kilometres (3.4 mi). The maximum depth of the lake is the Jesuit 41.7 metres (137 ft). Transparency of water is estimated at 8.2 m (27 ft).

Its shape has two water bodies whose main has the shape of the peninsula of Italy, with a length of 3.8 kilometres (2.4 mi) in the north-south axis, and a maximum width of 0.65 kilometres (0.40 mi). Northwest, pass around 0.6 kilometres (0.37 mi) connects the second body of water that has a length of 1.5 kilometres (0.93 mi) (north to south) by 1.7 kilometres (1.1 mi) (east to west). This second lake has three large bays and an island.

Roads surrounding

By road, the northern part of the lake is reachable by bypassing the mountains from the west, from the mouth of the lake, just follow the path of the Jesuit Lake (west), the road Lejeune Township (passing near Chnabail lakes) to route Joseph Saint-Amand where you have to turn right (heading north) and spend almost three lakes Champlain. Because of the mountains, there is no waggon road on the east side of the southern part of the lake to the Baptist lakes, three lakes Grandbois, lakes of the Center and Lake one mile. However, the "chemin des érables" (from the route Joseph Saint-Amand and southbound) serves the northern part of the lake (east side), up to a large bay. While the "chemin des cèdres" is serving west side of the northern part of the lake.

== Location ==
In 1933 and 1945, a total of 17,000 brook trout fry were stocked. In 1970, only four species of fish were living in the lake.

Located entirely in forest and mountainous areas, the Jesuit lake is 2.3 kilometres (1.4 mi) (in a direct line) southwest of Missionary Lake and 2.1 kilometres (1.3 mi) (direct line) southeast of Lac Le Jeune. Lake Jesuit is three miles from Lake Traverse and 7.3 kilometres (4.5 mi) (by road) from bridge of the Croche Lake, in the lower village of Sainte-Thècle.

The dam at the mouth of Lake Jesuit is located at the southeast end (geographic coordinates: latitude 46.8426° and longitude −72.5410°). After an initial fall at the foot of the dam, the lake outlet flows for 0.3 km in a direct line to the southeast to lake Aylwin (which is 0.4 kilometres (0.25 mi) long). The latter lake is 191 meters above sea level: 8 m below lake Jesuit. The route of the Jesuit lake outlet resumes east of Lake Aylwin 2.5 kilometres (1.6 mi) to empty into the lake from the Traverse. At 940 m before it ends, the "Décharge du lac Jésuite" (outlet of Lake Jesuit) receives the right shore waters "Ruisseau de l'Aqueduc" (Brook of Aqueduct) (about 850 m long) which drains water from "Lac de l'Aqueduc" (Lake Aqueduct) (length 320 m) whose elevation is 303 m.

In the southern part of Lake Jesuit (the East and West sides) high cliffs plunge into the lake. The top of the mountain that faces the mouth reaches 385 m. Boutet Lake is located behind this mountain at 341 feet above sea level. These cliffs are known for climbing enthusiasts. The maximum depth shown on the map is 52.9 metres (173 feet 7 inches) in the northern part of the lake. Boats can be launched close to the mouth, south of the lake, on the way-du-du-lac-Jesuit.

== History ==
Its form and extent, Lake Jesuit was an important route in the history of forestry to access licensed territories for logging and timber transport.

The company Veillet & Brothers Limited operated a sawmill (two floors) powered by steam at the southern end of the lake near the outlet. The mill was built in the summer of 1938 by workers under the direction of entrepreneurs Jeffrey Veillet and Freddy Veillet on a lot of Philorum Béland. The equipment of the mill came from the demolition of the sawmill and Veillet Brothers Limited located at Audy (Lac-aux-Sables). The first felling of hardwoods in this area (especially in the north of the lake) was in the winter 1938–1939, to be sawn at the mill in the spring. The wood was transported on the lake with a boat boom driven by steam.

In 1945, Jeffrey Veillet sold his share of the mill to his brother Freddy Veillet who continued operations until his death in 1949. Arsène Abel, son of Freddy Veillet, sold the sawmill in 1952–1953 with all the equipment, to a company that subsequently demolished the mill. Generally, about 25 to 30 employees were working at the same time at the mill.

== Toponymy ==
Lakes Le Jeune and Jesuit in the territory of Lejeune Township, referred to highlight the work of the Jesuit missionary life Paul Le Jeune (1591-1664) in New France. This gazetteer recognition extends northeast with Missionary Lake. The Geographic Board, became the Commission de toponymie du Québec (Geographical Names Board of Québec), adopted the place name "Lake Jesuit" in 1936, replacing the usual place name "Little Long Lake". The name "Lake Jesuit" was formalized as of December 5, 1968, at the "Bank of place names" of Commission de toponymie du Québec.

== See also ==
- Paul Le Jeune, founder of Trois-Rivières in 1634 and Montreal in 1642, and an explorer of the New France
- Rivière des Envies
- Batiscanie
- Missionary Lake
- Le Jeune Lake
- Lake Traverse (Mékinac)
- Sainte-Thècle
- Mekinac Regional County Municipality
- Lejeune Township
