= Croche Lake =

Lake in Sainte-Thècle, Quebec, Canada

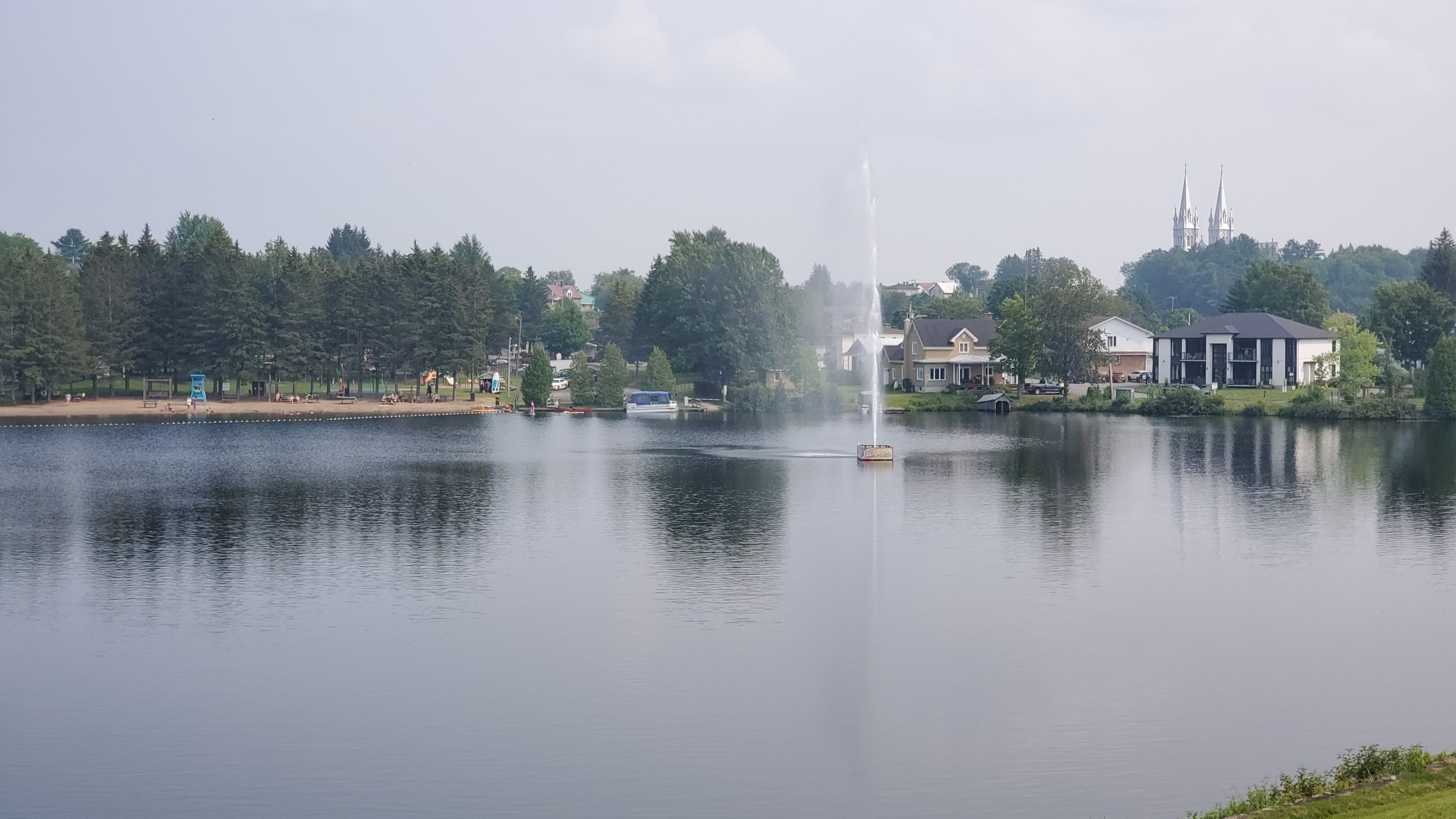
- Croche Lake, Saint-Jean municipal park and lower village, seen from chemin Saint-Michel-Nord.

- "Croche Lake (Sainte-Thècle)" in Batiscanie, in Quebec
- Location: Sainte-Thècle, Quebec
- Coordinates: 46°49′55″N 72°30′00″W
- Lake type: Natural
- Primary inflows: Discharge of "Lac des tounes" (located at Nord-East)
- Primary outflows: outlet of Croche Lake (located at the South-West)
- Basin countries: Canada
- Max. length: 3.9 km (2.4 mi)
- Max. width: 0.35 km (0.22 mi)
- Surface area: 79.32 hectares (196.0 acres)
- Max. depth: 26.52 m (87.0 ft)
- Settlements: Sainte-Thècle

Croche Lake (French: Lac Croche, pronounced [lak kʁɔʃ]) is located in Sainte-Thècle, in the Mekinac Regional County Municipality, in Mauricie, in Quebec, Canada. From the beginning of the colonization of Sainte-Thècle (from 1867), the area around the lake was used for forestry and agriculture. By the mid- 20th Century, the resort has grown intensely. Today, this lake is renowned for its recreo-touristic attractions and activities.

== Toponymy ==
Bank of place names of Commission de toponymie du Québec (Geographical Names Board of Quebec) has 293 names using the term "Croche". In the nineteenth Century, the term "Croche" has been widely adopted for naming rivers, lakes, streams and roads, during the exploration and colonization of the territories. In Quebec, a large number of homonyms "Lac Croche" create some confusion. As a result, many names "Lac Croche" are gradually replaced by more distinctive names.

The name "Lac Croche" was officially registered on December 5, 1968, at the Bank of place names of the Commission de toponymie du Québec

== Geography ==
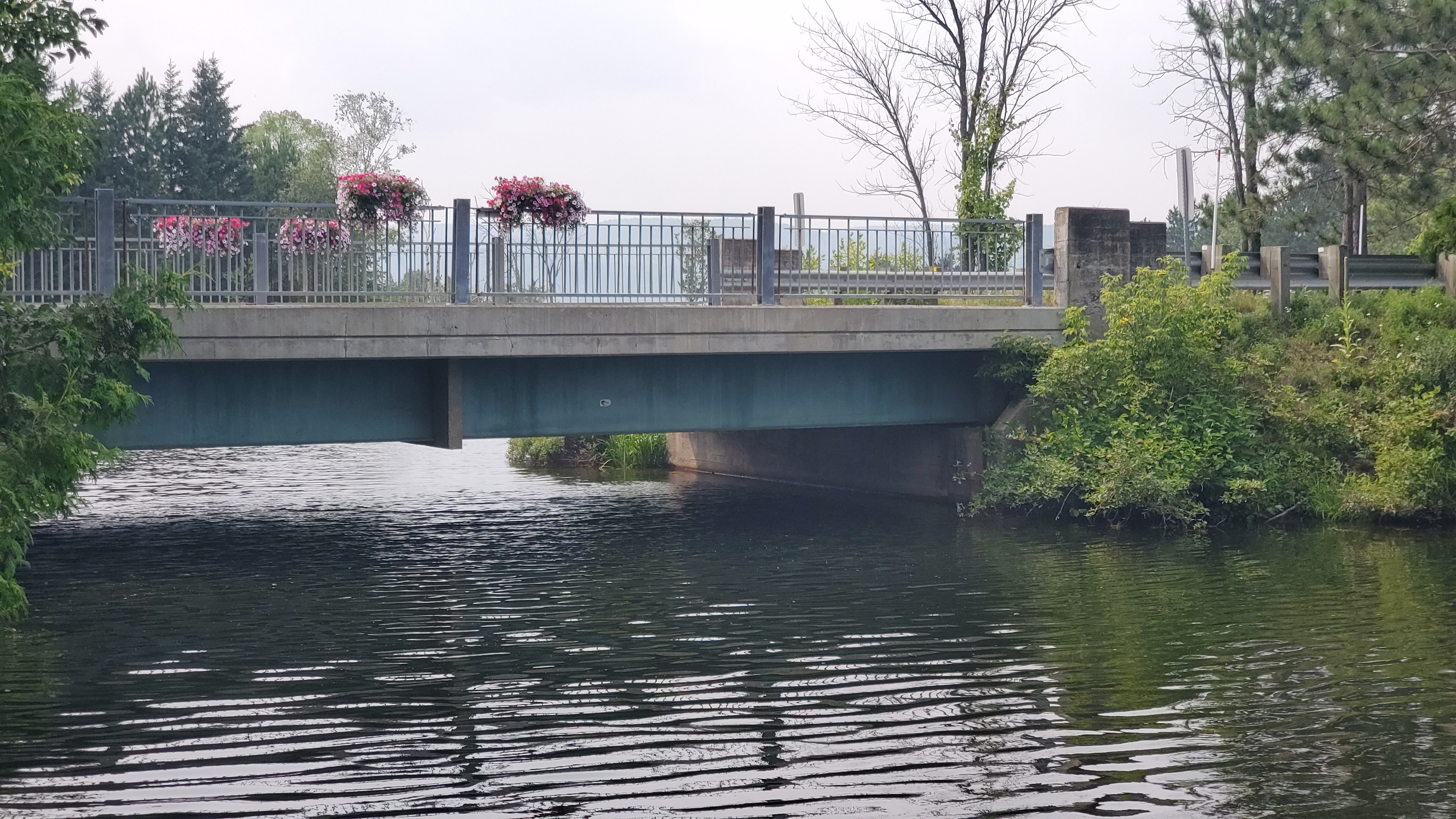
Bridge on rue Dupont, spanning Lac Croche in village of Sainte-Thècle.

Croche Lake in Sainte-Thècle is part of a series of lakes in lines in the north-south axis between Hervey-Jonction and Saint-Tite: lac en coeur (Heart Lake), lac des tounes, Croche Lake, lac-aux-chicots (snags lake), lac à la peinture (painting lake), lac Trottier, lac à la perchaude (perch lake) and former lake Kapibouska (formed by a widening of the Rivière des Envies). Due to a geological fracture of bark land, Lac-aux-chicots et lac Croche are located at the foot of a long cliff more or less regular (located on the east side of the chain of lakes).

With a length of 3.9 km (including a strait 0.4 km between the mouth and "rue Du Pont" (street of the bridge), the shape of Lake Croche in Sainte-Thècle is particularly long. The northern part of the lake (the largest in area) looks like a big cucumber slightly misshapen, with a length of 2.4 km and a maximum width of 0.32 km. A pass (approximately 0.53 km in length with a few hooks and berries), connects the northern and southern part of the lake. The connotation "Croche" is more applicable to this narrow pass. The southern part of the lake (with a length of 0.45 km and a width of 0.35 km) has the shape of a boot with the tip pointing towards the mouth of the lac, on the west side. At the center of this part, the municipality has a giant illuminated fountain.

The "Lac en Coeur" (Heart Lake) at northwest of the hamlet of Hervey-Jonction is the head lake of the "Rivière en Coeur" (Heart river) that descends to the south through the "Lac des Tounes" (Lake of Tunes) (with a length of 0,2 km). Lake outlet of "Lac des tounes" (called "Heart River") flows from the north into the "Lac Croche".

The mouth of Lake Croche (south-west) drains into a stream that connects the outlet of the "Lac-aux-Chicots" where Clement Saint-Amand had operated a sawmill at Saint–Michel-South row. The latter discharge flows into the Rivière des Envies.

St. Jean Optismist Park that was built on the south-east of the lake, in the heart of the village of Sainte-Thècle, is a popular attraction for residents and visitors, especially in summer. It has a beautiful beach, picnic tables, activity areas for children and a variety of accommodations for the organization of public events. The designated Laurent Naud waterfront promenade from the "rue du Pont" (street of the bridge) goes up to the Saint-Jean Optimist Park. From this promenade, visitors can contemplate the beauty of the lake. The development of this promenade had narrowed a segment of rue Lacordaire and imposed a one-way traffic.

== History ==
The colonization of the territory of Sainte-Thècle, located in the Lordship of Sainte-Anne-de-la-Pérade began by clearing lots of Rang Saint -Michel, which borders the west side of the "Lac aux chicots"and "Lake Croche". At the beginning of the settlement, a first rudimentary road links the "rang des Pointes" (row of spikes) Saint-Tite to forest land (further north) which was recently opened to settlement. Before the construction of roads and bridges over the culverts, ice roads on Lake Croche and "Lac-aux-Chicots" (lake of snags) and allow the families of settlers to move to winter Saint-Tite, the main business center of the region, or still to logging camps until Missionary Lake. In summer, the settlers used small boats or barges.

Around 1915, Jeffrey Veillet built the first chalet in Ste-Thècle, on the shores of Lac Croche; this chalet site was subsequently acquired by Alcide Groleau. This building was later moved to the other side of the lake, on the land of Mrs. Josaphat Veillette. Around 1920, Paul Plamondon of the company Veillette Inc had the second chalet built on the shores of Lac Croche, on a plot of land by Émile Jobin, that is to say at the north end of the lake; this site was subsequently acquired by the Gray Nuns community. In 1959, Bruno Béland, Armand Groleau and Richard Béland each built a chalet. Subsequently, Américus Jobin, Gratien Baril, Alcide Groleau and Lucien St-Amand each built a chalet there.

This chain lake is bordered on the east side by Rang Saint-Pierre, which is colonized soon after Rang Saint -Michel and Saint-Joseph.

Lac Croche served including for the floating logs headed to sawmill of Theophile Magnan and his son Napoleon Magnan, built at the mouth of Lake Croche, near the dam.

Covered bridge of Lake Croche, connecting Rang Saint-Michel North and Du Pont Street in the lower village, was demolished in July 1955 to be replaced by the current bridge.

At the coldest peak of the winter, ice on the lake was cut by men on Lake Croche with handed saw in order to fill the coolers of village or rows residents. They lifted the ice with hooks ice. A public warehouse for ice was located at the edge of the lake, near the Tessier street.

== See also ==
- Sainte-Thècle
- Rivière des Envies
- Lordship of Sainte-Anne-de-la-Pérade
- Mekinac Regional County Municipality
- Batiscanie
- Tawachiche River
- Tawachiche West River
- Batiscan River
- Lake Traverse (Mékinac)
- Lac des Chicots (Sainte-Thècle)
