= Lake Traverse (disambiguation) =

Lake Traverse is the southernmost body of water in the Hudson Bay watershed of North America located along the border between the U.S. states of Minnesota and South Dakota.

Lake Traverse or Traverse Lake may also refer to:

- Lake Traverse (Mékinac), source of the Rivière des Envies in Sainte-Thècle, Quebec, Canada
- Lake Traverse, Ontario, two adjacent unincorporated places in northeastern Ontario, Canada

== See also ==
- Lake Traverse Indian Reservation, homeland in the United States of the Sisseton–Wahpeton Oyate, a branch of the Sioux group of Native Americans
