= Jeffrey Veillet =

Canadian forestry contractor (1881-1946)

- Born: May 21, 1881
- Died: August 7, 1946 (aged 65); Grand-Mère
- Occupations: Business man in forestry industry, merchant, mayor, president of the school board
- Known for: Mayor of Sainte-Thècle (parish and village)
- Notable work: President and founder of Veillet & Frères Limitée (Veillette and Brothers Limited)

Jeffrey Veillet (May 21, 1881 - August 7, 1946) was a businessman in forestry and general trade in Mauricie, until his death in 1946. Jeffrey Veillet arrived in Sainte-Thècle in 1903. He started in business in 1905 as a logging contractor. He was president of the aqueduct company of the village of Sainte-Thècle until his death.

== Start up in business ==
Son of Leopold Veillet and Georgina Magny, Jeffrey Veillet was born May 21, 1881, in the "Rang des chutes" (rank of falls) (said rang "Veillet") in Saint-Narcisse de Champlain (Quebec). His father Leopold was a forestry entrepreneur, especially in the "Chapeau de paille" (hat of straw) area on the west bank of the Saint-Maurice River, up to Rivière-aux-Rats (Rats River).

Jeffrey Veillet moved to Sainte-Thècle in 1903, at the age of 22, and married Herminie Cossette, from Saint-Narcisse on April 26, 1904. Veillet acquired a farm in rang St-Pierre-North, where he started a business of hay and cattle; he sold this land to his brother Freddy. He bought a second farm in rang Saint-Pierre-North, close to the village of Sainte-Thècle; he operated there for five or six years and continued his trade in animals; he sold the farm to his brother Alphée in 1921. In addition, Jeffrey Veillet owned two farms in rang Saint-Thomas-South, that he operated for commercial hay, sent by train to his clients.

== Commerce in Sainte-Thècle ==
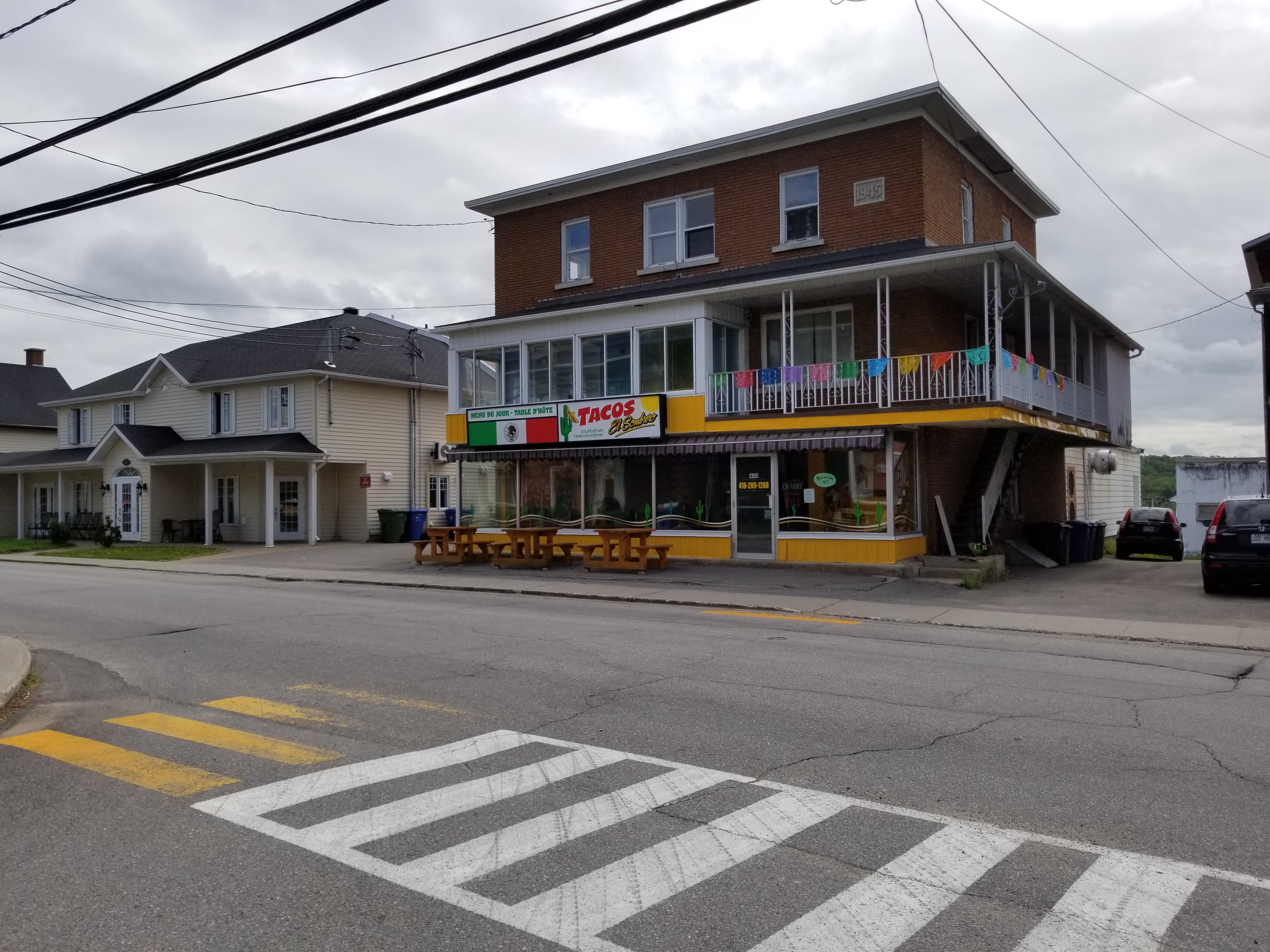
Former general store of Jeffrey Veillette, Saint-Jacques Street, in Sainte-Thècle (facing the church), in July 2018.

Around 1921, Veillet bought the Hotel Boutet, opposite to Sainte-Thècle church, that he turned into the general store. This building became the headquarters of his forestry operations. The Hotel Boutet was built around 1902 or 1903 by François Boutet, just at the beginning of the work of building the church. It has been in operation during twenty years. After the acquisition of the building, Veillet transformed the second floor in a private residence, coupled with a general store on the ground floor. The store sold almost all the needs of residents, farmers and loggers: groceries, dry goods, fabrics by the yard, clothing, dresses, ironwork, molded feed, seed, shingles, sheet, gasoline (Imperial petroleum) oil and coal. The store occupied the entire front of the building. In the back, a cooler storing ice cut on the Lac Croche in the coldest of winter, was used until about 1935 to 1936, for the needs of families Veillet and Moisan (next house).

== Forestry contractor ==
In 1920, four sons of Leopold Veillet and Georgina Magny (i.e. Jeffrey, Freddy, Alphée and Wilson) combined officially their resources to start a business. They were fully engaged in cutting and timber trade. This family of loggers already had extensive experience in the operation of forest sites in Mauricie region. In 1921, Josaphat Veillet joined his brothers and founded the company Veillette & Frères Limitée (Veillette & Brothers Limited). Two co-shareholders died a little while later: Wilson Veillet in car accidentally on August 6, 1924 and Alphée Veillet on October 1, 1927. In 1925, Jeffrey Veillet executed contracts of clearing the road from Saint-Roch-de-Mékinac to La Tuque on the east bank of Saint-Maurice River.

== Two sawmills along the Tawachiche River ==
In 1922, the company Veillet & Frères Limitée (Veillette and Brothers Limited) was awarded a contract to cut timber in the Audy area, north of Hervey-Jonction in the sector of Tawachiche River. The company then bought a small sawmill from Frank Blais, located about one kilometer south of the Audy station, on the edge of the Tawachiche River. The Veillet make enlargements to the mill. Powered by steam, the mill was operated about 16 years, until 1934, especially for cutting wood planks and beams.

The second Veillet sawmill was built on the edge of the Tawachiche River, about 500 meters north of the village of Hervey-Jonction. It was mainly used for cutting wood pulp. It ran from 1933 to 1941.

== Saw Mill in the city of Saint-Tite (1936-1938) ==
In 1936 or 1937, Jeffrey Veillet acquired from Rouleau their second sawmill located near the Rivière des Envies, in the heart of the city of Saint-Tite which was unused for several years. Although the Veillet mill in Audy was closed, Veillet & Frères Limitée continued cutting hard and soft wood in Tawachiche River area. The cut wood was then transported to the saw mill of Saint-Tite by truck. Wood also came from the lake Vlimeux area, located in Lejeune Township, at north-west of Sainte-Thècle, close to Grandes-Piles limit. The Saint-Tite mill ceased operations in the fall of 1938. Facilities at this mill were demolished a few years later.

== Sawmill at Lake Jesuit, in Sainte-Thècle ==
In the summer of 1938, Jeffrey and Freddy Veillet built another sawmill at the south end of Lake Jesuit in Sainte-Thècle, near the outlet. The equipment of the mill came from the demolition of the old mill located in Audy (North of Hervey-Jonction). In the area north of Lake Jesuit, the first logging of hardwood were conducted in winter 1938–1939 to be sawn at the mill in the spring.

The building of this mill operated by the power of steam consisted of two stages: the kettle was at the lower level and all the lumbering was done on the second floor. The elevator block was an endless chain, equipped with grapples. The driftwood was pulled by a steam boat from the northern end of the lake.

The businessman Jeffrey Veillet involved his children and his sons-in-law in the shareholding of forestry and commercial affairs by creating on June 5, 1943, the company "Veillette Incorporated". It was set up by Jeffrey Veillet, merchant, J.-Alexandre Moisan, accountant, Richard Veillet and Armand Plamondon, foresters, Armand-J. Veillet and Bernard St-Arneault, farmers, all from Ste-Thècle. The statutes of the new company give it a broad mission, in particular: to manufacture, buy and sell, wholesale and retail, export, import, exchange, contract and traffic in effects, foodstuffs and site goods of all kinds; Engage in timber cutting operations and businesses of all kinds, and engage in rafting, hauling and transportation of timber in all forms.

In 1945, Freddy Veillette bought the shares of his brother on the sawmill of Lake Jesuit. Freddy continued operation until his death in 1949. This sawmill was sold from 1952 to 1953 to a company that took the equipment and the buildings demolished.

== Forestry Operations in Vandry and Casey (1925-1930) ==
From 1925 to 1930, the company Veillet & Frères Limitée is committed to contracts with the Belgian logging and Consolidated Paper in the areas of: Casey (1926), Vandry (1926), Cannes (1926) and Manjobeques (1927 only).

== Forestry Operations on "La lièvre" (the Hare) river (1930-1947) ==
At the height of operations of Veillet & Frères Limitée in the area of "La lièvre" (the Hare) river, between 3000 and 3500 employed workers were assigned to the timber industries. The work of cutting wood was distributed among 45-50 forestry contractors. Following the death of Jeffrey Veillet, which occurred in 1946, Consolidated Paper has taken over directly logging. Company Veillet & Frères was dissolved in 1947.

== Forestry Operations in Talbot (1937-1940) ==
In the winter of 1937-38 Veillet & Frères Limitée has made the logging of "pitounes" in Talbot sector. It built a logging camp located at about 3 km from the railway; this camp remained inoperative for a year. Then work resumed intensely from June to August 1939 to make a cut of 25,000 cords of peeled wood. Forestry operations in Talbot (Linton area) ceased in spring 1940. A secondary railway road had been built for loading the timber cut in "pitounes" (logs of 4 feet long).

== Municipal politics ==
In municipal politics, Jeffrey Veillette was at first a board member of the municipality of the village of Sainte-Thècle, then mayor from 1919. In addition, from 1921 to 1925, he had accumulated as the office of mayor of the municipality of the parish of Sainte-Thècle.

== See also ==
- Sainte-Thècle
- Tawachiche River
- Lake Jesuit
- Lac-aux-Sables
