= Paul Le Jeune =

French Jesuit missionary (1591–1664)

The Reverend Paul Le Jeune SJ
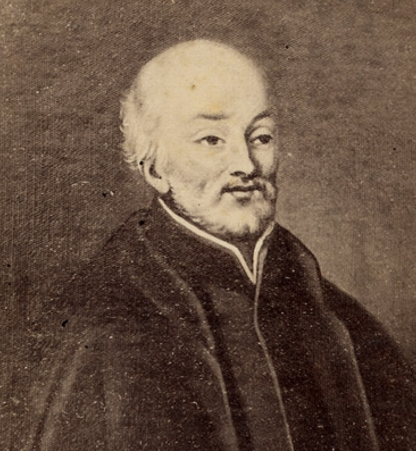
- Born: 1591; Champagne, France
- Died: 1664 (aged 72–73)
- Occupation: Jesuit missionary

Paul Le Jeune, SJ (French pronunciation: [filip lə ʒœn]; 1591–1664) was a French Jesuit missionary in New France. He served as the Superior of the Jesuits in the French colony of Canada from 1632 to 1639. During his tenure, he began a mission at Trois-Rivières, founded the community at Sillery, and saw the establishment of the Hôtel-Dieu de Québec.

== Biography ==
Le Jeune was born to a Huguenot family in Vitry-le-François in the region of Champagne, France in 1591, and converted to Roman Catholicism at the age of sixteen. Le Jeune received a thorough preparation for the Jesuit priesthood; he was a novice for two years between 1613 and 1615, and he was deeply influenced by his mentor Father Massé, whom he met at the collège Henri IV de La Flèche. During his studies, Le Jeune developed a keen interest in missions and became convinced that education was a key element in any successful attempt to spread Christianity. After finishing his philosophical studies Father Le Jeune was a teacher at the colleges in Rennes (1618–19) and Bourges (1619–22).

In 1624, Le Jeune was ordained, and in 1632 he was named superior of the Jesuit mission in Canada. He had not requested the posting to New France, but accepted without complaint and embarked from Le Havre with two companions on 18 April 1632. It was a difficult voyage and the forty-year-old Le Jeune was terribly seasick. They arrived at Tadoussac on 18 June 1632.

== New France ==
Le Jeune's first year was spent in the French settlements. Perhaps best known for his work with the Native American population, Le Jeune displayed an eagerness for learning various Native American languages. His assignment was to translate the Scriptures. Sometimes he caught them "teaching him obscene words in place of the right ones." Among his most well-documented experiences are his travels during the winter of 1633-1634 among the Montagnais. During the trip he had to contend with the teasing and occasional hostility of the shaman, Carigonan. While his work during those six months did not result in mass conversions as he had hoped, his ethnographic account of the Montagnais and his personal anecdotes about the cold, hunger, and conflicts he encountered are recorded in Relations des Jésuites de la Nouvelle-France of 1634. E.F.K. Koemer suggests that Le Jeune's identification of a distinction between animate and inanimate nouns eventually assisted John Eliot in his grammar of the Natick language.

Le Jeune decided that in order to effectively carry out his apostolate, he needed to establish mission settlements, on the model of Jesuit missionary work in San Ignacio Miní in Misiones Argentina and bordering region of Paraguay, a hospital to care for the aged and the ill, and schools for educating the young. He wrote: "I believe that souls are all made of the same stock, and that they do not materially differ; Hence, these barbarians having well formed bodies, and organs well regulated and well arranged, their minds ought to work with ease. Education and instruction alone are lacking." Le Jeune encouraged his missionaries to learn the native languages. In 1634 he sent Father Jacques Buteux to the trading post at Trois-Rivières to instruct the indigenous people who used it as a summer stopping place.

In 1635 a Jesuit college to educate French and Amerindian boys was established in Quebec, with Antoine Daniel in charge, but closed after five years. That December Le Jeune preached the sermon at Samuel de Champlain's funeral.

In a 1637 letter he cautions all missionaries not to make the "savages" wait for them when embarking in the morning, to never show distaste for any of their customs, and to help out during portages, or over-land journeys, from one river to another. That same year he laid the foundation of a house for missionaries at Sillery, named after benefactor Noël Brûlart de Sillery, who provided the funds.

Le Jeune found that devotional images helped a good deal in conveying ideas he was trying to express. Religious processions had an important civic function. Le Jeune recorded a celebration held in Quebec in 1639 honoring the birth of Louis XIV. Along with fireworks and cannon salutes, a procession was held in conjunction with the Feast of the Assumption, in which the French and more than a hundred Indians, six of them dressed in sumptuous French royal garments, processed from the hospital, to the Ursuline convent, and finally to the Jesuit church. Prayers were said in both French and the local Indian language, and when the procession ended, the Governor provided a feast for all in attendance. The procession had become a centerpiece of the fragile multicultural community. By 1639 there were less than 100 converts among the Hurons, who numbered several thousands.

Le Jeune and his contemporaries did not limit their efforts in conversions and education to Native Americans. While there were fewer slaves in the French colonies than in the English and Spanish ones, Le Jeune's interactions with African slaves in Quebec set a key precedent that would inspire later generations of priests, teachers, activists, and abolitionists. Jesuit practice viewed all people as equal before God and as having equal need for salvation. Thus, it was incumbent on the Church to provide for the intellectual and spiritual well-being of slaves. Le Jeune himself adopted a very direct approach to this issue. As early as 1634, Le Jeune expressed enthusiasm because he found himself teaching African children the alphabet, and in Volume V of The Jesuit Relations he emphasized the need for Africans to gain sufficient learning and literacy so that they could demonstrate enough of an understanding of Catholic dogma to secure the rite of baptism.

Since Jesuits consistently emphasized the role of the intellect, it is logical that they advocated education for slaves throughout the colonies. Most of the priests' work was with slave children; unlike adults, they were granted time away from their masters for basic schooling, and since so much cultural disruption had already taken place, slave parents were not generally viewed as opponents to education in the same way that Native American parents were.

In their work with the children of colonists, slaves, and Native Americans, Le Jeune and his fellow Jesuits used the same sort of materials, such as a primer or hornbook that were used throughout the North American colonies. These materials transmitted traditional European cultural and religious beliefs while they encouraged literacy. Teaching the catechism, biblical passages, and religious stories was, the Jesuits believed, the primary role of literacy in New France.

He established the chapel of Notre Dame de Recouvrance in Quebec and assigned Fathers Charles Lallemant and Anne de Nouë to it. In August 1639 Sister Marie of the Incarnation arrived in Quebec. The Ursulines established a convent in the lower town (Basse-Ville). Also on board were three Canonesses of St. Augustine of the Mercy of Jesus to establish a hospital underwritten by Marie Madeleine d'Aiguillon, niece of Cardinal Richelieu in response to a report from Le Jeune that had been published in the Relations in France.

Le Jeune remained the superior of the Jesuit mission until 1639 when he was replaced by Father Barthélemy Vimont, but he did not return to France until 1649. Upon his return, he served as the mission procurator of New France until 1662, only two years before his death.

== Long-term implications ==
The writings and experiences of Le Jeune and his fellow Jesuits are reflected in the Code Noir passed by France's King Louis XIV in 1685. This document outlined the rights of both slaves and their masters throughout the French colonies and notably advocated that slaves gain enough education that they would understand and embrace Catholicism. In fact, slave masters were required to offer access to baptism.

Le Jeune's influence was not limited to Canadian territories or seventeenth century Jesuits; when the French settled Louisiana, there was a clear sense that literacy and religion were interconnected. Even after Louisiana became part of the United States, Catholic priests and laypersons continued to advocate for slave literacy. Indeed, the lack of formal education for slaves became a key factor in the Catholic Church's later support of Abolitionism.

=== Toponyms Le Jeune ===
In recognition of the work of the missionary life Paul Le Jeune, some geographic names have been assigned to this Jesuit who came from France, and founder of the hamlet of Trois-Rivières in 1634:

- "Canton Le Jeune" (Township Le Jeune), Sainte-Thècle, Quebec. Already baptized in 1873, this Township of forest is located between the village of Saint-Joseph-de-Mékinac, Quebec and Sainte-Thècle, Quebec. This township has several lakes whose names evoke the Jesuit Paul Le Jeune: Missionary lake and the Lake Jesuit.
- Chemin du Canton-Le Jeune (Le Jeune Township road), Sainte-Thècle, Quebec.
- Domaine du Canton-Le Jeune, Sainte-Thècle, Quebec.
- "Le Jeune" lake, Sainte-Thècle, Quebec.
- Lake Jesuit, Sainte-Thècle, Quebec.
- Missionary lake.
- École polyvalente Paul Le Jeune (High School), in Saint-Tite, Quebec. This school was opened in September 1969 for secondary students in the area known as Normandy (now Mékinac area). Historical research on the passage said Mékinac-Tawachiche were made in 1968-69 by Jean-Noël Carpentier, who was General Director of the "Commission scolaire de Normandie" (headquartered in Saint-Tite) from 1969 to 1972. His historical research was based in part on the "Jesuit Relations," written by missionaries at the beginning of the French colony.

== Sources ==
- Le Code Noir ou recueil des reglements rendus jusqu'a present (Paris: Prault, 1767) [1980 reprd. by the Societé, d'Histoire de la Guadeloupe]. Translated by John Garrigus.
- Skallerup, Lee. 2006.
- Welton, Michael. (2005). "Cunning Pedagogies: The Encounter between the Jesuit Missionaries and Amerindians in 17th century New France," In Adult Education Quarterly 55. pp. 101–116.
- Woodson, C.G. (1915). The Education of the Negro Prior to 1861: A History of the Education of Colored People from the Beginning of Slavery Until the Civil War. New York: G.P. Putnam's Sons.
