= Lake Traverse (Mékinac) =

Lake in Sainte-Thècle, Quebec, Canada

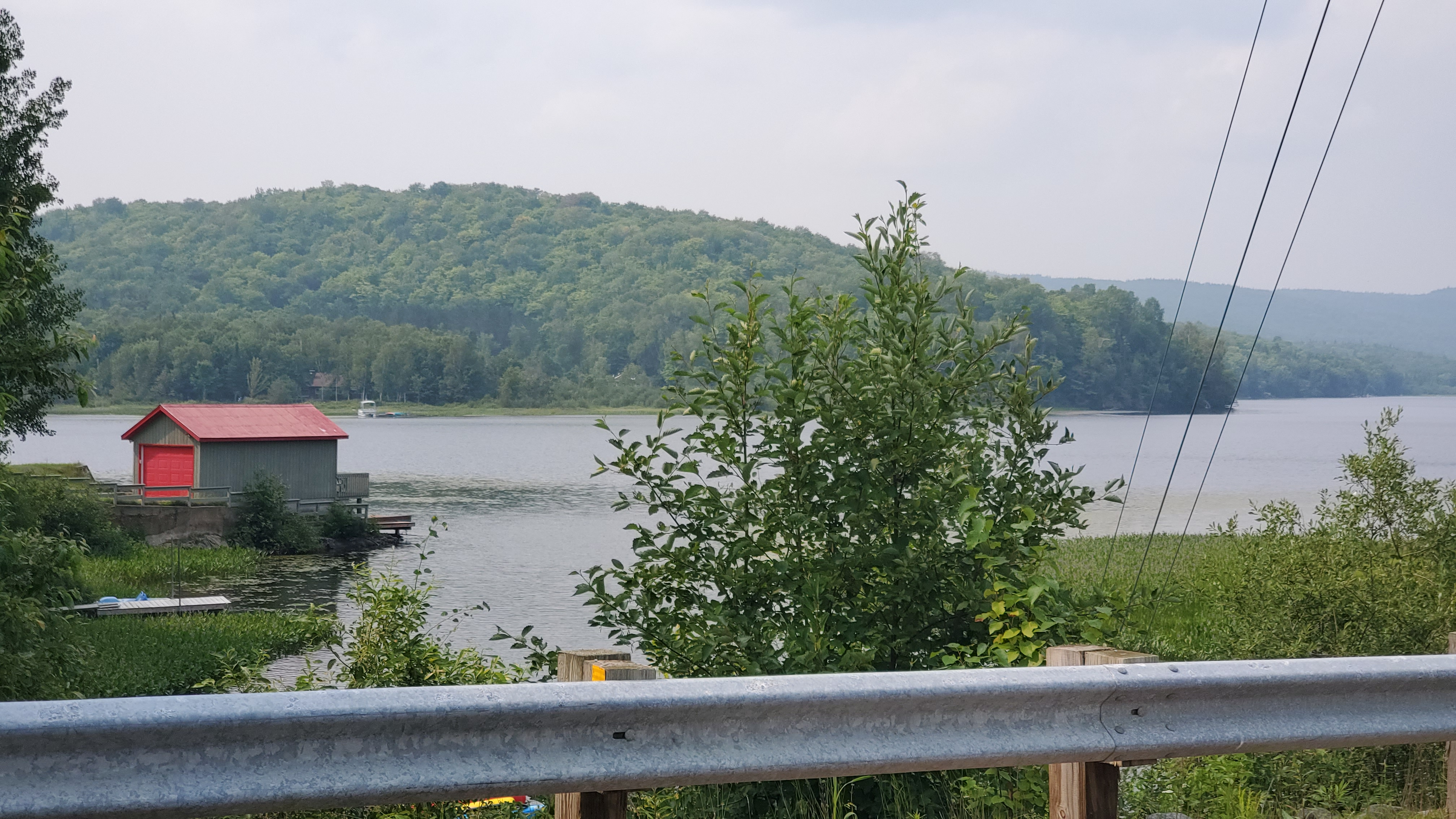
- Lac de la Traverse in Sainte-Thècle, seen from the road, near the mouth of the lake.

- Location within Quebec
- Location: Quebec
- Coordinates: 46.84806°N 72.53389°W
- Type: Natural
- Primary inflows: Outlet of Lake Jesuit
- Primary outflows: Rivière des Envies
- Catchment area: Fleuve Saint-Laurent
- Basin countries: Canada
- Max. length: 1.6 km (0.99 mi)
- Max. width: 1.2 km (1 mi)
- Surface elevation: 165 m (541 ft)
- Settlements: Sainte-Thècle

The Lake Traverse (also referred to as "Lake Travers" or "Traverse Lake") is located in the northern area of Sainte-Thècle, in the Mekinac Regional County Municipality, in the administrative region of Mauricie in the province of Quebec, Canada. Lake Traverse is part of the Batiscanie, Quebec. It is the head of Rivière des Envies which flows South into Saint-Tite.

== Geography ==
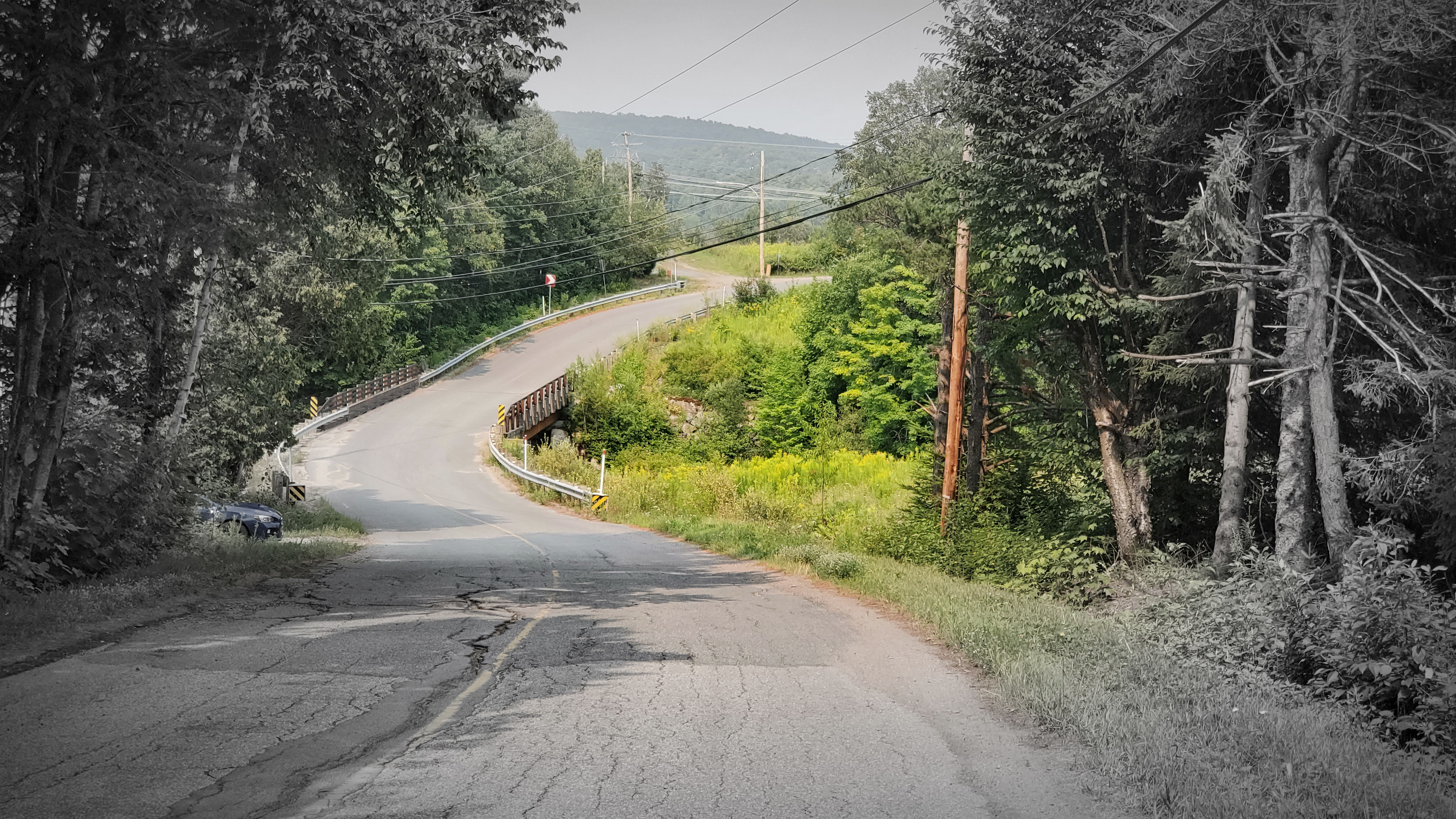
Road spanning the bridge at the mouth of Lac de la Traverse, in Sainte-Thècle. This bridge was rebuilt in 2010.

The distance between the bridge of Croche Lake (Sainte-Thècle), located in the lower village of Sainte-Thècle and the mouth of Lake Traverse is 2.9 kilometres (1.8 mi) (measured by road). From the village, the road trip is: Saint-Michel-North road, Marcotte road, St. Joseph North road, then the Lake Jesuit road. In addition, the "road of the Lake Traverse" (hence the path of Lake Jesuit road) dessert cottages on the west side of the lake.

Lake Traverse is located in the North Row B (referred to as "row of Lake Traverse" or "Row Saint-Joseph") in Sainte-Thècle, which forms the northern boundary of the Lordship of Sainte-Anne-de-la-Pérade. This lake is located at the foot of Laurentian Mountains, at the limit of St. Lawrence Valley. Thus, northern agricultural zone ends at Lake Traverse. While the northwest area of Lake Traverse is entirely a forest area and generally mountainous.

Lake Traverse has three areas, separated by peninsulas. The area to the west with a length of 1.6 kilometres (0.99 mi), contains the source and the mouth (south area), the central area of 0.9 kilometres (0.56 mi) and small area east of 0.3 kilometres (0.19 mi). While the width of the lake is 1.2 kilometres (0.75 mi) (covering 3 zones). Hydro-Québec power lines across the lake, north-east to south-west. Several cottages were built in the vicinity of the lake.

== Toponymy ==
Formerly, before the construction of "Government Road" around the lake by the west side, the "lake Traverse" was a key issue to access woodlots upstream (north), located in the Lejeune Township. Winter roads (December to March) allowed the owners of forest lots and forestry contractors to cross the lake on the ice with their cars drawn by horses. In the Spring, boats (or rafts driven by "cageux") allowed the workers to cross the lake, from the sawmill sector. The floating wood tronc on the lake supplied the sawmill at the mouth. A boat pulled the wood on the lake with a "baune" (floating cable) to bring stranded, downstream from the bridge of the landfill. The name "Lake Traverse" was formalized on December 5, 1968, in the Bank of place names in Commission de toponymie du Québec (Geographical Names Board of Québec)

=== History ===
In 1882, the Government of Quebec began the construction of the road of Row B North (called row of Lake St. Joseph or row of Lake Traverse) in Sainte-Thècle, along the road of row St-Georges. These two new routes gave a new impetus to the colonization.

Historically, the topography of the valley of the discharge of Lake Jesuit and around Lake Traverse allowed access to Lejeune Township, located in the northwestern territory of Sainte-Thècle. However, the trip was difficult because of several rocky headland which were finally dynamited gradually in the 1960s and 1970s.

Sawmill Saint-Amand

At the mouth of Lake Traverse, Alfred Saint-Amand (married to Julie Gregory) operated a sawmill from 1902 to 1932, powered by water. This mill was continued by his son Adélard Saint-Amand, and then by his grandson, son Rolland Saint-Amand In addition, Frank Blais operated a sawmill at Lake Travers.

Bridge at the mouth

The first public bridge over the rivière des Envies at the end of 19th Century, at the mouth of Lake Traverse is the so-called "chemin du gouvernement" (government road). This public bridge was located close (upstream) of the sawmill of Alfred Saint-Amand. The first wooden bridge of the municipality of the parish at the mouth of Lake Traverse was built around 1933, for only one lane. The bridge was rebuilt in 1950 for two lanes. While the private mill bridge (originally built of wood in 1912 and rebuilt approximately every ten years) was located downstream of the mill. This bridge was replaced in 1958 by a much stronger bridge.

Sugar shacks

The Lake Traverse saw many sugar shacks. Louis Bédard operated a sugar shack in around 1900 on the other side of the lake. Arthur Perron continued to operate the cabin on a lot later owned by Rolland Cossette. Samuel Bédard also had a cabin on a lot sold to Joseph Plamondon. Finally Réjean Bédard owned this lot. Alfred Huot taped maples on a lot that he sold to Odinat Huot; this lot was subsequently acquired by Rolland Béland. George Bacon also operated a sugar shack in this area, a lot was later acquired by Leandre Trudel. Other operators of sugarhouse were "Pit" Grenier, and Louis Toupin, and was later acquired by Lucien Toupin.

== See also ==
- Rivière des Envies
- Batiscanie, Quebec
- Batiscan River
- Lake Jesuit
- Sainte-Thècle
- Mekinac Regional County Municipality
- Lejeune Township
