= Lac Le Jeune =

Lake in British Columbia, Canada

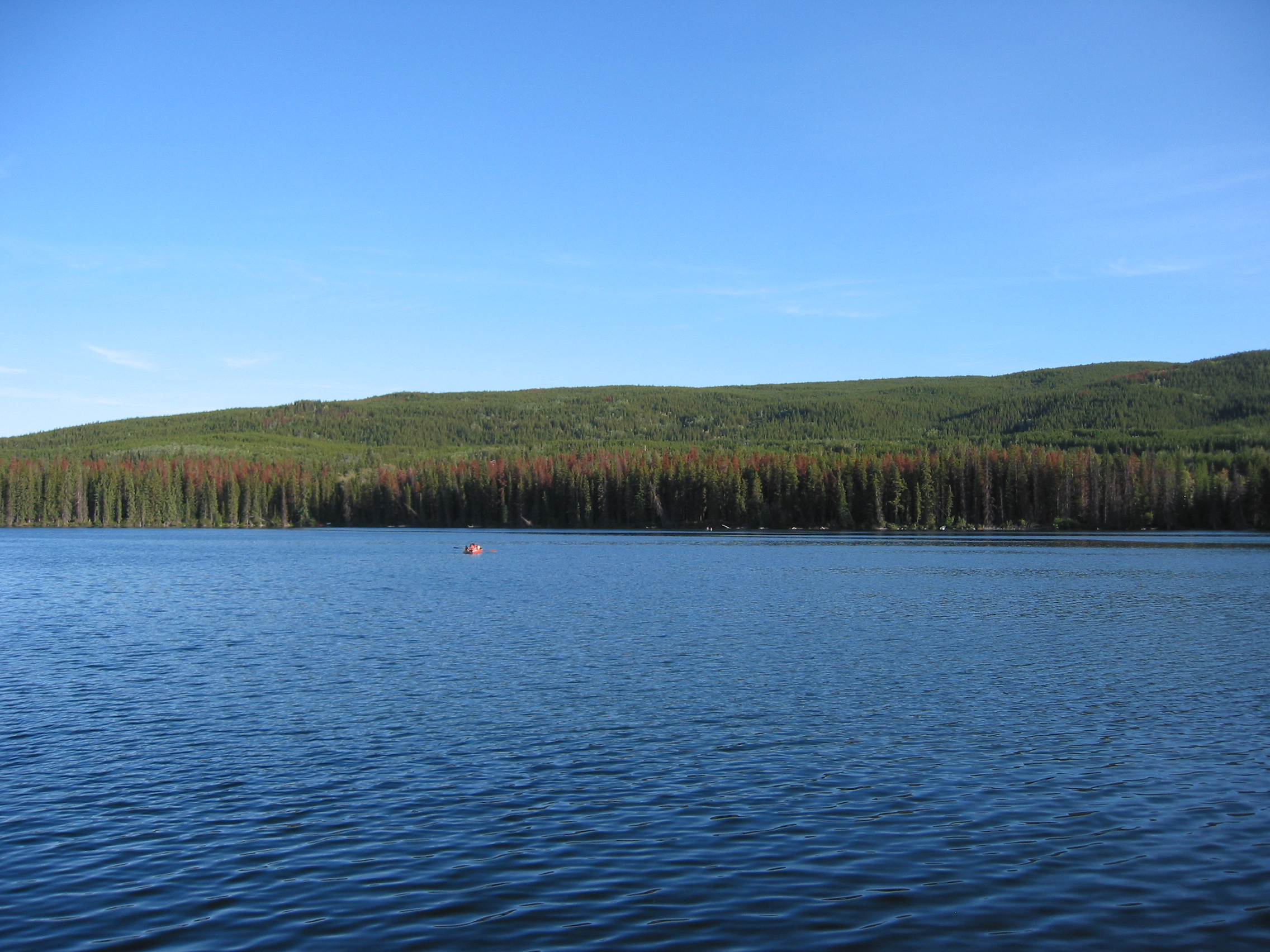

- Location within British Columbia
- Location: British Columbia
- Coordinates: 50.483°N 120.477°W
- Basin countries: Canada
- Islands: 0

Lac Le Jeune is a lake and provincial park in British Columbia, Canada, located approximately 37 kilometres south of Kamloops and 47 kilometres north of Merritt.

The lake is located within Lac Le Jeune Provincial Park, a 213-hectare provincial park run by the British Columbia Ministry of the Environment, and is a popular fishing spot for "fighting" Rainbow Trout, which was established in 1956. It is a summer holiday spot with 144 campgrounds and two resorts; the Lac Le Jeune Wilderness Resort and the Lac Le Jeune Resort.

The lake has had several names including "Batchelor", "Chuhwels", and "Le Jeune Lake". The current name was adopted in 1956, and commemorates Father Jean-Marie-Raphaël Le Jeune, a French Catholic priest who spent much of his life in the region.

== See also ==
- List of lakes of British Columbia
