= Rivière des Envies =

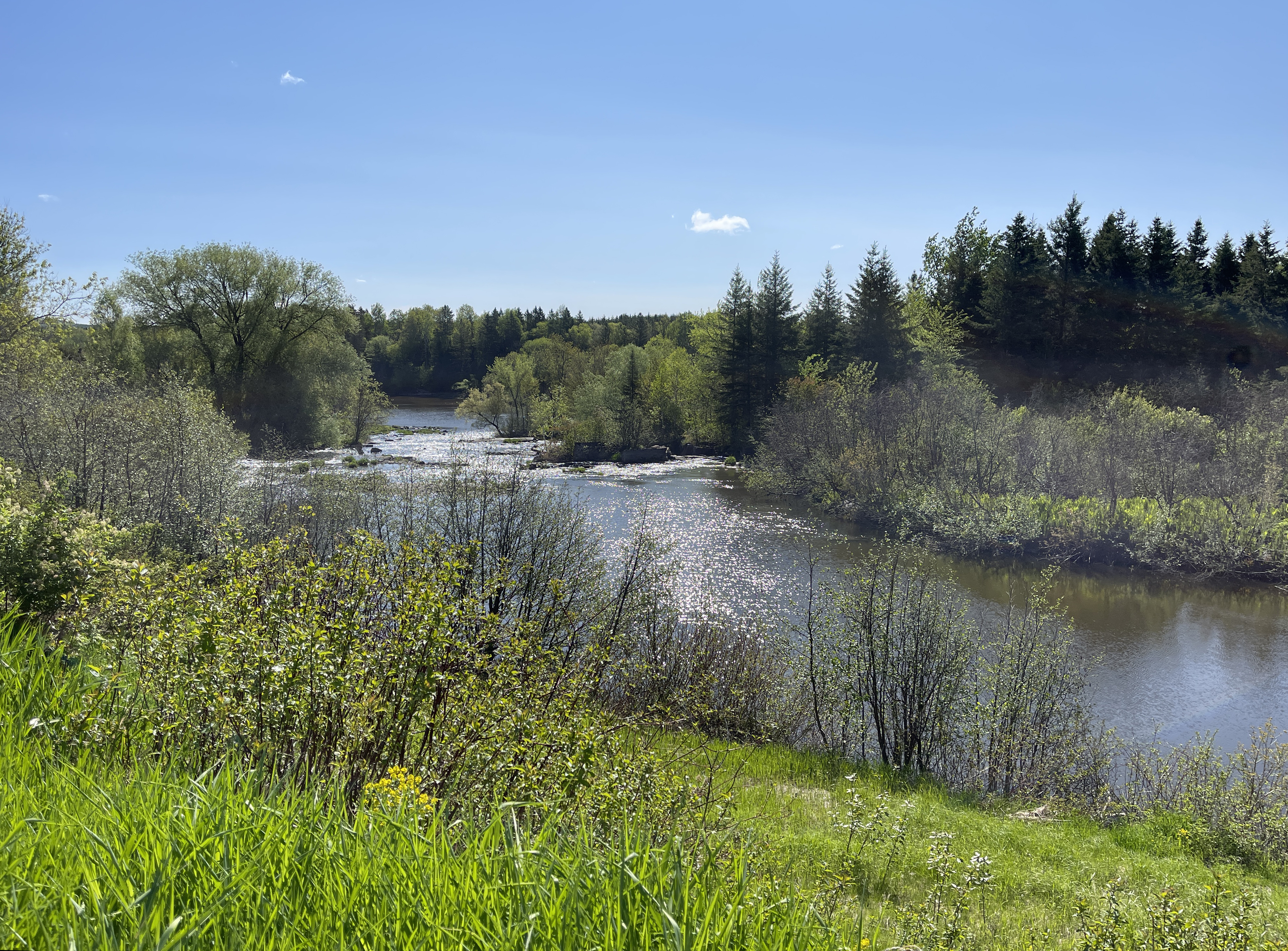
- Chemin des Moulins,Saint-Séverin

Location
- Country: Canada
- State: Québec
- Regional County Municipality: Mékinac Regional County Municipality
- Municipalities: Saint-Stanislas (Les Chenaux), Saint-Séverin, Saint-Tite, Sainte-Thècle

Physical characteristics
- Source: Discharge of Lake Traverse
  - location: Sainte-Thècle, Mauricie, Province of Québec, Canada
  - coordinates: 46°50′53″N 72°32′02″W
  - elevation: 165 m (541 ft)
- Mouth: Saint-Stanislas (Les Chenaux)
  - location: Quebec, Batiscanie, Canada
  - coordinates: 46°50′53″N 72°24′00″W
  - elevation: 100 m (330 ft)
- Length: 74 km (46 mi)
- Basin size: 482 km^{2} (186 sq mi)
- Discharge
  - location: Saint-Stanislas (Les Chenaux)
- Discharge
  - location: Saint-Stanislas (Les Chenaux)

Basin features
- Tributaries
  - left: Discharge of lakes aux chicots and Croche (Sainte-Thècle), "Le Bourdais" River, Creek "Des Fous"
  - right: Little Mékinac North River (French: "Rivière Petite Mékinac du Nord"), Rivière à la tortue (Turtle River)

Rivière des Envies in Batiscanie, in Quebec

Rivière des Envies (French pronunciation: [ʁivjɛʁ dez‿ɑ̃vi], lit. 'River of cravings') is located in Canada, in the province of Quebec, in the Mauricie administrative region, in the Batiscanie. The length of Rivière des Envies is 74 kilometres (46 mi) from the outlet of Lac-de-la-Traverse, located in row St-Joseph, Sainte-Thècle. This lake is fed by the outlet of Lake Aylwin, which in turn is fed by the outlet of Lake Jesuit (and lakes of surrounding mountains).

The watershed of the Rivière des Envies is 482 square kilometres (186 mi^{2}), i.e. the second largest watershed of Batiscanie. The basin is shared by three regional county municipalities:

• MRC of Mékinac (for Sainte-Thècle, Saint-Tite, Hérouxville and Saint-Séverin),

• MRC of Shawinigan (for Lac-à-la-Tortue),

• MRC des Chenaux (for Saint-Stanislas (Les Chenaux)).

Although the territory of the municipality of Saint-Adelphe is in the center of the arc formed by the course of the "River des Envies", this place is excluded from this watershed but a little area at the south-west—at the boundary with Saint-Stanislas (Les Chenaux).

== Toponymy ==
The first known mention of the name "Rivière des Envies" (Cravings River) is a document written in 1757 by the Jesuit brother Jean-Joseph Casot (1728-1880), even before the first settlers arrived at the sector of Rivière-des-Envies in Saint-Stanislas. Jean-Joseph Casot (born in Belgium in 1728) came from France in 1757 and was ordained a priest in 1766. In 1760, eleven families of pioneers are reported back stronghold of the manor of Batiscan, either on the sector "Rivière-des-Envies" in the territory of Saint-Stanislas. In 1776, Father Guay was on a mission in Settlers Township Saint-Stanislas-de-Koska-de-la-Rivière des Envies.

In 1781, the Jesuits control the construction of a flour mill at the mouth of "Rivière des Envies". Although the civil registers were opened in 1787, the parish was canonically erected in 1833 under the name Saint-Stanislas-de-la-Rivière des Envies. The "School Corporation of Saint-Stanislas Rivière des Envies" was incorporated under the 1845 Act (8, Victoria, BC 40-18).

The toponym "Rivière des Envies" appeared regularly in correspondence and legal acts of the Lordship of Batiscan since the implementation of the British regime. The term "Rivière des Envies" remained similar over its entire history. Several interpretations of the origin of the name have been set by various sources, but not supported by corroborating evidence. The designation "Rivière des Envies" was formalized December 5, 1968, at the "Commission de toponymie du Québec" (Geographical Names Board of Quebec).

== Course ==
The water of the river flows through municipalities of Sainte-Thècle, Saint-Tite, the boundary east of Hérouxville (about 4 km, along Row South, between the road Paquin and the road Lefebvre), Saint-Séverin and Saint-Stanislas (Les Chenaux). The river empties in Batiscan River at the southern edge of the village of Saint-Stanislas (Les Chenaux). The course of the river is especially cravings in agriculture. The river runs through a forest especially between Sainte-Thècle and Saint-Tite; downstream from Saint-Tite, the river passes through a few small areas of forest. The river also passes through the villages of Saint-Tite, Saint-Séverin and Saint-Stanislas (Les Chenaux).

Spring floods generate significant flooding upstream of the railway bridge in the village of Saint-Tite. From the intersection of the road Marchand and road St-Joseph in Sainte-Thècle, up to the village of Saint-Tite, through the area of the large marshes (Grands marais, in French), Rivière des Envies is taking a very winding course. This area was conducive for beavers and moose that probably attracted aboriginals in prehistory.

== Photos ==
Rivière des Envies

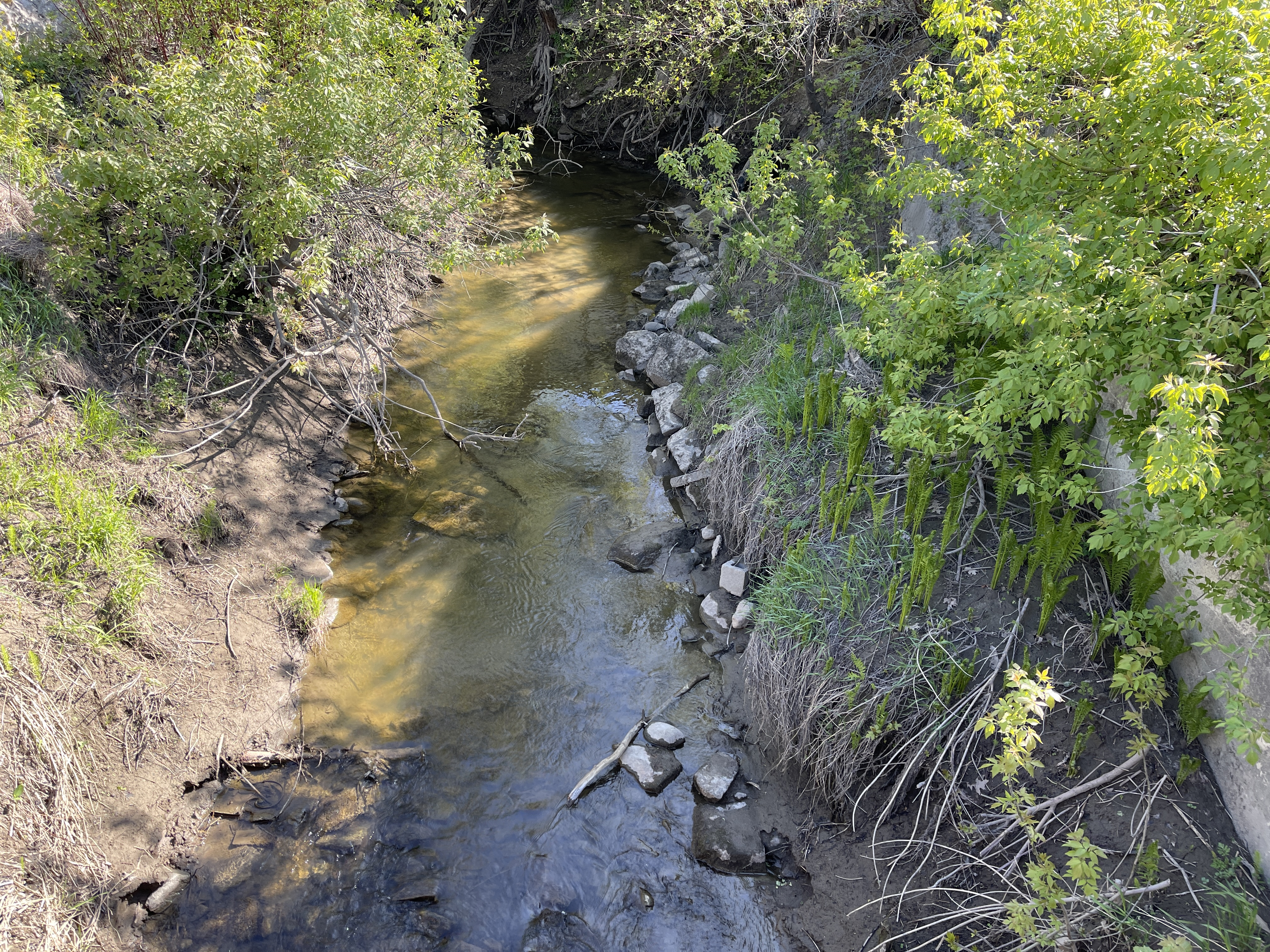
Le Bourdais River, tributary, Saint-Tite

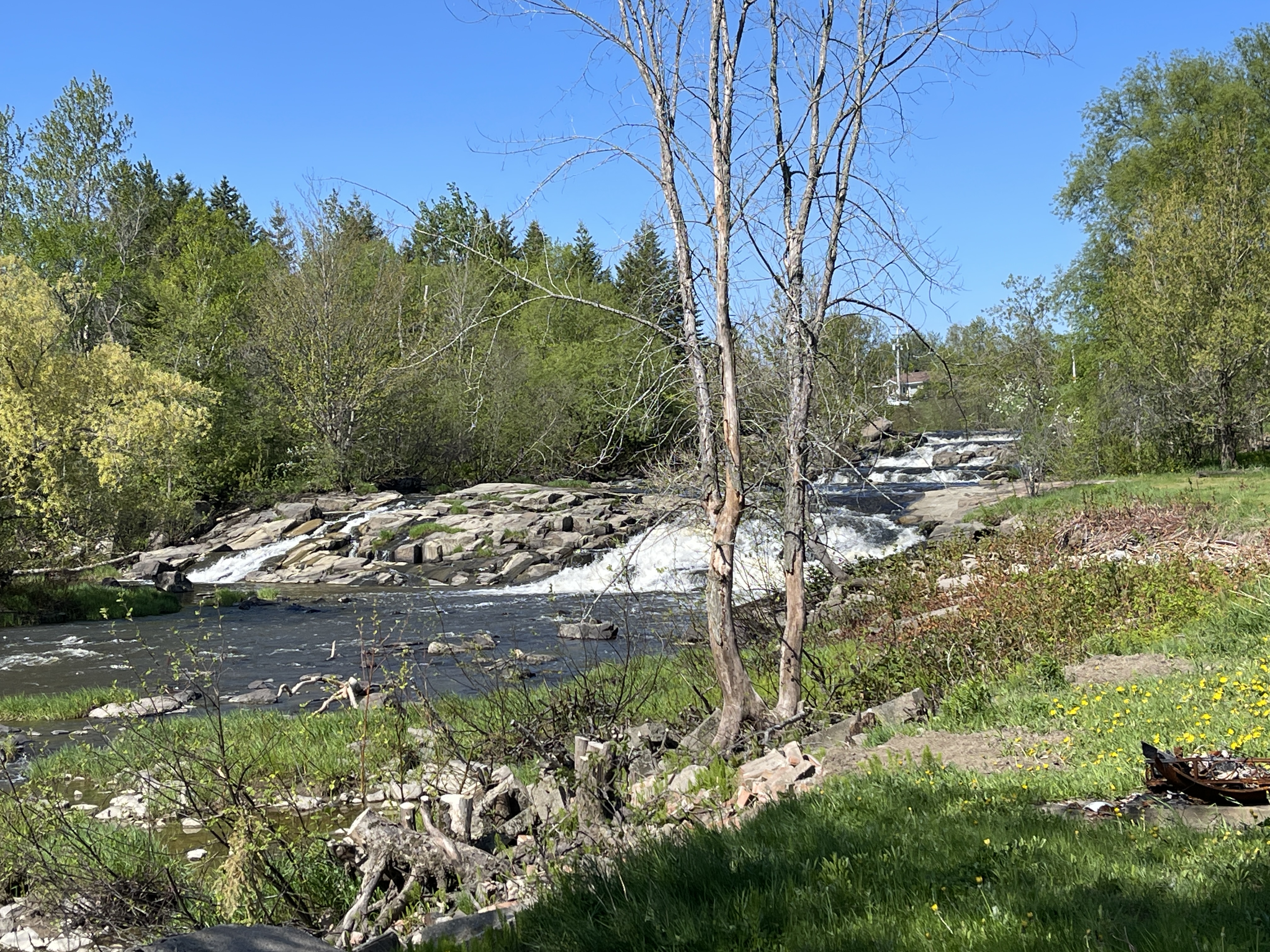
Chemin des Moulins, Saint-Séverin

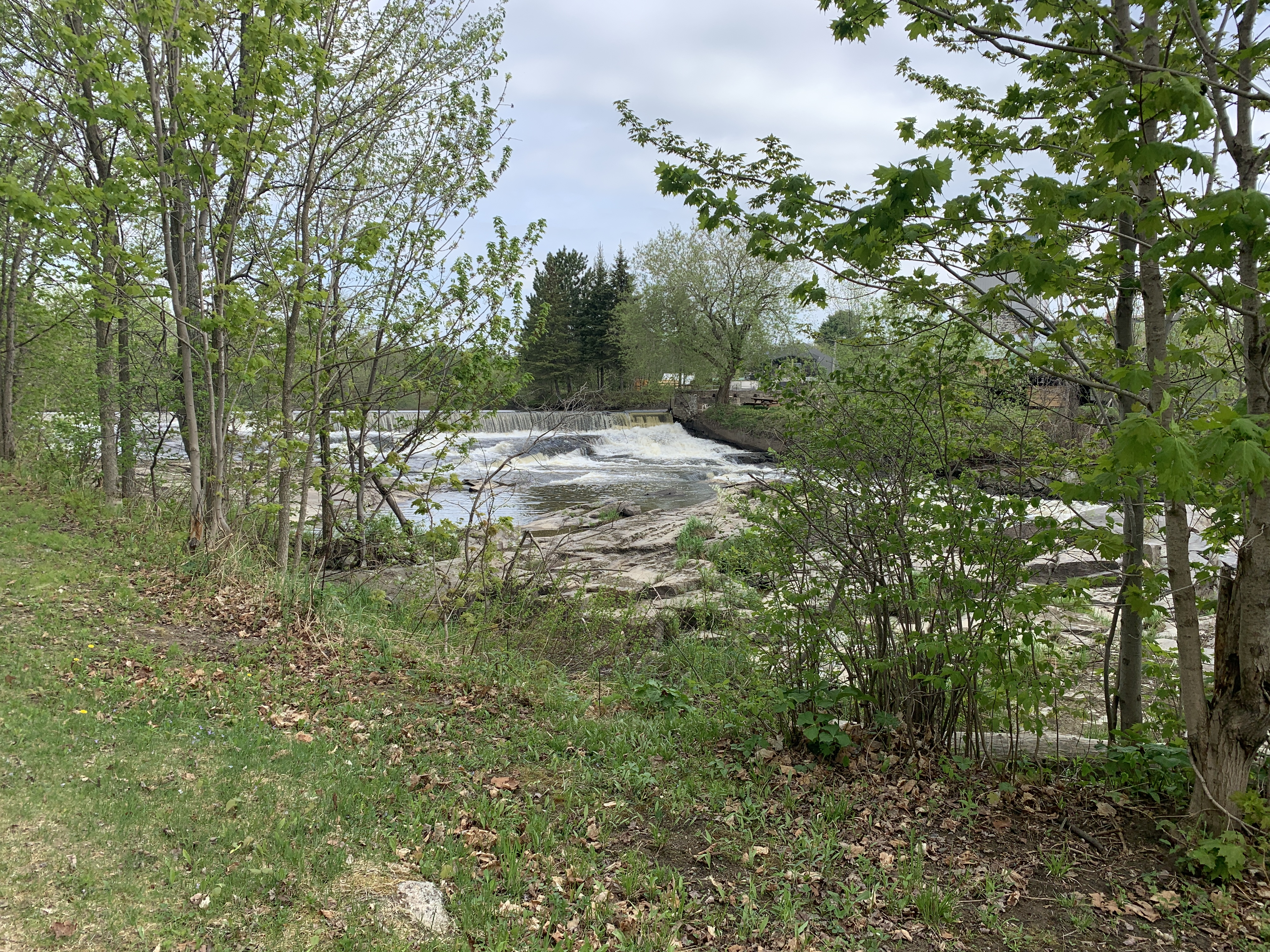
Chutes à Goulet, Saint-Stanislas

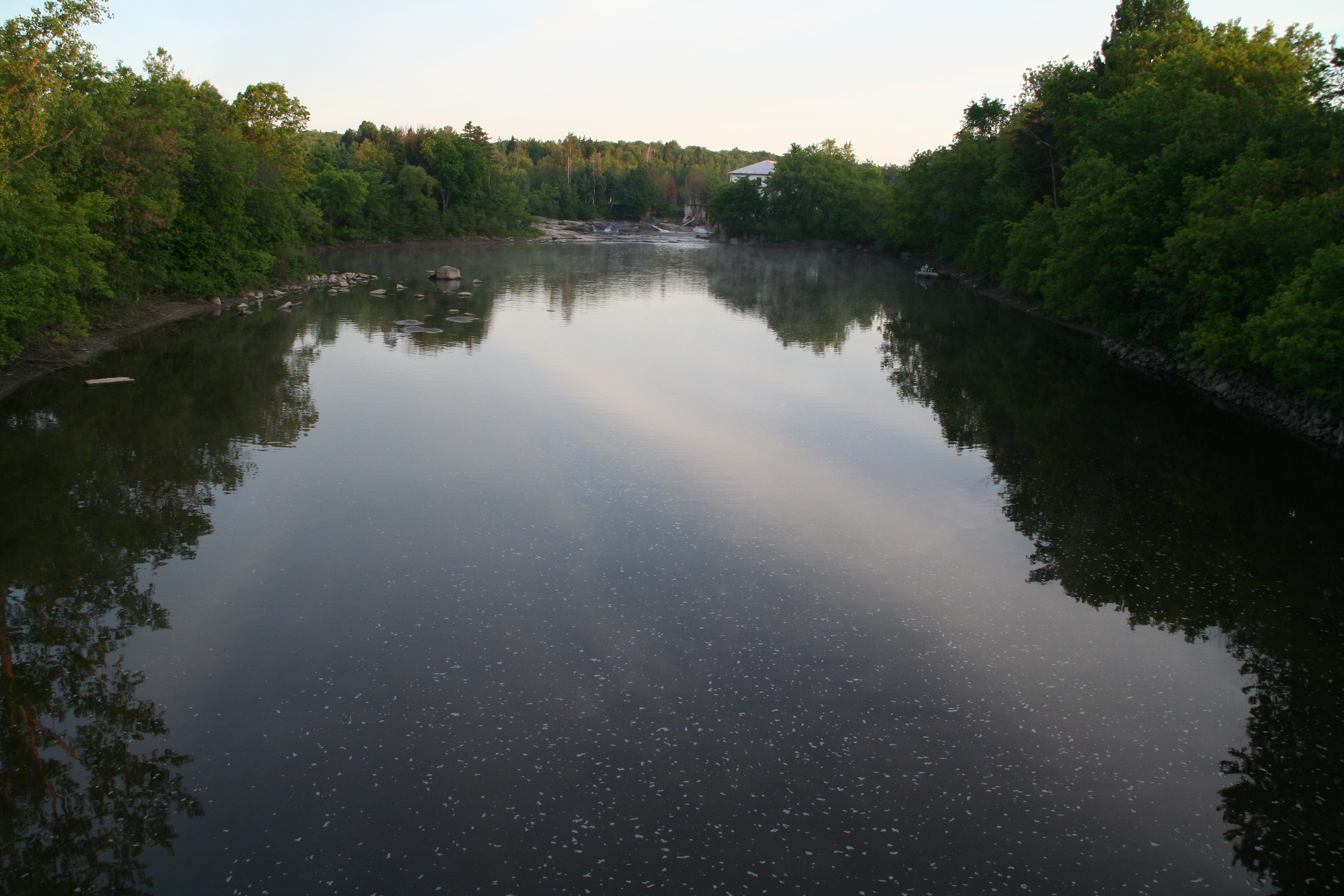
Chutes à Cossette, Saint-Stanislas

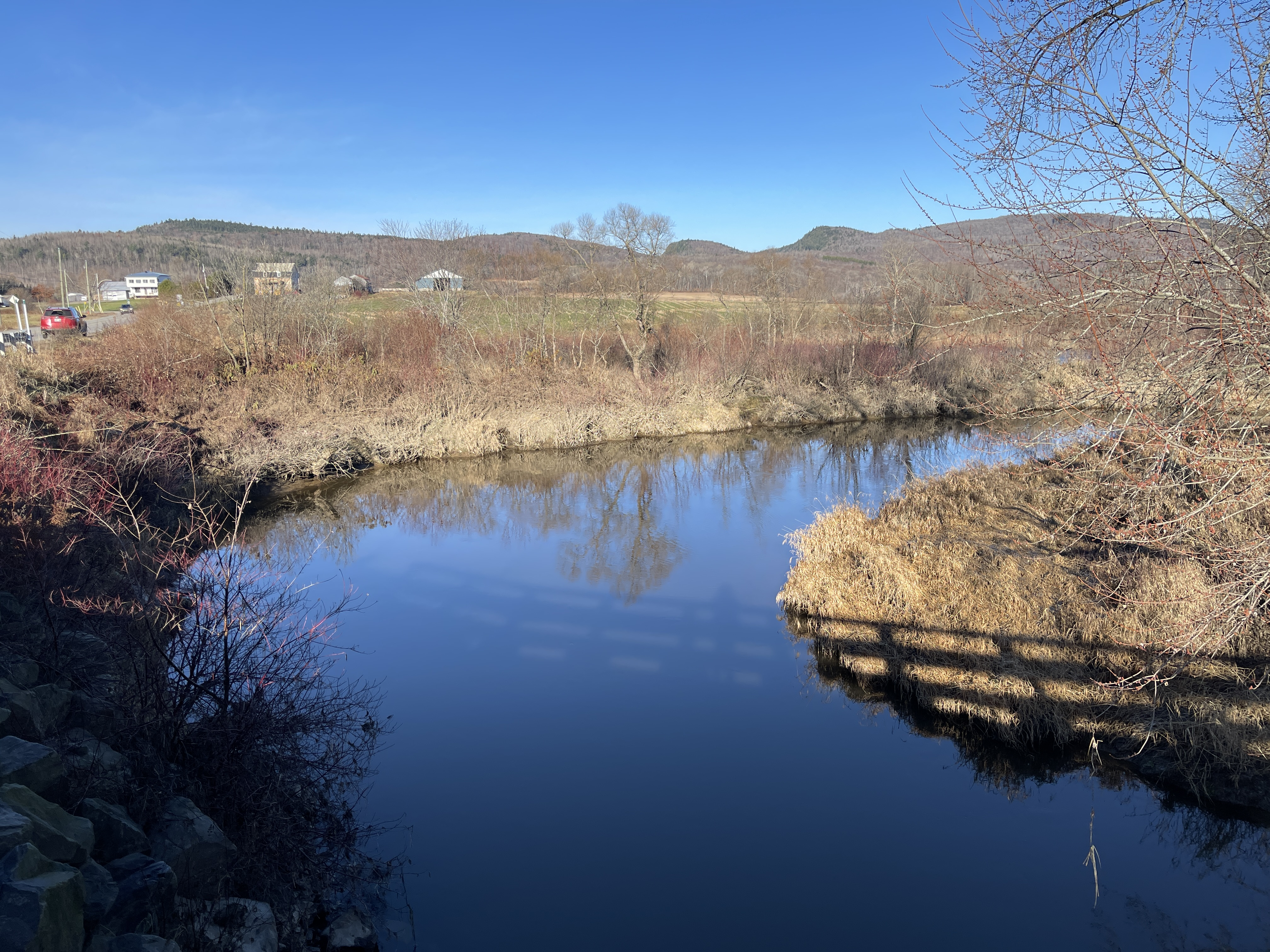
From bridge P-03960, acier-bois (1918), rang du Haut-du-Lac Nord, Saint-Tite

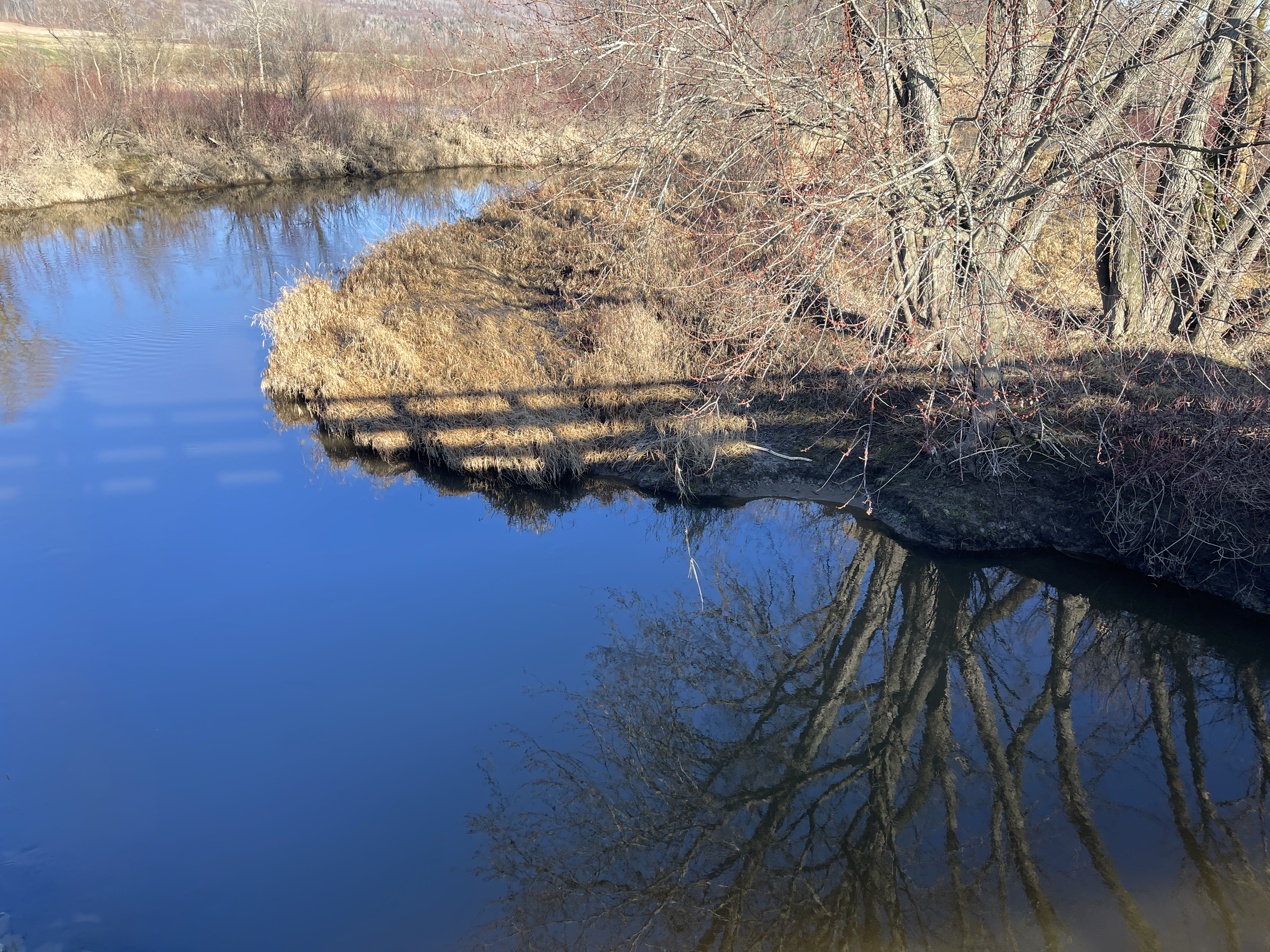
From bridge P-03960, acier-bois (1918), rang du Haut-du-Lac Nord, Saint-Tite

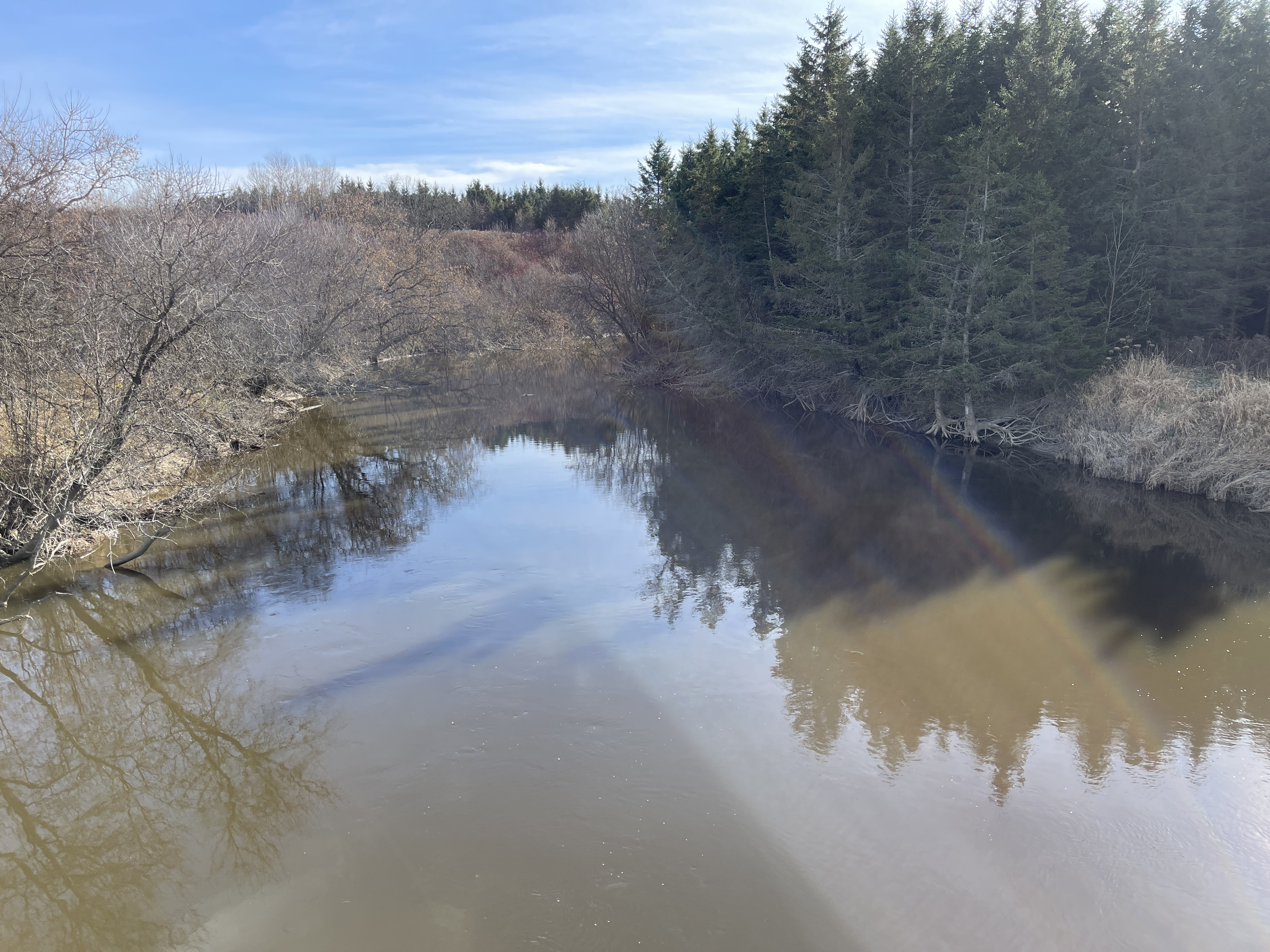
From Pont Veillette, reinforced concrete beams (1943), P-01599, route du Pont Veillette, Saint-Séverin

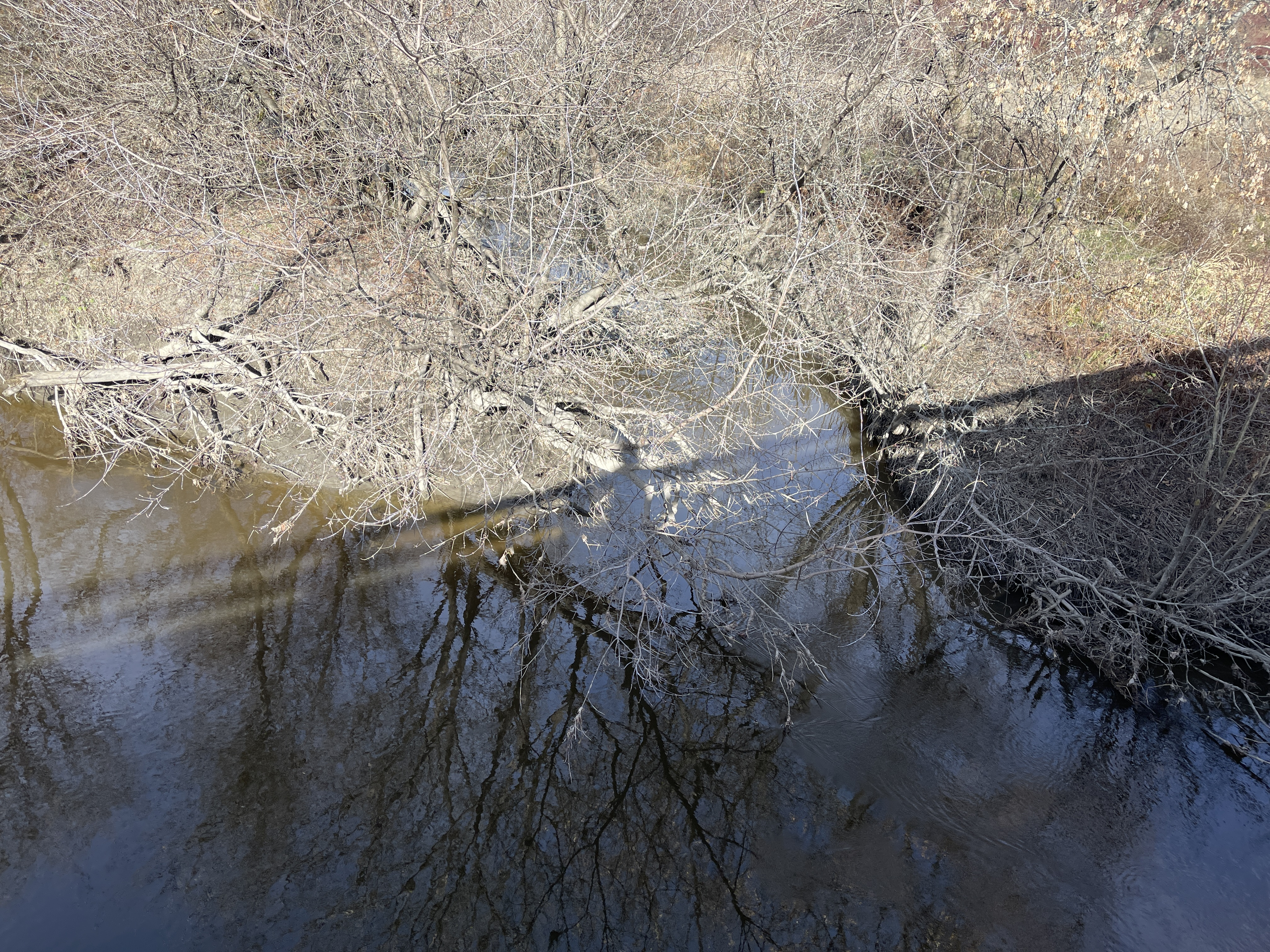
From Pont Veillette, reinforced concrete beams (1943), P-01599, route du Pont Veillette, Saint-Séverin

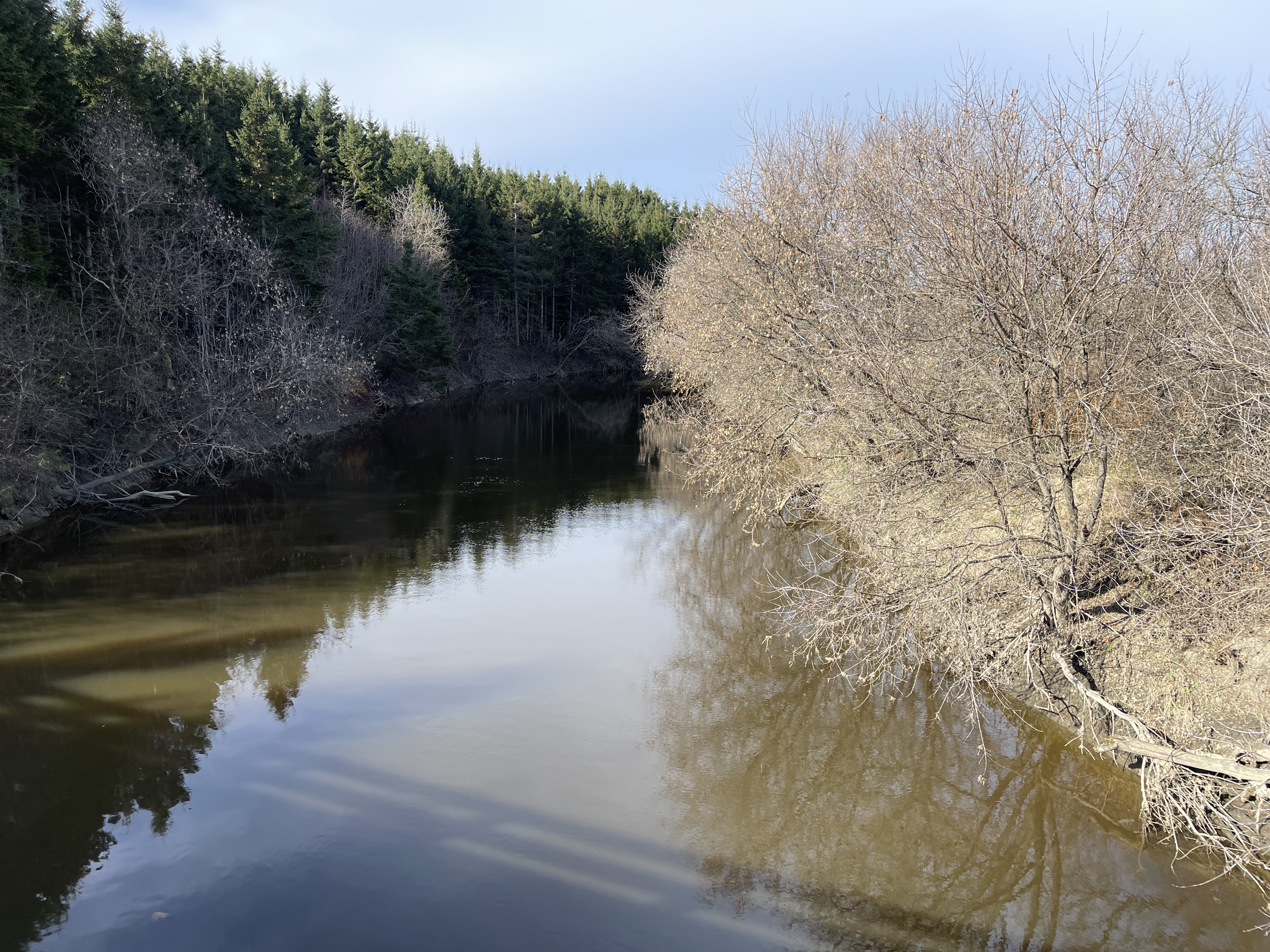
From Pont Veillette, reinforced concrete beams (1943), P-01599, route du Pont Veillette, Saint-Séverin

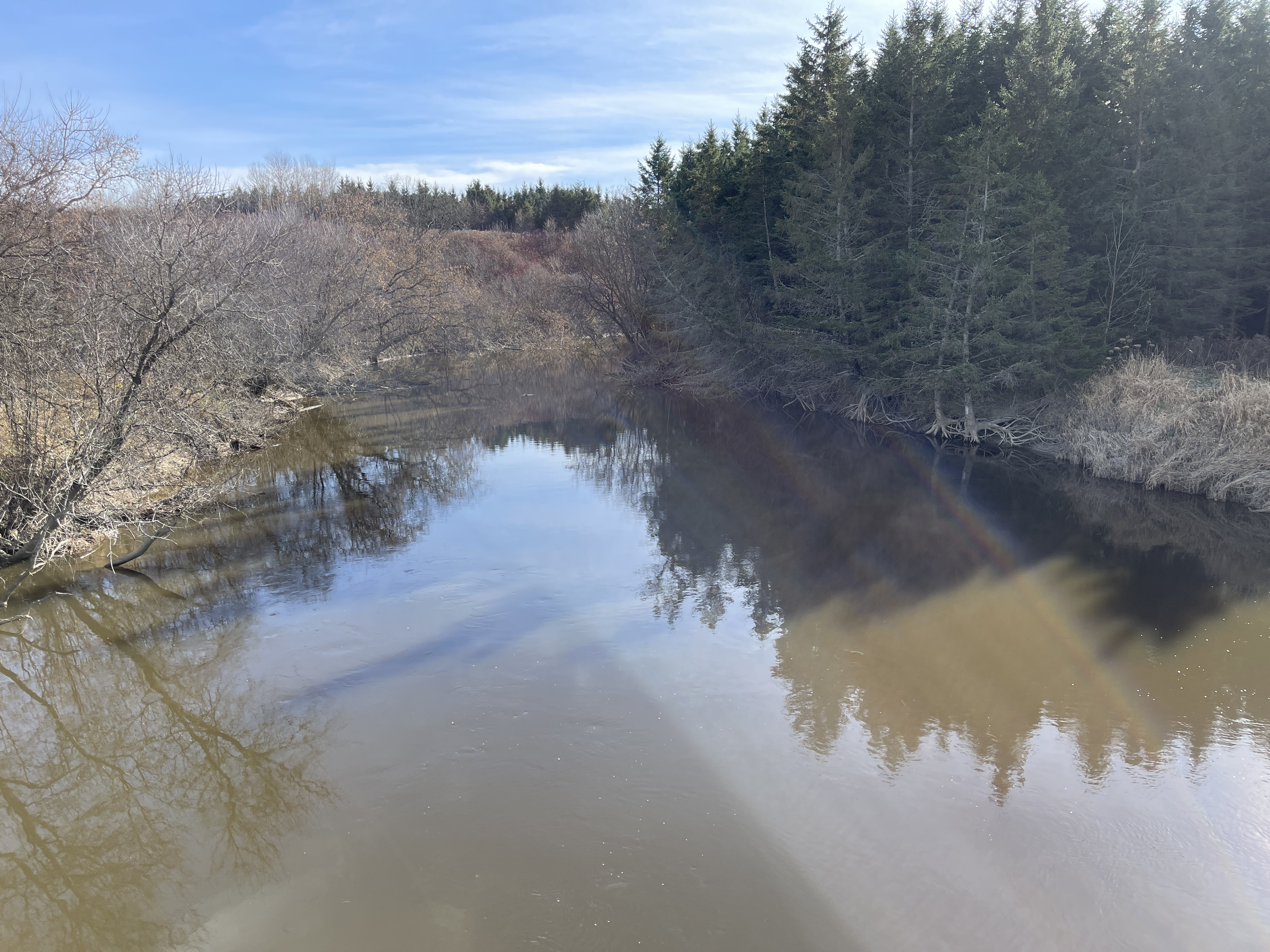
From Pont Veillette, reinforced concrete beams (1943), P-01599, route du Pont Veillette, Saint-Séverin
Bridges over the River of Envies

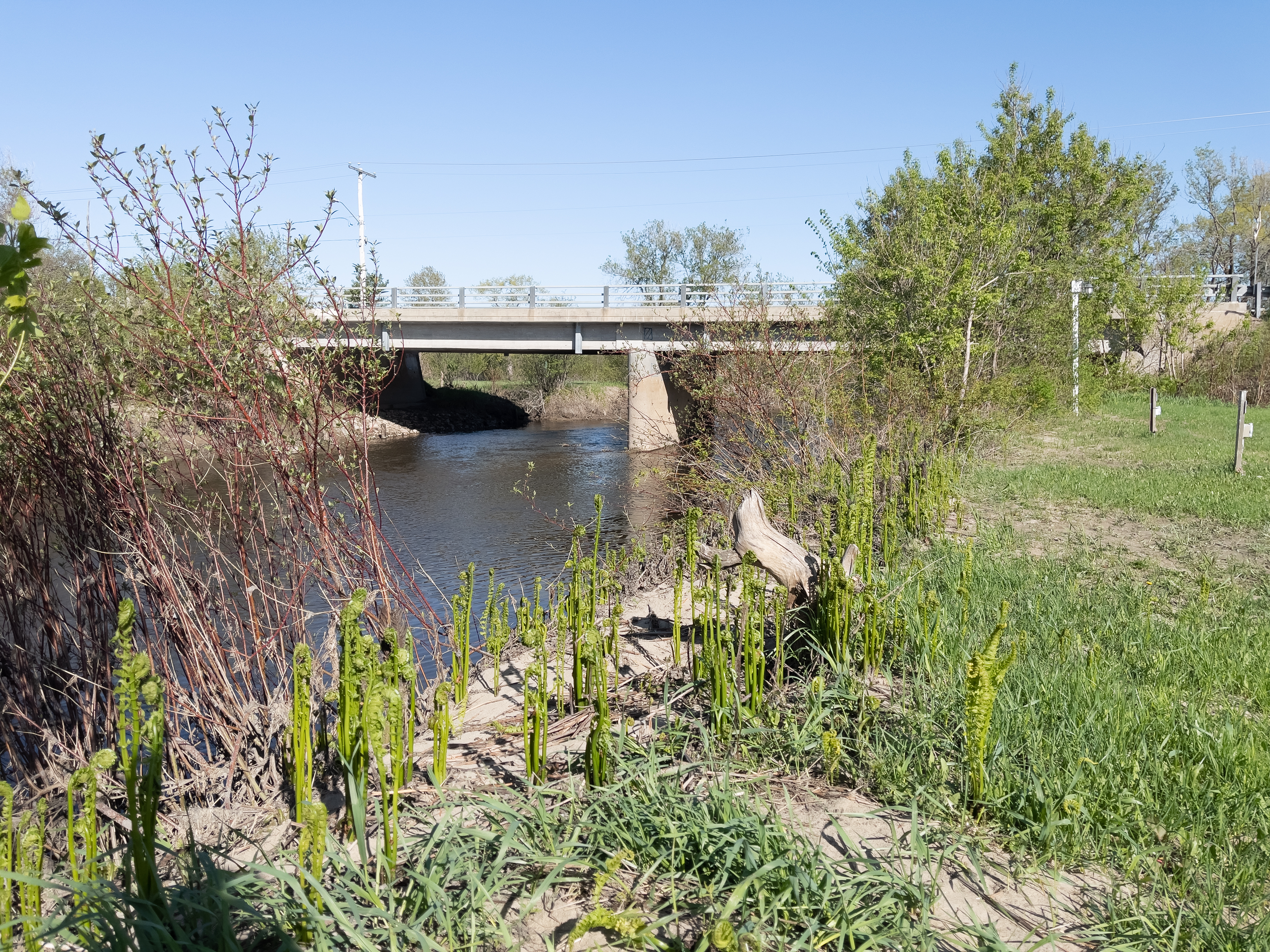
Bridge (Route 153), Saint-Tite

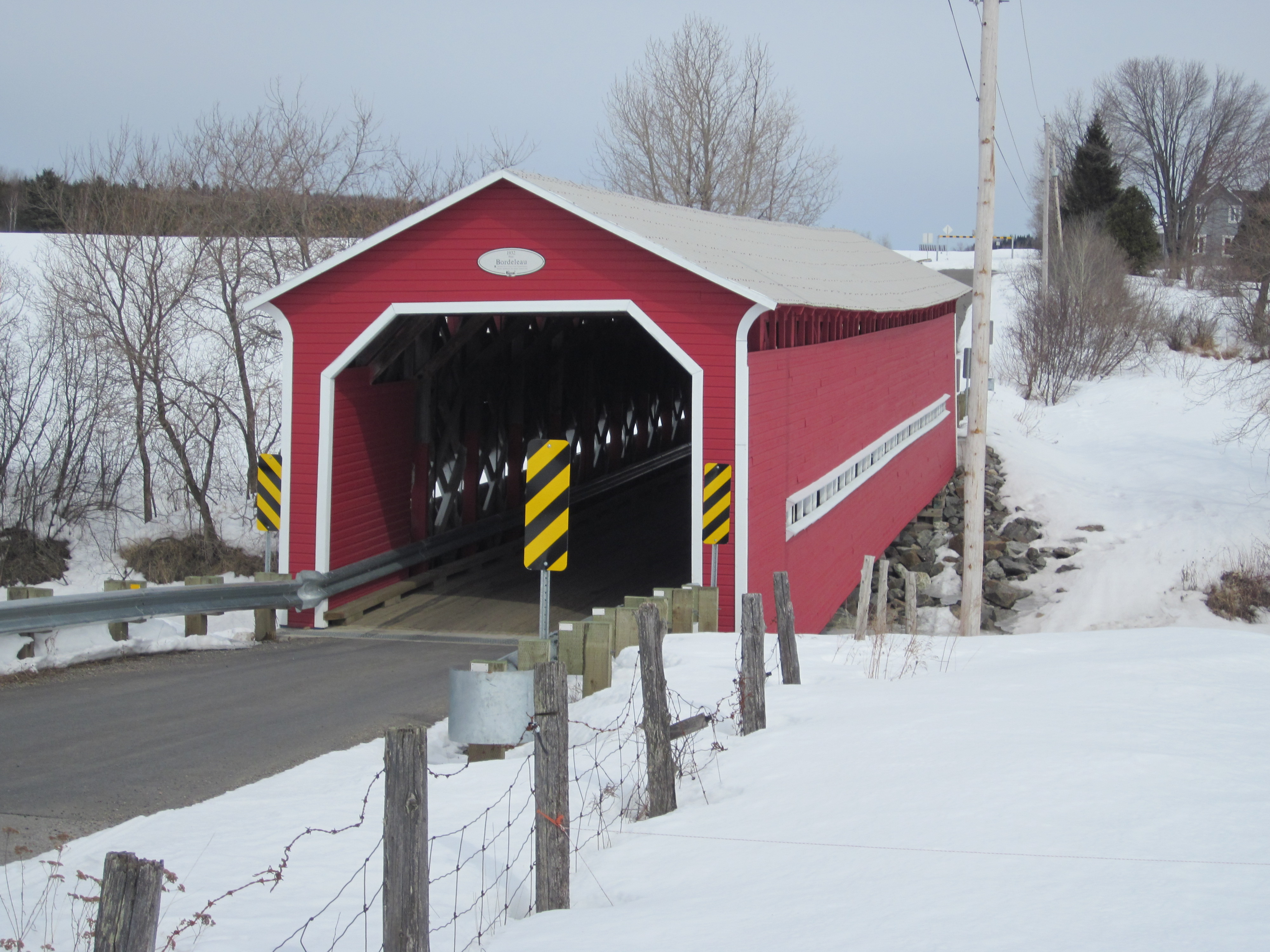
Bordeleau covered bridge, Saint-Séverin

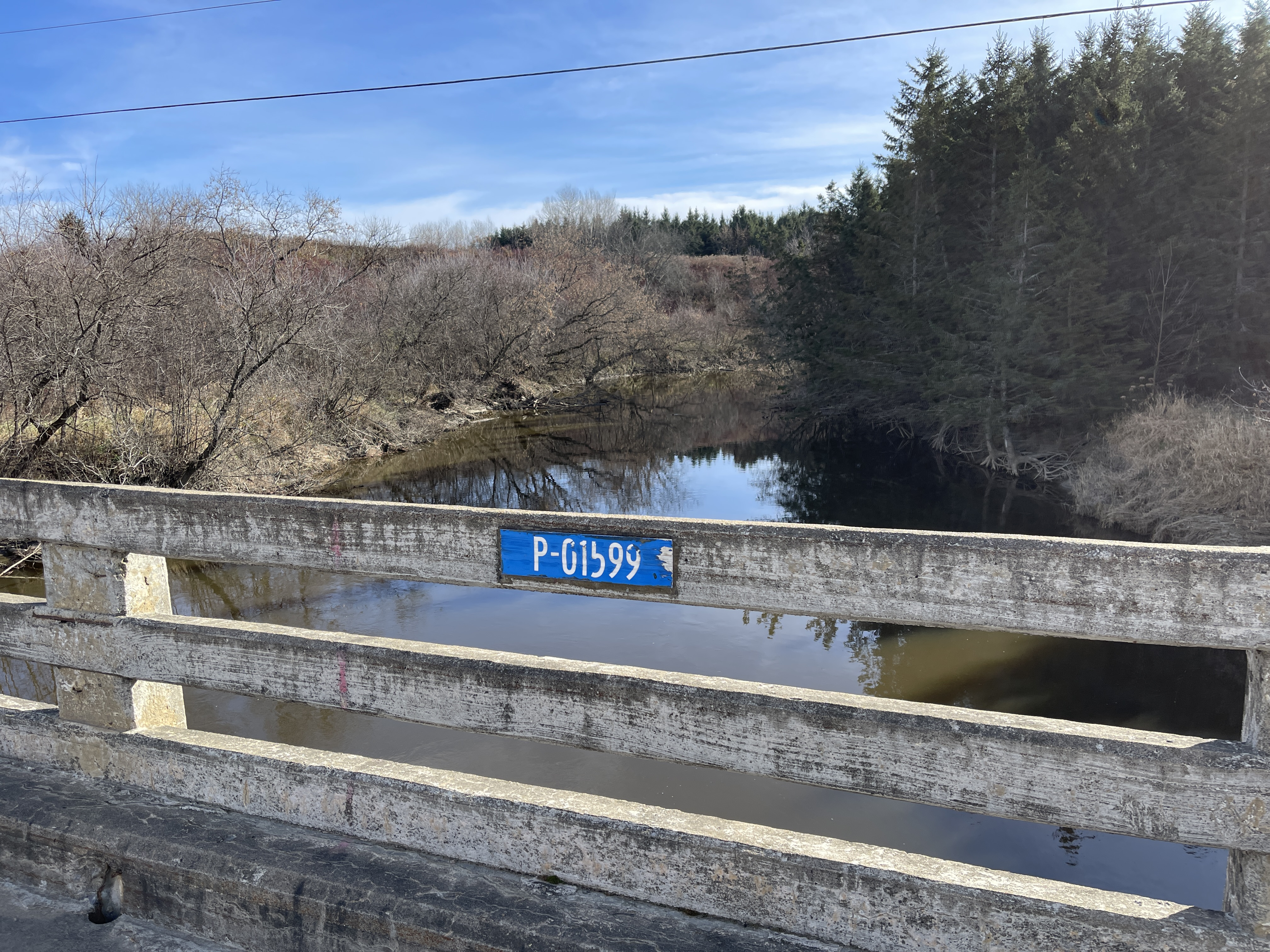
Sign on Pont Veillette, reinforced concrete beams (1943), P-01599, route du Pont Veillette

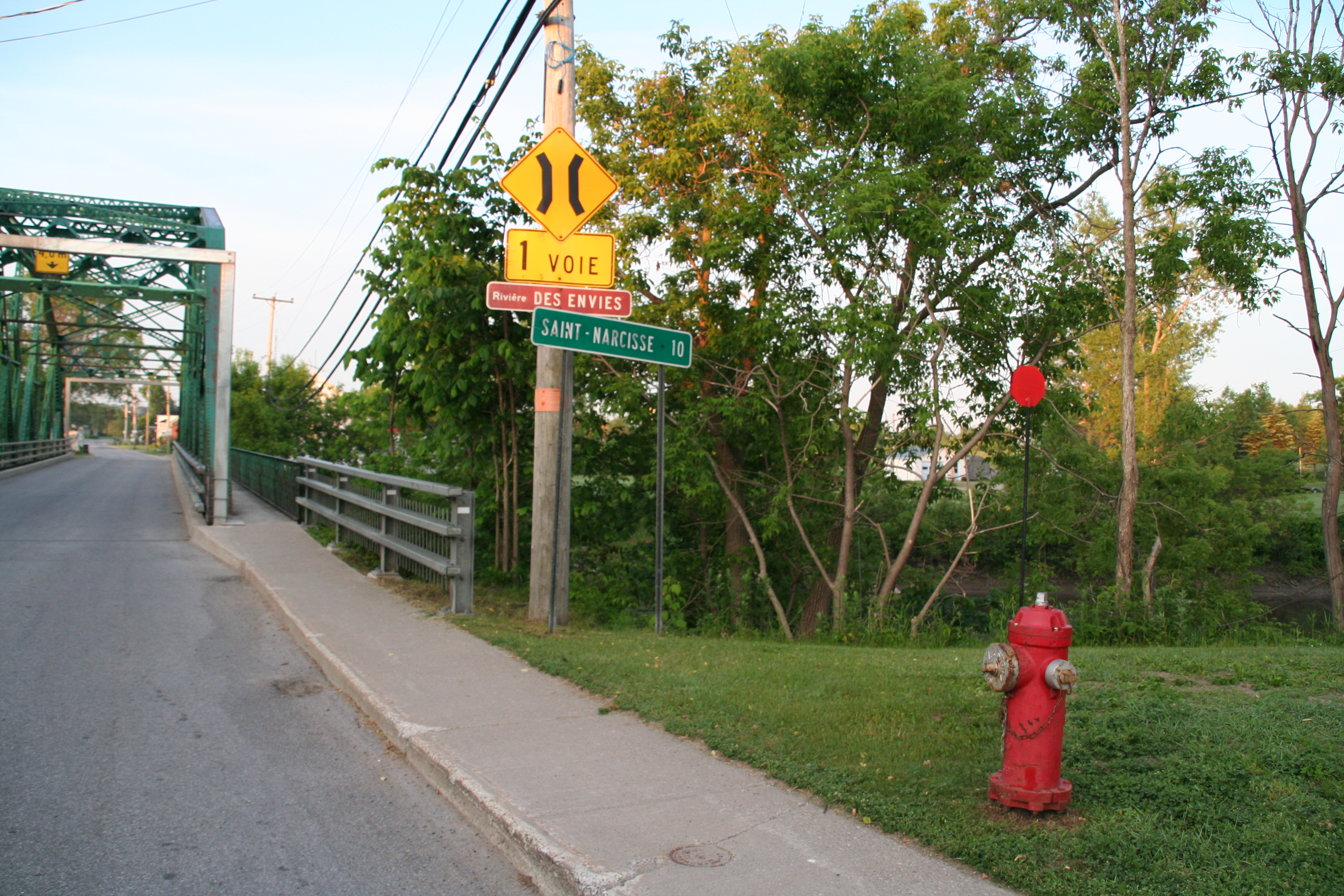
Road signs, (route 352), Saint-Stanislas

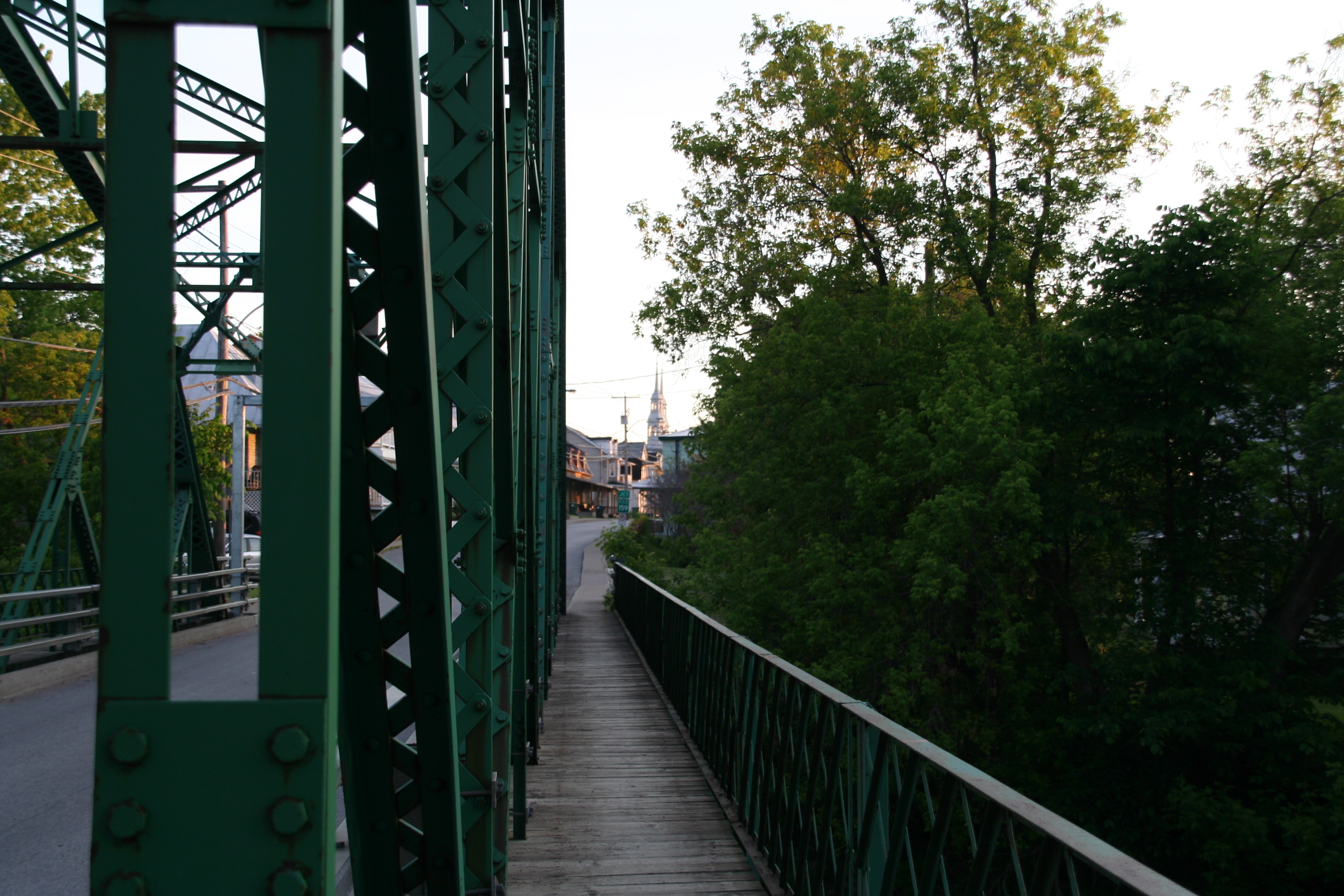
Bridge, rue Principale (route 352), Saint-Stanislas

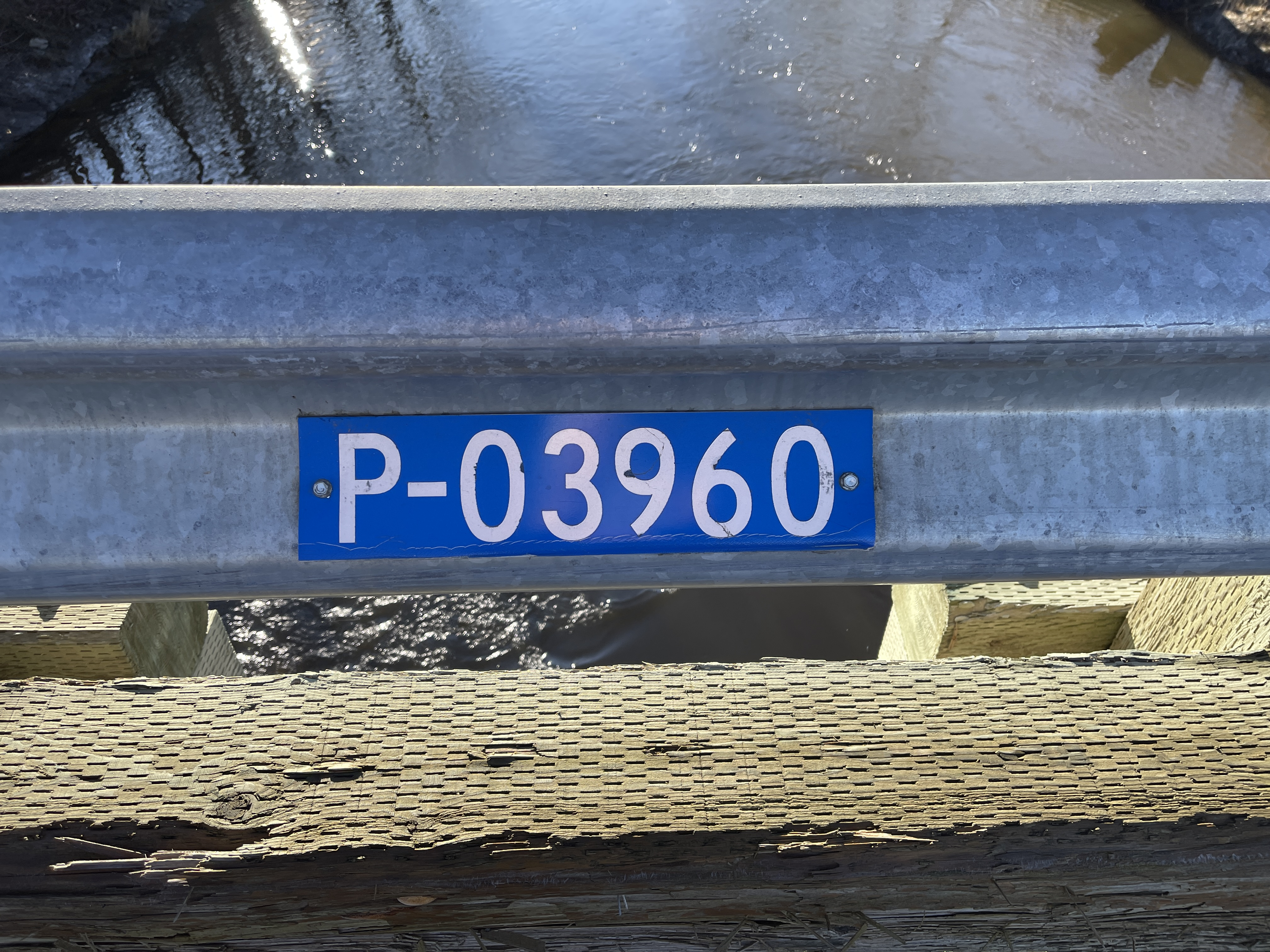
River and bridge P-03960, steel-wood (1918), rang du Haut-du-Lac Nord, Saint-Tite

== Major tributaries ==
The main tributaries of the Rivière des Envies are (from the head):

Left Bank:

• Outlet of Lake-aux-Chicots (in Sainte-Thècle) which receives the waters of the "rivière en coeur" (river in heart) at the site of the former sawmill of Clement Saint-Amand. The head of this small river is the "Lac en coeur" (lake in heart) which flows successively in "Lac des tounnes" and "Lac Croche" (crooked lake).

• Rivière Le Bourdais (Saint-Tite)

• Stream of Fools (ruisseau des fous) (Saint-Tite),

• Second Dick Creek (Saint-Tite).

Right bank:

• Archange Creek (Saint-Tite), taking its source at Lake Archange,

• Eric Creek (Saint-Tite), which flows into the "River des Envies" slightly upstream from the mouth of the North Mékinac River,

• North Mékinac River (Saint-Tite), which flows into the "River des Envies" at about 4.2 kilometres (2.6 mi) upstream of the town of Saint-Tite. Note: the river South Mékinac River empties into the North Mékinac River, 0.8 kilometres (0.50 mi) from the mouth of the latter,

• Dessureault creek(Saint-Stanislas (Les Chenaux)),

• Turtle River (ou rivière à la tortue) at (Saint-Stanislas (Les Chenaux)).

The most important tributaries of the "rivière des Envies" (carvings river) are the North Mékinac River and "Rivière à la tortue" (Tortoise river).

== Major lakes ==
The main lakes flowing into the tributaries of the river (or directly) are grouped by municipality:

- Sainte-Thècle:

Lake Jesuit (Lac du Jésuite), Lake de la Traverse, Lake Croche, Lake-aux-Chicots and "Lake-des-Tounes";

- Saint-Tite:

Lake Archange, lake-à-la-perchaude, lake Trottier, lake Éric and lake Roberge;

- Shawinigan (sector Lac-à-la-Tortue):

Turtle Lake (Lac-à-la-Tortue, in French).

On the south-west of the village of Saint-Tite, a bulge in the "rivière des envies" created the lake Kapibouska. Likely caused by a series of beaver dams, Lake Kapibouska is now gone. The watershed of the "River des Envies" also includes about half of the space covered by a large wetland located southeast of Lac-à-la-Tortue.

== The major floods ==
Every spring snowmelt in the watershed causes heavy floods, which have a greater impact in the meander upstream of the railway bridge in the village of Saint-Tite. Large floods can also be caused by prolonged heavy rains. Major floods have occurred:

- from September 28, 1924, when there were heavy rains for a week. Many of the bridges over the "river-des-Envies" were swept from Sainte-Thècle up to Saint-Stanislas. The village of Saint-Tite and area meander upstream, suffered flood; The newspaper Le Bien Public of Oct. 2, 1924 reports: "The service from Ste-Thècle to Trois-Rivières, via St-Tite was interrupted for a couple of days, and the train service on the Canadian National Railway had to undergo great delays".;
- In 1936 when the dam of Lake Roberge (Grandes-Piles) was broken. Several bridges have been swept away by the current, the four bridges at Saint-Séverin and several docks bridge filled with stones. Some portion of the city of Saint-Tite was then flooded.

== Main bridges ==
Note: Bridges listed in order from the mouth.

=== Saint-Stanislas (Les Chenaux) ===
1. Road Bridge 352 (situated at the southern boundary of the village of Saint-Stanislas (Les Chenaux), at the mouth of the river.

2. Jesuit mill, near upstream of the existing bridge road 352.

3. Marchand Road Bridge, which connects the south shore to road 159 (on the north side).

4. Bridge of the road 159, about 4.3 kilometres (2.7 mi) by water from the mouth.

5. Ex-railway bridge, upstream of the bridge near the road 159.

=== Saint-Séverin (Mékinac) ===
6. Bridge road of Trefflé Veillette, connecting Road "Rivière des Envies" (south-east), with the "Chemin de la Rivière-des-Envies" (north-east). This bridge is about 4.6 kilometres (2.9 mi) upstream by water from the bridge of Road 159. Marcel Veillette (Saint-Séverin (Mékinac)) said in 1994: "The wooden bridges that spanned the Rivière des Envies on this road were built by the Veillette owners of the surrounding land. Three times the torrential waters carried them (including 1936). The first bridge in the history of the area was built a little further upstream on the adjacent lot owned (at the time) by Majoric Brière. Today, this lot belongs to my brothers Denis and Marius Veillette." The concrete bridge was built in 1943. The three previous bridges were made of wood.

7. Mill Bridge, in the village of Saint-Séverin, in the fall, downstream of the existing bridge Blvd. St. Louis.

8. Bridge in the village of Saint-Séverin (Mékinac) (route 159), boul. St. Louis. This bridge is about 4.5 kilometres (2.8 mi) by water upstream from the bridge Veillette.

9. Bridge connecting the road to the mill (north shore) to the road of Rivière des Envies (South-West). This bridge is about 2.8 kilometres (1.7 mi) by water, upstream from the bridge in the village of Saint-Séverin (Mékinac). According to the 1861 census, the sawmill of Nicolas Vandal (originally from l'Ancienne-Lorette) was already in operation there. Located in the area of the falls, the mill was demolished in 1970 and its last owner was Albani Vandal. A flour mill Lafrance was built next.

=== Saint-Tite ===
10. Bordeleau Bridge (covered bridge, built in wood) on the road Dessureault in Saint-Tite. This road connects Rang Sud (Row South) and Grand Rang (Grand Row) in Saint-Tite at Cossetteville. This covered bridge is about 3.4 kilometres (2.1 mi) by water upstream from Mill Road Bridge in Saint-Séverin (Mékinac).

11. Railway Bridge "Canadian National", at the southern edge of the village of Saint-Tite. This bridge is about 7.5 kilometres (4.7 mi) by water upstream of the bridge Bordeleau, or about 6.6 kilometres (4.1 mi) in a direct line. The railway arrived in Saint-Tite in 1884.

12. Du Moulin Street Bridge (Mill Street Bridge) in the village of Saint-Tite. This bridge is about 2.3 kilometres (1.4 mi) by water from the railway bridge, due to the sinuosity of the river (or 1.5 kilometres in a direct line). An iron bridge was built on Du Moulin Street in 1923 and replaced in 1984 by the current bridge.

13. Bridge of Le Bourdais Street (Road 153) in Saint-Tite. This bridge is about 1.9 kilometres (1.2 mi) upstream by water from Du Moulin Street Bridge, due to the sinuosity of the river (or 1 kilometre in a direct line).

14. Road of North Upper Lake bridge (Haut du Lac Nord), at the North-West of Saint-Tite village. This bridge is 4 kilometres (2.5 mi) in a direct line from Le Bourdais Street Bridge. The tributary Little Mékinac North River (Petite Rivière Mékinac Nord) taking its source at Lake Roberge in Saint-Tite, empties into the "Rivière des Envies" 100 metres (330 ft) downstream of the Road of North Upper Lake Bridge (Haut du lac Nord). Pierre Lebrun published in the book "Histoire de Saint-Tite (History of Saint-Tite) - 1833 to 1984" as the first parish core was formed right in front of the mouth of the Little Mékinac North River. He noted: "And the first bridge over the Rivière des Envies at the top of the third portage, was more than two miles above the city center of Saint-Tite. And they built a bridge over the Little Mékinac North River before erecting one near at the first chapel of Saint-Tite."

15. Germain Road Bridge, in Saint-Tite. This bridge is about 5.8 kilometres (3.6 mi) in a direct line upstream from the Upper North Lake road bridge in Saint-Tite.

=== Sainte-Thècle ===
16. Sawmill Alfred Naud's bridge, located in row Saint-Joseph-South, in Sainte-Thècle, on the fifth lot of land (formerly known "land of the fall") from the boundary of Saint-Tite and Sainte-Thècle. Around 1878, Alfred Naud had built the mill "to the stilt" powered by water falls that turned a turbine. This private road allowed people of row Saint-Joseph-South to cross the bridge (fitted for the saw mill activities) to join the row St-Michel-South, by taking the path at the boundary of two lands (one of which belonged later to Armand St-Amand and Marguerite Tellier). This private road was used until about 1883 after the construction of the road Marchand (linking the St-Michel-South and St-Joseph-South Road). This sawmill was demolished between 1890 and 1898.

17. St-Joseph Road Bridge (intersection of Route Marchand) in Sainte-Thècle. This bridge is located 6.6 kilometers in direct line upstream from Germain bridge road, in Saint-Tite.

18. Bridge of the Rénovat Chouinard sawmill powered by steam, built circa 1903 in front of the residence of Octave Tellier, on the "rivière des Envies" on the riverside of the village. A bridge was built mainly for mill's activities. Previously, Rénovat Chouinard built in 1899 the first sawmill at the outlet of Lake of Traverse (Lac de la Traverse). He sold it in 1902 to Alfred St-Amand.

19. Various bridges on private lots between sawmill of Rénovat Chouinard the sawmill of Alfred St-Amand, including: Louis Toupin, Euclid Tellier, Georges Perron and Alfred Huot.

20. Bridge saw mill of St-Amand which belonged successively from father to son, Alfred, Adelard and Roland St-Amand. This private bridge downstream of the mill (on the old road of St-Amand) was mainly used for the mill activities. It was rebuilt in 1958 to allow the passage of heavy trucks.

21. Bridge of Lac of the Jesuit road, at the outlet of Lake-of-the-Traverse, at the head of the "rivière des Envies". This bridge is 2.3 kilometres (1.4 mi) by water (and direct) of the Bridge of St Joseph road (intersection of Route Marchand). In the early 20th century, the first bridge was built over the old government road (which skirted the sawmill). Then the parish built a new wooden bridge in around 1933 of only one lane. This bridge was rebuilt in 1950 for two lane traffic. In 2010, the government rebuilt the cement bridge, the bridge deck is now higher than the former.

== See also ==
- Pont Veillette sur la rivière des Envies à Saint-Séverin, comté de Champlain, 1943, Fonds Ministère de la Culture et des Communications, Bibliothèque et Archives nationales du Québec (Photo)
- Pont Veillette sur la rivière des Envies à Saint-Séverin, comté de Champlain, 1944, Fonds Ministère de la Culture et des Communications (Photo)
- Plan régional des milieux humides et hydriques- MRC de Mékinac- Andrée-Ann Cloutier Société d’aménagement et de mise en valeur du bassin de la Batiscan (SAMBBA - OBV Batiscan-Champlain). Document de travail
- Water Atlas, Ministry of the Environment, the Fight Against Climate Change, Wildlife and Parks Quebec (in French)
- Sainte-Thècle
- Saint-Tite
- Hérouxville
- Saint-Sévérin
- Saint-Stanislas (Les Chenaux)
- Lac-à-la-Tortue
- Batiscan River
- Batiscanie
- Jean-Joseph Casot
- Mekinac Regional County Municipality
- Lake Jesuit
- Lake Traverse (Mékinac)
