= Pierre-Paul River =

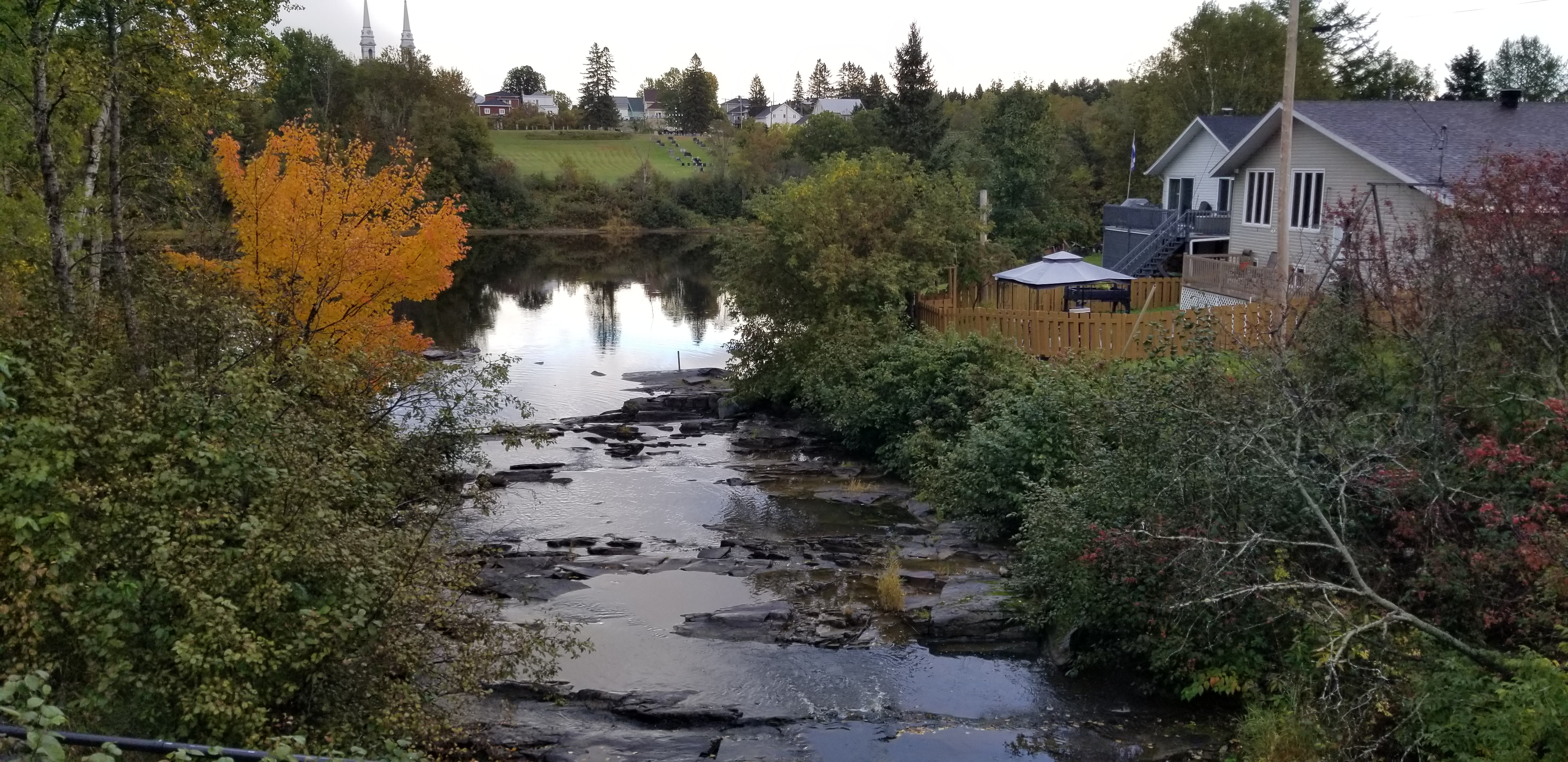
- Mouth of Pierre-Paul River, Batiscan River), from the bridge of route 352, view of the village and Saint-Adelphe, the church

Location
- Country: Canada
- Province: Quebec
- Region: Mauricie
- Regional County Municipalities: Mékinac Regional County Municipality
- Municipalities: Saint-Tite, Sainte-Thècle and Lac-aux-Sables

Physical characteristics
- Source: Lake Pierre-Paul (Mékinac)
  - location: Saint-Tite
  - coordinates: 46°44′45″N 72°30′18″W
  - elevation: 153 m
- Mouth: Rivière aux Castors Noirs (via Lac aux Biscuits)
  - location: Batiscan River in Saint-Adelphe
  - coordinates: 46°43′54″N 72°26′15″W
  - elevation: 100 m

Basin features
- Tributaries
  - left: (Upward from the mouth) Bras de la Rivière Pierre-Paul, unidentified stream coming from rang Saint-Georges.
  - right: (Upward from the mouth) Unidentified stream.

"Pierre-Paul River" in Batiscanie, in Quebec

The Pierre-Paul River flows into the Mékinac Regional County Municipality, in the administrative area of the Mauricie, in the province of Quebec, Canada, through these three municipalities of the Batiscanie: Saint-Tite, Sainte-Thècle and Saint-Adelphe.

== Course ==
This river flowing over 14 kilometres (8.7 mi) originates at the mouth of Pierre-Paul Lake, located in Rang Saint-Pierre, in the eastern part of the territory of Saint-Tite. Because of sometimes mountainous terrain, the main course of the river describes a big "Z" through predominantly agricultural land (a forest in the early part of the course, due to the reforestation of former agricultural land in the area north of Pierre-Paul Lake).

From its source, the river flows through the "road Pierre-Paul" and headed straight north across four lots in row St-Thomas (South) situated in the territory of Saint-Tite, then continuous in Sainte-Thècle, draining 10 lots in row St-Thomas (South), where it crosses the first time the road Charest. At around 2.5 kilometres (1.6 mi) from its source, the river is a small prank on two lots in row St-George (South) in Sainte-Thècle. Pierre-Paul river receives water from most largest tributaries of the row St-George (South), including Gagnon creek that empties into the river Pierre-Paul on the lot 351-116 of rang St-Thomas (at the limit of rang St-Georges).

The second segment of its course is almost in a straight line and flows on 6.4 kilometres (4.0 mi). Pierre-Paul river bifurcates in rang St-George (South) to almost 160 degrees to the right to head straight south. In this segment of its course, the river flow back into row St-Thomas (South) where it crosses again the road Charest and crossing in diagonal six lots. Its path then crosses the limit of Saint-Adelphe and cut nine lots of row St-Emile. The river is then only 1.6 kilometres (0.99 mi) from its source. The river continues to flow on six lots in row St-Pierre, before making a small prank on three lots in the 4th row Northeast Rivière des Envies (in Saint-Tite). With its tributaries streams, Pierre-Paul River receives the waters of 4th row Northeast Rivière des Envies and a small area of northern territory of Saint Séverin.

The third segment of the route is along 3.4 kilometres (2.1 mi). Pierre-Paul river then branches off into Saint-Tite on 120 degrees to the left to go straight north through four lots in the row St-Pierre Saint-Adelphe. It course cut eight lots in row St-Alphonse and some lots of the Southwest of the Batiscan River. In the end of course, the river makes a few curves before throwing in the Batiscan River (on the southwest side), up to the village of Saint-Adelphe. In 1925, the municipality built a new covered bridge on Pierre-Paul River, almost at its mouth, that is the current road 352.

== History ==
At the end of the 19th and early 20th centuries, Pierre-Paul River was used especially in the spring (or during large floods) for timber transport by flotation this which involved activities loggers or "cageux". In spring 1872, Felix Lafontaine and his men (Edward Methot, Irvine Johnson, Alfred Buist, Pierre Bordeau (son of Michael), Pierre Lafontaine (son of Hilaire) and Georges Thiffeau (son of Hubert) were down logs in-beyond the causeway on the small river and owned by Price Brothers. On May 9, 1872, these men were arrested and accused of taking possession of the road May 9, 1872 the Constitutional.

At the end of the 19th century, an ice road was laid from December to March on Pierre-Paul River to flow more easily to woodlots or to Saint-Tite before the land routes were fit for wheeled freight vehicles, especially to cross the streams.

Close to its mouth, the bridge of the route 352 crosses Pierre-Paul river at the village (South West side of the Batiscan river).

== Arm of Pierre-Paul River ==
The creek "Piché" drains much of the farmland in row St-Thomas of Sainte-Thècle cutting perpendicularly twenty lots on about 5 kilometres (3.1 mi) (from North to South) up to Rompré road designated route 352 (linking Saint-Adelphe and Sainte-Thècle). The crossing of creek Piché and route 352 marks the boundary between the two municipalities. On its path in row St-Thomas, creek Piché has collected the waters of two small tributaries (one is creek Francoeur) that drain two areas of southeastern row Saint-Georges. After the foundation of Sainte-Thècle (in 1873), the settlers built a forestry road in this area in order to connect Sainte-Thècle to Batiscan river. This forestry road was necessary for logging industry, to more easily reach Saint-Stanislas and allow the priest of Sainte-Thècle to make the trip for serving families of the future Saint-Adelphe parish. This road was hardly suitable in summer for wagon until the 19th century. The overflow of the creek Piché blocked temporarily the road every spring, preventing them from circulating.

From the Rompré road (road 352), this small stream is called "Arm of Pierre-Paul River" (bras de la rivière Pierre-Paul). This river flows south crossing on 3 kilometres (1.9 mi) (almost in a straight line) 11 farm lots in row St-Émile in Saint-Adelphe up to the bridge of St-Emile road. From this bridge, this small river flows in a more sinuous path on 2.3 kilometres (1.4 mi) by water (or 1.7 kilometres (1.1 mi) in a straight line) in the Southwest Batiscan River row and empties into the Pierre-Paul River. There is about 0.6 kilometres (0.37 mi) by water from the mouth of the "Arm of Pierre-Paul River" and the mouth of "Pierre-Paul River", which flows into the Batiscan River (West bank) at the level of the village of Saint-Adelphe.

Native Americans artifacts in row St-Thomas

Long before the arrival of the first French-Canadian settlers, Native Americans were present in the Saint-Thomas row in Sainte-Thècle. In the 1970s, Emile Tessier, farmer, found some Native American artifacts on lots 351-107 and 351-108 of St-Thomas row, which he has owned from 1949 to 1981. These artifacts dated from the "prehistoric archaic" period (BC) were mostly cut and polished stones, as instruments of hunting and working in Native American prehistory. These preserved artifacts are stored at the University of Quebec at Trois-Rivières (UQTR). Many of them were exposed in June 1974 at the Morin room during celebrations of the centenary of Sainte-Thècle in collaboration with the archaeologist René Ribes. These Native American artifacts have been found around the "creek Piché" and a tributary stream (coming from North), about 2.3 kilometres (1.4 mi) in a straight line from the Batiscan River.

== Toponymy ==
In the early 1870s, the place name "Pierre-Paul" meant an area of the mouth of the said river, on the right bank of the Batiscan River. This area was at the end of the 19th century the original core of the village of Saint-Adelphe (southwest bank of the Batiscan River). Thereafter the church of the village was built in front of the mouth, on the other side of the Batiscan River. The mouth of the Pierre-Paul river is located between that of the Rivière des Envies (Saint-Stanislas) and Tawachiche River (Lac-aux-Sables) on the right bank of the Batiscan River.

According to one theory, the origin of the name and the "Lake Pierre-Paul" and "Pierre-Paul River" would be linked to an Indian family, called Pierre-Paul, who lived near the Pierre-Paul lake.

According to another theory, the place name "Pierre-Paul" is a popular adaptation, derivative of the apostles of early Christian names, like the names of rows detached from the former territory of Saint-Stanislas, including: row St-Pierre (in Saint-Tite where is the Pierre-Paul lake), row St-Paul (in Saint-Séverin) and St-Thomas (in Sainte-Thècle). At the head of the river, Pierre-Paul lake is located in the row Saint-Pierre Saint-Tite. In a segment of his path, "Pierre-Paul river" back across the row St-Pierre (in the southern part of Saint-Adelphe), but does not affect the row St-Paul (Saint-Séverin), which is further south. However, the path of St-Emile Saint-Adelphe, Quebec, can reach the 4th road of Saint-Tite, Quebec, the Dessureault road, then Dessureault bridge over the Rivière des Envies, to attain:

- Another row St-Pierre (located further south, or Hérouxville, Quebec and Saint-Séverin) and
- Row St-Paul (in Saint-Séverin).

In French Canada, the Pierre-Paul surname is common as a male name. While the family surname of Pierre-Paul is generally found among the black African ancestry families.

The names "Lake Pierre-Paul" "Pierre-Paul River" was officially registered at the Commission de toponymie du Québec (Geographical Names Board of Québec) on December 5, 1968. While the toponym "Arm of Pierre-Paul River" (the largest tributary of the Pierre-Paul river) was included in the register on December 18, 1979, as a "stream".

== Photos ==
Pierre-Paul River

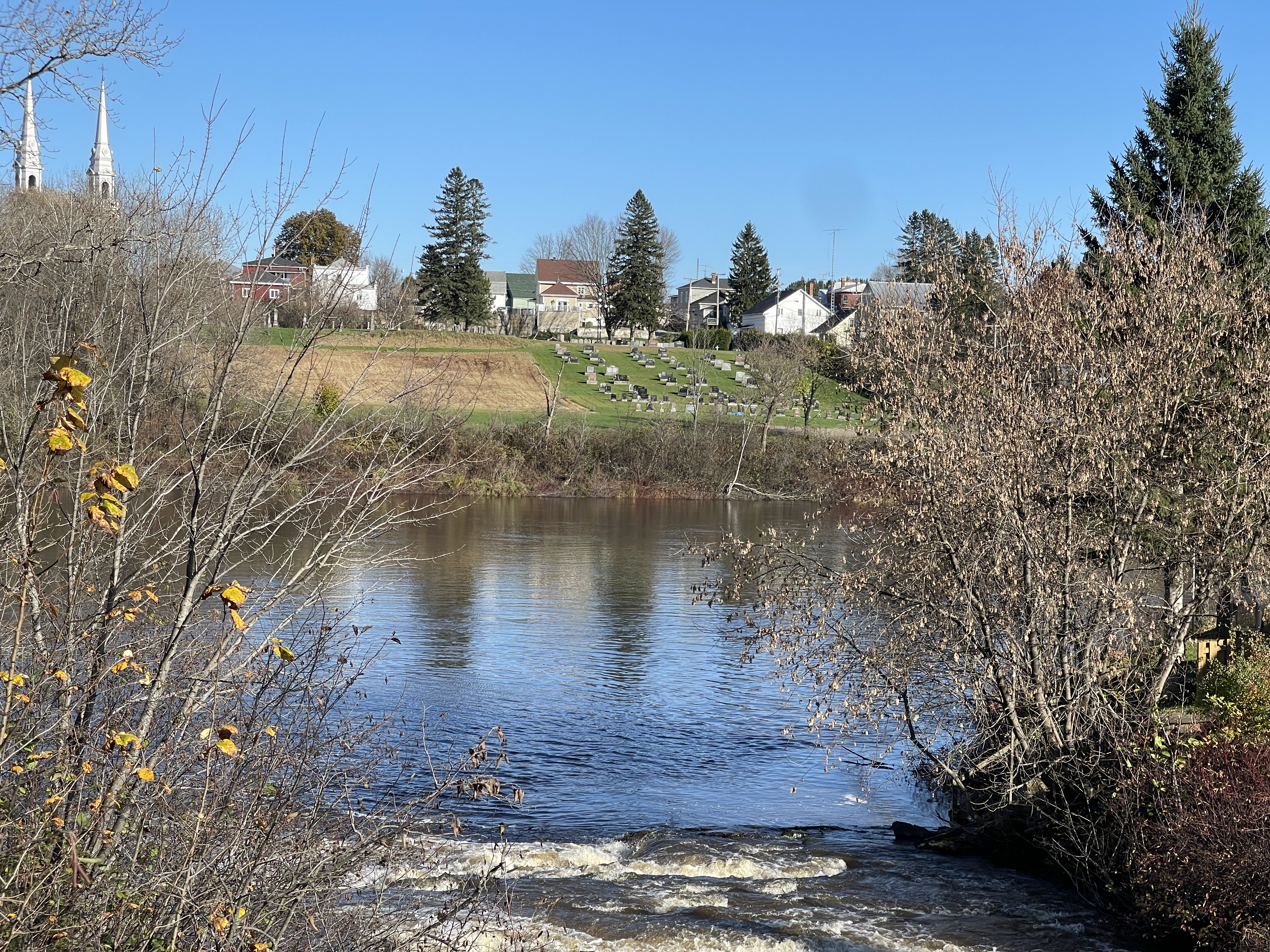
Mouth of the river, Batiscan River, bridge P01548, reinforced concrete girders (1950), Route 352, spires of the bell towers of the Catholic church, village, cultivated field, cemetery Curé Adélard-Lamy, Saint-Adelphe

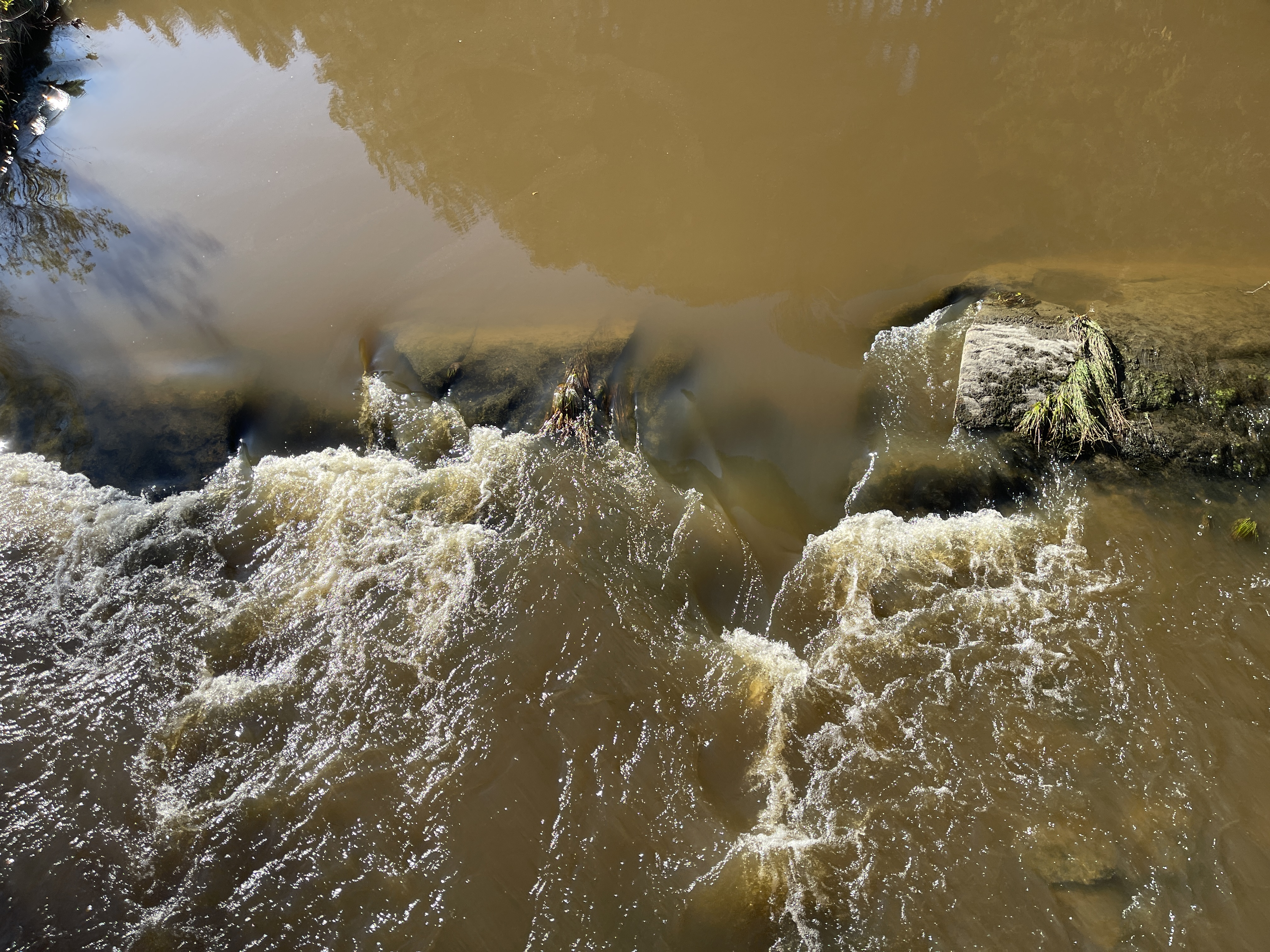
Upstream, from the P01548 bridge, reinforced concrete girders (1950), Route 352, Saint-Adelphe

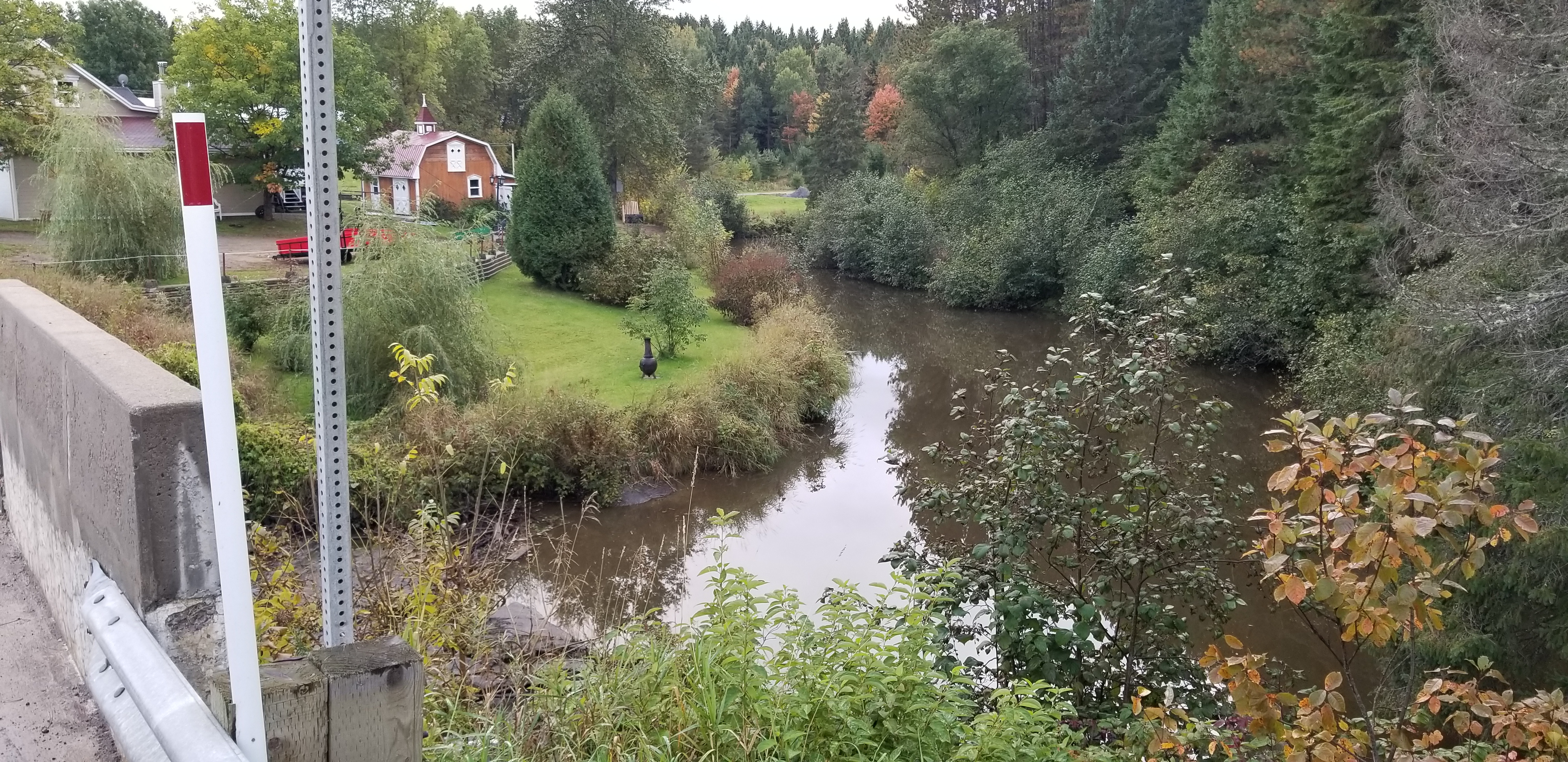
Upstream, from the Highway 352 bridge, Saint-Adelphe

== See also ==
- Lake Pierre-Paul (Mékinac)
- Batiscanie
- Batiscan River
- Rivière des Envies
- Provincial riding of Laviolette
- Mékinac Regional County Municipality
- Saint-Tite
- Sainte-Thècle
- Saint-Adelphe
