= Lake Pierre-Paul =

Lake Pierre-Paul (Mekinac)
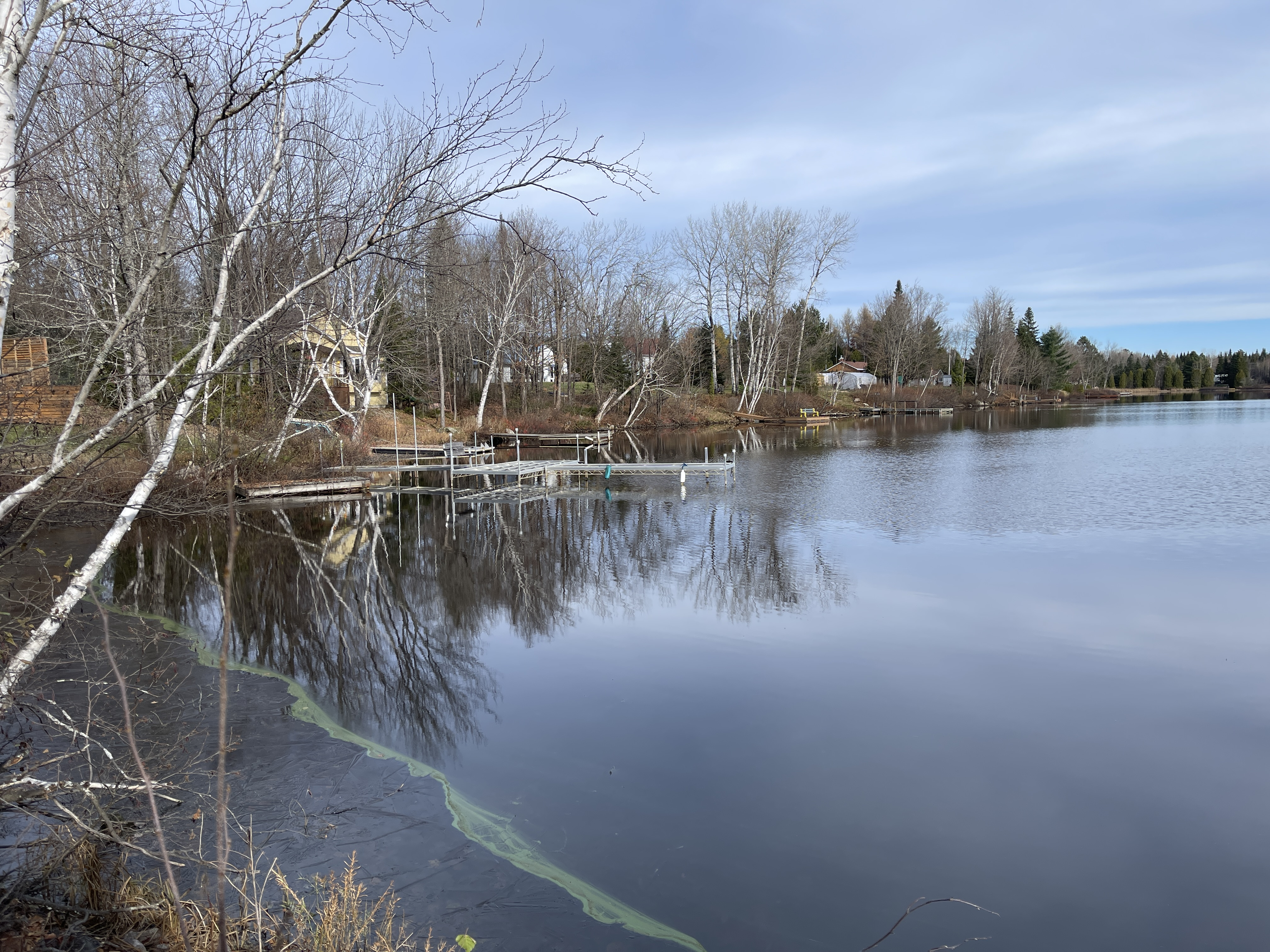
- Chemin de l'Île

- Location within Quebec
- Location: Saint-Tite, Mékinac Regional County Municipality, Quebec, Canada
- Coordinates: 46.743°N 72.513°W
- Lake type: Natural
- Primary outflows: Pierre-Paul River
- Surface elevation: 150 m (490 ft)

The Lake Pierre-Paul (Mekinac) is located at Saint-Tite in Mékinac Regional County Municipality, in the administrative region of Mauricie, in the province of Quebec, Canada.

== Toponymy ==
Lake Pierre-Paul

At 4 km northeast of Saint-Tite, in Mauricie region, is this lake with a peninsula in its centre. It is located at a height of more than 150 m. However, it is in honour of an Amerindian family, named Pierre Paul, who lived on the shores of this lake, that the official name was assigned. The name Pierre-Paul also refers to the Pierre-Paul River which flows into the Batiscan River, at the height of the municipality of Saint-Adelphe, and it was used to designate this small settlement in the early 1870s, before it was erected into a parish. Today, Lac Pierre-Paul is a vacation spot almost entirely lined with cottages. As for the land cleared in the nineteenth century in the northern part of the lake, it has been abandoned and reforested. Source : Pierre-Paul Lake, Toponymy Commission Quebec

== Geography ==
Lake Pierre-Paul is fed by four tributaries from the land to the north, west and south. The outlet is located to the east and drains into the marsh of the water body.

The watershed has an approximate area of 3.8 km^{2}. It extends further west and south. The trophic status of the lake is at an advanced intermediate stage of eutrophication, with high nutrient and sediment inputs. The surface area of the body of water is 0.6km². There are approximately 147 permanent or temporary residences along the waterfront. The lake has been affected by cyanobacteria in recent years. Source: Voluntary Lake Monitoring Network, 2010, Environmental Policy, City of Saint-Tite 2012.

== Ecology ==
The Challenges

Lake Pierre-Paul is considered a eutrophic lake, the lake is affected by cyanobacteria, for this reason the water quality is questionable downstream of the Rivière des Envies where the downgrading factor is phosphorus.

On wetlands in the Pierre-Paul River watershed, drainage is the main pressure. It may be of agricultural origin due to the dominance of this condition in the Geographical Units of Analysis (UGA). Plants in riparian buffers act as filters against water pollution.

The agricultural and forest lands of Mékinac encourage the emergence of non-traditional crops and small farms that can be developed by agritourism activities.

A colder climate has potential for the cultivation of flowering plants (e.g. rapeseed)

== Photos ==
Saint-Tite, Pierre-Paul Lake

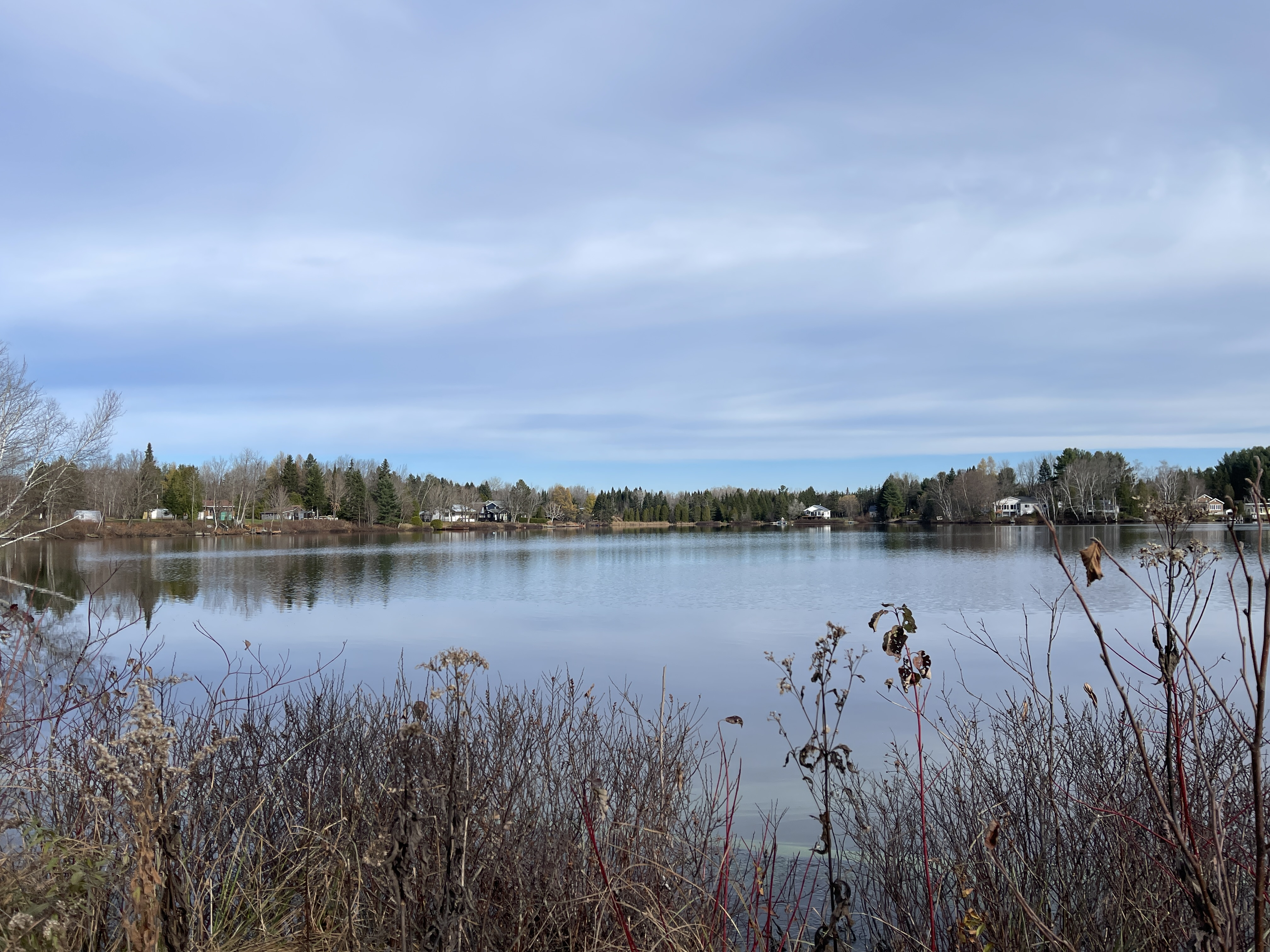
Chemin de l'Ìle

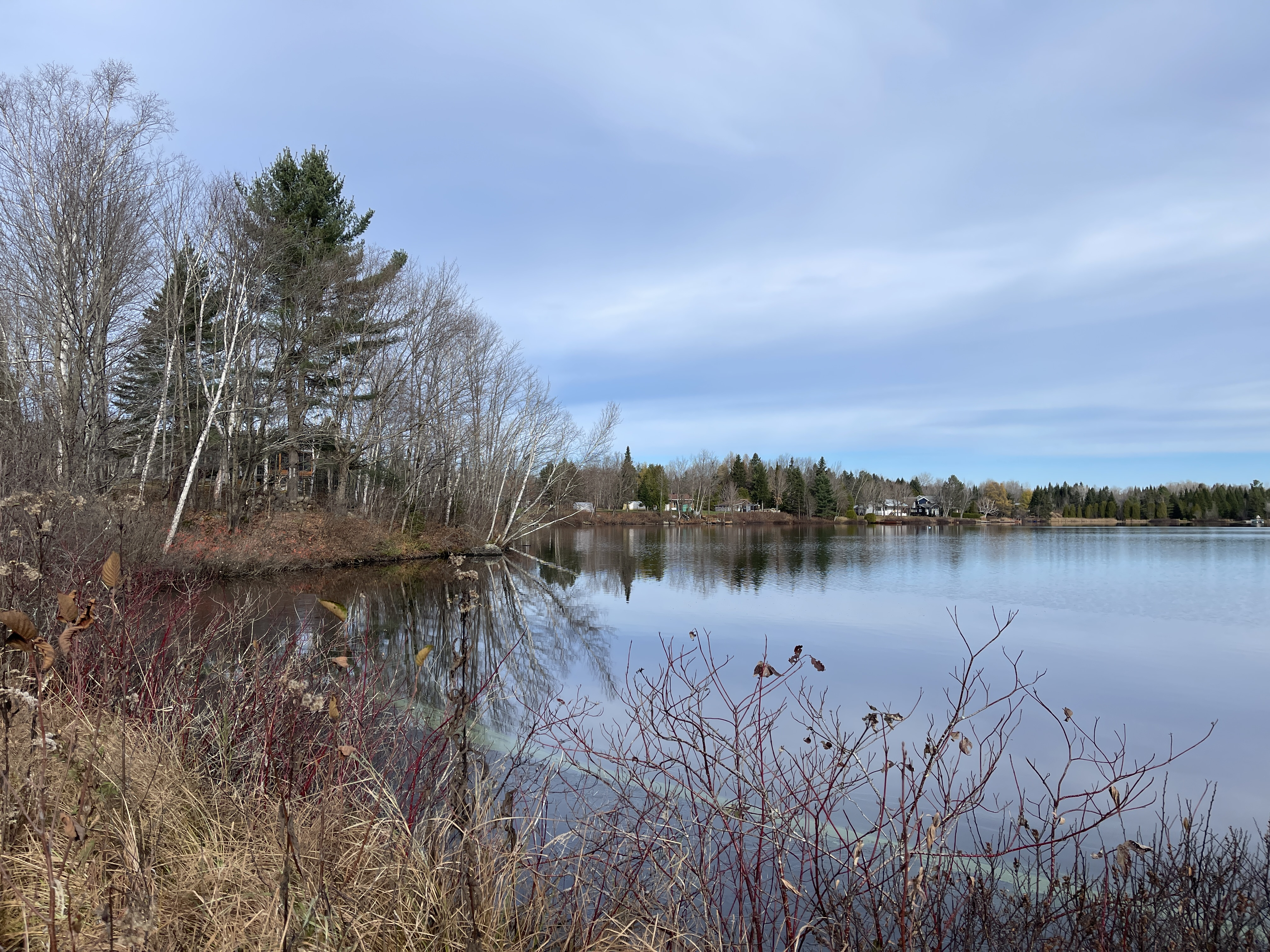
Chemin de l'Ìle

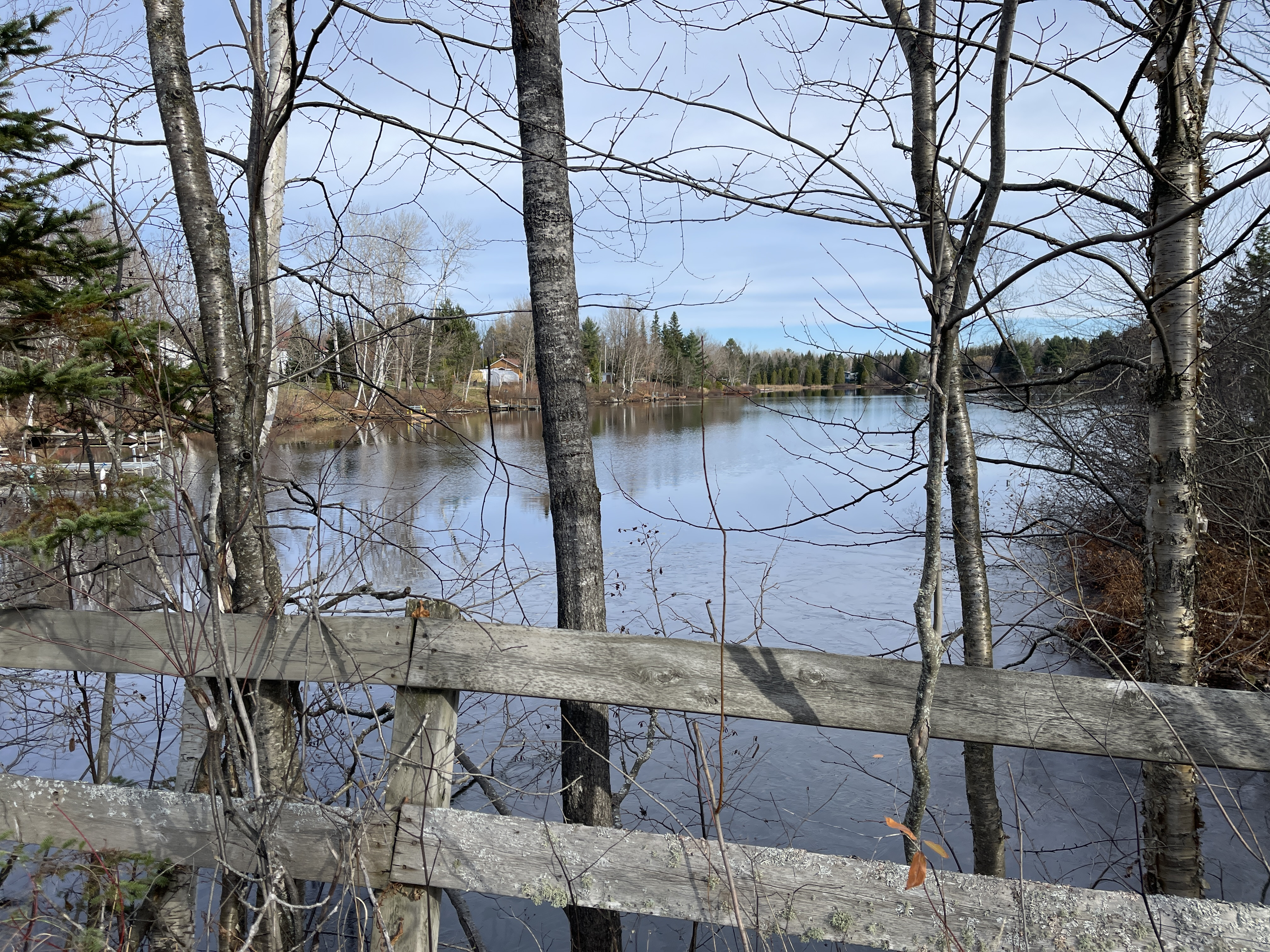
Chemin de l'Ìle

== See also ==
- Batiscanie
- Pierre-Paul River
- Batiscan River
- Rivière des Envies
- Mekinac Regional County Municipality (RCM)
- Saint-Tite (Quebec)
- Sainte-Thècle (Quebec)
- Saint-Adelphe (Quebec)
