= André Leduc =

Canadian politician (1919–2001)

Member of the Legislative Assembly of Quebec for Laviolette
- In office 1966–1970
- Preceded by: Romulus Ducharme
- Succeeded by: Prudent Carpentier

Personal details
- Born: October 25, 1919 Grand-Mère, Quebec
- Died: January 31, 2001 (aged 81) Grand-Mère, Quebec
- Party: Union Nationale

André Leduc (October 25, 1919 – January 31, 2001) was a politician in Quebec, Canada. He was a member of the Legislative Assembly of Quebec/National Assembly of Quebec (MNA).

== Background ==
He was born on October 25, 1919, in Grand-Mère, Mauricie and worked in a grocery store.

== Political career ==
Leduc ran as a Union Nationale candidate in the district of Laviolette in the 1966 election and won. He succeeded eight-term Union Nationale incumbent Romulus Ducharme.

He did not run for re-election in the 1970 election.

== Death ==
Leduc died on January 31, 2001, in Grand-Mère.
