= Julie Boulet =

Canadian politician

The Honourable Julie Boulet
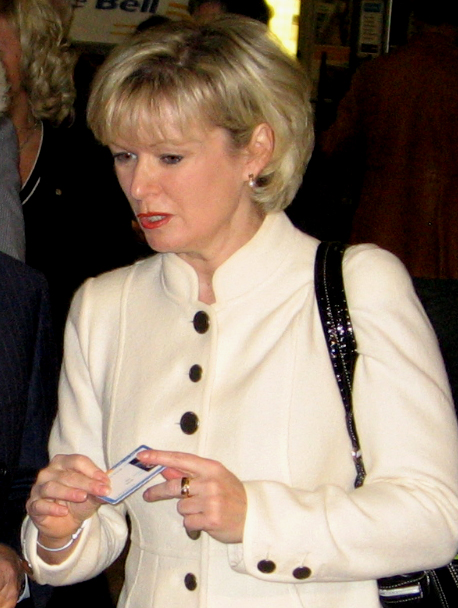

Member of the National Assembly of Quebec for Laviolette
- In office October 1, 2001 – October 1, 2018
- Preceded by: Jean-Pierre Jolivet

Personal details
- Born: December 5, 1959 (age 66) Saint-Tite, Quebec, Canada
- Party: Quebec Liberal Party
- Relatives: Jean Boulet (brother)
- Portfolio: Minister of Tourism

Julie Boulet (French: [ʒyli bulɛ]; born June 16, 1959 in Saint-Tite, Quebec) is a Canadian politician. Boulet is a former Member of National Assembly for the Quebec riding of Laviolette in the Mauricie region. A member of the Quebec Liberal Party, she was Minister of Transport (2007-2010) and Minister of Employment and Social Solidarity (2010-2012) in the Charest government.

== Biography ==
Boulet attended Université Laval and obtained a bachelor's degree in pharmacy. In the community, she was the chair of the town's main festival, the Festival Western de Saint-Tite which takes place in early September of each year. She is also a volunteer of the festival for 12 years.

Boulet was a Liberal candidate for the federal riding of Champlain in the 2000 elections but lost by 15 votes to the Bloc Québécois. She attempted again at provincial politics and was elected in Laviolette in a by-election in 2001. She was re-elected in the 2003 provincial elections. She was briefly the Delegate Minister of Health, Social Services and the Status of Seniors before being named Delegate Minister for Transport. After she was re-elected in 2007, she was named Minister for Transport after incumbent Minister Michel Després was defeated in Jean-Lesage by the Action Démocratique du Québec. Since 2003, she is also the Minister responsible for the Mauricie region. She was the only Liberal MNA to be re-elected in 2007 in the Mauricie region as the ADQ won the remaining seats.

As Minister of Transportation, she introduced legislation related to road safety including the use of hand-held phones, lowering the legal blood alcohol level (for driving) to 0.5 milligrams per litre and tougher penalties for offences such as drunk driving. However, both the Parti Québécois and the Action democratique du Quebec, which formed a majority opposition, did not support the legislation regarding the blood alcohol level limit and thus will remain at 0.8 milligrams per litre. She also announced plans to fully rebuild the Turcot Interchange in Montreal. She also announced a large plan for the rehabilitation and improvements of aging infrastructure such as bridges and overpasses across the province in light of the Laval Autoroute 19 overpass collapse in 2006 as well as the Johnson Commission, which was in charge of the investigation of the structural failure. Finally in October 2007, the government announced its funding for the city of Gatineau's Rapibus rapid transit system for the Société de Transport de l'Outaouais, slated for completion for 2010.

She was also Minister of Tourism and responsible for Mauricie.

Political offices
Preceded by Michel Després (Liberal)	Minister of Transport; 2007–2010	Succeeded by Sam Hamad
Preceded by Sam Hamad	Minister of Employment and Social Solidarity; 2010–2012	Succeeded by Agnès Maltais
