= Prudent Carpentier =

Canadian politician (1922–2019)

Member of the National Assembly of Quebec for Laviolette
- In office 1970–1976
- Preceded by: André Leduc
- Succeeded by: Jean-Pierre Jolivet

Personal details
- Born: March 13, 1922 Saint-Tite (Mauricie), Quebec
- Died: March 22, 2019 (aged 97)
- Party: Liberal

Prudent Carpentier (March 13, 1922 – March 22, 2019) was a politician from Quebec, Canada. He was a Member of the National Assembly (MNA).

== Background ==
He was born on March 13, 1922, in Saint-Tite, Mauricie and worked in forestry.

== Political career ==
Carpentier ran as a Liberal candidate in the district of Laviolette in 1970, and won. He succeeded Union Nationale incumbent André Leduc.

In 1976 though, he was defeated by Parti Québécois candidate Jean-Pierre Jolivet.
