= Laviolette (electoral district) =

Quebec electoral district
- Coordinates: 47.560°N 72.981°W

Defunct provincial electoral district
- Legislature: National Assembly of Quebec
- District created: 1930
- District abolished: 2017
- First contested: 1931
- Last contested: 2014

Demographics
- Electors (2014): 35,771
- Area (km²): 35,726.7
- Census division(s): La Tuque, Mékinac Regional County Municipality
- Census subdivision(s): Shawinigan (part), Grandes-Piles, Hérouxville, La Bostonnais, Lac-aux-Sables, Lac-Édouard, La Tuque, Notre-Dame-de-Montauban, Saint-Adelphe, Saint-Roch-de-Mékinac, Saint-Séverin, Sainte-Thècle, Saint-Tite, Trois-Rives; Coucoucache, Obedjiwan, Wemotaci; Lac-Boulé, Lac-Masketsi, Lac-Normand, Rivière-de-la-Savane

Laviolette (French pronunciation: [lavjɔlɛt]) was a provincial electoral district in the Mauricie region of Quebec, Canada that elects members to the National Assembly of Quebec. It includes the city of La Tuque and its urban agglomeration, some parts of the city of Shawinigan, and various other municipalities.

It was created for the 1931 election from part of Champlain electoral district.

In the change from the 2001 to the 2011 electoral map, it gained Lac-aux-Sables and Notre-Dame-de-Montauban from Portneuf electoral district.

Following the change in the 2017 electoral map, the riding was dissolved into the new ridings of Laviolette–Saint-Maurice and Champlain.

It was named after the founder of Trois-Rivières in 1634, the Sieur de Laviolette.

== Members of the Legislative Assembly / National Assembly ==
| Legislature | Years | Member | Party |
|---|---|---|---|
Riding created from Champlain
| 18th | 1931–1935 | Joseph-Alphida Crête | Liberal |
| 19th | 1935–1936 | Romulus Ducharme | Action libérale nationale |
| 20th | 1936–1939 | Romulus Ducharme | Union Nationale |
| 21st | 1939–1944 | Edmond Guibord | Liberal |
| 22nd | 1944–1948 | Romulus Ducharme | Union Nationale |
| 23rd | 1948–1952 | Romulus Ducharme | Union Nationale |
| 24th | 1952–1956 | Romulus Ducharme | Union Nationale |
| 25th | 1956–1960 | Romulus Ducharme | Union Nationale |
| 26th | 1960–1962 | Romulus Ducharme | Union Nationale |
| 27th | 1962–1966 | Romulus Ducharme | Union Nationale |
| 28th | 1966–1970 | André Leduc | Union Nationale |
| 29th | 1970–1973 | Prudent Carpentier | Liberal |
| 30th | 1973–1976 | Prudent Carpentier | Liberal |
| 31st | 1976–1981 | Jean-Pierre Jolivet | Parti Québécois |
| 32nd | 1981–1985 | Jean-Pierre Jolivet | Parti Québécois |
| 33rd | 1985–1989 | Jean-Pierre Jolivet | Parti Québécois |
| 34th | 1989–1994 | Jean-Pierre Jolivet | Parti Québécois |
| 35th | 1994–1998 | Jean-Pierre Jolivet | Parti Québécois |
| 36th | 1998–2001 | Jean-Pierre Jolivet | Parti Québécois |
| 36th | 2001–2003 | Julie Boulet | Liberal |
| 37th | 2003–2007 | Julie Boulet | Liberal |
| 38th | 2007–2008 | Julie Boulet | Liberal |
| 39th | 2008–2012 | Julie Boulet | Liberal |
| 40th | 2012–2014 | Julie Boulet | Liberal |
| 41st | 2014–2018 | Julie Boulet | Liberal |

== Election results ==
2014 Quebec general election
| Party | Candidate | Votes | % | ±% |
|---|---|---|---|---|
| Liberal | Julie Boulet | 12,422 | 52.58 | +9.41 |
| Parti Québécois | André Beaudoin | 5,492 | 23.25 | -7.58 |
| Coalition Avenir Québec | Sylvain Gauthier | 4,432 | 18.76 | -0.78 |
| Québec solidaire | Jean-François Dubois | 1,104 | 4.67 | +0.91 |
| Option nationale | Gabriel-Olivier Clavet-Massicotte | 124 | 0.52 | -1.42 |
| Marxist–Leninist | Jean-Paul Bédard | 52 | 0.22 | -0.05 |
| Total valid votes | | 23,626 | 98.40 | |
| Total rejected ballots | | 385 | 1.60 | -0.19 |
| Turnout | | 24,011 | 67.12 | -4.73 |
| Electors on the lists | | 35,771 | – | |
| Liberal hold | | Swing | | +8.50 |

2012 Quebec general election
| Party | Candidate | Votes | % |
|---|---|---|---|
| Liberal | Julie Boulet | 10,903 | 43.17 |
| Parti Québécois | André Beaudoin | 7,787 | 30.83 |
| Coalition Avenir Québec | Sylvain Medzalabenleth | 4,934 | 19.53 |
| Québec solidaire | Jean-François Dubois | 951 | 3.77 |
| Option nationale | Gabriel Pelland | 492 | 1.95 |
| Independent | Jean Marceau | 124 | 0.49 |
| Marxist–Leninist | Jean-Paul Bédard | 62 | 0.27 |
| Total valid votes | | 25,258 | 98.20 |
| Total rejected ballots | | 462 | 1.80 |
| Turnout | | 25,720 | 71.86 |
| Electors on the lists | | 35,793 | – |

2008 Quebec general election
| Party | Candidate | Votes | % | ±% |
|---|---|---|---|---|
| Liberal | Julie Boulet | 11,645 | 59.13 | |
| Parti Québécois | Claude Lessard | 5,413 | 27.48 | |
| Action démocratique | Eric Tapps | 2,121 | 10.77 | |
| Québec solidaire | Remy Francoeur | 516 | 2.62 | |

2007 Quebec general election
| Party | Candidate | Votes | % |
|---|---|---|---|
| Liberal | Julie Boulet | 10,100 | 40.99 |
| Action démocratique | Stéphane Defoy | 6,826 | 27.70 |
| Parti Québécois | Patrick Lahaie | 6,687 | 27.14 |
| Green | Pierre Audette | 494 | 2.00 |
| Québec solidaire | Pierrette Doucet | 468 | 1.90 |
| Christian Democracy | Josée Lafontaine | 66 | 0.27 |
| Total valid votes | | 24,641 | 99.02 |
| Total rejected ballots | | 243 | 0.98 |
| Turnout | | 24,884 | 72.59 |
| Electors on the lists | | 34,279 | – |

2003 Quebec general election
| Party | Candidate | Votes | % |
|---|---|---|---|
| Liberal | Julie Boulet | 12,806 | 52.67 |
| Parti Québécois | Patrick Lahaie | 7,730 | 31.79 |
| Action démocratique | Sébastien Proulx | 3,453 | 14.20 |
| UFP | Yves Demers | 182 | 0.74 |
| Christian Democracy | Josée Lafontaine | 144 | 0.59 |
| Total valid votes | | 24,315 | 98.73 |
| Total rejected ballots | | 312 | 1.27 |
| Turnout | | 24,627 | 72.18 |
| Electors on the lists | | 34,121 | – |

Quebec provincial by-election, 2001
| Party | Candidate | Votes | % |
|---|---|---|---|
| Liberal | Julie Boulet | 13,260 | 61.41 |
| Parti Québécois | Yves Demers | 5,844 | 27.07 |
| Action démocratique | Jean-Pierre Grenier | 1,607 | 7.73 |
| Independent UFP | Christian Flamand | 620 | 2.87 |
| Bloc Pot | Josée Pellerin | 197 | 0.91 |
| Total valid votes | | 21,591 | 98.55 |
| Total rejected ballots | | 317 | 1.45 |
| Turnout | | 21,908 | 63.60 |
| Electors on the lists | | 34,445 | – |

1998 Quebec general election
| Party | Candidate | Votes | % |
|---|---|---|---|
| Parti Québécois | Jean-Pierre Jolivet | 14,411 | 54.13 |
| Liberal | Céline Trépanier | 9,291 | 34.90 |
| Action démocratique | Jean Trudel | 2,758 | 10.36 |
| Natural Law | Roger Périgny | 162 | 0.61 |
| Total valid votes | | 24,315 | 98.73 |
| Total rejected ballots | | 312 | 1.27 |
| Turnout | | 24,627 | 72.18 |
| Electors on the lists | | 34,067 | – |

1995 Quebec referendum
| Side | Votes | % |
|---|---|---|
| Oui | 17,177 | 56.75 |
| Non | 13,093 | 43.25 |

1994 Quebec general election
| Party | Candidate | Votes | % |
|---|---|---|---|
| Parti Québécois | Jean-Pierre Jolivet | 16,670 | 63.54 |
| Liberal | Gaston Fortin | 7,458 | 28.43 |
| Action démocratique | Jacques Beaudry | 1,880 | 7.17 |
| Natural Law | Yvon Chilton | 226 | 0.86 |
| Total valid votes | | 26,234 | 98.42 |
| Total rejected ballots | | 421 | 1.58 |
| Turnout | | 26,655 | 78.66 |
| Electors on the lists | | 33,886 | – |

1992 Charlottetown Accord referendum
| Side | Votes | % |
|---|---|---|
| Non | 17,432 | 64.66 |
| Oui | 9,527 | 35.34 |

1989 Quebec general election
| Party | Candidate | Votes | % |
|---|---|---|---|
| Parti Québécois | Jean-Pierre Jolivet | 17,021 | 66.18 |
| Liberal | Jean-Marie St-Pierre | 8,697 | 33.82 |
| Total valid votes | | 25,718 | 97.61 |
| Total rejected ballots | | 630 | 2.39 |
| Turnout | | 26,348 | 75.79 |
| Electors on the lists | | 34,763 | – |

1985 Quebec general election
| Party | Candidate | Votes | % |
|---|---|---|---|
| Parti Québécois | Jean-Pierre Jolivet | 15,134 | 56.33 |
| Liberal | Laurier Thibault | 11,733 | 43.67 |
| Total valid votes | | 26,867 | 97.93 |
| Total rejected ballots | | 569 | 2.07 |
| Turnout | | 27,436 | 77.70 |
| Electors on the lists | | 35,310 | – |

1981 Quebec general election
| Party | Candidate | Votes | % |
|---|---|---|---|
| Parti Québécois | Jean-Pierre Jolivet | 16,403 | 56.44 |
| Liberal | Jacques Buisson | 11,336 | 39.00 |
| Union Nationale | Aline Duplessis | 1,324 | 4.56 |
| Total valid votes | | 29,063 | 99.17 |
| Total rejected ballots | | 243 | 0.83 |
| Turnout | | 29,306 | 82.81 |
| Electors on the lists | | 35,388 | – |

1980 Quebec referendum
| Side | Votes | % |
|---|---|---|
| Non | 16,130 | 56.69 |
| Oui | 12,321 | 43.31 |

1976 Quebec general election
| Party | Candidate | Votes | % |
|---|---|---|---|
| Parti Québécois | Jean-Pierre Jolivet | 11,003 | 39.32 |
| Union Nationale | Gaston Fortin | 8,829 | 31.55 |
| Liberal | Prudent Carpentier | 6,074 | 21.71 |
| Ralliement créditiste | Michel Mignault | 1,603 | 5.73 |
| Parti national populaire | Réjean Gélinas | 357 | 1.28 |
| NDP-RMS Coalition | Robert Deschamps | 115 | 0.41 |
| Total valid votes | | 27,981 | 98.40 |
| Total rejected ballots | | 454 | 1.60 |
| Turnout | | 28,435 | 86.41 |
| Electors on the lists | | 32,908 | – |

1973 Quebec general election
| Party | Candidate | Votes | % |
|---|---|---|---|
| Liberal | Prudent Carpentier | 11,800 | 46.28 |
| Parti Québécois | Jean-Pierre Jolivet | 7,305 | 27.60 |
| Parti créditiste | Alphonse Poulin | 4,584 | 17.98 |
| Union Nationale | Jean-Marie Lafontaine | 2,076 | 8.14 |
| Total valid votes | | 25,495 | 98.39 |
| Total rejected ballots | | 417 | 1.61 |
| Turnout | | 25,912 | 82.88 |
| Electors on the lists | | 31,265 | – |

1973 Quebec general election
| Party | Candidate | Votes | % |
|---|---|---|---|
| Liberal | Prudent Carpentier | 6,974 | 28.57 |
| Parti créditiste | Alphonse Poulin | 6,677 | 27.36 |
| Union Nationale | Jean-Marie Lafontaine | 5,390 | 22.08 |
| Parti Québécois | Ralph Olsen | 5,365 | 21.98 |
| Total valid votes | | 24,406 | 98.08 |
| Total rejected ballots | | 479 | 1.92 |
| Turnout | | 24,885 | 85.20 |
| Electors on the lists | | 29,209 | – |

1966 Quebec general election
| Party | Candidate | Votes | % |
|---|---|---|---|
| Union Nationale | André Leduc | 12,082 | 54.16 |
| Liberal | Pierre-A. Larocque | 8,665 | 38.85 |
| RIN | Louis Denoncourt | 1,559 | 6.99 |
| Total valid votes | | 22,306 | 98.55 |
| Total rejected ballots | | 328 | 1.45 |
| Turnout | | 22,634 | 80.86 |
| Electors on the lists | | 27,990 | – |

1962 Quebec general election
| Party | Candidate | Votes | % |
|---|---|---|---|
| Union Nationale | Romulus Ducharme | 11,315 | 53.63 |
| Liberal | Laurier Thibault | 9,782 | 46.37 |
| Total valid votes | | 21,097 | 98.73 |
| Total rejected ballots | | 271 | 1.27 |
| Turnout | | 21,368 | 85.24 |
| Electors on the lists | | 25,069 | – |

1960 Quebec general election
| Party | Candidate | Votes | % |
|---|---|---|---|
| Union Nationale | Romulus Ducharme | 11,013 | 51.71 |
| Liberal | Joseph-Alfred Therrien | 10,285 | 48.29 |
| Total valid votes | | 21,298 | 98.62 |
| Total rejected ballots | | 298 | 1.38 |
| Turnout | | 21,596 | 88.87 |
| Electors on the lists | | 24,302 | – |

1956 Quebec general election
| Party | Candidate | Votes | % |
|---|---|---|---|
| Union Nationale | Romulus Ducharme | 11,848 | 59.46 |
| Liberal | Léo-Joffre Pilon | 8,079 | 40.54 |
| Total valid votes | | 19,927 | 98.81 |
| Total rejected ballots | | 240 | 1.19 |
| Turnout | | 20,167 | 82.94 |
| Electors on the lists | | 24,316 | – |

1952 Quebec general election
| Party | Candidate | Votes | % |
|---|---|---|---|
| Union Nationale | Romulus Ducharme | 9,598 | 52.67 |
| Liberal | Léo-Joffre Pilon | 8,626 | 47.33 |
| Total valid votes | | 18,224 | 98.63 |
| Total rejected ballots | | 253 | 1.37 |
| Turnout | | 18,477 | 82.44 |
| Electors on the lists | | 22,413 | – |

1948 Quebec general election
| Party | Candidate | Votes | % |
|---|---|---|---|
| Union Nationale | Romulus Ducharme | 8,612 | 54.05 |
| Liberal | Georges-Oscar Roy | 4,146 | 26.02 |
| Union des électeurs | Gabriel Lacasse | 3,176 | 19.93 |
| Total valid votes | | 15,934 | 99.04 |
| Total rejected ballots | | 154 | 0.96 |
| Turnout | | 16,088 | 79.84 |
| Electors on the lists | | 20,150 | – |

1944 Quebec general election
| Party | Candidate | Votes | % |
|---|---|---|---|
| Union Nationale | Romulus Ducharme | 7,455 | 55.04 |
| Liberal | Elzéar Dallaire | 4,113 | 30.37 |
| Bloc populaire | Joseph-Omer Journeault | 1,785 | 13.18 |
| Co-operative Commonwealth | Georges-Édouard Verrault | 192 | 1.42 |
| Total valid votes | | 13,545 | 99.31 |
| Total rejected ballots | | 94 | 0.69 |
| Turnout | | 13,639 | 79.48 |
| Electors on the lists | | 17,161 | – |

1939 Quebec general election
| Party | Candidate | Votes | % |
|---|---|---|---|
| Liberal | Edmond Guibord | 2,838 | 49.13 |
| Union Nationale | Romulus Ducharme | 2,499 | 43.27 |
| Action libérale nationale | Philippe Gravel | 439 | 7.60 |
| Total valid votes | | 5,776 | 99.33 |
| Total rejected ballots | | 45 | 0.77 |
| Turnout | | 5,821 | 72.78 |
| Electors on the lists | | 7,976 | – |

1936 Quebec general election
| Party | Candidate | Votes | % |
|---|---|---|---|
| Union Nationale | Romulus Ducharme | 4,059 | 64.98 |
| Liberal | Edmond Guibord | 2,188 | 35.02 |
| Total valid votes | | 6,247 | 99.71 |
| Total rejected ballots | | 18 | 0.29 |
| Turnout | | 6,265 | 79.21 |
| Electors on the lists | | 7,909 | – |

1935 Quebec general election
| Party | Candidate | Votes | % |
|---|---|---|---|
| Action libérale nationale | Romulus Ducharme | 3,497 | 61.00 |
| Liberal | Edmond Tremblay | 2,236 | 39.00 |
| Total valid votes | | 5,733 | 99.70 |
| Total rejected ballots | | 18 | 0.30 |
| Turnout | | 5,750 | 72.64 |
| Electors on the lists | | 7,916 | – |

1931 Quebec general election
| Party | Candidate | Votes | % |
|---|---|---|---|
| Liberal | Joseph-Alphida Crête | 3,010 | 56.11 |
| Conservative | Léovide Francoeur | 2,354 | 43.89 |
| Total valid votes | | 5,364 | 99.20 |
| Total rejected ballots | | 43 | 0.80 |
| Turnout | | 5,407 | 81.96 |
| Electors on the lists | | 6,597 | – |

== See also ==
- Grand-Mère
- History of Canada
- History of Quebec
- La Tuque, Quebec
- Mauricie
- Politics of Canada
- Politics of Quebec
- Saint-Maurice—Champlain
