= Edmond Guibord =

Canadian politician

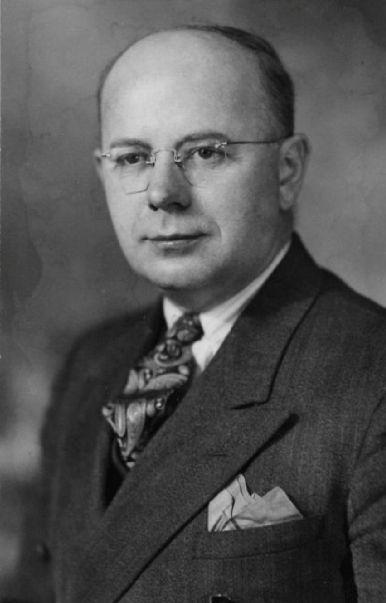

Member of the Legislative Assembly of Quebec for Laviolette
- In office 1939–1944
- Preceded by: Romulus Ducharme
- Succeeded by: Romulus Ducharme

Personal details
- Born: September 17, 1894 Montreal, Quebec
- Died: December 16, 1971 (aged 77) Saint-Lambert, Quebec
- Party: Liberal

Edmond Guibord (September 17, 1894 – December 16, 1971) was a politician in the Quebec, Canada. He served as Member of the Legislative Assembly.

== Early life ==
He was born on September 17, 1894, in Montreal.

== City Politics ==
He was mayor of Grand-Mère, Quebec from 1923 to 1930 and council member of the same city from 1937 to 1941.

== Federal Politics ==
He ran as a Liberal candidate in the federal district of Champlain in 1930 and lost.

== Provincial Politics ==
Guibord ran as a Liberal candidate to the Legislative Assembly of Quebec in the district of Laviolette in 1936 and lost. In 1939 though, he ran again and defeated Union Nationale incumbent Romulus Ducharme.

He did not run for re-election in 1944.

== Death ==
He died on December 16, 1971, in the Montreal area.
