= Jean-Pierre Jolivet =

Canadian politician (born 1941)

Jean-Pierre Jolivet (born August 23, 1941) was a politician in Quebec, Canada. He served as Cabinet Member and Member of the National Assembly of Quebec.

== Early life ==
He was born in 1941 in Montreal and grew up in the Mauricie area. He attended Séminaire Sainte-Marie and obtained an Education Degree from Université Laval. Prior to entering politics, Jolivet was a teacher and a union activist.

== Member of the legislature ==
Jolivet ran as a Parti Québécois (PQ) candidate in the 1973 and 1976 provincial elections in the district of Laviolette. He was elected on his second attempt and was re-elected in the 1981 election.

He served as Deputy Speaker from 1980 to 1984.

== Member of the Cabinet ==
Premier René Lévesque appointed him to the Cabinet in 1984. Jolivet served as Minister for Forestry from 1984 until the 1985 election.

== Official Opposition ==
Robert Bourassa's Liberals won the 1985 and 1989 elections by substantial margins. During that time, Jolivet remained the only PQ member to represent a district from the Mauricie area.

== Political rise ==
Jolivet was sent back to the legislature in the 1994 election with a majority of his PQ colleagues. He served as his party's House Whip from 1994 to 1997. Jolivet also served as House Leader, and as Minister for Electoral Reform, Regional Development and Forestry from 1997 to the 1998 election.

He was re-elected in 1998 and became Minister of Regions.

In March 2001 Jolivet retired from politics, after twenty-five years of service. Liberal Julie Boulet succeeded him as Member of the National Assembly.

== See also ==
- Laviolette Provincial Electoral District
- Mauricie
- Shawinigan

National Assembly of Quebec
Preceded by Prudent Carpentier (Liberal)	MNA, District of Laviolette; 1976–2001	Succeeded by Julie Boulet (Liberal)
