= Romulus Ducharme =

Canadian politician (1886–1976)

Charles Romulus Ducharme

ဗ of the Legislative Assembly of Quebec for Laviolette
- In office 1935–1939
- Preceded by: Joseph-Alphida Crête
- Succeeded by: Edmond Guibord
- In office 1944–1966
- Preceded by: Edmond Guibord
- Succeeded by: André Leduc

Personal details
- Born: November 4, 1886 Sainte-Élisabeth, near Berthierville, Quebec
- Died: February 15, 1976 (aged 89) La Tuque, Quebec
- Party: Action libérale nationale Union Nationale

Charles Romulus Ducharme (November 4, 1886 – February 15, 1976) was a politician in Quebec, Canada and an eight-term Member of the Legislative Assembly of Quebec (MLA).

== Early life ==
He was born on November 4, 1886, near Berthierville in Lanaudière. He opened a law practice in La Tuque in the Mauricie area.

== Federal politics ==
Ducharme ran as a Conservative candidate in the district of Portneuf in the 1921 and 1925 federal elections, but each time lost to Liberal Party of Canada incumbent Michel-Siméon Delisle.

== Member of the legislature ==
He ran as an Action libérale nationale candidate in the district of Laviolette in the 1935 provincial election and defeated Liberal Party of Quebec incumbent Joseph-Alphida Crête. He became a member of the Union Nationale and was re-elected as such in the 1936 election.

He lost the 1939 election to Liberal Edmond Guibord.

However, he won his seat back in the 1944 election and won every subsequent election in 1948, 1952, 1956, 1960 and 1962.

He served as Parliamentary Assistant to the Minister of Municipal Affairs from 1956 to 1960.

Ducharme did not run for re-election in the 1966 election.

== Death ==
He died on February 15, 1976, in La Tuque.

== Honours ==
- Boulevard Ducharme, a section of Route 155 in La Tuque, was named to honour him.
- Pont Couvert Ducharme, one of the two covered bridges in La Bostonnais was named after him.

== See also ==
- La Tuque, Quebec
- Laviolette Provincial Electoral District
- Mauricie
