= Quebec Route 352 =

Highway in Quebec, Canada

Route 352

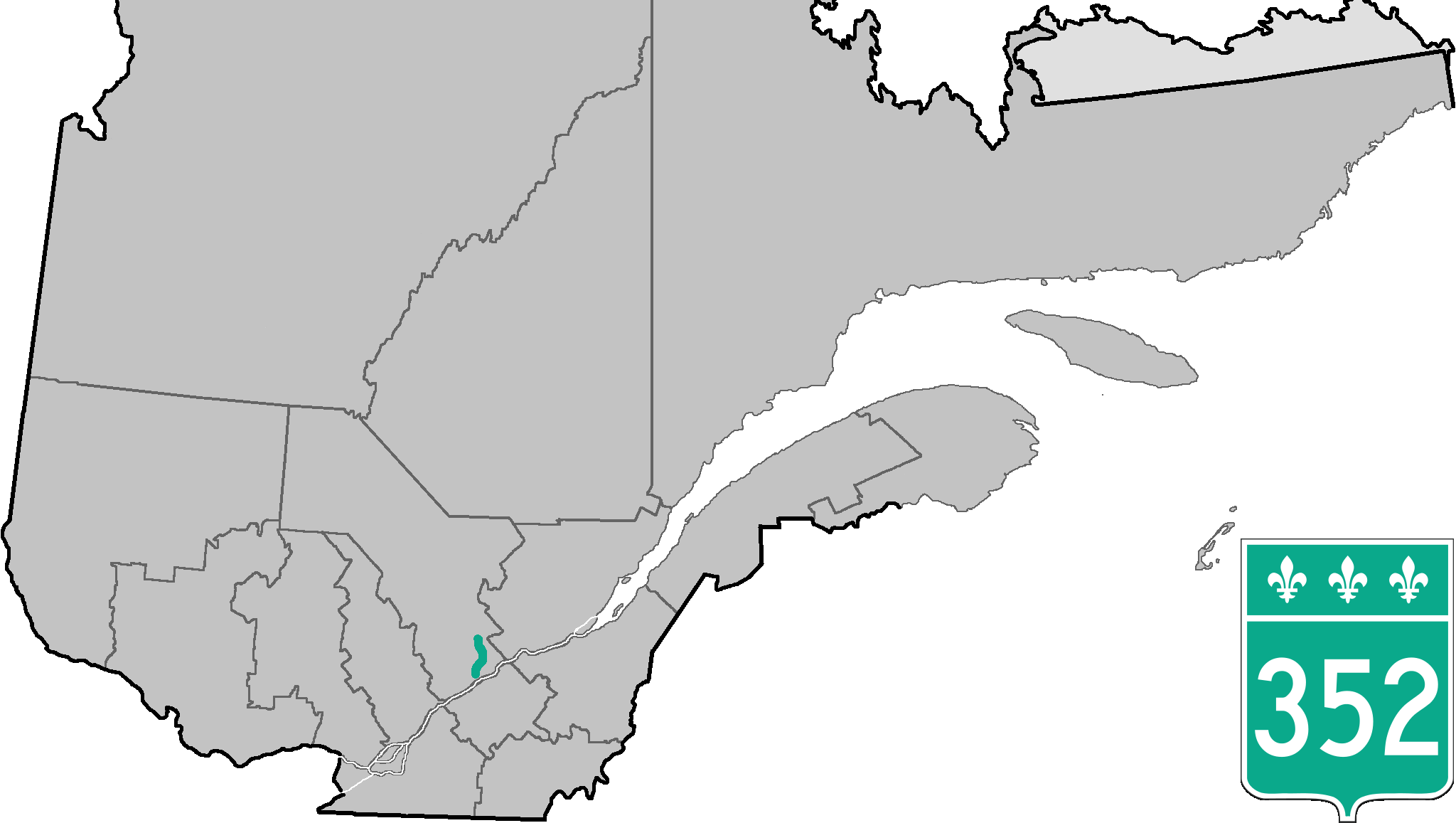

Route information
- Maintained by Transports Québec and Municipalities of Saint-Narcisse, Saint-Stanislas, Saint-Adelphe and Sainte-Thècle.
- Length: 55.4 km (34.4 mi)

Major junctions
- West end: A-40 in Trois-Rivières
- R-159 in Saint-Stanislas
- East end: R-153 in Sainte-Thecle

Location
- Country: Canada
- Province: Quebec

Highway system
- Quebec provincial highways; Autoroutes; List; Former
← R-351	→ R-354

Route 352 is a 55 km east–west provincial road in the Mauricie region in Quebec, Canada. It goes north from Saint-Maurice (exit 210 of autoroute 40) to Sainte-Thècle.

It goes through the villages of St-Maurice, Saint-Narcisse, Saint-Stanislas, Saint-Adelphe, and then Sainte-Thècle.

From the Saint-Narcisse-Saint-Stanislas border, it follows the Batiscan River to past Saint-Adelphe.

== Municipalities along Route 352 ==
- Trois-Rivières
- Saint-Maurice
- Saint-Luc-de-Vincennes
- Saint-Narcisse
- Saint-Stanislas
- Saint-Adelphe
- Sainte-Thècle

== Major intersections ==
RCM or ET	Municipality	Km	Road	Notes
Trois-Rivières	Trois-Rivières	0.0	A-40	Exit 210 (A-40)
Les Chenaux	Saint-Luc-de-Vincennes	13.1	R-359	Western terminus of Route 352 / Route 359 overlap
Les Chenaux	Saint-Narcisse	17.1	R-359	Eastern terminus of Route 352 / Route 359 overlap
Les Chenaux	Saint-Narcisse	20.2	R-361	Northern terminus of Route 361
Les Chenaux	Saint-Stanislas	29.5	R-159	Western terminus of Route 159 / Route 352 overlap
Les Chenaux	Saint-Stanislas	30.3	R-159	Eastern terminus of Route 159 / Route 352 overlap
Mékinac	Saint-Adelphe	44.1	Rue du Moulin	To Saint-Adelphe
Mékinac	Saint-Adelphe	47	Rang Saint-Émile	To Saint-Tite
Mékinac	Saint-Thècle	55.4	R-153	

== See also ==
- List of Quebec provincial highways
