= Saint-Tite =

- City
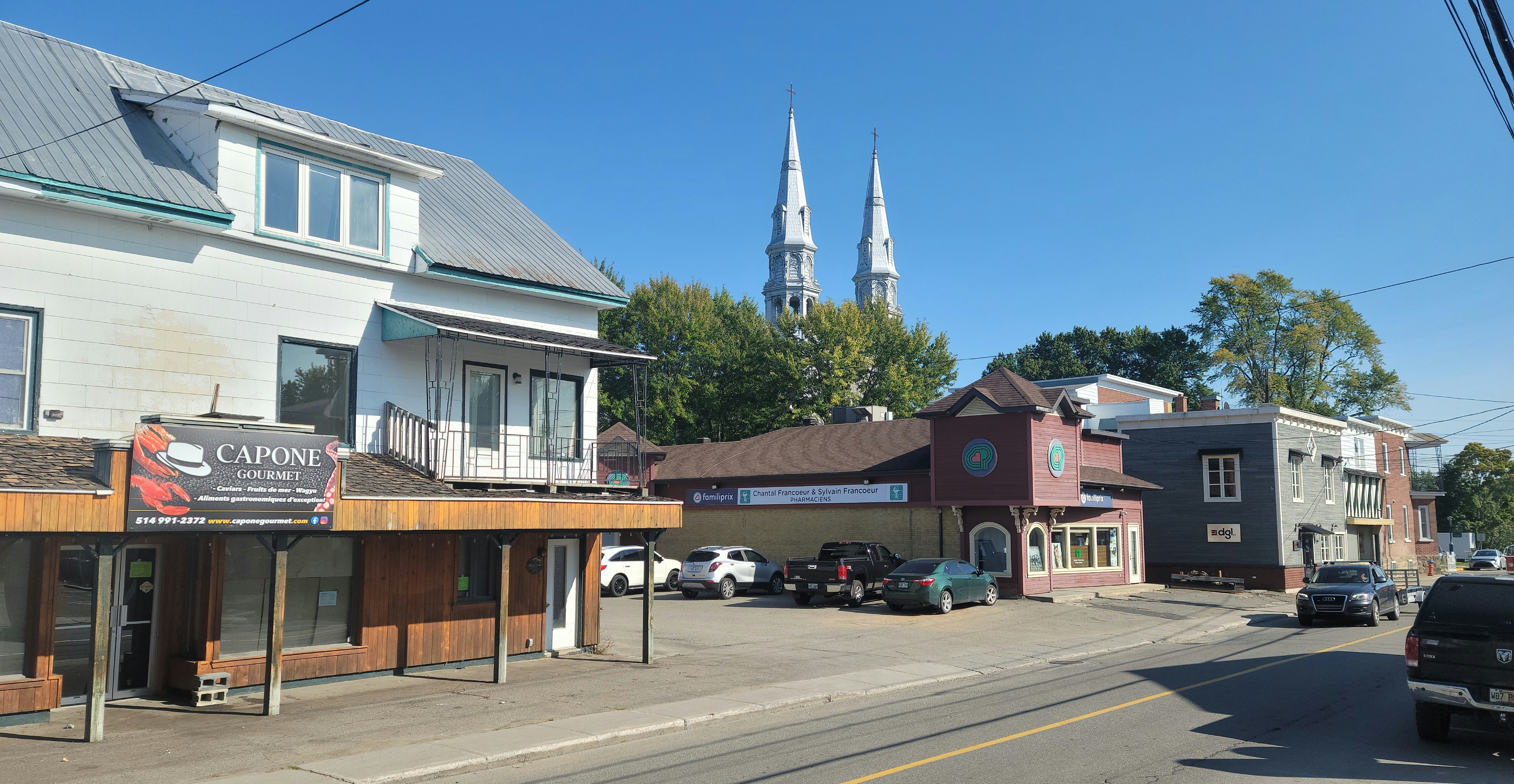

- Coat of arms
- Motto: L'union dans l'action
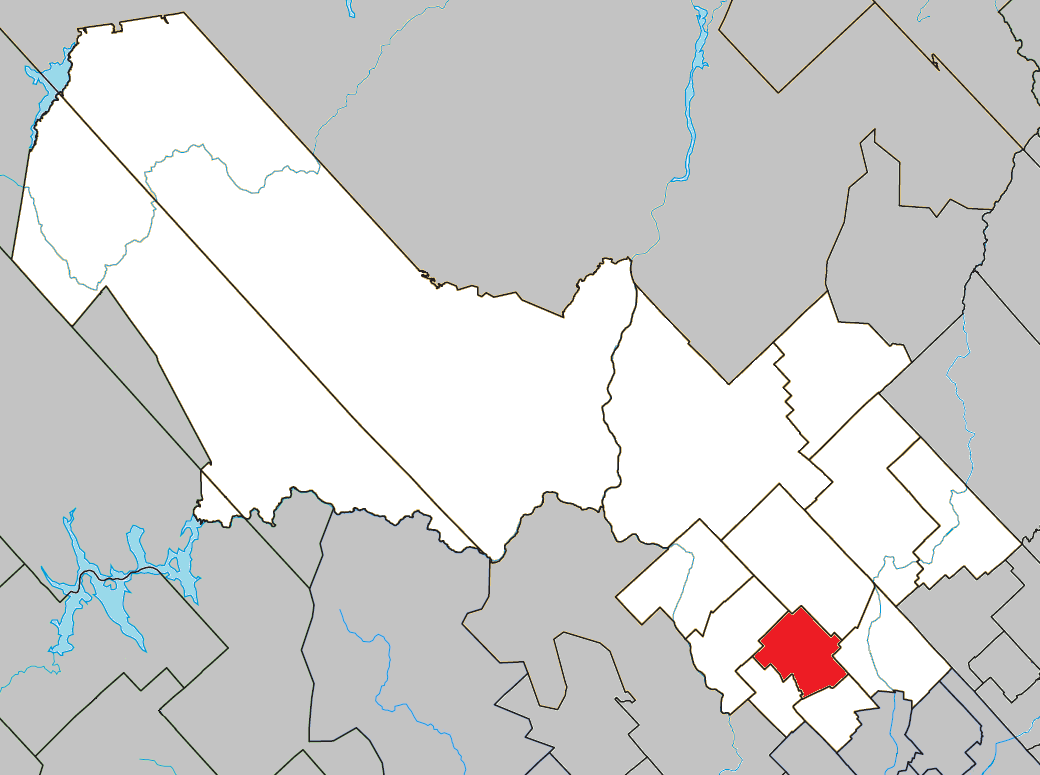
- Location within Mékinac RCM.

- Location in central Quebec
- Coordinates: 46°44′N 72°34′W
- Country: Canada
- Province: Quebec
- Region: Mauricie
- RCM: Mékinac
- Settled: 1830s
- Constituted: December 23, 1998

Government
  - Mayor: Jean Goulet
  - Fed. riding: Saint-Maurice—Champlain
  - Prov. riding: Laviolette

Area
  - Total: 93.13 km^{2} (35.96 sq mi)
  - Land: 91.10 km^{2} (35.17 sq mi)

Population (2021)
  - Total: 3,672
  - Density: 40.3/km^{2} (104/sq mi)
  - Change 2016-21: 0.0%
  - Dwellings: 2,271
- Time zone: UTC−5 (EST)
  - Summer (DST): UTC−4 (EDT)
- Postal code(s): G0X 3H0
- Area codes: 418 and 581
- Highways: R-153 R-159
- Website: www.villest-tite.com

Saint-Tite (French pronunciation: [sɛ̃ tit]) is a Canadian city located at the foothills of the Laurentians, between Grandes-Piles and Saint-Adelphe, in the Mauricie RCM of Mékinac. A large body of water, Lake Pierre-Paul, bathes the northeastern part of the territory.'

The name of the parish of Saint-Tite is attested in 1859 and was established thanks to the canonical and civil election that occurred in 1863 following its detachment from Sainte-Anne-de-la-Pérade and Saint-Stanislas de-la-Rivière-des-Envies. The post office, opened in 1859, and the parish municipality, established in 1863, took over the parish name that celebrates Saint Titus, a companion of St. Paul the Apostle, who converted him in the first century by entrusting him with the task of organizing the Church of Ephesus.

== History ==
The first real inhabitants of the area were Indigenous peoples of the Americas – Algonquins, Innu and Métis – who lived near Lake Kapibouska. Indigenous peoples of the Americas. The small settlement of Saint-Juste-de Kapibouska took the name of Saint-Tite at the end of the 1850s. Small Indigenous and Métis communities lived in makeshift camps whose permanence or duration depended on the availability of hunting, fishing, the quality of the soil to be cultivated, as many also did some gardening, and the fur trade. All French attempts to settle the Algonquins had failed.

Mission. The Saint-Juste de Kapibouska mission was set up for the Aboriginal people living at Kapibouska Lake. At the beginning of the 19th century, missionaries visited the territory.

Pioneers. In the early 1830s, lumber yards were booming on the Rivière des Envies. The first settler of French-Canadian origin settled around 1833 in the area of the future city of Saint-Tite. Over time, several other pioneers were established.

Apart from the missionaries' visits, the settlers had to travel several kilometers to reach the church of St. Stanislaus. The first chapel-presbytery was built in the 1850s. The first resident priest arrived in 1859.

Easter water. From the beginning of colonization, it is likely that gathering Easter water was a common practice among members of the Christian community. In 1995, the first organized harvest and the blessing of Easter water took place at the Curé Boutet spring. The faithful get their feet wet, get dirty with mud, some fall on patches of ice. Safety and accessibility are the reasons for the construction of temporary sets. Today, throughout Quebec, this practice has become increasingly rare, becoming a social gathering or even a tourist activity.

On Easter Sunday, we will have the celebration of Easter water at 4:30 a.m. before sunrise at the Curé spring at the end of Rue du Couvent. Afterwards, we will gather as a big family for a fraternal lunch at the Seniors' Club room around 5:30 am (Breakfast with baked beans, maple syrup and bread rolls, served by members of the Pastoral Council, free of charge).
Source: The parish leaflet of the Christian community of the parish of Saint-Tite, April 12, 1998.

Railway Fever 1878: The vast territory north of the St. Lawrence Plain, with its opening onto the immensity of the Canadian Shield, evokes grandiose dreams. In 1878, St. Laurence, Lower Laurentian & Saguenay obtained permission to build a track between Trois-Rivières and Saguenay-Lac-Saint-Jean via Saint-Tite.

Note: Kapibouska: of Algonquian origin, this name means "place of camp where there are reeds", kapi, "place of camp", baska or bouska "rushes", "reeds".

=== Coat of arms ===
The coat of arms of the city was adopted in 1954 by the city council.

The coat of arms of Saint-Tite is blazoned thus: Greek cross gules a chief azure point, flanked by a toothed wheel segment money dexter and a gear segment sinister gold, containing a skin tight leather gold dextral and sinistral spruce money, overcoming mountains of sand placed on a terrace or charged with a blue river.

== Geography ==
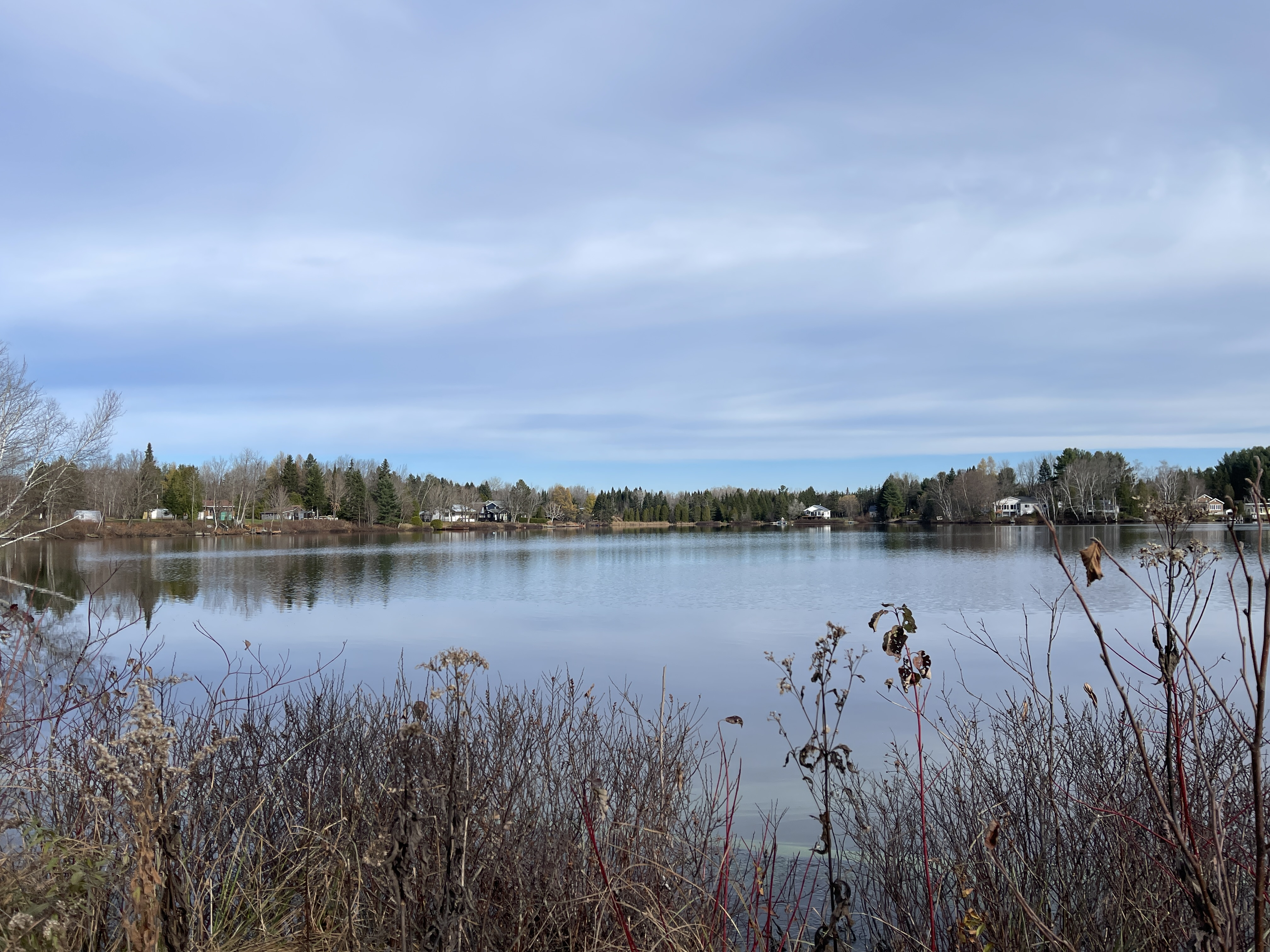
Lake Pierre-Paul, Chemin de l'Ìle

The city is crossed by the Rivière des Envies, a tributary of the Batiscan River. Rivière des Envies has its source at Lake Traverse in Sainte-Thècle and enters at the northern part (in "Grand marais" sector) of the territory of Saint-Tite. It crosses the municipality through the city, then heads to Proulxville.

== Demographics ==
In the 2021 Census of Population conducted by Statistics Canada, Saint-Tite had a population of 3,672 living in 1,915 of its 2,271 total private dwellings, a change of −0% from its 2016 population of 3,673. With a land area of 91.1 km^{2} (35.2 sq mi), it had a population density of 40.3/km^{2} (104.4/sq mi) in 2021.

Canada census – Saint-Tite community profile

	2021	2016	2011
Population	3,672 (0.0% from 2016)	3,673 (-5.3% from 2011)	3,880 (+1.4% from 2006)
Land area	91.10 km^{2} (35.17 sq mi)	91.33 km^{2} (35.26 sq mi)	92.53 km^{2} (35.73 sq mi)
Population density	40.3/km^{2} (104/sq mi)	40.2/km^{2} (104/sq mi)	41.9/km^{2} (109/sq mi)
Median age	57.6 (M: 56.0, F: 59.2)	55.8 (M: 51.1, F: 53.5)	52.4 (M: 46.7, F: 46.1)
Private dwellings	2,271 (total) 1,915 (occupied)	2,182 (total)	2,155 (total)
Median household income	$50,400	$43,162	$46,360

References: 2021 2016 2011

Historical Census Data - Saint-Tite, Quebec

Year	Pop.	±%
1911	1,438	—
1921	1,783	+24.0%
1931	1,969	+10.4%
1941	2,385	+21.1%
1951	2,856	+19.7%
1956	3,183	+11.4%
1961	3,250	+2.1%

Year	Pop.	±%
1966	3,113	−4.2%
1971	3,130	+0.5%
1976	3,128	−0.1%
1981	3,042	−2.7%
1986	2,831	−6.9%
1991	2,654	−6.3%
1996	2,555	−3.7%

Year	Pop.	±%
2001	3,845	+50.5%
2006	3,826	−0.5%
2011	3,880	+1.4%
2016	3,673	−5.3%
2021	3,672	−0.0%

Source: Statistics Canada

According to the 2021 census:

- Less than 1% of the population is immigrant.
- 24% of the population over 15 years has no diploma.
- 10% of the population over 15 years has a degree of higher education.
- 59.6% of the population of Saint-Tite is urban. The urban area of Saint-Tite has a population of 2,190 and an area of 2.69 km^{2} in 2021, or a density of 814.6 inhabitants/km^{2}.
- Private dwellings occupied by usual residents in 2021: 1,915 (total dwellings: 2,271)

Mother language (2021):

- 17.4% of the population masters both official languages of Canada.
- French as first language: 98.5%
- English as first language: 0.6%
- English and French as first language: 0.4%
- Other as first language: 0.4%

== Arts and culture ==
The city of Saint-Tite is particularly known for the Festival Western de Saint-Tite, which takes place for 10 days in September every year. The Festival Western de Saint-Tite was developed from a rodeo inaugurated in 1967 to promote the leather industry. The Festival Western de Saint-Tite is the largest Western attraction in Eastern Canada. This festival of Eastern style, under the epithet Western, has an international reputation. The festival's success has led to the remodeling of some of the town's infrastructures to resemble a western frontier town of the late nineteenth or early twentieth centuries. Since 1999, the Rodeo of Festival Western de Saint-Tite is awarded as the "Best outdoor rodeo in Americas". The festival features a variety of activities that take place at a rate of horsemen and the sound of country music and in Eastern decor: competition, conference, parade, tasting, demonstrations, exhibitions, shows, etc... The horsemen and women can participate in various tests of skill on horseback or on wild bull (with or without a saddle). They can participate in speed events, such as steer roping, or skill tests, such as barrel racing. During the 10 days of the Festival, several events take place in the various marquees erected around the city or at the Country Club Desjardins, a site that looks like a typical western town. The festival is marked by a country western character. The "Galaxie Rising Star Award" awarded at the Festival contributes to the development of musical talent in the country western area.

Saint-Tite is an important part of the novel Les Filles de Caleb (Caleb's daughters), written by novelist Arlette Cousture. The backstory of this novel is based on the life of Émilie Bordeleau, a country school teacher who taught and lived with her children in schools in the area.

== Infrastructure ==
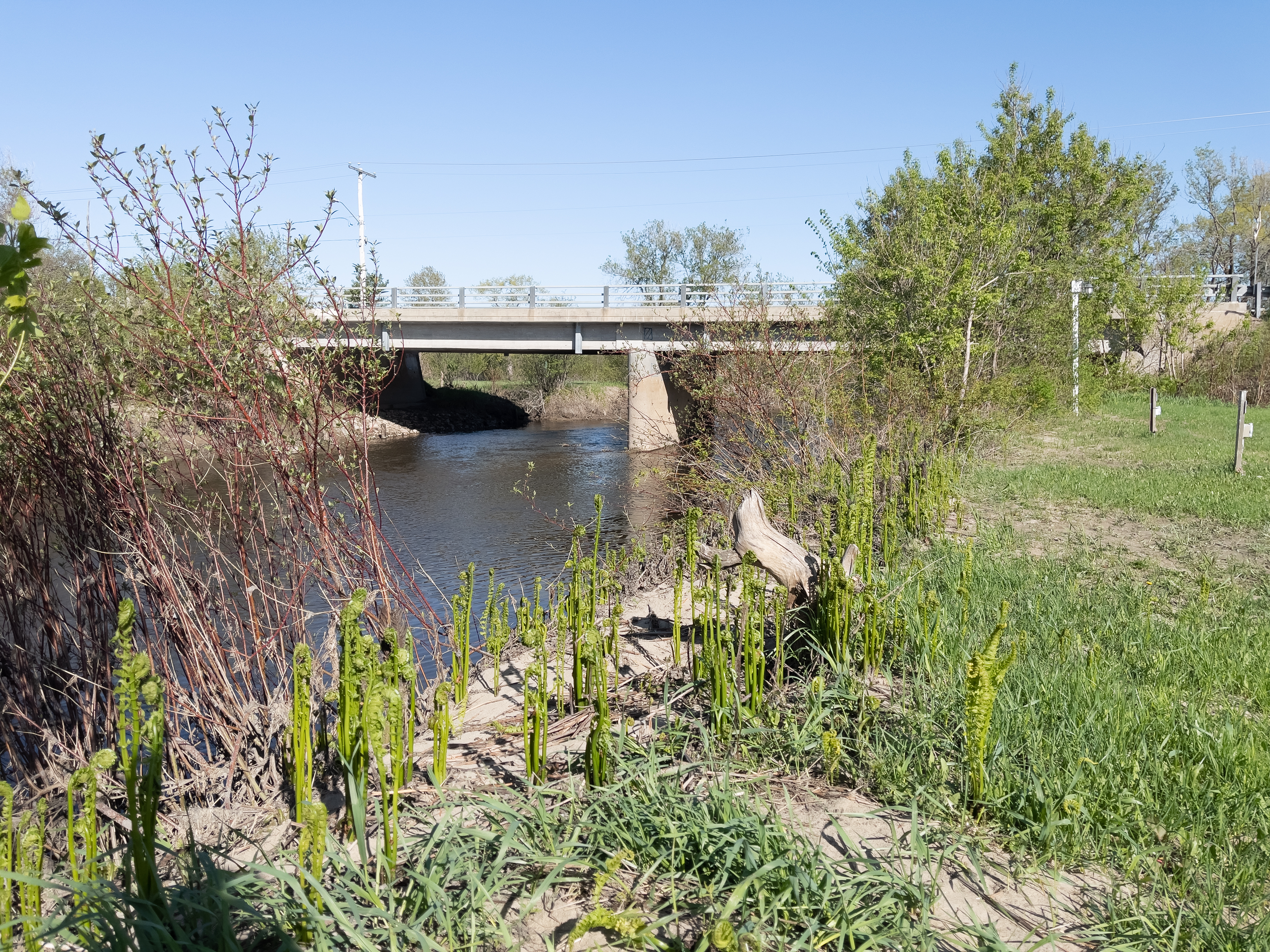
Envies River, Reinforced concrete girder bridge P-03956, on Le Bourdais Street, (Route 153)

Highway 153 connects Saint-Tite to Shawinigan and Lac-aux-Sables, and Highway 159 to Saint-Roch-de-Mékinac and Sainte-Anne-de-la-Pérade. Saint-Tite is also served by the Via Rail Canada passenger train service, the Saint-Tite station (station platform) is at 310 Marchildon Street.

== Notable people ==
- Julie Boulet, politician, member of the Liberal Party of Quebec.
- Gratien Gélinas (1909-1999), playwright and actor.
- Joseph-Alfred Mongrain, politician in the Canadian parliament

== See also ==
- Batiscanie, Quebec
- Pierre-Paul River
- North Mékinac River
- Lake Roberge (Grandes-Piles)
