= Festival Western de Saint-Tite =

Festival in Mauricie (Quebec, Canada)

Festival Western de Saint-Tite Saint-Tite Western Festival
- Genre: Music festival, country music, rodeo, parade
- Begins: 1967
- Locations: Saint-Tite, Quebec, Canada
- Coordinates: 46.7297°N 72.5623°W
- Website: Festival Western

The Festival Western de Saint-Tite is a major annual event held in September, in Saint-Tite, Quebec, Canada.

Voted "Best Outdoor Rodeo in North America" since 1999, Saint-Tite's festival attracts around 600,000 visitors every year.

It developed from a rodeo inaugurated in 1967 to promote the leather industry. It hosts a major rodeo competition, along with other cultural events.

During the two weeks of competition, the entire town shuts down to accommodate spectators.

== History ==
In 1967, a Saint-Tite company specializing in leather work organized a rodeo as a marketing operation on a local sports ground. The event hosts nearly 6,000 visitors and due to its success, quickly formed several committees to repeat the experience in subsequent years. The active and voluntary participation of citizens is the basis of the event and contributes to the containerization of the company. Efforts are being made to introduce a professional rodeo and equestrian competitions. In 1968, the parade with animal traction made its appearance. Over the years, several activities have been added to the festival, always around a Western theme.

In 1972, large wooden stands were inaugurated for the spectators of the rodeo.

Over the years, the city of Saint-Tite, the festival organization, the city's businesses and citizens have gradually changed the look of the infrastructure to make the city look like a Wild West village.

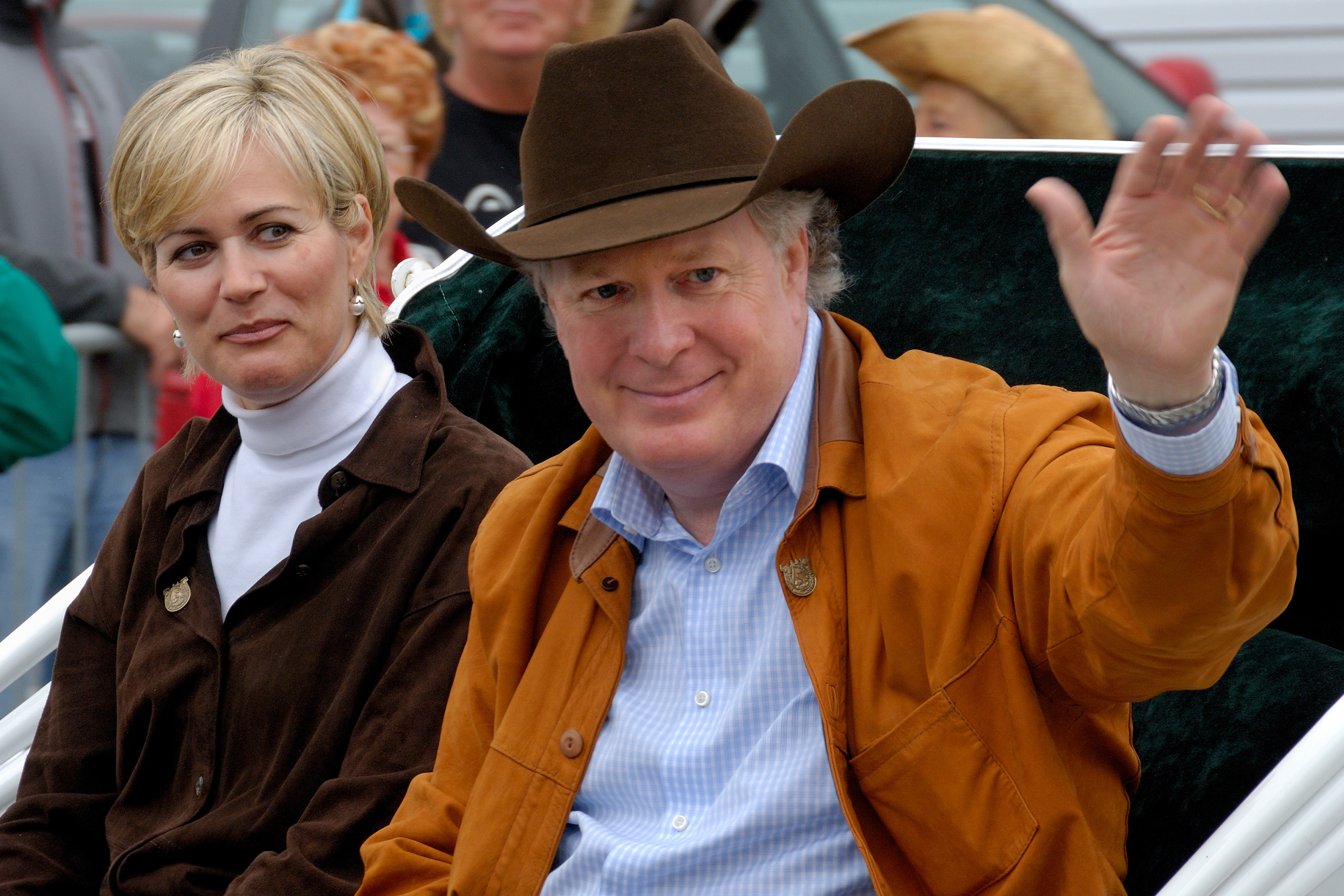
Jean Charest, former premier of Quebec, and his wife, Michèle Dionne, on 7 September 2008.

Some of the changes are as follows:

A fountain, near the church, is topped by a sculpture depicting a cowboy riding a wild horse.

A western-style four-sided clock is installed at the main intersection of the city.

Road signs indicating the street names have been modified to make them look western.

The shops often have a permanent exterior decoration to the western style. While some have completely changed the outside of their business, most are content to have stylized the name of their business.

Households can participate each year in a decoration contest from outside their home. While most citizens install fences, poles and colored lights, some create articulated decorations with electric motors or cover their entire terrain with western-style objects.

In 1999, the wooden platforms were demolished to make way for new steel platforms with a capacity of 7,243.

The Saint-Tite Western Festival is a non-profit organization whose mission is to produce professional rodeos and activities designed to recreate a country-western atmosphere. While promoting an incomparable atmosphere, the event aims to maximize major socio-economic and tourist benefits within the city of Saint-Tite, the MRC Mékinac and throughout the Mauricie region. All this to obtain a radiation at the international level.

The Western Festival of Saint-Tite is a professional rodeo in Eastern North America. The organization's development involves the work of many individuals within the region and community.

The Organization's vision is to set the standard for producing rodeos and country-western activities in Eastern North America.

In 2008, the festival attracted 585,581 visitors, including 100,000 for the horse-drawn parade.

== Accusations and Lawsuits ==
Since 2017, there have been several allegations of animal mistreatment at the rodeo of the Festival Western de Saint-Tite, including the death of a horse in 2017 and the death of a calf in 2024.

In 2017, law professor Me Alain Roy of the Université de Montréal’s Faculty of Law filed an injunction request against the Festival Western de Saint-Tite before the Superior Court of Québec, which authorized him to document the treatment of animals used during rodeos. In his 690‑page report, the team analyzes 135 hours of video footage recorded across 20 rodeos, including activities such as bronc and bull riding, steer wrestling, calf roping, and barrel racing.

In 2022, the organization Communauté Droit animalier Québec (DAQ) filed an injunction request to prohibit certain rodeo events, notably calf roping and steer wrestling. In the calf‑roping event, cowboys must catch the calf and tie three of its legs together as quickly as possible. In the steer‑wrestling event, they throw the steer to the ground by twisting its neck. According to the organization, these activities cause distress, anxiety, acute pain, and excessive suffering to the animals.

== Prizes and distinctions ==
- 2019 : Autorisé à vous divertir, prize given out by SOCAN.

== See also ==
- Mékinac Regional County Municipality, Mauricie
- Festivals in Quebec
- Carnaval, Quebec's most famous festival
- Calgary Stampede, western Canada's largest rodeo
- Raymond Stampede, Canada's oldest rodeo
- Canadian Finals Rodeo
- Montréal, 190 km (120 mi) away
- Quebec City, 130 km (81 mi) away
- Trois-Rivières, 60 km (37 mi) away
