= Grand-Mère =

- Shawinigan
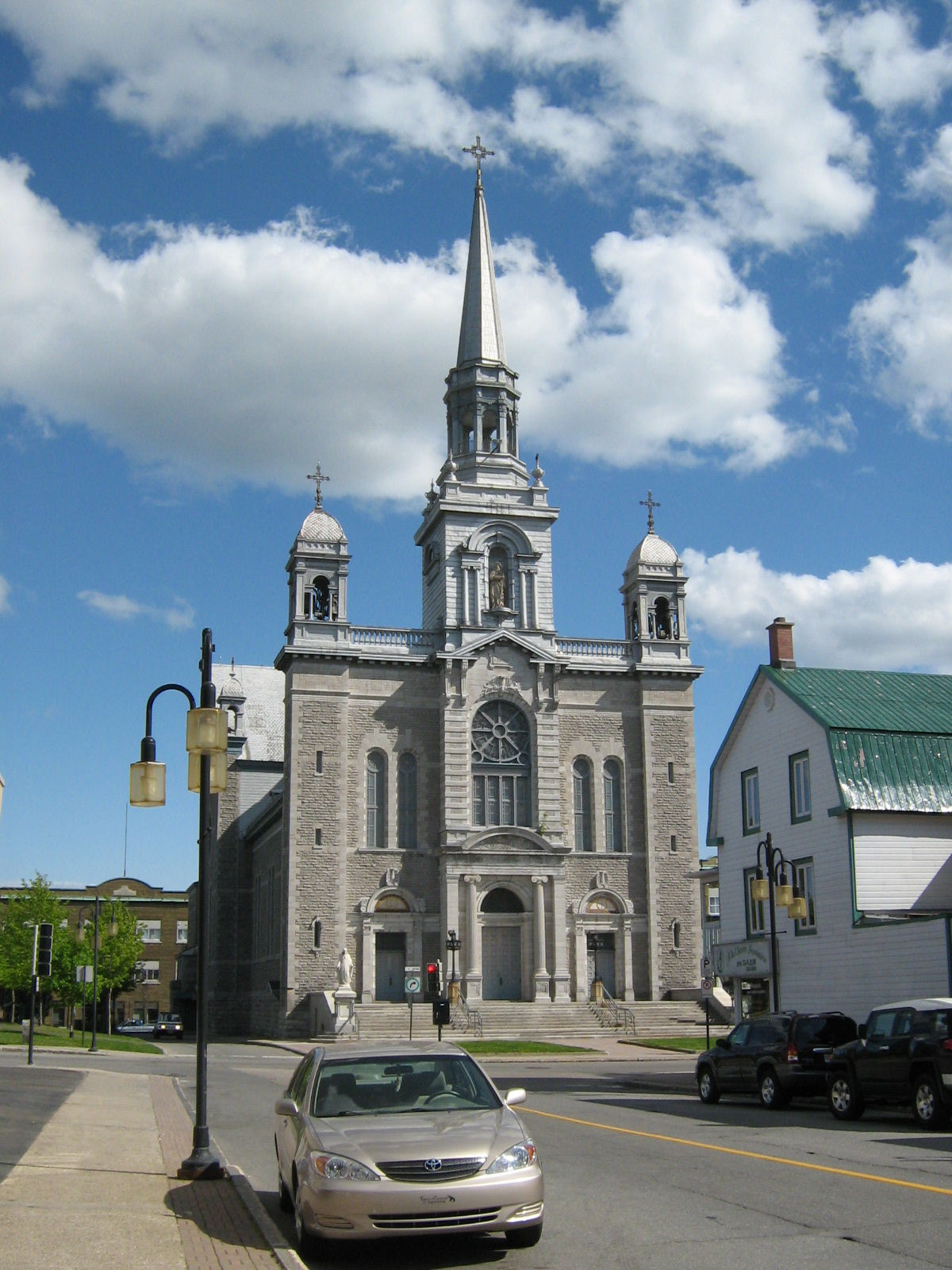
- Saint-Paul church in Grand-Mère
- Interactive map of Grand-Mère
- Coordinates: 46°37′0″N 72°42′00″W
- Country: Canada
- Province: Quebec
- Region: Shawinigan
- Founded: 1898
- Merged: January 1, 2002
- Electoral Districts Federal: Champlain
- Provincial: Laviolette

Government
  - Type: Borough
  - Mayor: Michel Angers
  - Federal MP(s): François-Philippe Champagne (LPC)
  - Quebec MNA(s): Marie-Louise Tardif (Independent)

Area
  - Land: 62.95 km^{2} (24.31 sq mi)

Population (2001)
  - Total: 13,179
  - Density: 209.4/km^{2} (542/sq mi)
  - Dwellings: 6,710
- Time zone: UTC-5 (EST)
  - Summer (DST): UTC-4 (EDT)
- Area code: 819
- Access Routes A-55: R-155; R-153
- Website: http://www.shawinigan.ca

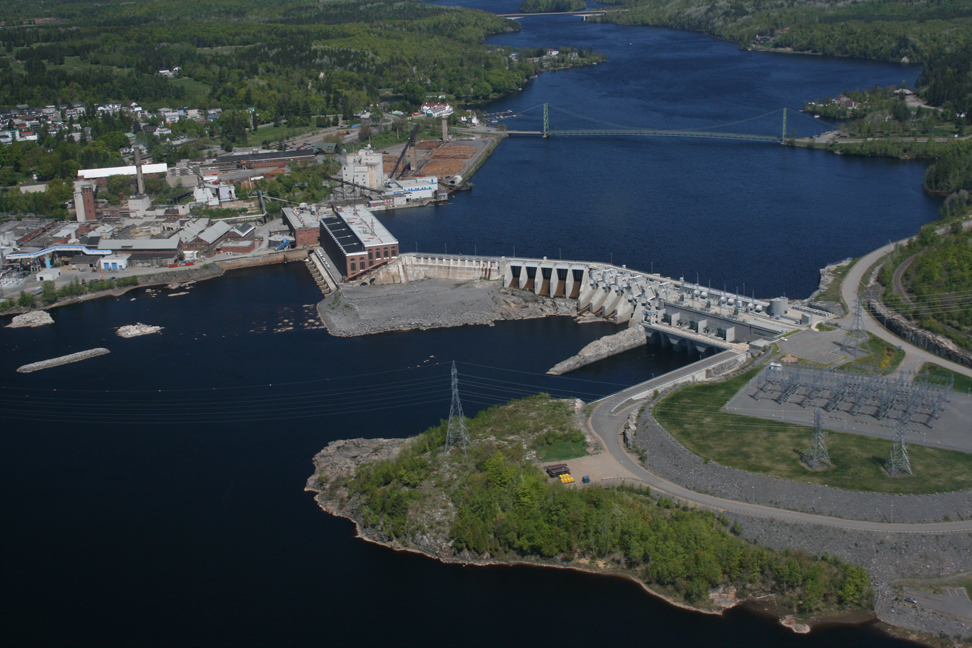
Bridge & Hydro-Quebec's dam in Grand-Mère

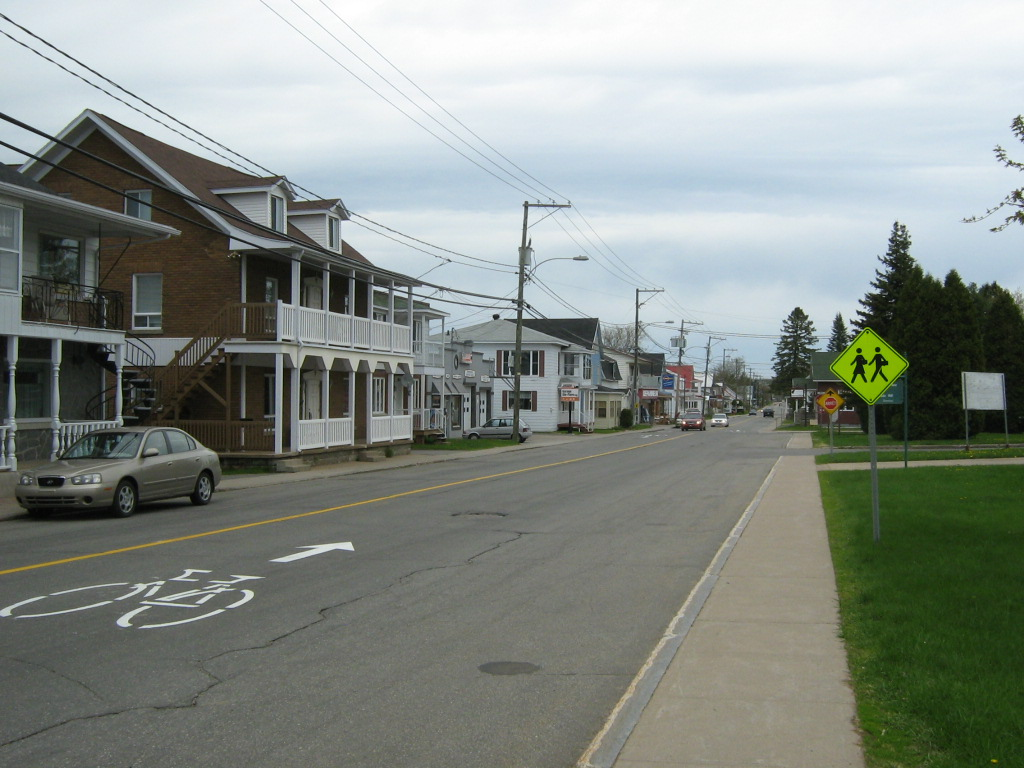
50e Avenue in Sainte-Flore. Sainte-Flore was a separate parish municipality until 1970 when it was amalgamated into Grand-Mère.

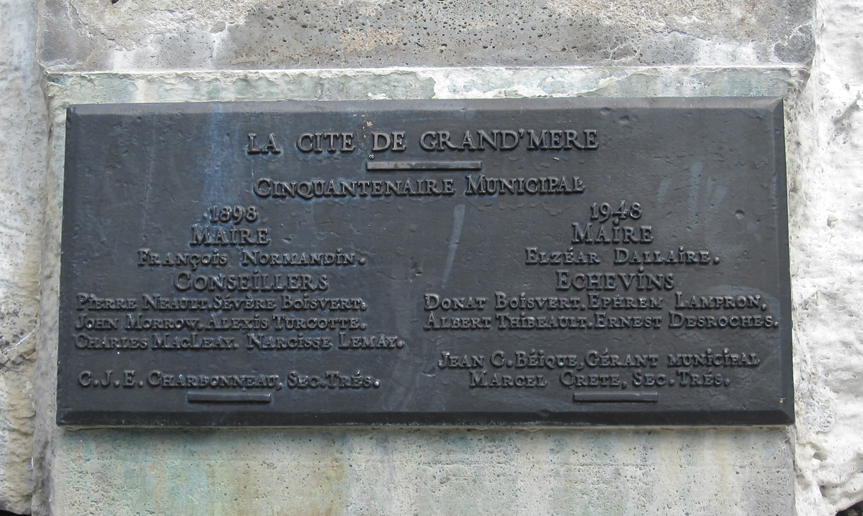
A plaque commemorating the 50th anniversary of Grand-Mère attached to the "old woman" rock

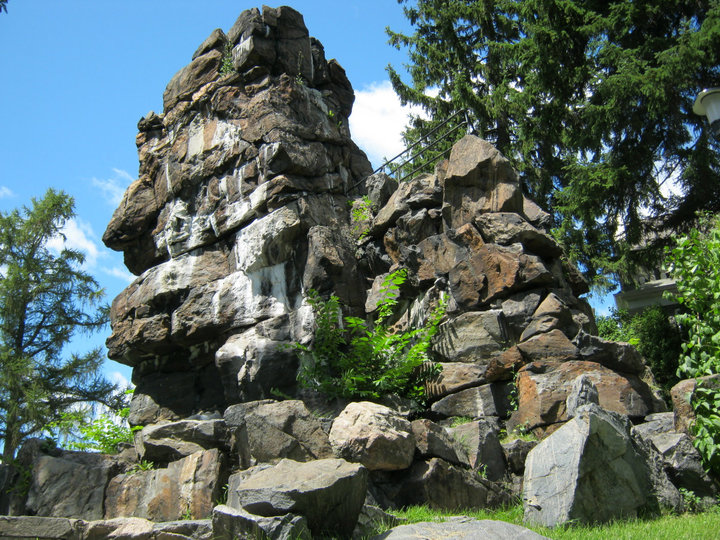
The Grand-Mère rock

Grand-Mère (French: [ɡʁɑ̃ mɛʁ], Quebec French: [ɡɾɑ̃ maɛ̯ɾ]) is a settlement and former municipality in central Quebec, Canada on the Saint-Maurice River. As a result of the municipal reorganization in Quebec which took effect at the beginning of 2002, Grand-Mère now forms part of the City of Shawinigan. The population in 2001 was 13,179.

== History ==
Grand-Mère was founded in 1898. Like some of its neighbouring towns, it owes its economic origins to the St-Maurice river on which it is located. A major hydroelectric dam that was built on the river in 1916 was one of the oldest and largest Hydro-Québec generating stations. The dam was replaced by a larger dam in 2004. The abundance of relatively inexpensive electricity led to the development of industry, primarily based on the production of paper. Logs which were used for the paper pulp were floated downstream on the St-Maurice to the paper mill from more northerly areas. The mill, which has changed ownership over the decades, has had a lasting impact on the town, from the creation of its award-winning golf course to the construction of several of the town's historic buildings.

The surrounding area consists of forested hills, lakes, and flat plains and farms, with much glacial activity still evident. The Mauricie region in which Grand-Mère is located has been struggling economically for decades, and boasts some of the most inexpensive real estate in Canada.

The name of the town comes from a rock formation that resembles an old woman with a hair bun at the base of her head ("grand-mère" is French for grandmother). The formation formerly stood in the rapids of the Saint-Maurice River adjacent to the town. When the hydroelectric dam was built, the formation was moved in 1916 and rebuilt. It is now in a small park overlooking the St-Maurice River, at the corner of 4e and 5e Avenues.

The area's biggest attraction is La Mauricie National Park.

== Education ==
There are five public schools. All of them are affiliated to the Commission scolaire de l'Énergie school board.

School	Level	Location	Number of Students
Antoine-Hallé	Elementary	1001, 8^{e} Rue	217
École de Sainte-Flore (Saint Flora's)	Elementary	3351, 33^{e} Rue	148
École secondaire du Rocher	Secondary	300, 7^{e} Rue	923
Laflèche	Elementary	153, 1321, 5^{e} Avenue	261
Saint-Paul (Saint Paul)	Elementary	461, 16^{e} Avenue	133

== Mayors ==
From 1898 to 2001, Grand-Mère had its own mayor and its own city council. The mayors were:

#	Mayor	Taking Office	Leaving
1	François Normandin	1898	1898
2	T. Desaulniers	1898	1900
3	A. Turcotte	1900	1901
4	F.-X. Gingras	1901	1902
5	A. Roy	1902	1903
6	A. Tremblay	1903	1905
7	J. Desaulniers	1905	1908
8	J.-A. Robert	1908	1910
9	Pierre-Calixte Neault	1910	1916
10	Dr. G.-A. Ferron	1916	1919
9	Pierre-Calixte Neault	1919	1920
11	J.-P. Lalonde	1920	1923
12	Dr. J.-Edmond Guibord	1923	1930
13	L. Trépanier	1931	1931
14	J.-Alfred Gagnon	1931	1935
15	Dr. Joseph Onésime Honorius Ricard	1935	1939
14	J.-Alfred Gagnon	1939	1943
16	Elzéar Dallaire	1943	1951
17	A. Thibeault	1951	1953
18	J.-E.-A. Matteau	1953	1957
19	Joseph-Alfred Therrien	1957	1965
20	H. Prud’Homme	1965	1970
21	Jean-Marie Lafontaine	1970	1982
22	Jacques Marchand	1982	1994
23	Gérald Bastarache	1994	1998
24	Linda Lafrenière	1998	2001

== Transportation ==
Grand-Mère is served by the Montreal–Jonquière train and the Montreal–Senneterre train.

== See also ==
- List of former cities in Quebec
- Shawinigate
