= Saint-Adelphe =

- Parish municipality
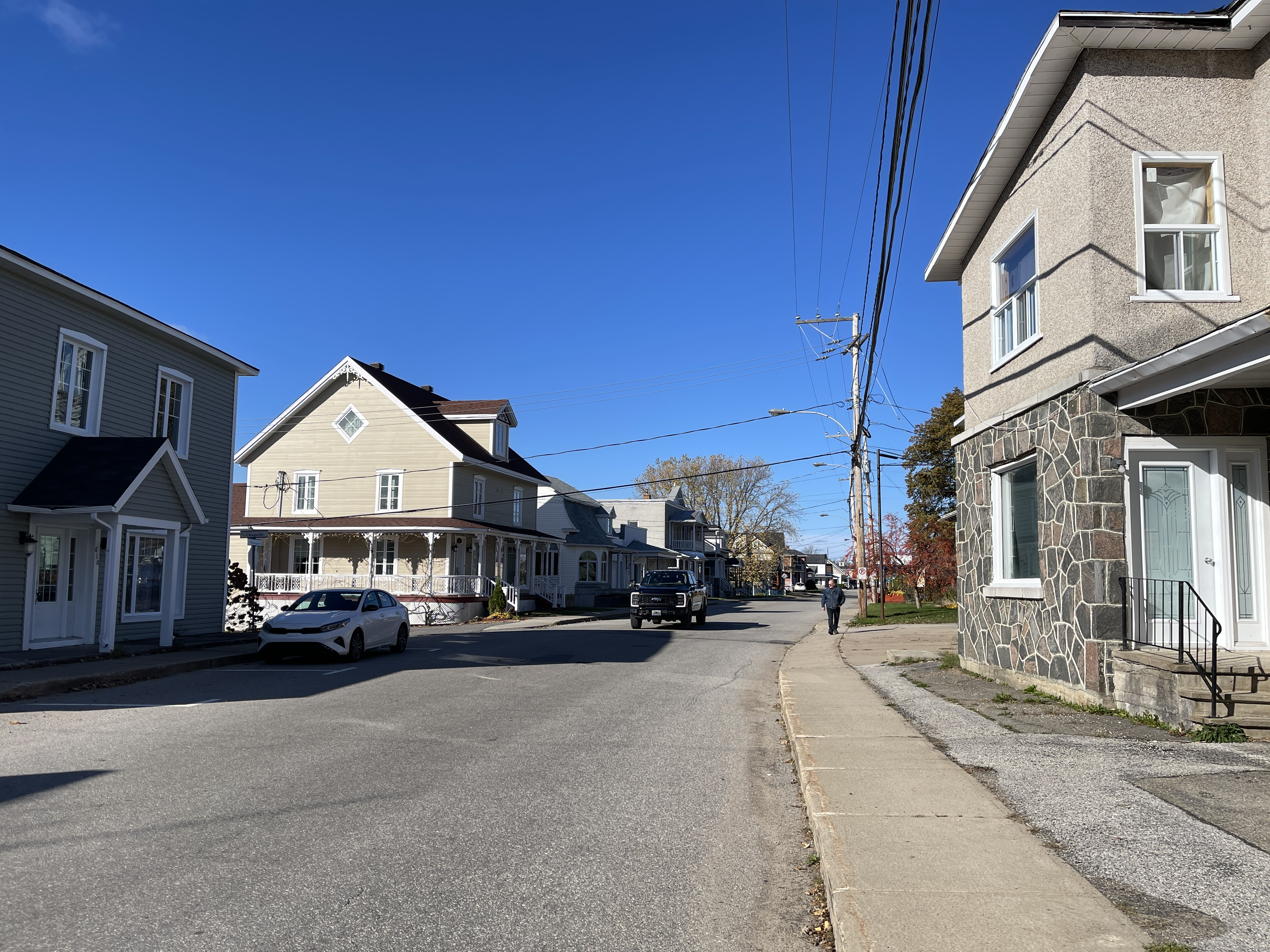
- Principale Street
- Motto: Fidèle à son devoir (Faithful with his duty)
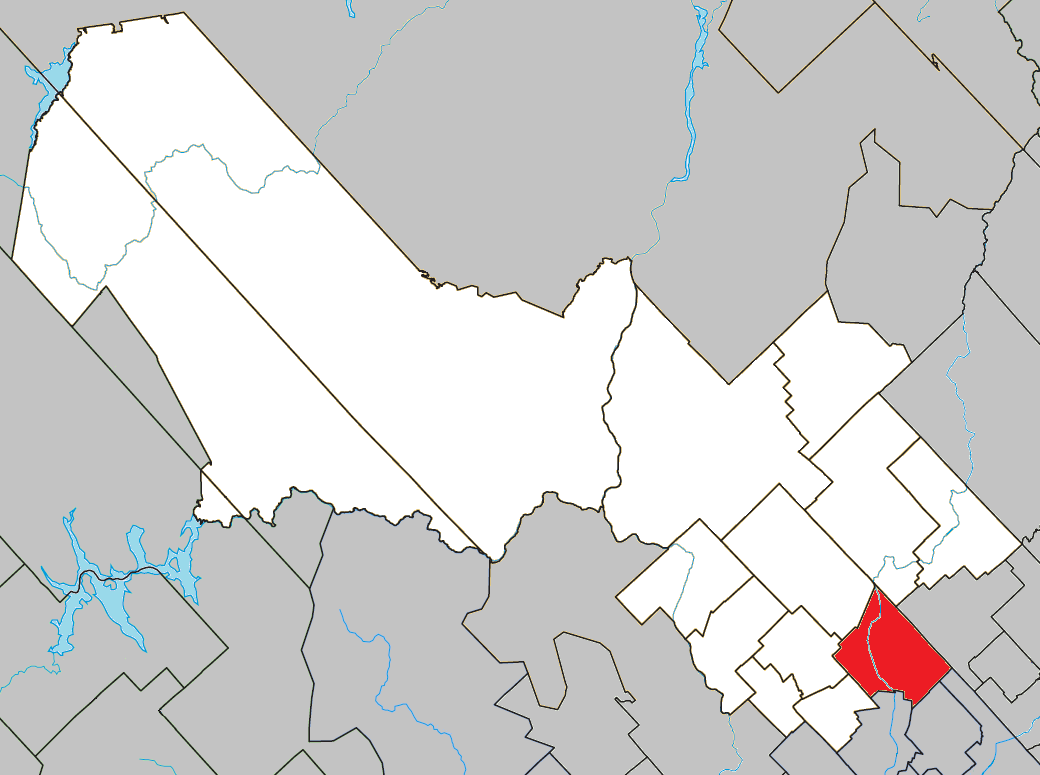
- Location within Mékinac RCM

- Location in central Quebec
- Coordinates: 46°44′N 72°26′W
- Country: Canada
- Province: Quebec
- Region: Mauricie
- RCM: Mékinac
- Settled: 1890s
- Constituted: October 19, 1891

Government
  - Mayor: Carole Neill
  - Fed. riding: Saint-Maurice—Champlain
  - Prov. riding: Laviolette

Area
  - Total: 138.89 km^{2} (53.63 sq mi)
  - Land: 137.08 km^{2} (52.93 sq mi)

Population (2021)
  - Total: 922
  - Density: 6.7/km^{2} (17/sq mi)
  - Change 2016-21: 0.0%
  - Dwellings: 557
- Time zone: UTC−5 (EST)
  - Summer (DST): UTC−4 (EDT)
- Postal code(s): G0X 2G0
- Area codes: 418 and 581
- Highways: R-352
- Website: www.st-adelphe.qc.ca

Saint-Adelphe (French pronunciation: [sɛ̃t‿adɛlf]) is a parish municipality in the Mékinac Regional County Municipality (RCM), in Mauricie, Quebec province, Canada.

It is named for Saint-Adelphe, a bishop whose festival is on 29 August.

== History ==
One of the first residents of Saint-Adelphe, a certain Jeanot, registered himself as an Indian in the 1861 census. His residence was located nearby the Manitou Falls on the banks of the Batiscan River, at the limit of Saint-Stanislas and Saint-Adelphe. This sector is also the old limit of two lordships: Sainte-Anne-de-la-Pérade and Batiscan. Few years later, a dozen pioneer families moved into the area.

In 1860, there were a few settlers, including Veillette, Asselin, Carpentier, Thivierge, Lambert, Baillargeon, Charest, Gervais, Perron, Lafontaine, Baribeau and Lavigueur dit Brouillet.

During the civil foundation in 1891, the parish of Saint-Adelphe has 56 established families (in addition surnames identified in the 1860s): Ayotte, Boisvert, Bordeleau, Brosseau, Cardinal, Cossette, Side, Francoeur, Gauthier, Germain, Hamelin, Mongrain, Roberge, Sauvageau, St-Arneault, Tiffault. Subsequently, families Douville, Gagnon, Plourde and Trépanier came to settle there.

=== Municipal chronology ===
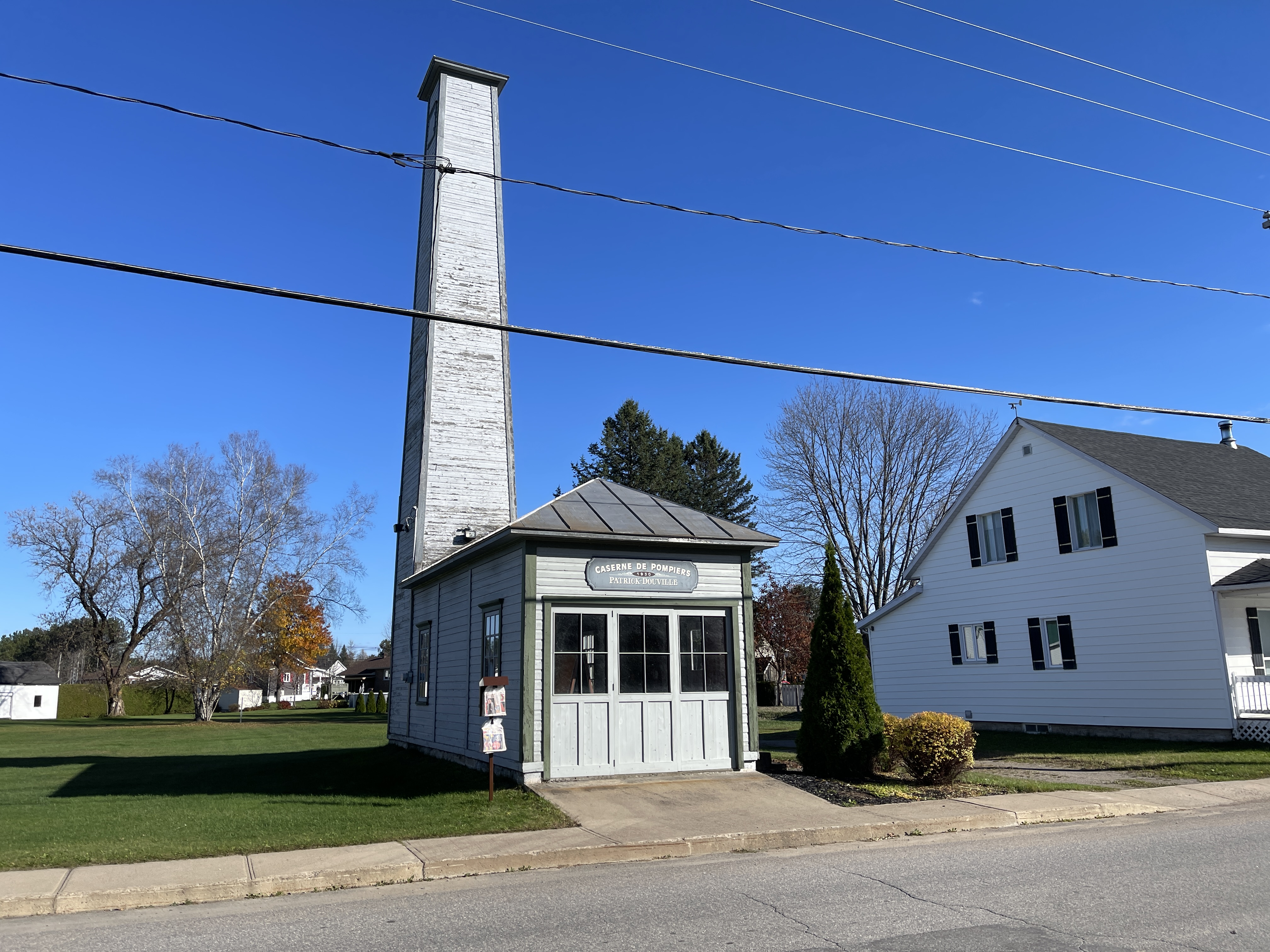
Patrick-Douville Fire Station (1930), Main Street

The civic erection of the parish of Saint-Adelphe was formalized on July 2, 1891. At that time, 56 families were registered in the parish.

- 1891 (July 2) - Civil Erection of the municipality of Saint-Adelphe. The territory assigned to this new entity has 186 acres and 5 perches in front to a depth of 216 acres. The first Council meeting was held on September 21, 1891 and first mayor was the Narcisse Roberge.

In 1893, a tray is made to connect the two banks of the Batiscan River at a cost of $30. The ferry fare is fixed at $0.80 per family for one year and $0.10 per car for non-subscribers and non-residents or $0.01 per pedestrian.

- In 1912, construction of the first aqueduct in the village galvanized iron.

In 1912, PN Chaillez of Saint-Stanislas has built a first toll bridge on the Batiscan River.

- 1923 - Arrival of electricity. The municipality had adopted the regulation on the sale and the April 3 192L electricity service.
- 1924 - Construction of the new covered bridge (wooden) the Batiscan River with a length of 338 feet, with a single central pillar for $16000. This covered bridge included a pedestrian sidewalk on the southeast side.
- 1925 - Construction of new wooden covered bridge on the Pierre-Paul River, almost at its mouth which empties into the Batiscan River.
- 1927 - Construction of a building for fire pumps, nozzles, tank suits. It was erected on the rue de la Chapelle, then was rebuilt on Main Street.
- 1929 - Founding of the People's Fund.
- 1937 - The covered bridge on the Batiscan River is the subject of extensive repairs.
- 1965 - Construction of the cement bridge on the Batiscan River.
- 1968 (November) - Covered Bridge on the Batiscan River is demolished.

=== Religious chronology ===
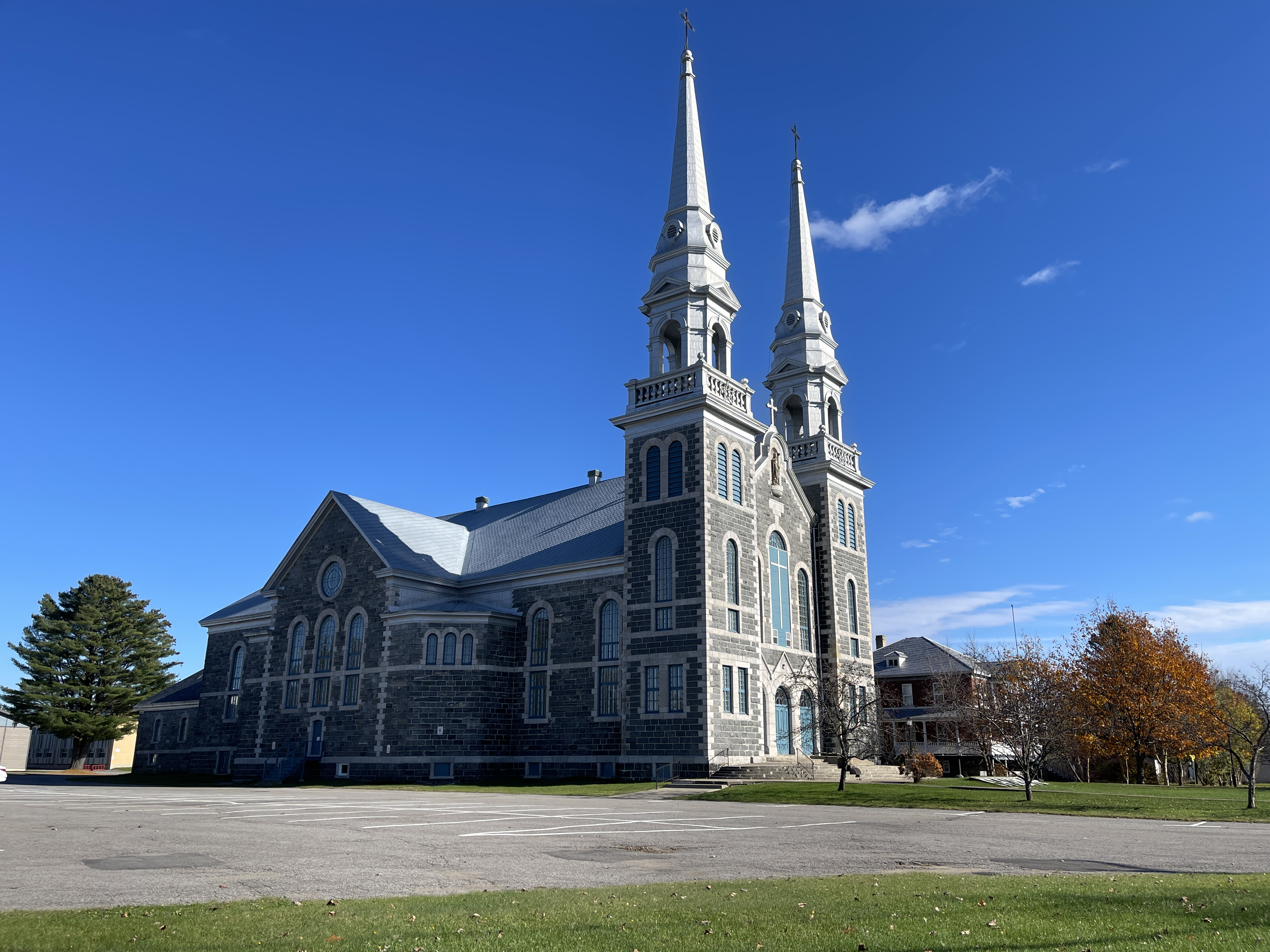
Église de la paroisse Saint-Cœur-de-Marie, rue Baillargeon

- 1885 (April 23) - Canonical erection of the parish of Saint-Adelphe by decree of Bishop Louis-François Richer Laflèche.
- 1889 - Construction of the first chapel and the first rectory, under the direction of Father Michael E. Jannelle, pastor of Sainte-Thècle. These buildings were built on the east side of the Batiscan River, on the site of the actual cemetery.
- 1890 - Arrival of the first resident priest is Father Joseph-Marie Gouin. During the previous five years, the priests of Sainte-Thècle and Saint-Stanislas, had served the parish of Saint-Adelphe.
- 1914 - End of the first sod for the construction of the present church.
- 1936 - beautification of the grounds of the church under the pastor Ferron.
- January 1, 2018 - Creation of the new "fabrique" of the parish of Saint-Coeur-de-Marie, merging the factories of Notre-Dame-des-Anges, Saint-Éloi-les-Mines, Saint-Rémi-du-Lac-aux-Sables, St. Leopold of Hervey-Junction, St. Thecla and St. Adelphe.

== Geography ==
The Batiscan River crosses the territory of the municipality from north to south. This river is recognized as a key passage to the hinterland in Native history.

== Demographics ==
In the 2021 Census of Population conducted by Statistics Canada, Saint-Adelphe had a population of 922 living in 453 of its 557 total private dwellings, a change of 0% from its 2016 population of 922. With a land area of 137.08 km^{2} (52.93 sq mi), it had a population density of 6.7/km^{2} (17.4/sq mi) in 2021.

Canada census – Saint-Adelphe community profile

| | 2021 | 2016 | 2011 |
| Population | 922 (0.0% from 2016) | 922 (-3.2% from 2011) | 952 (-6.0% from 2006) |
| Land area | 137.08 km^{2} (52.93 sq mi) | 137.45 km^{2} (53.07 sq mi) | 137.45 km^{2} (53.07 sq mi) |
| Population density | 6.7/km^{2} (17/sq mi) | 6.7/km^{2} (17/sq mi) | 6.9/km^{2} (18/sq mi) |
| Median age | 56.8 (M: 57.2, F: 56.4) | 56.4 (M: 57.2, F: 55.6) | 52.9 (M: 52.8, F: 53.0) |
| Private dwellings | 557 (total) 453 (occupied) | 596 (total) | 597 (total) |
| Median household income | $58,000 | $46,784 | $46,054 |

References: 2021 2016 2011

Historical census populations – Saint-Adelphe, Quebec

| Year | Pop. | ±% |
|---|---|---|
| 1901 | 750 | — |
| 1911 | 1,437 | +91.6% |
| 1921 | 1,498 | +4.2% |
| 1931 | 1,561 | +4.2% |
| 1941 | 1,699 | +8.8% |
| 1951 | 1,828 | +7.6% |
| 1956 | 1,963 | +7.4% |

| Year | Pop. | ±% |
|---|---|---|
| 1961 | 1,812 | −7.7% |
| 1966 | 1,525 | −15.8% |
| 1971 | 1,277 | −16.3% |
| 1976 | 1,220 | −4.5% |
| 1981 | 1,159 | −5.0% |
| 1986 | 1,098 | −5.3% |
| 1991 | 1,047 | −4.6% |

| Year | Pop. | ±% |
|---|---|---|
| 1996 | 1,014 | −3.2% |
| 2001 | 962 | −5.1% |
| 2006 | 1,013 | +5.3% |
| 2011 | 952 | −6.0% |
| 2016 | 922 | −3.2% |
| 2021 | 922 | +0.0% |

Source: Statistics Canada

Mother tongue (2021):

- English as first language: 3.2%
- French as first language: 94.1%
- English and French as first language: 1.1%
- Other as first language: 1.1%

== Local government ==
Mayors include Réjean Lefebvre (1977-1977 and 1985–1993)

== See also ==
- Batiscanie
- Charest River
