= List of people from Mauricie =

This is a list of people from the Mauricie region of Quebec, Canada.

- Gaétan Barrette – Quebec politician
- Nérée Beauchemin – poet and physician
- Éric Bédard – short track speed skater
- Steve Bégin – hockey player
- Jean Béliveau – hockey player
- Peter Blaikie – prominent lawyer
- Bruno Bordeleau – doctor, mayor, member of Quebec parliament and registrar
- Jacques J. Bouchard – strongly involved in his community, he received the Order of Canada
- Julie Boulet – politician, member of Quebec parliament
- Michaël Bournival – National Hockey League player
- Antoine Ephrem Cartier – 19th-century businessman of Ludington, Michigan
- Aline Chrétien – wife of Jean Chrétien
- Jean Chrétien – Prime Minister of Canada
- Raymond Chrétien – ambassador
- Sylvain Cossette – singer-songwriter
- Antoine Dufour – acoustic guitarist
- Paul Dumont – founding father of the Quebec Major Junior Hockey League
- Louise Forestier – singer and actress
- Maurice Duplessis – Premier of Quebec
- Madeleine Ferron – writer
- Marcelle Ferron – artist
- Gratien Gélinas – playwright and actor
- Martin Gélinas – National Hockey League player
- Antoine Gérin-Lajoie – poet and novelist
- Gérald Godin – poet and politician
- Yanni Gourde – National Hockey League player
- Josaphat Groleau – businessman in lumber industry, mayor
- Maude Guérin – actress
- Ezekiel Hart – businessman, first Jew elected to an official position of the British Empire
- Pauline Julien – singer-songwriter
- Pierre Labrie – poet
- Jacques Lacoursière – historian
- Carole Laure – actress
- Félix Leclerc – singer-songwriter
- Louis-Onésime Loranger – Canadian politician
- Maxime Masson – Roman catholic priest
- Laurent Naud – businessman in lumber industry and commerce
- Bryan Perro – writer
- Jacques Plante – National Hockey League player
- Andre Pronovost – National Hockey League player
- Yvon Rivard – writer
- Sylvie Roy – politician
- James Renald – musician
- Alphée Saint-Amand – mayor, fire chief, chief ambulance, funeral, garage owner, corporate and textile trader leader
- Camil Samson – leader of the Ralliement créditiste du Québec
- Marcel Trudel – Quebec historian
- Doris Veillette – journalist
- Georges W. Veillette – businessman
- Jean Veillet (1664–1741) – French and Canadian ancestor of all the Veillet/te(s) of America
- Jeffrey Veillet – businessman
- Martin Veillette – theologian, philosopher, sociologist, and teacher
- Michel Veillette – Canadian politician in Quebec
- Omer Veillette – businessman
- Claude Wagner – politician
- Henri Wittmann – linguist

== See also ==
- Lists of people from Quebec by region
- Trois-Rivières
- List of Quebec regions
