= Groleau =

Groleau is a surname that may refer to:

== People with the surname ==
- François Groleau (born 1973), ice hockey player from Quebec
- Jason Groleau, Canadian politician
- Josaphat Groleau (1893–1993), Quebec businessman, mayor, county prefect, and president of the Sainte-Thècle Village School Board
- Marcel Groleau, president of the Quebec trade union, Union des producteurs agricoles
