= Naud =

Naud may refer to:

== Persons ==
- Albert Naud, French actor appearing in Life Love Death (1968) and To Die of Love (1971)
- Cassandra Naud (born 1992 or 1993), Canadian actress and dancer
- Daniel Naud (born 1962), Canadian ice hockey player
- Laurent Naud (1909–1992), Quebec businessman operating a wood and building materials business in Sainte-Thècle
- Pierrick Naud (born 1991), Canadian cyclist

== Toponyms ==
- Naud Junction, an area in northern Downtown Los Angeles, California
- Saint-Loup-de-Naud, French commune of Seine-et-Marne
- Calvaire Alexandre-Naud, a monument in the town of Deschambault-Grondines, Quebec, on the list of historic places in Capitale-Nationale
