= Lac des Chicots =

Lake in Quebec, Canada

Lac des chicots (Sainte-Thècle)
- popularly designated in French "Lac aux chicots (French)" (Stubs lake)
- "Lac des Chicots (Sainte-Thècle)" in Batiscanie, in Quebec
- Location: Quebec
- Coordinates: 46.8017°N 72.5175°W
- Lake type: Natural
- Primary inflows: various streams (at the south-west) and stream Vandal close to the village
- Primary outflows: Outlet of "Lac des Chicots"
- Basin countries: Canada
- Max. length: 2 km (1.2 mi)
- Max. width: 0.8 km (0 mi)
- Surface area: 66.3 ha (0.256 sq mi)
- Max. depth: 22.6 m (74 ft)
- Settlements: Sainte-Thècle

The Lac des Chicots (French pronunciation: [lak de ʃiko], lit. 'Stubs Lake') (commonly designated "Lac-aux-Chicots") is located in Sainte-Thècle, in the Mékinac Regional County Municipality, in Mauricie, in province of Quebec, Canada. Well positioned in the heart of the village, the north-east edge of the lake is in "lower village" of Sainte-Thècle behind the Catholic church, and extends in length to the southwest in the direction of Saint-Tite, on the boundary of Saint-Michel-South and Saint-Pierre-South rows.

The original nucleus of the town of Sainte-Thècle was built around the lake. The village began to grow on the strip of land between the "Lac des Chicots" and Croche Lake (Sainte-Thècle) (lac Croche in French). At the beginning of the colonization of Sainte-Thècle, the role of "Lac des Chicots" was especially important for transport, fishing, drinking water through nearby sources, agriculture...

== Toponymy ==
The name "Lac des Chicots" (Stubs Lake) was adopted by the early settlers, because of the large number of stubs. Upon arrival of the pioneers, especially from 1869 (although the first hunting and fishing camp was built in 1867 by Pierre Ayotte's family), several areas of the lake were littered with tree trunks submerged due to subsidence of the surrounding terrain at the foot of the long cliff separating rows Saint-Michel and Saint-Pierre in Sainte-Thècle.

In the 19th century, settlers took advantage of the winter ice to cut these stubs. Under the effect of earthquakes and erosion, rang Saint-Michel sag, while Rang Saint-Pierre is located on top of the cliff. In an inspection report written in 1933, Mr. Grenier (then aged 80) who was interviewed said that while in 1880, the pioneers travelled in canoes between the submerged trees.

The Bank of place names of Commission de toponymie du Québec (Geographical Names Board of Québec) has 29 names using the term "Stubs". The name "Lac des Chicots" (Stubs Lake) in Sainte-Thècle was officially registered December 5, 1968 in the Bank of place names of the Commission de toponymie du Québec (Geographical Names Board of Québec)

== Geography ==
"Lac des Chicots" in Sainte-Thècle has a cross shape elongated in the north-east to south-east. This lake has three sections and several bays. It measures two kilometers in length. Its maximum width is 0.8 km, at the height of 320 meters strait leading to its mouth on the north side. Lake stub is watered by several streams, including:

- at the southwest end of the lake, including the discharge of small "lake Auguste-Leblanc" (rounded form of about 160 m. in diameter and located near the southwest end of Lac des Chicots), the discharge of 1.5 km from "Lac à la peinture" (Painting lake) (which has a length of 160 m. and is just three widths lots of the limits of Saint-Tite) and "Lac Rose" (Rose Lake), located just south of the "Lac à la peinture" (Painting Lake);
- Vandal stream that empties into "Lac des Chicots" southwest of the village (in Saint-Pierre-South row). The name derives from the fact that the head of the stream is located on the old lots owned by Alfred Vandal in Rang Saint-Georges. The Arthur-Groleau branch which begins on former lots of Arthur Groleau (in Saint-Pierre-row North) flows south across the streets Notre-Dame and Bédard. Stream Arthur-Groleau joined the Vandal stream about 110 m. south of the Bédard street bridge and 330 meters from the mouth of Vandal stream.

Chain of Lakes

"Lac des Chicots" is part of a series of onlines in the North-East axis to the South West on 13.4 kilometers between the mouth of the "Lac en Coeur" (Heart Lake), at the north of Hervey-Jonction, Quebec village and the city of Saint-Tite: Lac en Coeur (Heart Lake), "Lac des tounes", Lac Croche, lac des Chicots, Bourdais lake, "Lac à la peinture" (Painting lake), "Lac Rose" (Rose Lake), Trottier lake, "Lac à la Perchaude" (Perch Lake) and former Kapibouska Lake (formed by a bulge in the Rivière des Envies) in the city of Saint-Tite. Between the south-western end of "Lac des Chicots", and the limit of Saint-Tite, we count 13 lots on 2.2 km.

Because of a geological fracture of terreste bark, the "Lac des Chicots" (Lake stubs) and Croche Lake are located at the foot of a long cliff more or less regular (located the east side of this chain of lakes). This chain of lakes is bordered on the East side by Rang Saint-Pierre, which was colonized soon after rows Saint-Michel and Saint-Joseph. The ancient mound site of the present church was the dominant item of this cliff.

Outlets

The stream discharge of "Lac des Chicots" flows westward for 1.9 kilometers (measured by taking into account water coils) to empty into the Rivière des Envies, at the middle of Saint-Joseph's row. While the stream discharge of Croche Lake (the mouth is located in the extreme southwest of the lake) runs on one km (0.45 km to the west where it crosses a stream irrigating row Saint-Michel-North and 0.55 km to the south) to reach the stream discharge of "Lac des Chicots" at the point where Clément Saint-Amand had operated a sawmill at Saint-Michel-South row.

In 1976, the "Lac des Chicots" level was lowered to reconstruct the concrete dam at the lake outlet. Municipalities of the village and the parish of Sainte-Thècle joined their efforts in a campaign for the removal of stubs and cleaning submerged debris from old and small family dumps.

Municipal Boat Launch

A municipal boat ramp launch is located south-west of the village (Saint-Jacques street) on the edge of the strait (330 meters long) at the bottom of which flows the stream from the village station. This stream flows mainly on the old plot of land owned by Philippe Gervais, which was subsequently acquired by Rosaire Bedard, a dairy man. "Lac des Chicots" is renowned for sport fishing.

General characteristics

This lake covers an area of 164 acres. Its maximum depth is 22.6 meters (74 feet). The physio- chemical characteristics of water: pH of 7.3 to 8.8. Dissolved oxygen: 10 ppm (parts per million). Transparency: on metter (3 feet)

Initially, the area around "Lac des Chicots" has been exploited for forestry and agriculture. Today, the lake is fully in agricultural areas, except the section of the village (north-east of the lake is bordered by the lower village and the area of Rue Saint-Jacques (between the church and the intersection of Bédard street)).

== History ==
Colonization of the territory of Sainte-Thècle, located in the Lordship of Sainte-Anne-de-la-Pérade began by clearing lots of row Saint-Michel bordering the northwest side of the "Lac des Chicots" (Stubs Lake) and "Croche Lake". At the beginning of the local colonization (up to 1876), a first rudimentary forest road linked the "Rang des Pointes" (Row of spikes) in Saint-Tite to forest land around "Lac des Chicots" in Sainte-Thècle, which opened colonization.

Driving between Saint-Tite and Sainte-Thècle

Before the construction of roads and bridges spanning the calvettes, ice roads on "Lac des Chicots" and Croche Lake allowed the settler families to travel in winter to Saint-Tite, main economical center of the region, or to logging camps until Missionary Lake. In summer, the settlers used barges or small boats on "Lac des Chicots".

The total driving distance between Sainte-Thècle and Saint-Tite (via the "rang des Pointes" (Row of spikes)) is 12.1 km. The distance between the church of Sainte-Thècle and the southwest end of "Lac des Chicots" is 2.7 km from the Saint-Pierre-South path; then additional 2.2 km to reach the limit of Saint-Tite, through the Saint-Pierre-South Road; 1.5 km on the way among "Chemin des Pointes", 2.3 km on the way to reach the road of "Le Bourdais", 2.8 km to reach Notre-Dame Street; and 0.6 km to reach the church of Saint-Tite. However, winter roads and footpaths in summer or on horseback gave the possibility to take a shortcut, from the southwest end of the "Lac des Chicots" or another shortcut near the "lac le Bourdais" by cutting through forest lots, bypassing the mountains of the area, to reach the road Le Bourdais.

With the construction of the road in 1882, the Rang Saint-Georges, residents of the town of Sainte-Thècle, could borrow this alternative route (the same as the first, from the church) to reach Saint-Tite. While the arrival of the railroad in 1887 allowed residents to travel by rail or to walk on the track to join the other parishes.

== See also ==
- Sainte-Thècle
- Rivière des Envies
- Lordship of Sainte-Anne-de-la-Pérade
- Mekinac Regional County Municipality
- Batiscanie, Quebec
- Croche Lake (Sainte-Thècle)
