= Sainte-Thècle =

- Municipality
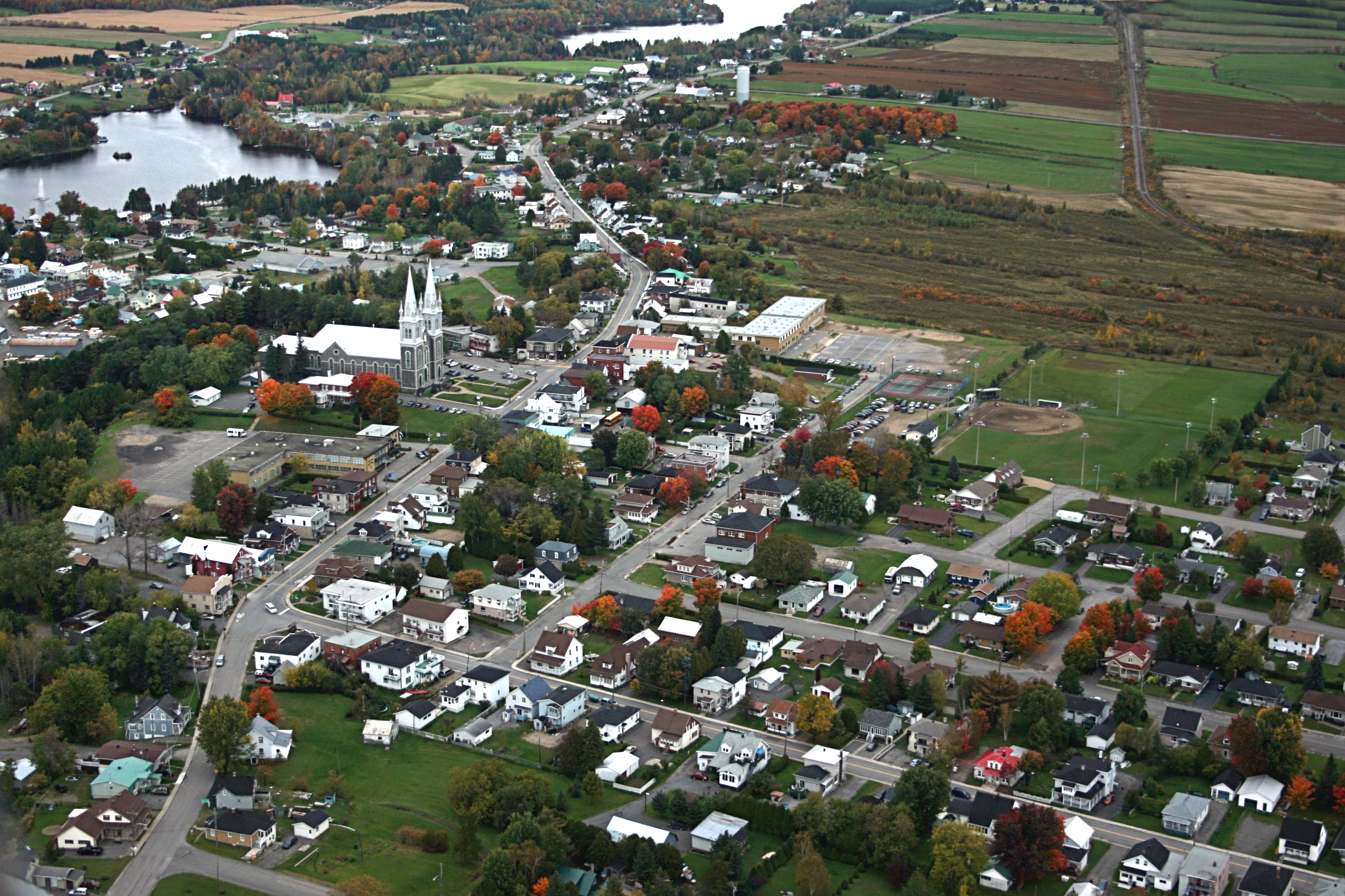
- Aerial view of Sainte-Thècle
- Motto: Passe en semant le bien (Scatter goodness along your path)
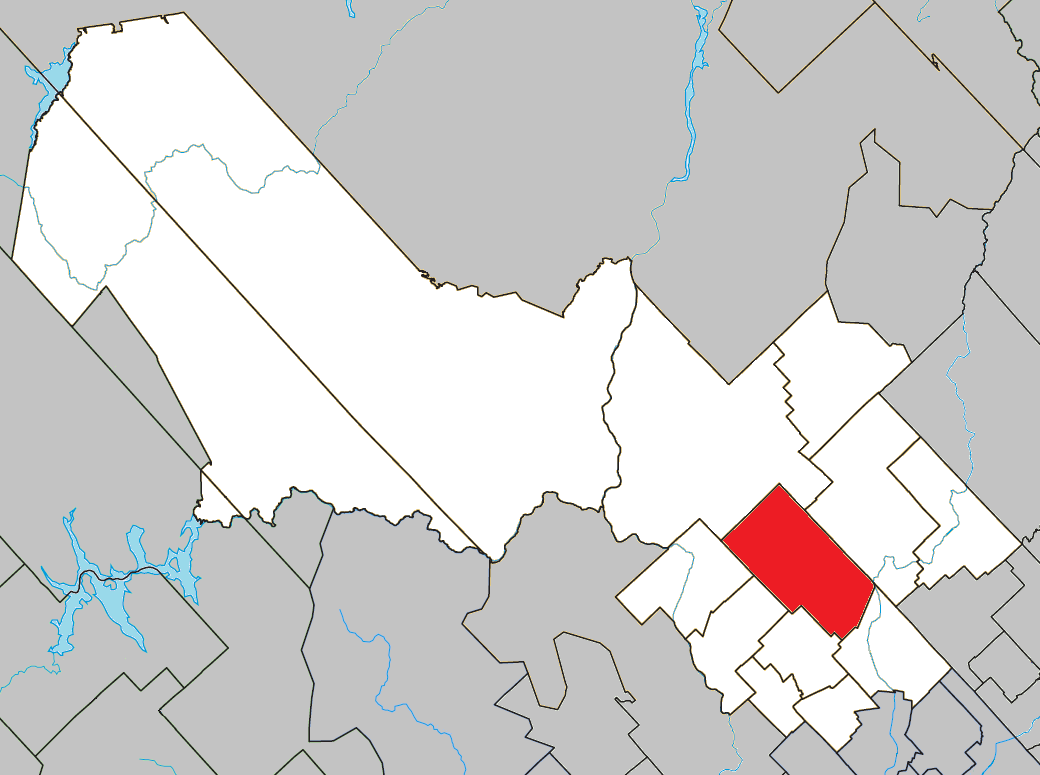
- Location within Mékinac RCM

- Location in central Quebec.
- Coordinates: 46°49′N 72°30′W
- Country: Canada
- Province: Quebec
- Region: Mauricie
- RCM: Mékinac
- Watershed: Batiscan River
- Constituted: June 7, 1989

Government
  - Mayor: Éric Blouin
  - Federal riding: Saint-Maurice—Champlain
  - Prov. riding: Laviolette

Area
  - Total: 221.60 km^{2} (85.56 sq mi)
  - Land: 212.48 km^{2} (82.04 sq mi)

Population (2021)
  - Total: 2,415
  - Density: 11.4/km^{2} (30/sq mi)
  - Pop 2016-2021: ▼2.8%
  - Dwellings: 1,421
- Time zone: UTC−5 (EST)
  - Summer (DST): UTC−4 (EDT)
- Postal code(s): G0X 3G0
- Area codes: 418 and 581
- Highways: R-153; R-352
- Website: www.ste-thecle.qc.ca

Sainte-Thècle (French pronunciation: [sɛ̃t tɛkl]) is a Canadian municipality located in the province of Quebec in the Mékinac Regional County Municipality, in the Batiscanie watershed, in the administrative region of Mauricie. This municipality of 212 square kilometres is known for its resorts and many small lakes. The forest and mountain scenery offers exceptional views for tourists and vacationers. Sainte-Thècle is also a destination for hunting, fishing, snowmobile/all-terrain vehicles and other outdoor sports. The church, rectory and cemetery are located on the main hill of the village and are also heritage sites of interest. The municipality's agricultural and forestry industries have marked its history.

The municipality is named after Saint Thecla, a first-century martyred virgin, converted to Christianity and educated by Saint Paul during his first missionary journey. Thecla was selected as a contemporary of Titus, after whom the nearby parish of Saint-Tite was named. The parish was named by a decree promulgated by Mgr. Louis-François Richer Laflèche, bishop of the diocese of Trois-Rivières on March 15, 1873. Moreover, Moïse Proulx, priest of Saint-Tite, served the parish of Sainte-Thècle until 1880, or until the arrival of the first resident priest.

The toponymy of the rows (rangs in French) of the parish embodies the run-up of Christendom of the 19th century: Saint-Joseph, Saint-Michel, Saint-Pierre, Saint-Georges, and Saint Thomas which is the last one to be merged to the municipality of Sainte-Thècle in 1891.

The main arteries of the village are the old Notre-Dame, Saint-Jacques, Masson, Grenier, Lacordaire, Tessier, Station, and Du Pont. The latter street derives its name from the floating bridge on Lake Croche, which connected the lower village to road St-Michel (north). With the expansion of the village, the names of new streets was a common surname, such as Bédard Street, Veillette, Valley, Piché, Proteau Square, Cloutier Square, Marcotte Road and Marchand Road. Centennial Street (rue du Centenaire) was erected during Celebration of the Sainte-Thècle Centennial in 1973–74, in parallel to Villeneuve Street. Several roads were designated according to their geographical context, such as Chemin de l'Anse (Cove Road), Lake Jesuit, Lake Traverse, Lake Aylwin, Lejeune Township and Lake Button. Joseph St-Amant Road in Lejeune Township is a tribute to a businessman of Saint-Tite who greatly contributed to the forest industry. He owned a sawmill located on the street Ruisseau Le Bourdais in the town.

At the end of the nineteenth century, the village of Sainte-Thècle was divided in two zones: the lower village (the oldest, located between the lake Croche and the lake-aux-Chicots) and the village of the station (which was formed with the economical impact of station of the railroad, arrived in Sainte-Thècle in 1887). Finally the erection of the church, from 1903 to 1905, engendered the construction of streets Saint-Jacques and Masson, creating a third village.

== History ==
=== Municipal chronology ===
- September 23, 1874: the "municipality of the parish of Sainte-Thècle" is officially constituted following the publication of the governmental decree in the Official Newspaper of Quebec (Gazette officielle du Québec).
- April 27, 1909: the "municipality of the village of Sainte-Thècle" is created. Its territory (village of the church and village of the station) gets loose from the "municipality of the parish".
- 1958: The sector of the lower village gets loose from the "municipality of the parish" and merges to the "municipality of the village".
- On January 1, 1982: implementation of the Mékinac Regional County Municipality ("Municipalité régionale de comté") which replaced the "corporation of county" which had been set up in 1855. The RCM of Mékinac is a supramunicipale organization for the territory which includes all the municipalities of the RCM of Mékinac area. The powers of RMC lean at the same time on statutory compulsory skills and on additional skills according to the will of the municipalities of its territory for common services.
- June 7, 1989: merger between the "municipality of the parish" and that of the village of Sainte-Thècle in order to form the "municipality of Sainte-Thècle".

=== School chronology ===
- 1878: creation of the first "Sainte-Thècle school board" (Commission scolaire de Sainte-Thècle). The first meeting of the school board was held on March 4, 1878 in Théophile Magnan's residence.
- 1915: Separation of the territory of Sainte-Thècle in two school board: village and parish.
- 1949: Merger of both school board in only one.
- 1965: Foundation of the CSRM ("Regional School Board of Mauricie area" - "Commission scolaire régionale de la Mauricie") in order to organize all the secondary education level, effective as of July 1st, 1965. Whereas the "School board of Sainte-Thècle" (Commission scolaire de Sainte-Thècle) continues to organize the education of primary level.
- 1969: Cessation of the teaching of secondary level 3 and more, in June, 1969, in Sainte-Thècle. Furthermore, this secondary level education is dispensed in "Polyvalente Paul Le Jeune" in Saint-Tite which opened its doors in September, 1969.
- As of July 1, 1972: merger of the "School Board of Sainte-Thècle" (Commission scolaire de Sainte-Thècle) with the "School Board of Normandie" ("Commission scolaire de Normandie") which already had the responsibility since 1969 of the teaching of primary level.
- As of July 1, 1998: the "School Board of Normandy"(Commission scolaire de Normandie) is dissolved on June 30, 1998, to give way on July 1, 1998 to the "School Board of the Energy"(Commission scolaire de l'Énergie) which is furthermore responsible to administer the elementary and the secondary sector on the same territory as the previous CSRM (territory: from Mont-Carmel, up to Parent in Abitibi).

=== Religious chronology ===
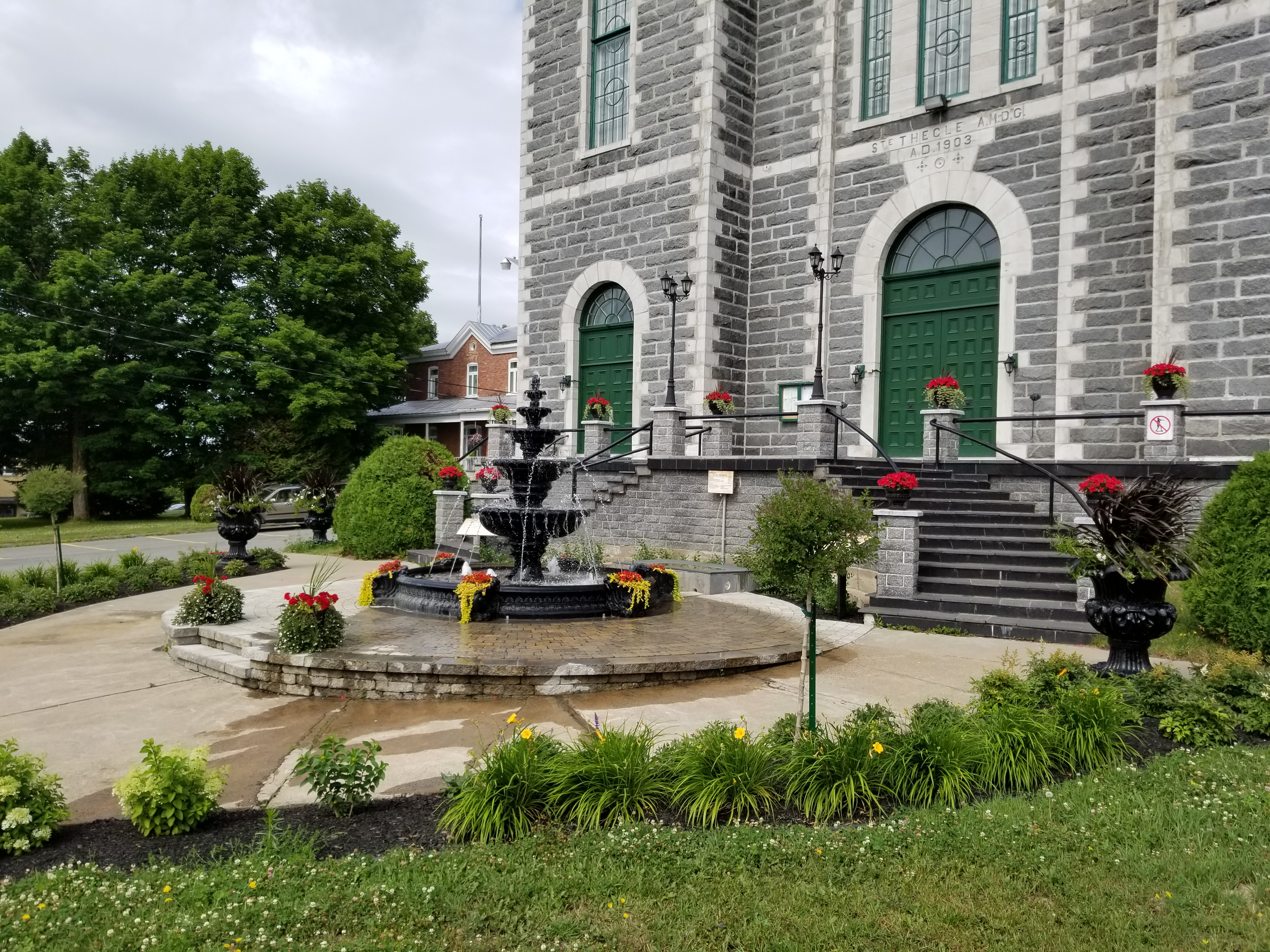
Fountain erected in 2017 in front of the church.

- 1873 - March 14 - canonical erection of the "Catholic parish of Sainte-Thècle" (Paroisse catholique de Sainte-Thècle).
- 1876 - September 19 - Land gift by notarial act from Lord John E. Price to the "Fabrique de Sainte-Thècle" with the aim of setting up a chapel there.
- From 1877 to 1879 - Construction of the chapel in the lower village.
- 1880 - Opening of the registers of baptismal certificates, marriages and graves of Sainte-Thècle. Previously, acts relative to the residents of the Lac-aux-Chicots (Sainte-Thècle) were registered on the registers of Saint-Tite.
- 1893 - Enlargement of the chapel of the lower village, following a new decree of the bishop as of October 6, 1892. This enlargement allowed the addition of 75 benches while initially the chapel contained 97 benches in its surrounding wall.
- 1903 - Choice of the future church site at the highest site of the sector and beginning of the construction of the church.
- 1903 - Maxime Masson's arrival, on February 6, 1903, as priest (curé) of Sainte-Thècle. His cure lasted 52 years (up to 1955).
- 1904 - Approval on November 18, 1904 of the new cemetery site, located at the top of the highest hillside, between both villages: the station village and the lower village.
- 1905 - September 18 - Last grave in the cemetery of the lower village. It is about Marie Paquin's skin, wife of François Béland.
- 1905 - September 24 - First religious celebration in the new church. The sale of benches was made on same Sunday after the big mass.
- 1905 - Construction of the Cross path inside the church.
- 1907 and 1908 - Erection of the Cross path inside the sacristy.
- 1914 - Acquisition of big organ of the church, as a replacement the former organ which resulted from the chapel.
- 1932 - New phase of arrangement of the finish of the inside of the church, in particular by the painter Louis-Édouard Monti.
- 1938 - August 3 - A hurricane brings down both bell towers of the church of Sainte-Thècle. Several houses and the other buildings were damaged.
- 1939 - April - the Beginning of the works of realization of paintings decorating walls and vault of the church, by Louis-Édouard Monty, artist of Montreal. The Priest Maxime Masson realizes paintings in the ceiling of the sacristy.
- 1938 - Manufacturing by the priest Maxime Masson of a lion in cement, settled on an outside base of the northeast side of the church, symbolizing that the "Fabrique de Sainte-Thècle" is released from the debt generated by the construction of the church from 1903 till 1905.
- July 1st, 1955 - The end of the parish priest of 52 years Maxime Masson October 15, 1867, in Saint-Justin – 2 October 1960 at Pointe-du-Lac).
- 1965 - March - Installation of a new altar in the choir of the church so that from now on, the priest face is oriented toward people.
- 1974 - Installation of the commemorative stone in the grass in front of the church, at the end of centennial festivities of the civil and canonic erection of Sainte-Thècle parish. This stone has been moved in 2017 in the grass in front of the presbytery.
- 1983 - End of the cure (1962-1985) of André Morin (born February 24, 1907, at Lac-à-la-Tortue).
- 1987 - Reconstruction of the high altar in the choir of the church.
- 1993 - February - The church was used as the scene for the wedding shoot in the television series "Blanche" at Radio-Canada.
- 2017 - Inauguration of the fontain in front of the church, on the same site than the old one from the area of Mr Masson priest.
- January 1st, 2018 - Creation of the new "fabrique" of the parish of Saint-Coeur-de-Marie including the "fabriques" of Notre-Dame-des-Anges, Saint-Eloi-les-Mines, Saint-Rémi-du-Lac-aux-Sables, St. Leopold of Hervey-Junction, St. Thecla and St. Adelphe.
- June 10, 2018 - Inauguration of the new "fabrique" in the presence of the Bishop of the Diocese of Trois-Rivières, Bishop Luc Bouchard.
- September 5, 2018 - The end of Gérald Baril's 33 years old (2nd longest in the history of Sainte-Thècle), since 1985.
- September 6, 2018 - The new presiding priest, Fr. Benoit Muhindo Matiri, of the parish of Saint-Coeur-de-Marie took office.
- Summer 2018 - Renovation of the interior of the Calvary of Sainte-Thècle Cemetery.

=== Coat of arms of Sainte-Thècle ===
Since the mid-20th century, the town of Sainte-Thècle uses this blazon trifecta that comes from the College of Arms of Canada. Its original interpretation was tinged with the spirit of Christianity. This blazon was published on April 14, 1958, in the regional newspaper Le Nouvelliste (published in Trois-Rivières, QC). On January 17, 1973, René Veillette summarized the original interpretation in a column on the history of Sainte-Thècle, in the journal Le Dynamique (published in Saint-Tite, Quebec). This interpretation has been actualized by the historian Gaétan Veillette in 2012.

The golden triangle in the upper part of the shield symbolizes the saints and heroes of the history, whose example inspired morality and customs. Widely used in heraldic domain, the golden color means brightness, righteousness, faith, strength and constancy. At the center of the first trifecta, the heart means kindness and dedication, recalling the life and accomplishment of Thècle, parish patron. Crown affixed over the heart evokes her sanctification.

The second trifecta, colored in blue azure, symbolizes purity. The fir tree represents the timber industry that dominated the local economy with agriculture throughout history. This fir tree is planted on a hill, which indicates the highest point of the village, the site of the church.

In the third trifecta, at the right of the shield, bees embody the workforce and bravery. Recognized as being laborious, bees inspire respect. In harmony with nature, their role is crucial in the eco-system. The red background shows solidarity and perseverance of this population throughout the difficulties of life and collective issues.

The twig of maple branches in the background represents the common tree in Sainte-Thècle. They evoke the maple groves that produced maple syrup. Maple leaf is also the emblem of the country.

The bottom banner features the official motto of Sainte-Thècle: "Scatter goodness along your path". This motto reflects an attitude to be adopted by each citizen in every action of his life. Finally, the red ribbon that binds the two branches of maple leaves is a sign of unity.

== Geography ==
Sainte-Thècle is located at the junction of provincial roads 153 and 352. Road 153, which runs north–south, connects Yamachiche to Lac-aux-Sables through Saint-Tite. On its way to Sainte-Thècle, route 153 covers the path of the great rang St-Georges, Notre-Dame street, St-Jacques street and road St-Pierre-North. route 352, which runs east–west. from Trois-Rivières, through Saint-Stanislas, Saint-Adelphe, and Sainte-Thècle, on the path of road Rompré and road St-Thomas, before ending at its juncture with road 153 in the village of Sainte-Thècle.

The municipality of Sainte-Thècle shares borders with Saint-Tite to the south, Grandes-Piles to the southwest, Saint-Roch-de-Mékinac also to the south-west, Trois-Rives to the north, Lac-aux-Sables also to the north, and Saint-Adelphe to the southeast. Most of Sainte-Thècle is part of the Batiscan River watershed, with the exception of a two smalls area in its northeastern territories near Trois-Rives) and Missionary Lake.

The highest Laurentian Mountains of Middle Mauricie are located in the northwestern part of the municipality of Sainte-Thècle. A dozen of the peaks are over 400 meters high. The tallest are those encircled the lakes that dot the region: lakes Eric (Grandes-Piles), lake Vlimeux, lake Button, Lake Thom, Missionary Lake-North, the Lake Jesuit, "lake de l'Aqueduc", as well as the area along the northwest of Saint-Joseph-South row.

Archange Lake is the border between Grandes-Piles and Sainte-Thècle.

=== Hydrography ===
The territory of Sainte-Thècle is characterized by five river sub-basins of the Batiscanie and one of the Saint-Maurice River:

• the Mekinac River which course part start at the mouth of Mékinac Lake to flow into the Saint-Maurice River in Middle-Mauricie. The northern part of Lejeune Township flows to the Mekinac River, including Lake Button and Lake Lejeune. The latter joined the Thom stream via Lake Bouchard, Lake George and Lake Thom. The Thom stream flows into the Mékinac River in the village of Saint-Joseph-de-Mékinac.

• the Little Mékinac North River whose northern section is 19 km (12 mi) long. This river has its source in Sainte-Thècle at 3rd Lake Champlain (altitude: 302 m (991 ft)). The waters flow southward subsequently in the second lake (altitude: 272 m (892 ft)), then the first Lake Champlain (altitude: 260 m (850 ft)). The course of the river continues southbound, crossing lakes Cobb-Dorval (2.4 km (1.5 mi) from the mouth of the next lake) and Pelard (2.8 km (1.7 mi) from the mouth of the small lake Dorval) (altitude: 229 m (751 ft)). The limit of Sainte-Thècle and Grandes-Piles, Quebec, is just south of Lake Pelard and the water down to the lake "à Pierre" (altitude: 228 m) and the small lake Dorval (located 3 km (1.9 mi) from Lake Roberge (Grandes-Piles). At the south of Lake Cobb-Dorval, the river collects another discharge from the west who pours the waters of lakes Embryo, "au canard" and Button. At the center of the lake Nicolas (altitude: 227 m (745 ft)), the river receives on the East side, the outlet of Lake Fontaine (Mékinac) (altitude: 287 m (942 ft)). Finally, the river flows into a small lake located in the northwest end of Lake Roberge (Grandes-Piles) (altitude: 176 m (577 ft)). This small lake also receives the waters of the second Lake Roberge which discharge flows south-east. The discharge of this small lake o is only hundred meters and empties into the North-West end of Lake Roberge (Grandes-Piles);

• Rivière des Envies which crosses the rang St-Joseph (southbound), taking it source at Lake Traverse; then the river runs through the territory of Saint-Tite (via the "Rang des Pointes"), Saint-Séverin and empties into the Batiscan river in Saint-Stanislas;

• Pierre-Paul River takes it source at Lac Pierre-Paul (Mékinac), located in the eastern part of the territory of Saint-Tite. The main course of the river runs first north draining part of the Rang St-Georges (South) in Sainte-Thècle, then branches off to the right about 160 degrees to head south following in parallel route 352 (between Sainte-Thècle and Saint-Adelphe) in row St-Thomas (South). It course cut the rang St-Émile (in Saint-Adelphe), and empties into the Batiscan River (on the right bank), up to the village of Saint-Adelphe. While the "Bras de la rivière Pierre-Paul" (Arm of Pierre-Paul River) drains much of the row St-Thomas (in the north-south direction) in perpendicularly intersecting lots, crosses the road 352, then veers to the south and cross the road St-Émile to discharge into the Pierre-Paul River (about .5 km (0.31 mi) from the mouth of the latter, which flows into the Batiscan River)

• Tawachiche River is flowing north-south on 25 km (16 mi) entirely within the municipality of Lac-aux-Sables. The river crosses the Zec Tawachiche to move to the northern boundary of the village Hervey-Jonction where there are waterfalls. Then the river runs along the southwestern boundary of the municipality of Lac-aux-Sables and Sainte-Thècle. Tawachiche River throws herself into the Batiscan River, in Lac-aux-Sables, at the boundary of Sainte-Thècle, in an area designated the "Pee-Wee". It main tributary is the Tawachiche West River.

In Indian history, these three rivers are deemed to have served as a way of transport to reach upstream lakes with canoes (depending the water level) or walking on ice in winter. Many beaver dams slowed the water flow. These rivers were also used to transport wood and some saw mills were established along the way.

• Batiscan River flowing southward on 177 km (110 mi), has it source in Lake Édouard (Quebec) in Haute-Mauricie. It flows through the Portneuf Wildlife Reserve through Rivière-à-Pierre (River of stones), Notre-Dame-de-Montauban, Lac-aux-Sables, Sainte-Thècle (limit), Saint-Adelphe, Saint-Stanislas, Saint-Narcisse, Sainte-Geneviève-de-Batiscan and Batiscan.

== Demographics ==
Population trend:

Year	Population	Variation (%)	Median age
2021	2,415	▼-2,8 %	58,4 years
2016	2,484	▲-0,2 %	55,7 years
2011	2,478	▼-0,3 %	53,4 years
2006	2,486	▼-1,1 %	51,1 years
2001	2,513	▼-6,9 %	46,4 years
1996	2,698	▼-2,5 %	
1991	2,766	-	

Private dwellings occupied by usual residents: 1,182 (total dwellings: 1,421)

Mother language of Sainte-Thècle's citizens:

- French as first language: 98.5%
- English as first language: 0.4%
- English and French as first language: 0.4%
- Other as first language: 0.4%

== Attractions ==
- St-Jean-Optimist Park, located in the village, on the edge of Lac Croche (southern part of the lake). This site contains a public municipal beach, a water fountain illuminated in the middle of the lake, a boat launch for pleasure craft, a landing, a center of recreation, picnic tables, a volleyball site, and Laurent Naud's Drive, located on the South shores of Lac-Croche (between Du Pont street and Parc St-Jean-Optimist). In winter, the skating trail is popular. Several social and sporting events are held at the St-Jean-Optimist Park.
- Church erected from 1903 to 1905, located on the highest hill in the heart of the village. Built under the direction of Priest Maxime Masson, the church of Sainte-Thècle is one of the finest religious heritage of La Mauricie and Quebec.
- Cemetery of upper village (designated "Masson Cemetery"), located behind the church. It features the "Stations of the Cross" carved in stone, a "calvaire" and many old funerary monuments remembering our ancestors. Note: The cemetery below is designated "Janelle cemetery", evoking the work of life of the priest Michel Janelle of Sainte-Thècle.
- Public landing site on the shore of Lac-du-Jésuite (Lake Jesuit), in the southern part of the lake near the mouth.
- Public landing site on the shore of Lac-aux-Chicots (located in rang St-Pierre-Sud, near the village).
- Chnabail Lake Trail (accessible by road from the Lake Jesuit) which offers a walk in the forest to rediscover the wilderness.
- Country skying club "Le Geai Bleu" (The Blue Jay), located at 2501, chemin Saint-Michel Nord, Sainte-Thècle. This center offers 11.7 km (7.3 mi) of groomed trails.
- Maple shack (cabanes à sucre). There are several producers of maple products in Sainte-Thècle, active in Spring season. Some "maple shack" (cabane-à-sucre) have a room to accommodate groups and provide meals, especially the maple shack "Chez Angelo and Anita", located in 1631, chemin Saint-Georges, Sainte-Thècle.
- Camping "Domaine Lac et Forêt" (Domain of Lake and Forest), located on road St-Pierre North, offering activities for all age groups: volleyball, basketball, dodgeball, floor hockey, games (indoor and outdoor), and an important pool producing high wages.
In addition, visitors can benefit from the snowmobile or ATV, hunting and fishing, camping and resort trails. There are also many lakes in Sainte-Thècle for boating.

== Notable people ==
- Éric Bédard (1976— ), Olympic champion in speed skating.
- Bruno Bordeleau (1868–1929), doctor, mayor of the village of Sainte-Thècle, member of Québec parliament and registrar for Champlain County.
- Josaphat Groleau (1893–1993), a businessman in the lumber industry, the municipality mayor of the village for three periods 1927-1931, 1947-1955 and 1960-1965. He was president of the school board of the village from 1947 to 1949. He ended his public career as warden.
- Maxime Masson (1867–1960), pastor of parish of Sainte-Thècle from 1903 to 1955.
- Laurent Naud (1909–992), a businessman in the lumber industry and commerce.
- Yvon Rivard (1945— ), author, born here in 1945. He is a two-time Governor General's Award winner, receiving the Governor General's Award for French-language fiction in 1986 for Les silences du corbeau, and the Governor General's Award for French-language non-fiction in 2013 for Aimer, enseigner.
- Alphée Saint-Amand (1903–1983), mayor, fire chief, chief ambulance, funeral, garage owner, corporate and textile trader leader.
- Benoît Tousignant (1927–2015), cardiologist who practiced in Trois-Rivières from 1964 to 1991.
- Jeffrey Veillet (1881–1946), businessman in the lumber industry and commerce.

== Photo gallery ==
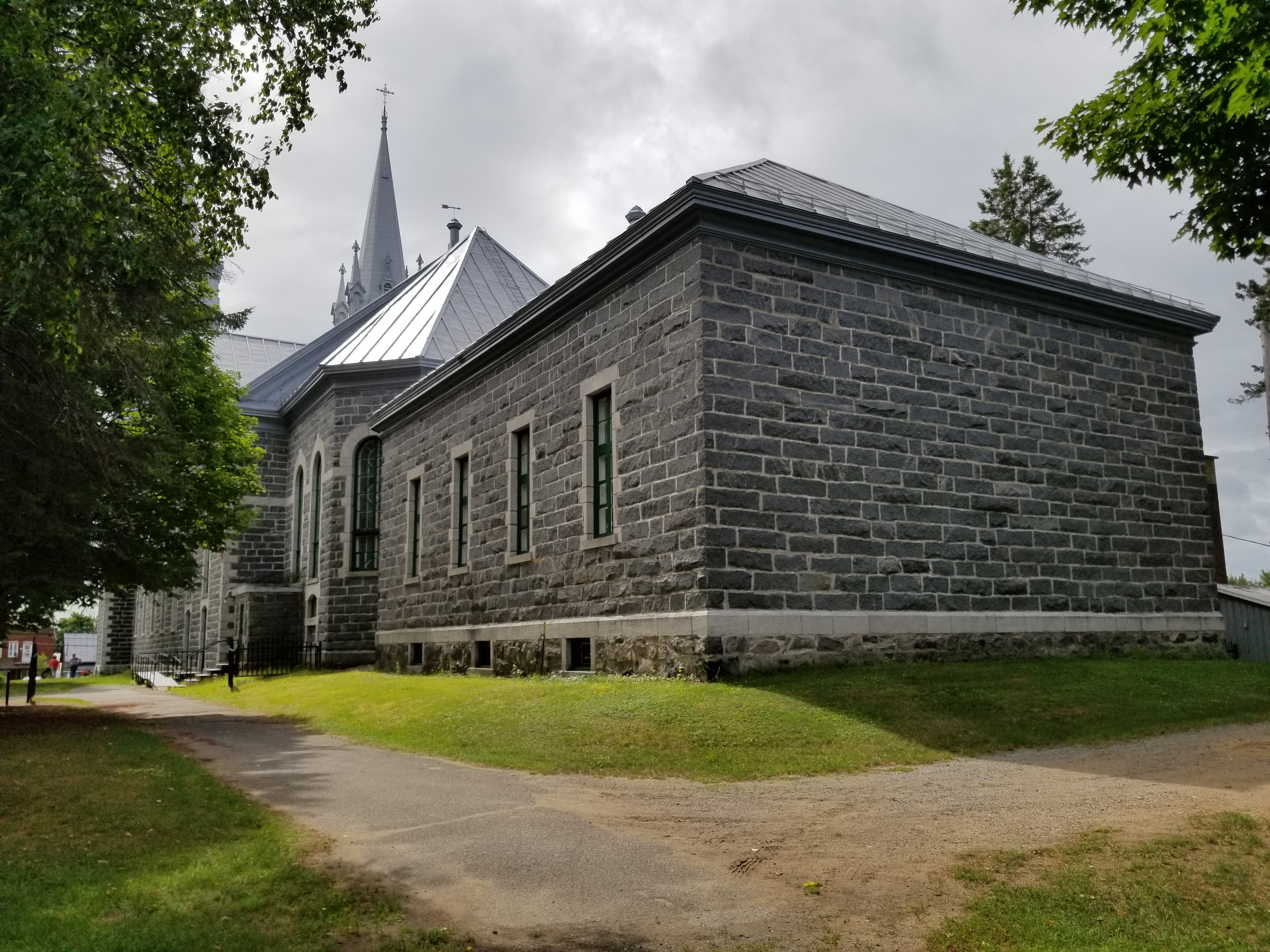
Rear of the Church of Sainte-Thècle, which was built from 1903 to 1905.

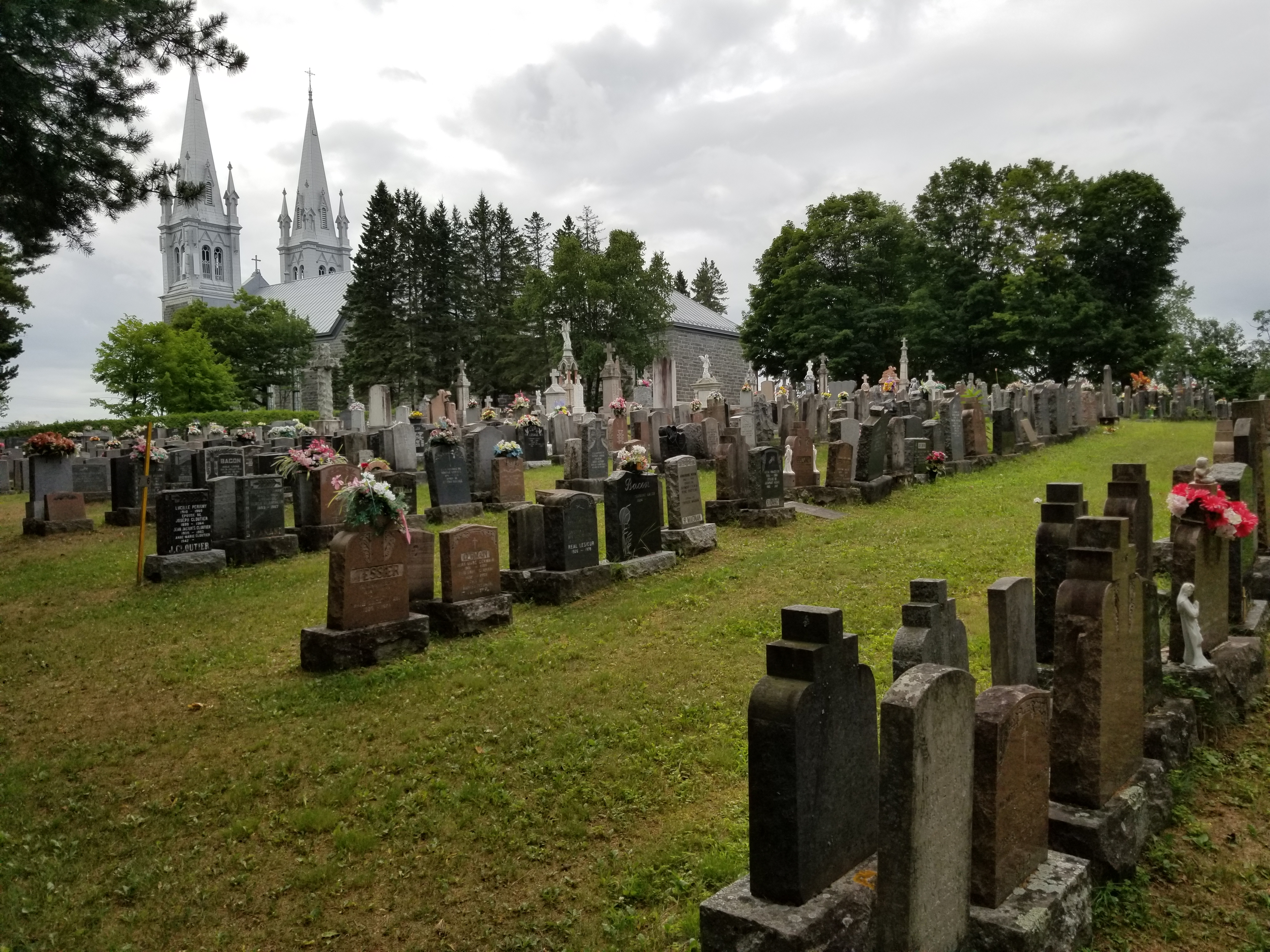
View of the northern section of the cemetery at the top of Sainte-Thècle.

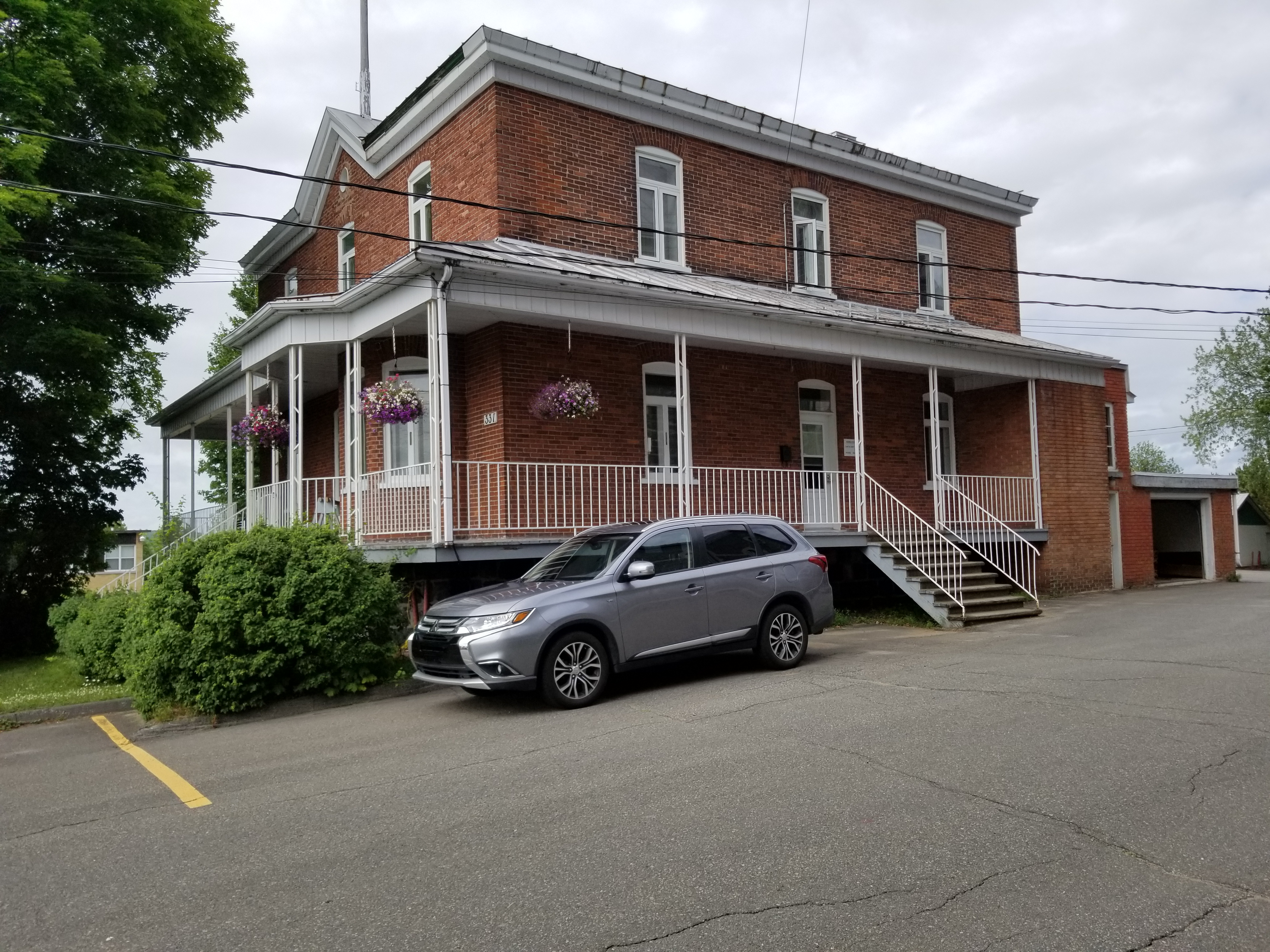
Presbytery of Sainte-Thècle.

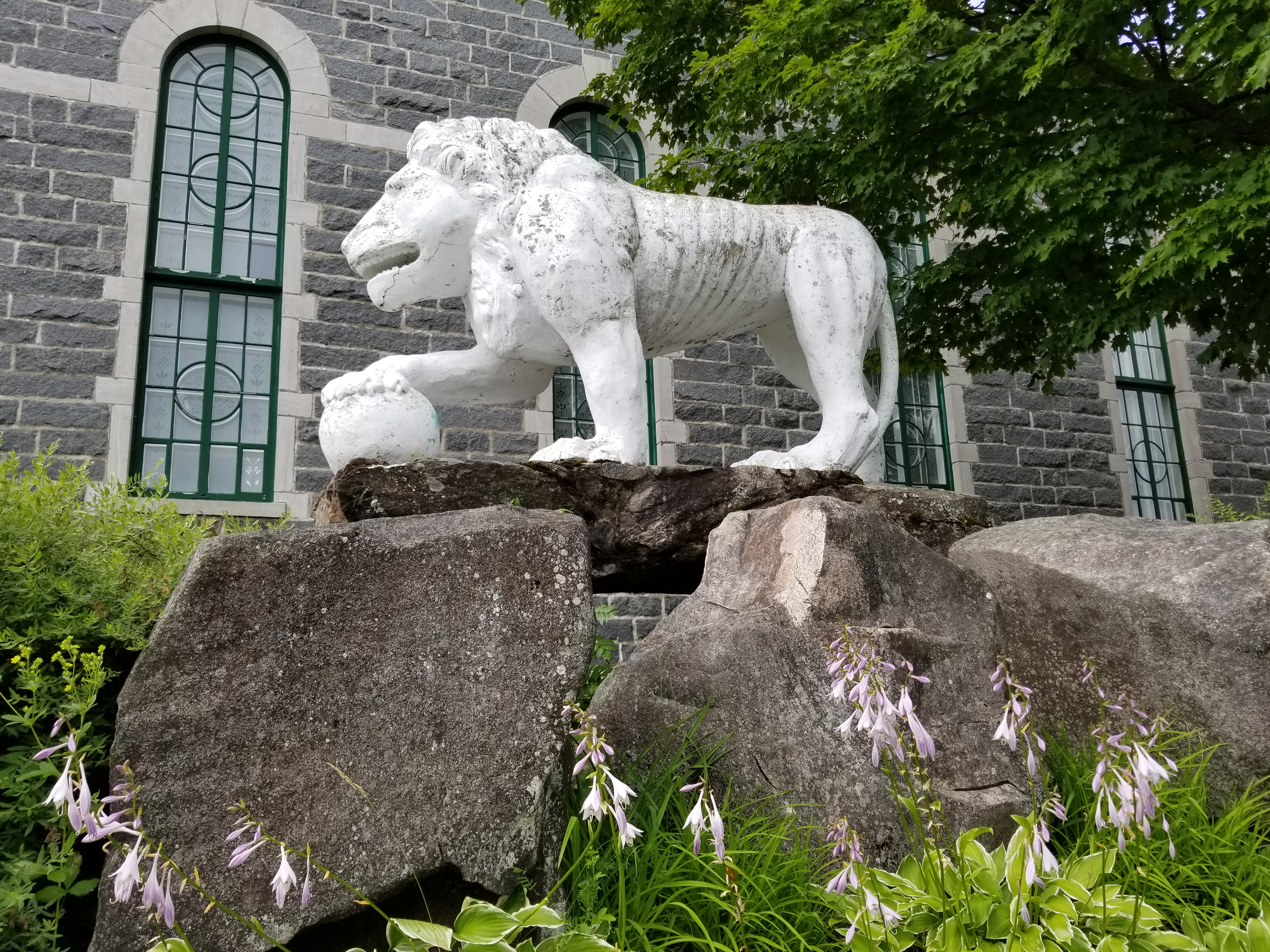
Cement lion on the north-east side of the church of Sainte-Thècle fashioned by the priest Maxime Masson.

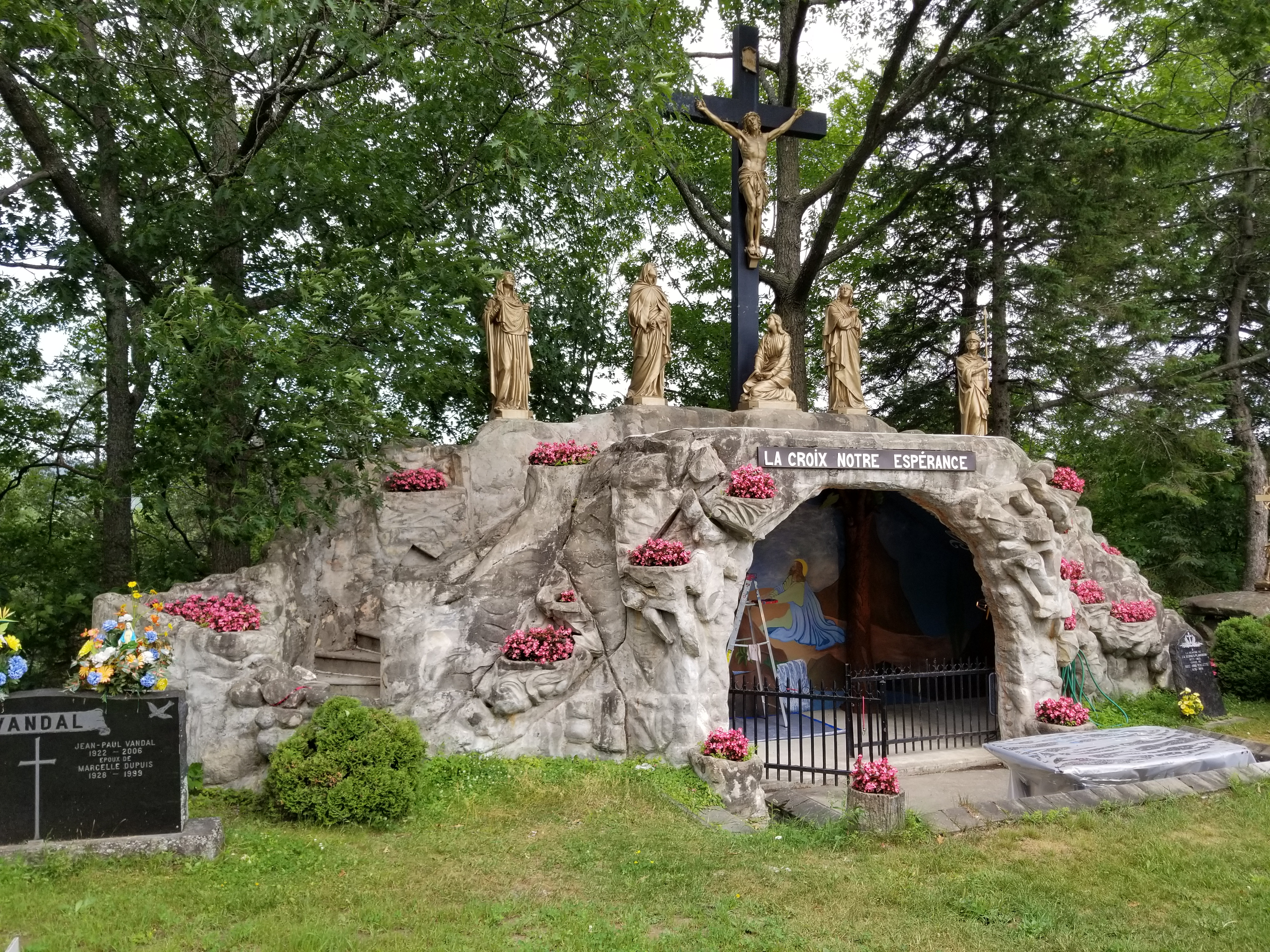
Calvary erected by the priest Maxime Masson at the top of the cliff of the cemetery of Sainte-Thècle.

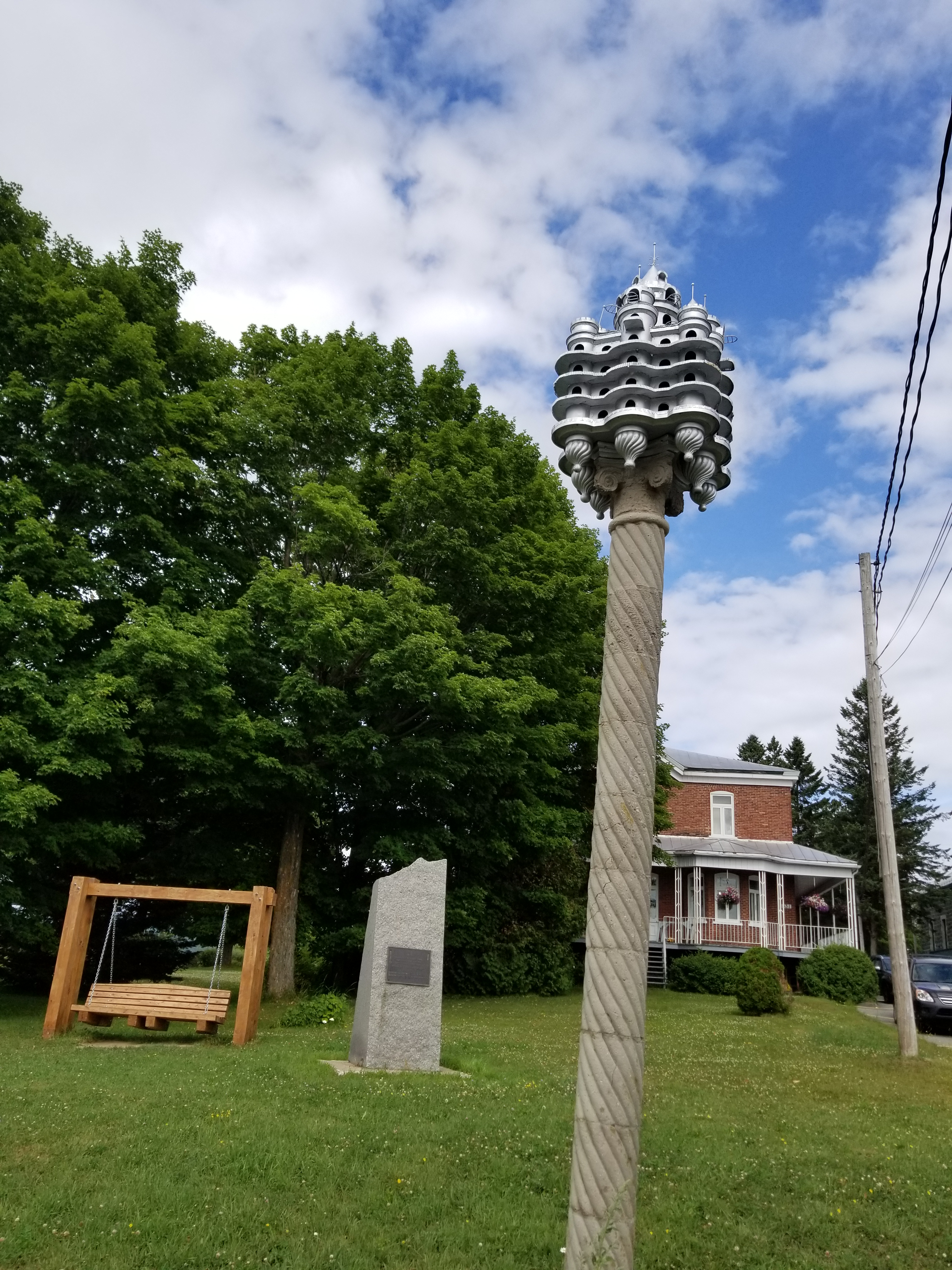
Castle of birds of the time of the parish priest Maxime Masson and stone of the Centenary, installed in the front parterre of the presbytery.

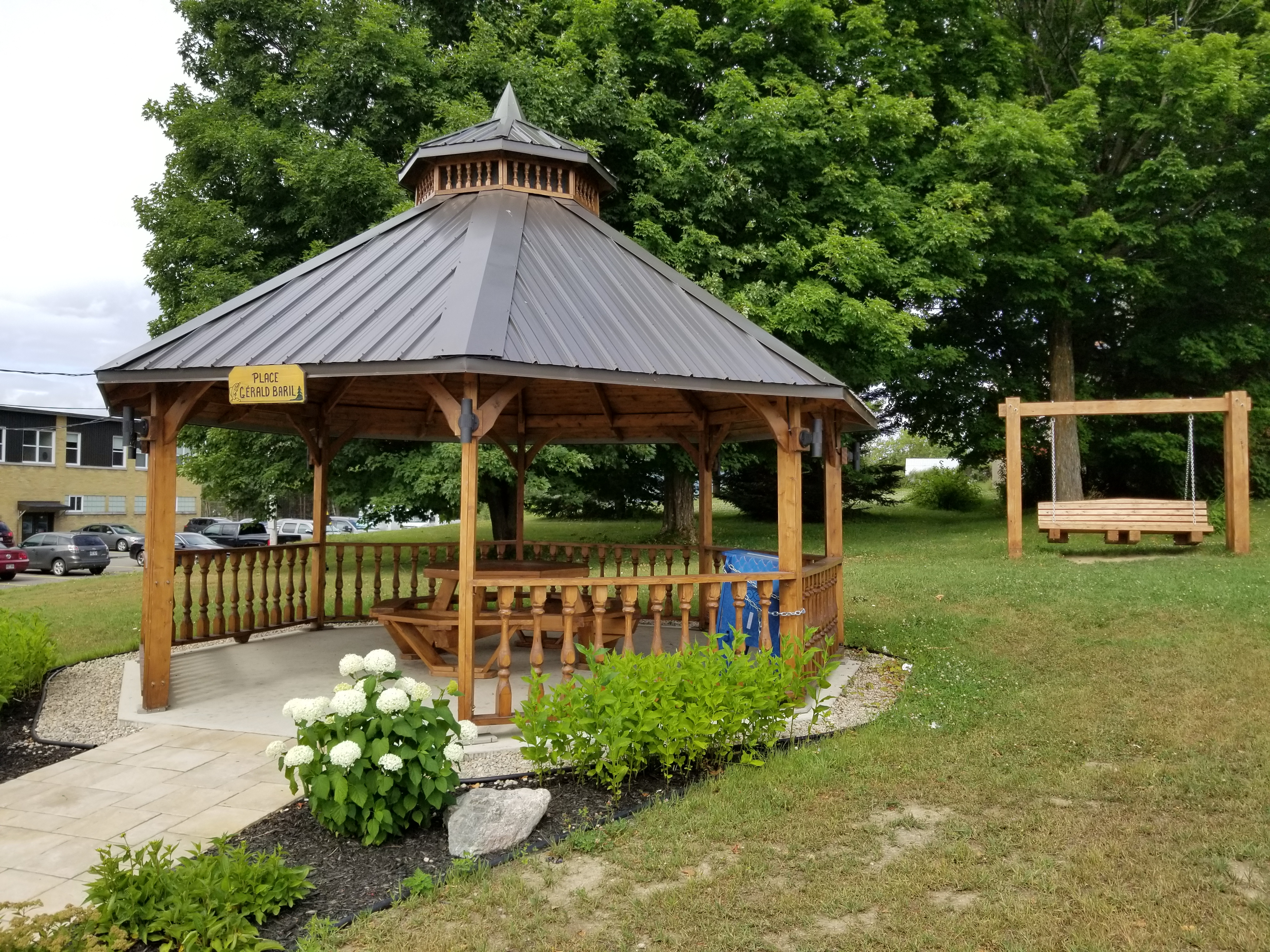
Kiosk set up in front of the presbytery, near the town hall.

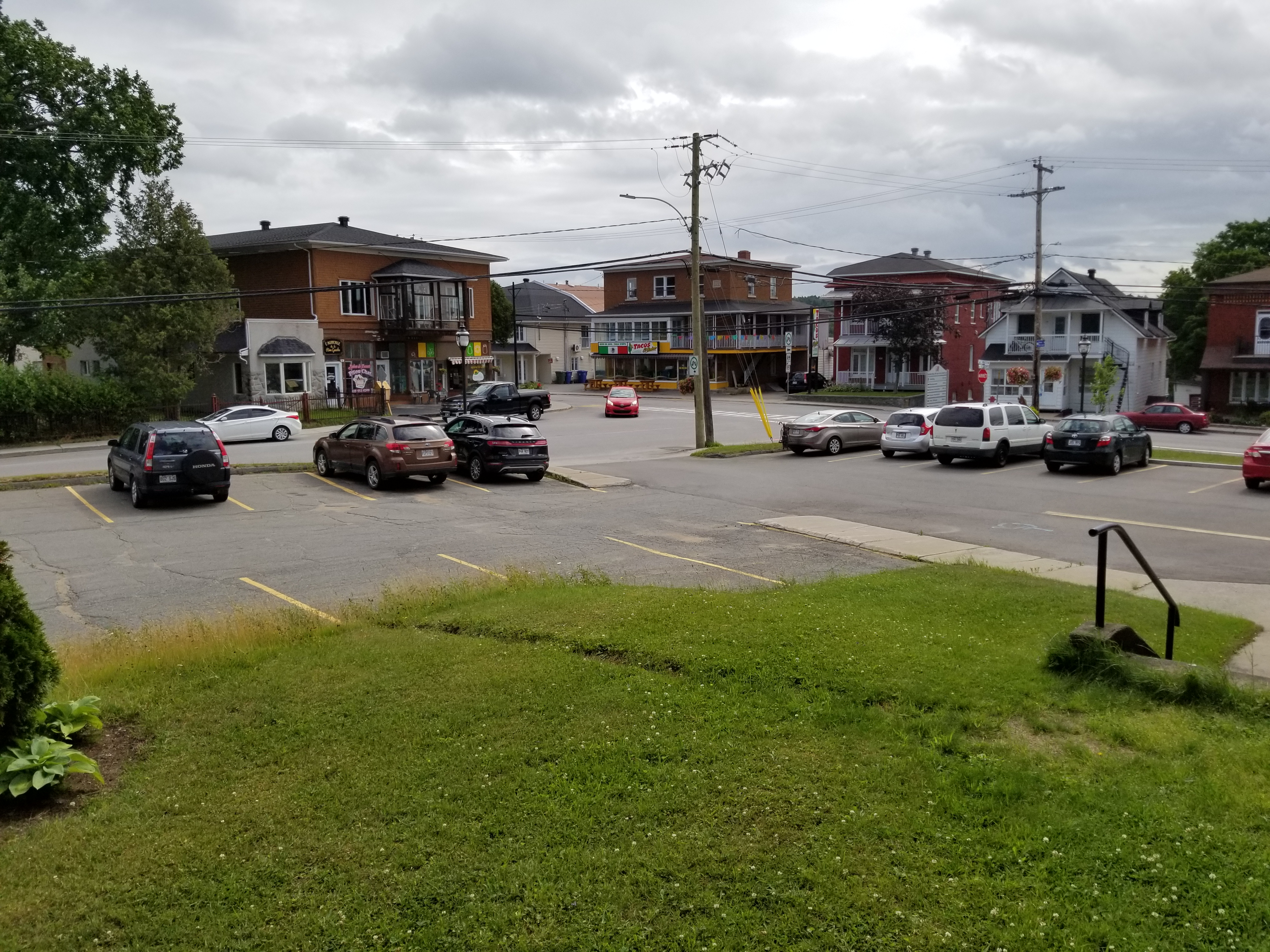
Center of the village of Sainte-Thècle (corners of Masson and Saint-Jacques) seen from the parterre of the church.

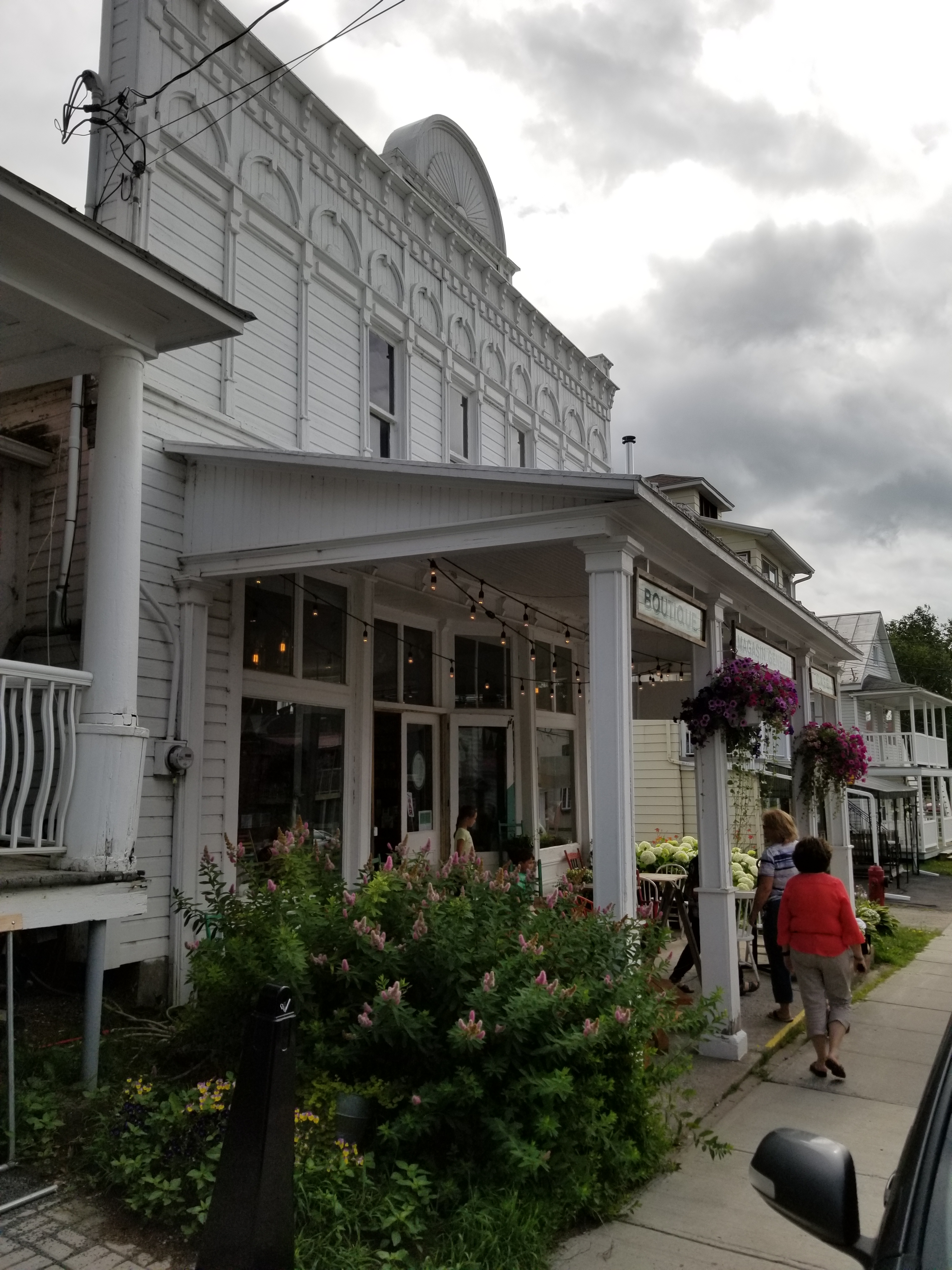
Front façade of the Café-Boutique "Aux Cinq Soeurs" on Masson Street, the former David Leblanc store.

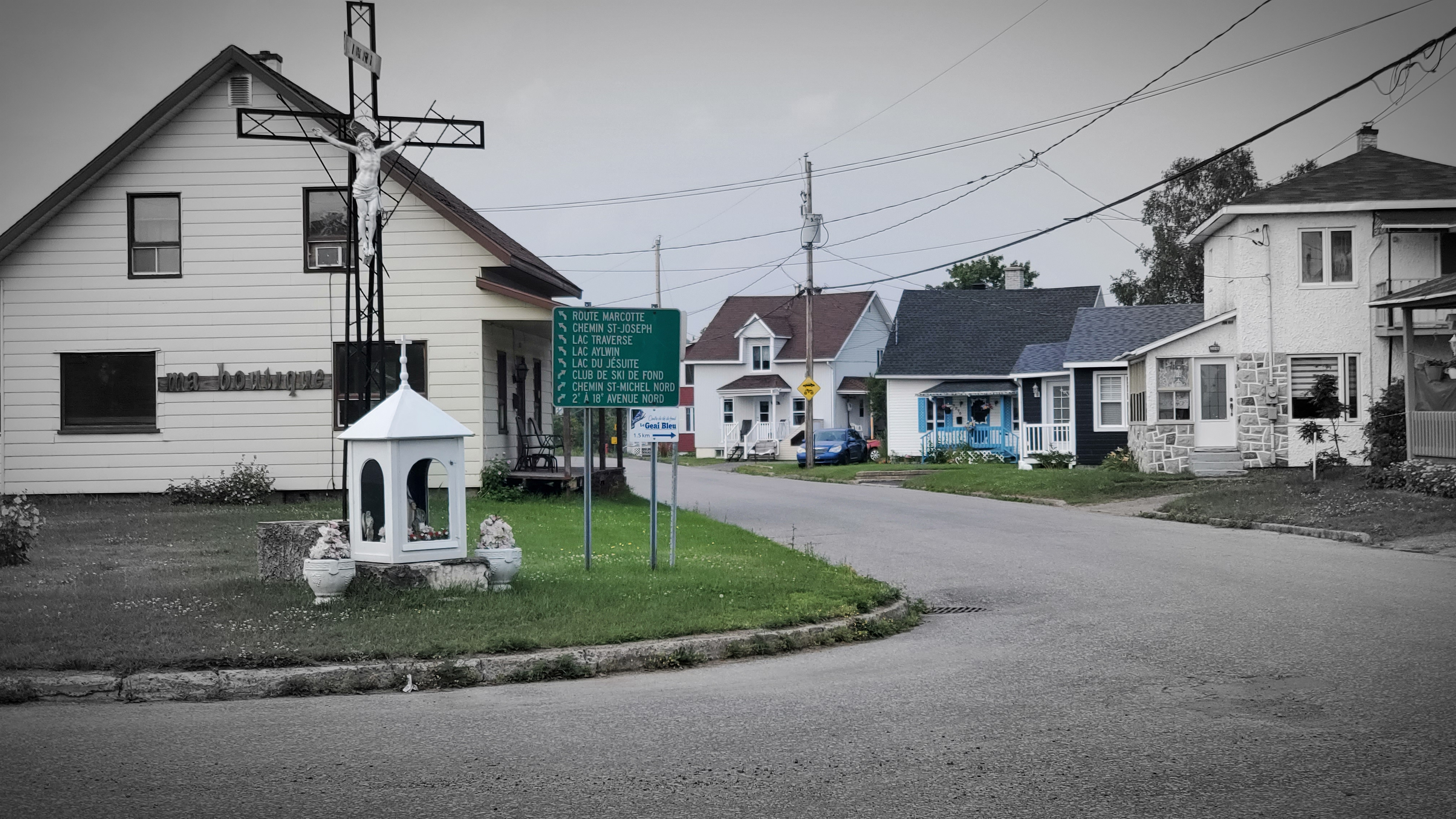
Way cross at the intersection of Chemin Saint-Michel-Nord and Route Marcotte.

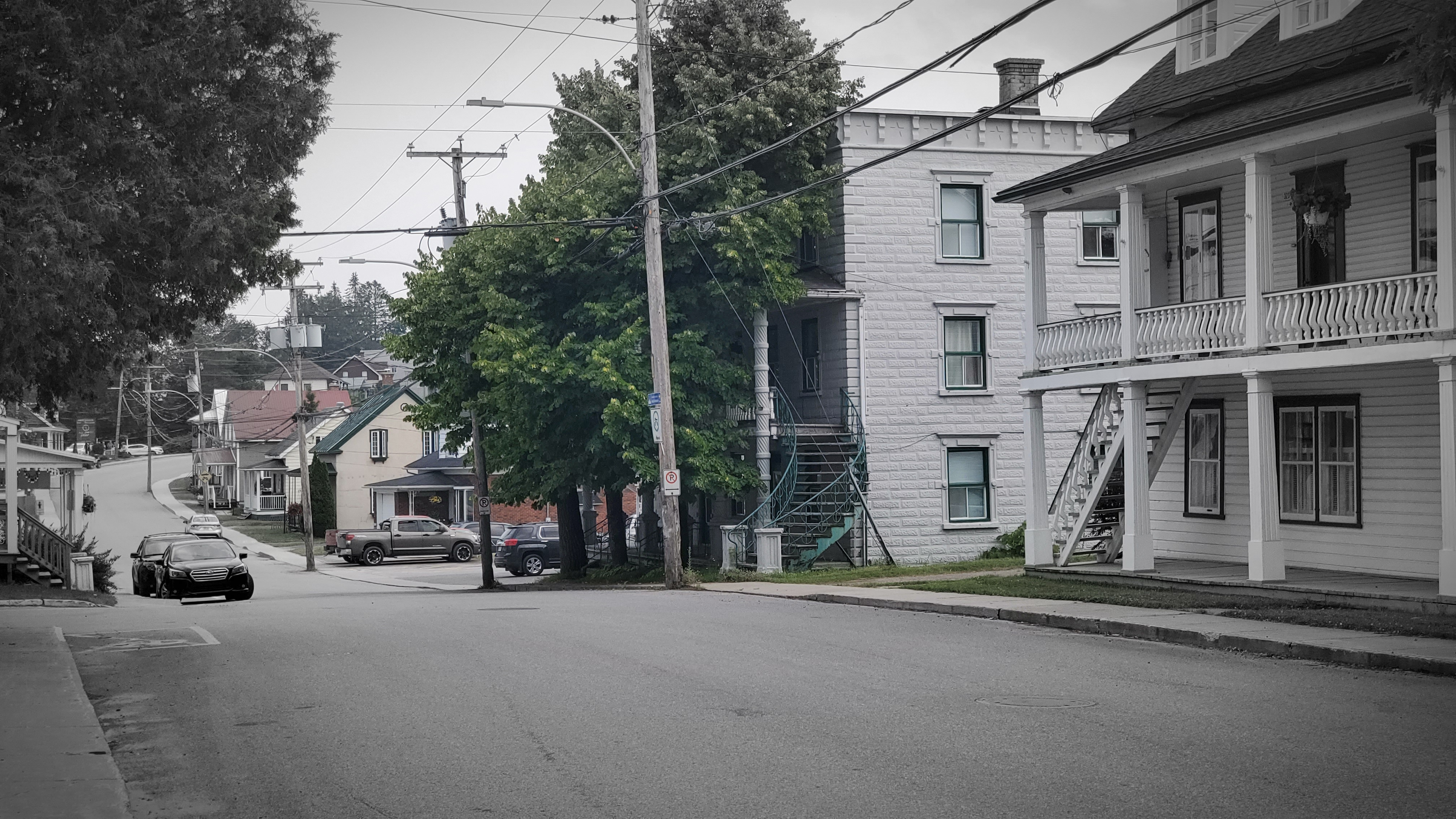
Masson street (corner of Saint-Jean street) in the lower part of the village.

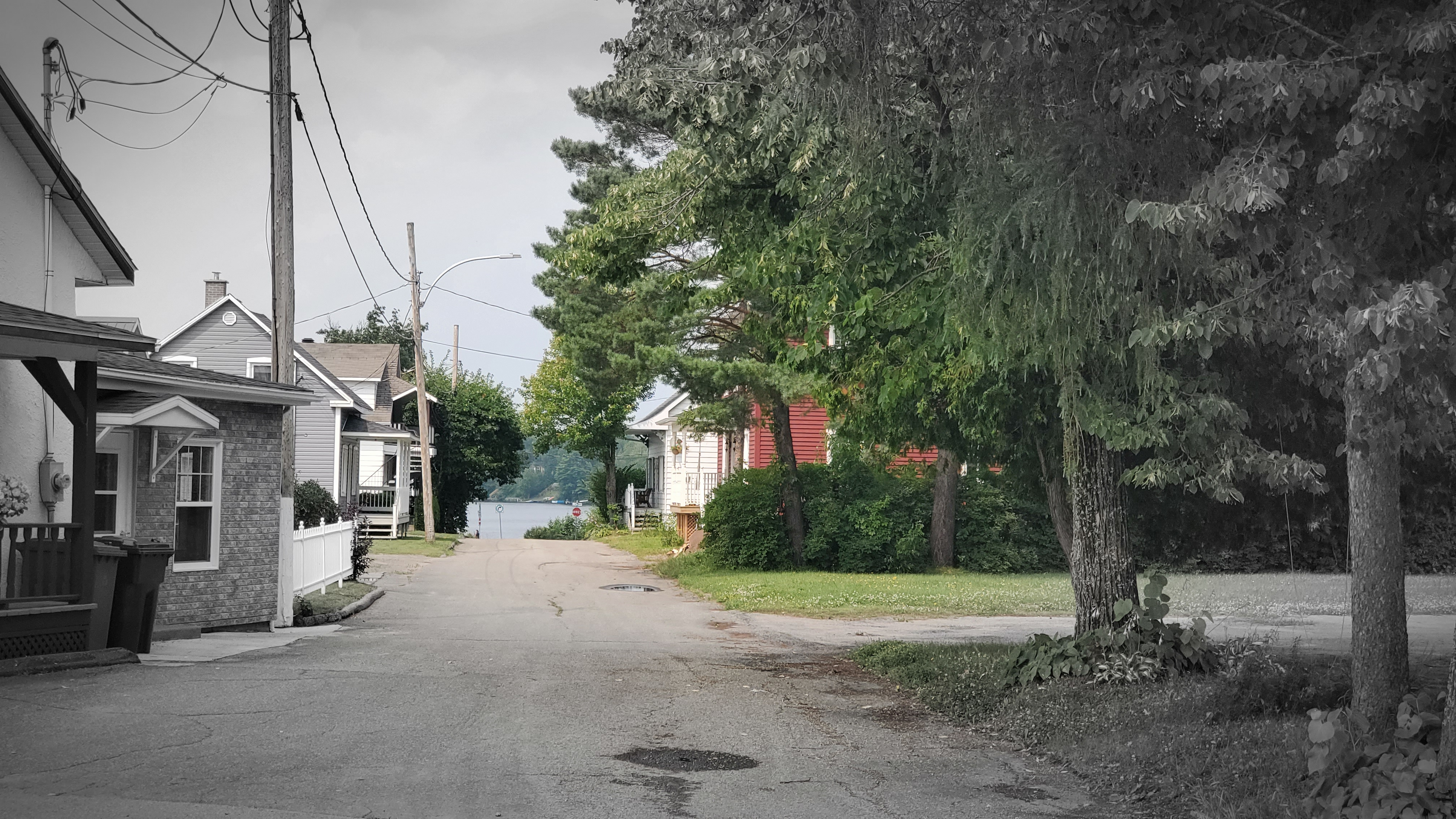
View of Tessier street in Sainte-Thècle (Quebec) from the intersection of Masson street in July 2021.

== Publishing about the history of Sainte-Thècle ==
1. "Répertoire des baptêmes de Sainte-Thècle (1869-2012)" (Directory of the baptisms of Sainte-Thècle), including 182 acts written in the registry of Saint-Tite (neighbor parish) from 1869 to 1880. Edited in French by "Fabrique de Sainte-Thècle". This book of 354 pages contains 11 135 baptisms.(in French)
- « Répertoire des naissances et des baptêmes de Sainte-Thècle (1880 à 1940)» (Directory of births and baptisms of Sainte-Thècle), edited in 2001, 262 pages. Author : Jacques Delisle.(in French)(Edition sold out)

2. "Répertoire des mariages de Sainte-Thècle - 1880 à 2004" (Directory of the marriages of Sainte-Thècle - From 1880 to 2004), published in French in 2005 by the "Fabrique de Sainte-Thècle", 52 pages. Authors: Yolande Saint-Amand, André B Veillette. Associates: Andréanne, Daniel, Gaétan and Lorraine Veillette.(in French)

- "Répertoire des mariages de Sainte-Thècle (on 1880 in 1973)" (Directory of the marriages of Sainte-Thècle), published in French in 1974 during the Centenary of Sainte-Thècle, 149 pages. Co-authors: Nicole V. Béland, Daniel Veillette, Gaétan Veillette, René Veillette and Yolande St-Amand-Veillette.(in French) (Edition sold out).
- First appendix " Annexe au Répertoire des mariages de Sainte-Thècle (1974-1979) (First "Appendix to the Directory of the marriages of Sainte-Thècle (1974-1979))", containing 169 marriages. Edited in French. Author: Yolande Saint-Amand-Veillette.(in French) (Edition sold out)
- Second appendix " Annexe au Répertoire des mariages de Sainte-Thècle (1974 à 2004) (Second Appendix to the Directory of the marriages of Sainte-Thècle (1974-2004))", published in French in 2005, 52 pages. Authors: Yolande Saint-Amand and André B Veillette.(in French)
- Third appendix " Annexe au Répertoire des mariages de Sainte-Thècle (1974 à 2004) (Third Appendix to the Directory of the marriages of Sainte-Thècle (1974-2004))", published in French in 2009, 56 pages. Authors: Yolande Saint-Amand and André B Veillette. Collaborator: Claude Naud.(in French)

3. "Obituaire - Lac-aux-Chicots-Sainte-Thècle de 1870 à 1975 (Obituary Lac-aux-Chicots-Sainte-Thècle from 1870 to 1975)", edited in French by "Éditions du bien public", published in 1976. Authors: Geneviève Leblanc and Marie-Ange B. Plamondon. 152 pages.(in French) (Edition sold out).

- First appendix entitled "Obituary Lac-aux-Chicots-Sainte-Thècle from 1975 to 1979", Edited in French by "Éditions du bien public", p. 153 - 176, published in 1980, by Geneviève Leblanc and Marie-Ange B. Plamondon. This appendix contains in particular the data of the census of 1895 written by the priest Michel E. Jannelle.(in French) (Edition sold out).
- The second appendix entitled "Obituary Lac-aux-Chicots-Sainte-Thècle from 1975 to 2003", p. 170 - 289.(in French) (Edition sold out)

4. Monograph of Sainte-Thècle Centenary entitled "Une ville du Nord, Saint-Thècle - Cent ans d'histoire" (A city of the North, Sainte-Thècle, Hundred years of history) - 1874-1974", Edited by "Éditions du bien public", 229 pages, published in French in March, 1974 during the festivities of the Centenary of Sainte-Thècle. Text: Dr Jean-René Marchand . Documentation: Charles Magnan. Associates: Michelle Trépanier and Father Étienne Morin, o.p.(in French)

5. Book "Sainte-Thècle - Comté de Champlain" (Sainte-Thècle - County of Champlain), containing the censuses of 1886, 1891, 1895, on 1896 and 1897 of Sainte-Thècle. Published in French in Trois-Rivières (Three Rivers) in 1987. 320 pages. Compiled by Brigitte Hamel, S.C.O.(in French)

6. "Des semailles aux glanures : répertoire des objets anciens de Ste-Thècle" (Sowings to glanures: directory of the antiques of Ste-Thècle). Texts writer, Odette St-Amand; supervised by Armande Rompré-St-Amand. Published in French by the "Sociocultural Committee of Ste-Thècle" (Comité socio-culturel de Sainte-Thècle), 1984, Arquienne printing office.(in French)

7. Book "Sainte-Thècle - Le temps d'une vie mémorable ... pendant un quart de siècle - 1935 à 1960" (Time for a memorable life... for a quarter of a century - from 1935 to 1960). Author: Fernand Cloutier. 295 pages. Published in French in August 2012 by the author.(in French)

8. Book "Sainte-Thècle - Familles du Lac Travers 1955 (Rang St-Joseph)" (Sainte-Thècle - Families of Lac Travers 1955 (Rang St-Joseph)), by Fernand Cloutier, 2018, 46 pages - Photograph: Claude Naud. Published in 2018 by the author.(in French)

9. Book "Sainte-Thècle - Familles "Haut du Lac Sud" 1950 (Rang St-Pierre Sud)" (Sainte-Thècle - Families "Haut du Lac Sud" 1950 (Rang St-Pierre Sud)), par Fernand Cloutier, 2019, 96 pages - Collaborator: Myriam Bédard, editing and graphic design. Published in 2019 by the author.(in French)

10. Book "Sainte-Thècle - Familles "Nord du lac" 1950 (Rang St-Michel Nord)" (Sainte-Thècle - Families "North of the lake" 1950 (Rang St-Michel North)), par Fernand Cloutier, 2020, 98 pages - Collaborator: Myriam Bédard, editing and graphic design. Published in 2020 by author.(in French)

11. Book "Sainte-Thècle - Familles "Bas du Lac Sud" 1950 (Rang St-Michel Sud)" (Sainte-Thècle - Families "Bas du Lac Sud" 1950 (Rang St-Michel Sud)), par Fernand Cloutier, 2020, 82 pages - Collaborator: Myriam Bédard, editing and graphic design. Published in 2020 by author.(in French)

12. Book "Sainte-Thècle - 1950 - Rang St-Thomas Sud" (Sainte-Thècle - 1950 - Rang St-Thomas South), by Fernand Cloutier, 2019, 94 pages - Collaborator: Myriam Bédard, editing and graphic design. Published in 2019 by the author.(in French)

13. Book "Sainte-Thècle - 1950 - Rang St-Thomas Nord" (Sainte-Thècle - 1950 - Rang St-Thomas North), by Fernand Cloutier, 2020, 139 pages - Collaborators: members of Fernand Gravel and Louiselle Lefebvre's family. Collaborator: Myriam Bédard, editing and graphic design. Published in 2020 by the author.(in French)

== See also ==
- Maxime Masson
- Rivière des Envies
- Pierre-Paul River
- Tawachiche River
- Tawachiche West River
- Batiscan River
- Batiscanie, Quebec
- Missionary Lake
- Lake Jesuit
- Lake Traverse (Mékinac)
- Archange Lake (Mékinac)
- Croche Lake (Sainte-Thècle)
- Lejeune Township
- Mékinac Regional County Municipality
- County of Laviolette (electoral district)
- County of Champlain (federal electoral district), old federal electoral district
