= Alphée Saint-Amand =

Mayor of Quebec, Canada (1903-1983)

Alphée Saint-Amand (April 10, 1903 in Sainte-Thècle, Quebec, Canada - April 20, 1983 in Sainte-Thècle) was a mayor and businessman in Quebec. He was married on 19 September 1922 in the church of Sainte-Thècle in Zénaïde Piché, and he and his wife had nine children, three of whom were born in Abitibi and the others in Sainte-Thècle.

== Biographical Summary ==
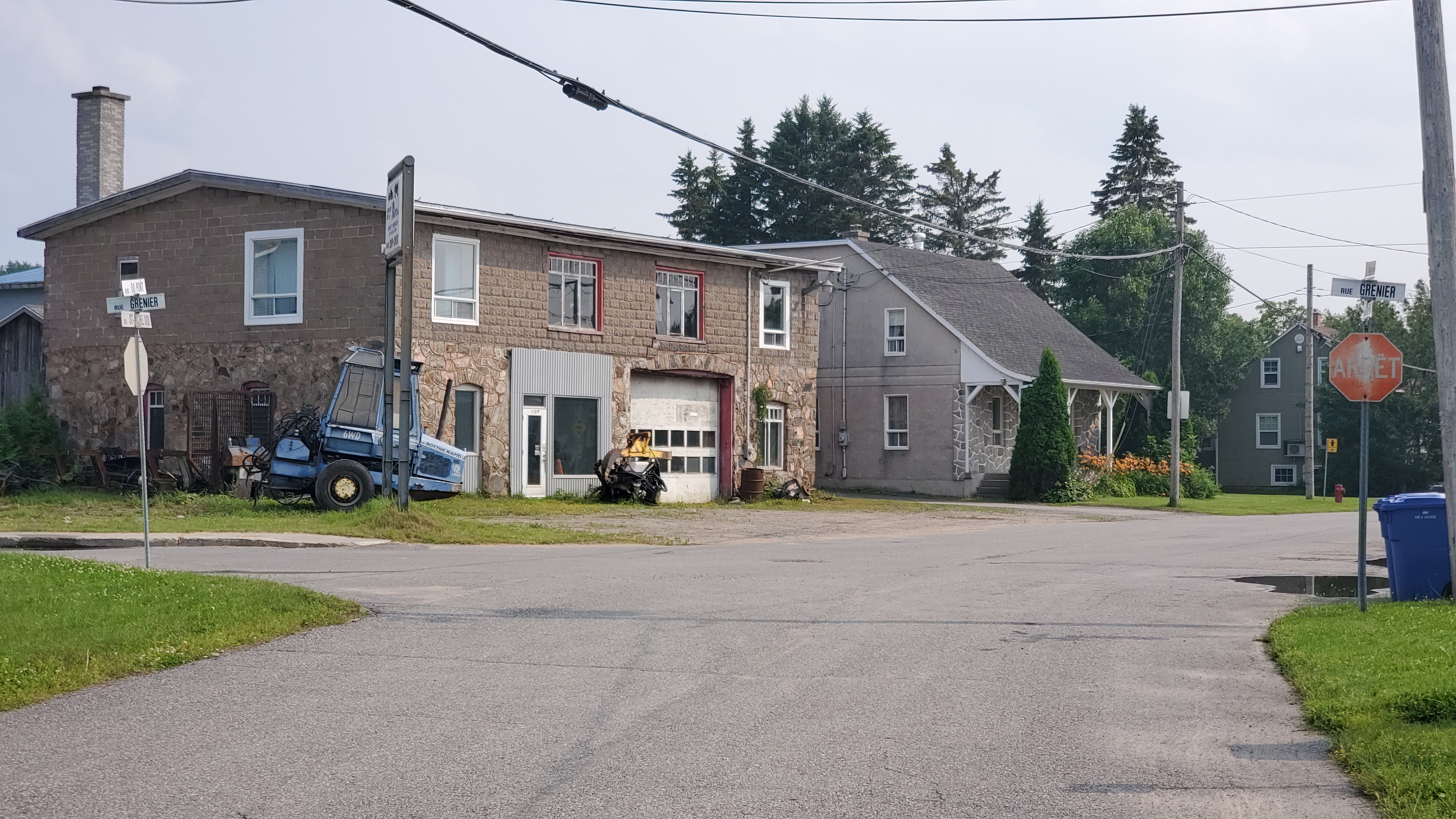
Garage on rue Du Pont, in Sainte-Thècle

"Alphée Saint-Amand lived in Abitibi from 1922 to 1927. He cleared a lot at Saint-Janvier-de-Chazel and is a baker at Saint-Judes-d'Authier. He went on business to Sainte-Thècle in 1928. He operated a garage, a plumbing service, a funeral service, an ambulance service, a furniture business and a sewing workshop. Moreover, he was mayor of the parish of Sainte-Thècle and possessed several buildings in the region. Zénaïde spent his youth at Sainte-Thècle, at Saint-Thomas row, and seconded his husband in all his undertakings. She was secretary, collaborator and even head of the sewing workshop. She was president of UCFR of Sainte-Thècle."

After their marriage, the couple Saint-Amand-Piché left by train in 1923 to settle on a lot of row 10 in Macamic (Chazel sector) in Abitibi, with his brothers: Joséphat, Ernest, Odina, Donat and Albert Saint-Amand. Alphée St-Amand was the first baker of St-Judes d'Authier in 1924.

The couple returns in 1927 to Sainte-Thècle where Alphée St-Amand starts in 1928 a car garage in Sainte-Thècle at the back of the old wood shop Zéphirin Fournier, on the site of the old chapel of the village of below. In 1941, a new, all-stone garage was built on the same site. He also became a plumber and tinsmith.

Around 1932, Alphée became fire chief of both municipalities (village and parish). In 1934, Alphée St-Amand began the service of funeral director; he exercised this role for 40 years. In 1936, he made his first automobile-hearse by modifying a Nash Lafayette 1929 car.

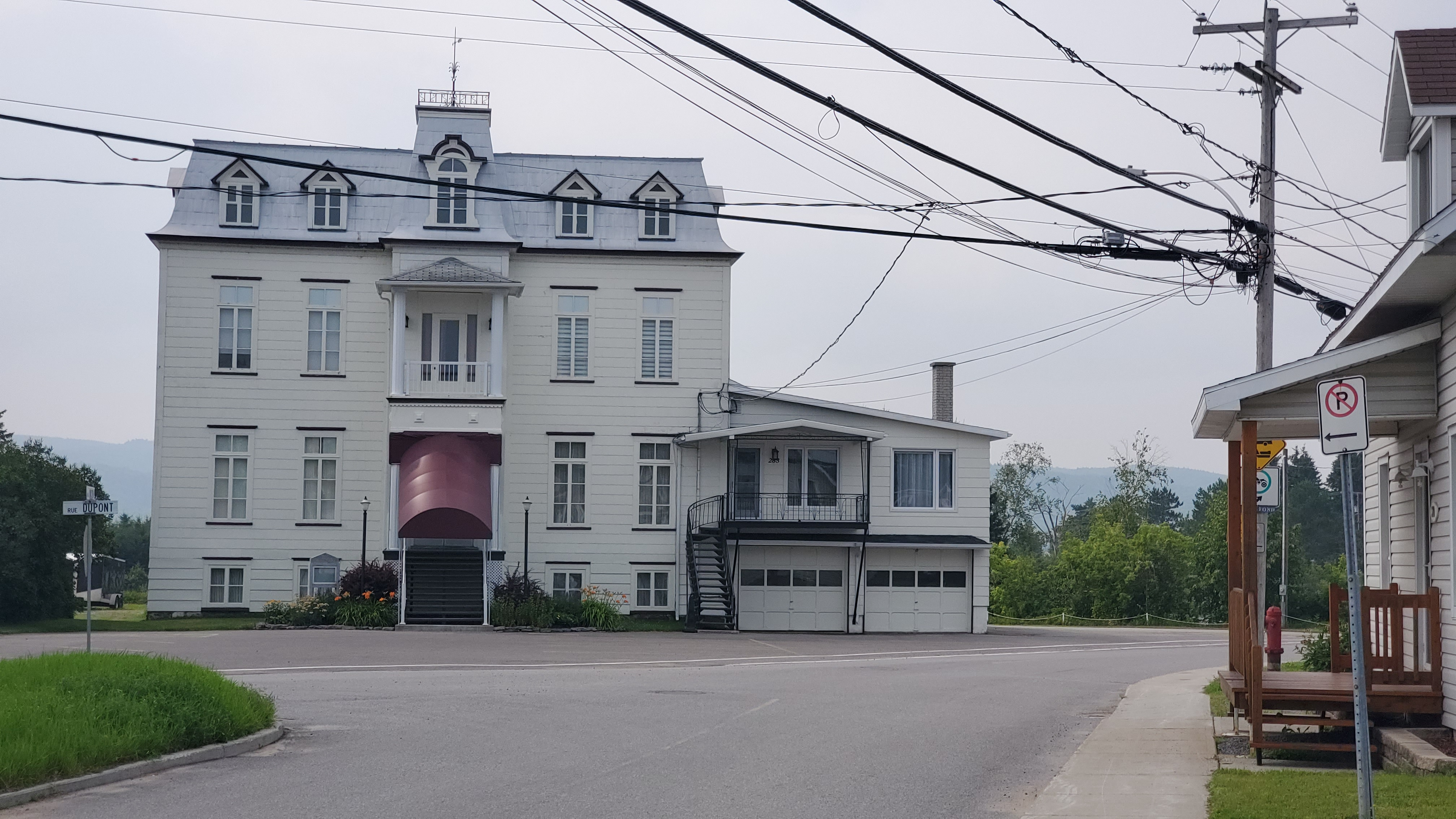
Ex-school no. 1 rue Du Pont, in Sainte-Thècle which becomes a sewing workshop and funeral home

Alphée operated a sewing workshop from 1950 to 1966, at first on the second floor of the garage. In 1954 he acquired the old school no. 1 of rue Dupont of the "Commission scolaire de Sainte-Thècle" (School Board) to make a sewing workshop (in the basement), a linoleum shop on the 1st floor, the funeral home on the 2nd floor.

After an experience as municipal councilor since 1945, Alphée is named the 20th mayor of the parish municipality of Sainte-Thècle. He completed three mandates until 1957, when the "village d'en bas" (village from below) merged with the municipality of the village.
