= Maxime Masson =

Canadian catholic priest (1867–1960)

Maxime Masson (October 15, 1867, in Saint-Justin – October 2, 1960) was a Roman Catholic priest. He was the main architect of religious buildings in the town of Sainte-Thècle, located in Mauricie, in the province of Quebec. He was pastor of the Sainte-Thècle parish for 52 years. During that time, he was the main coordinator for the construction of the church from 1903 to 1905, as well as the rectory and other buildings on the lot of the Fabrique de Sainte-Thècle. He was instrumental in the erection of the monastery (couvent in French) in 1912, led by the religious community Daughters of Jesus ("Filles de Jésus" in French), and the erection in 1939 of the first college run by the religious Brothers of St. Gabriel (Frères de Saint-Gabriel in French).

== Craftsman talent ==
He designed and built including the magnificent calvary (in 1935) located in the cemetery land, a cement lion in 1939 located on the outside of the church and the paintings on the ceiling of the sacristy. He carved the Stations of the Cross erected in the parish cemetery of Sainte-Thècle from stone that came from France. He performed extensive embellishment work such as cement flowerpots, cement balls, the steps, and water fountain in front of the church and the rectory. He made a carved wood clock, the base of which resembles the base of the church towers and the high altar.

== Baptism statistics ==
Masson celebrated 2497 baptisms recorded in the registers of Sainte-Thècle, between February 7, 1903, and April 30, 1955.

== First car ==
He owned one of the first automobiles in the history of Sainte-Thècle, a Ford Model T 1911.

== 1938 hurricane ==
His biggest test was the collapse of the two church towers during the hurricane of August 3, 1938.

== Studies and priest appointment ==
Born on October 15, 1867, in Saint-Justin (Maskinongé County, Quebec, Canada), he was the son of Amable Masson, farmer and Zoe Paquin. He studied classics at Séminaire Saint-Joseph de Trois-Rivières and theology at the Grand Seminary Trois-Rivières. He was ordained on July 8, 1894, in the chapel of the Seminary Trois-Rivières by Bishop L.F. Lafleche.

At the beginning of his priesthood, Masson was vicar of the parish of Saint-Justin (1894–1899), at Saint-Léon-le-Grand (1902), at Saint-Timothée of Hérouxville (1902–1903), before being assigned as pastor to Sainte-Thècle, on February 6, 1903.

Masson was the first president of the School board of the village of Sainte-Thècle from July 19, 1915, to April 14, 1947. He finished his course in Sainte-Thècle on July 1, 1955.

== Local recognition ==
He was chaplain of the movement "Catholic Action" and pious associations. Two toponymic designations were assigned in recognition of his work life at Sainte-Thècle: School Masson (i.e. old boys' school) and Masson Street which connects the lower village and the village of the church. He died on October 2, 1960, and was buried in the cemetery of Sainte-Thècle.

== See also ==
- Sainte-Thècle, Quebec
