= Georges W. Veillette =

Business man (1918-1993)

- Born: April 22, 1918
- Died: February 19, 1993 (aged 74); CHSJ of Trois-Rivières
- Occupation: Business man in mattress industry
- Notable work: President and founder of Matelas Suprême inc of Saint-Narcisse

Georges W Veillette (1918-1993) was the founder of the mattress company Matelas Suprême Inc in Saint-Narcisse, in Mauricie, in Quebec, in Canada. Several companies working in complementarity or as suppliers of Matelas Suprême have established themselves in Saint-Narcisse in the concept of industrial cluster.

== Starting in business ==
Georges Veillette made his early entry into the workforce, first helping his father Welly Veillette (married to Alphonsine Massicotte) who operated a demonstration fruit and vegetable garden; agricultural products were sold on weekends at the Trois-Rivières market. In winter, Georges was a lumberjack, carter or assistant cook in the forest sites of Haute-Mauricie. From the age of 19, he worked 3 or 4 years in the iron and rag recovery business.

Georges Veillette and Georgette Veillette were married on October 19, 1942 in Saint-Narcisse. They had 10 children, from 1943 to 1955. His children got involved in family businesses.

== Founder of Matelas Suprême inc ==
In 1944, he himself invented a filleting machine for the manufacture of mattresses, while he remained in the Second Row in Saint-Narcisse. The first floor of their house served as the first mattress manufacturing plant; then the old barn was used for the business.

In 1945, Georges Veillette built with his workers a first building in the village of Saint-Narcisse, the second factory. They made four or five mattresses a day. In December 1945, a first fire destroyed the facilities that he rebuilt in the spring of 1946. In the winter of 1946, Georges Veillette himself transported the mattresses made for delivery to customers at Lac-à-la-Tortue. In the winter of 1946–1947, he had to open the winter roads between Saint-Narcisse and Saint-Louis-de-France.

On April 12, 1952, a second fire completely destroyed the factory. He rebuilt at the beginning of 1953. A third fire occurred on December 2, 1959; the factory was then rebuilt in cement blocks. In 1956, the company adopted the corporate name of "Matelas Suprême inc".

In 1964, a modern 71,000 square foot (6,596 m2) Matelas Suprême Inc. factory was built in the village of Saint-Narcisse. Together with his team, he builds his own concrete mixer truck and the crane used to hoist construction materials. Matelas Suprême Inc operated with a production capacity of 700 mattresses per day. The products manufactured were delivered to the Maritimes, Quebec, Ontario and Western Canada. In the mid-1970s, Matelas Suprême hired around 100 workers and manufactured around 100,000 mattresses and box springs per year. Its market share was then between 18 and 20% of the Quebec market. In 1973, the company expanded to 125,000 sq. Ft. it. to launch the production division of upholstered furniture (armchairs, sofas, sofas, etc.). In 1969, Matelas Suprême was acquired by the Zodiac group; the new name becomes “Supreme.” The Saint-Narcisse plant closed in 1981. In 1988, Sealy Canada acquired Matelas Centurion of Saint-Narcisse.

== Feutre National Inc ==
In the 1960s, businessman Georges Veillette acquired a franchise granted by an American engineer, allowing the manufacture of Flex-Xel, at the time, a revolutionary product in the mattress and padding market. and underlay. In 1969, Georges Veillette built the 75,000 square foot plant for the activities of Feutre National Inc in the village of Saint-Narcisse. This company, which was founded in 1961 and employed around 30 employees, manufactured cotton and synthetic felt. The products from this factory were sold to the largest mattress and padding manufacturers in Canada and the United States.

== Other companies ==
In 1964, Georges Veillette built the Motel Robinson, on a peninsula bypassed by the course of the Batiscan River. Then, he set up a campground with 400 sites. He had this business in 1976 when it welcomed up to 10,000 visitors a year. The tercentenary of the Veillet/te d'Amérique was celebrated on this site by 2000 participants on August 13–14, 1988. In 1973, Georges acquired a farm of 50 arpents and 10 horned animals; then he acquired other lots around. Finally, he sold in 1979, when the farm had 400 arpents and 325 horned animals.

== Notes and references ==
- Monograph "Saint-Narcisse 1804-1979", by Father Jean Gagnon, p. 258-260, Éditions du Bien Public, section “Matelas Suprême inc”.
