= Omer Veillette =

Canadian businessman in truck transport (1896-1970)

- Born: August 12, 1896
- Died: May 20, 1970 (aged 73)
- Occupations: Business man in transport industry, La Tuque mayor
- Years active: 1920-1968
- Known for: Mayor of La Tuque
- Notable work: President and founder of Veillette Transport Cie Ltée

Omer Veillette (1896–1970) was a Canadian businessman in the trucking industry, founding president of Veillette Transport, owner of Autobus Veillette Ltée, mayor of La Tuque and promoter of the development of a road link between La Tuque and lac Saint-Jean. Omer Veillette married in 1920 at Hervey-Jonction to Marie-Louise Hardy.

The son of Napoléon Veillette and Marie-Anne Massicotte, Omer Veillette was a business figure in Haute-Mauricie, involved in the trucking industry, regional development projects, and local social initiatives.

== Start up in business ==
In 1920, at the age of 23, immediately after his marriage to Mary-Louise, Omer and his wife left Hervey-Jonction to go to La Tuque where Omer worked for 11 years at the Brown Corporation, which subsequently became the Compagnie Internationale de Papier. After his day's work, Omer delivered firewood with a horse and cart. In addition, he sold trucks, cars and furniture. During the early days of the Great Depression, Omer bought a truck in order to deliver firewood to La Tuque more quickly and provide moving services. The son of Napoléon Veillette and Marie-Anne Massicotte, Omer Veillette was a business figure in Haute-Mauricie, involved in the trucking industry, regional development projects, and local social initiatives.

In 1931, he stopped working at the Brown Corporation in order to focus on his other business interests. In 1933, he began to transport by truck over long distances after obtaining his license from the Commission des services publics du Québec. At the time, Route 19 (later referred to as Route 155) was gravel and had large hills in many segments on the banks of the Saint-Maurice River. Two drivers were then required per truck. To meet the needs of the market, this transport company had to hire workers, including drivers and mechanics. Omer often drove company trucks himself. Then the children of working age took turns supporting the company. Marie-Louise Hardy, wife of Omer, was actively involved in the office work of the transport company.

In 1931, Omer Veillette was one of the radio furniture distributors of Radio Fada, an American brand distributed in Canada by the "Fada Radio of Canada Limited". This radio instrument integrated into a stylish wooden cabinet and offering a better musical sound and voice for the time, was used in particular in private homes.

== Veillette Transport Cie Ltée ==
The company Veillette Transport Cie Ltée was incorporated under provincial jurisdiction on December 21, 1950, by Omer Veillette, trucker from La Tuque, Paul Chartrain lawyer from Sillery, as well as MM. Robert, Émile and Jean Létourneau, all three merchants from Quebec. The object of the company was to trade in motor vehicles and in valets, as well as to carry on the business of general contractor. The company's head office is at La Tuque. This company was voluntarily dissolved in 1995. Omer was one of the first members and one of the pioneers of the Truck Association.

The large warehouse of the company "Veillette Transport Cie Ltée" located on boulevard Ducharme (route 19), at the southern entrance to the town of La Tuque, contained 16,000 feet (4,876.80 m) and a land area of 80,000 feet (24,384.00 m). This warehouse was officially opened in August 1958. Since December 1957, this warehouse has been housed in a spacious and very modern building for the time. This transportation company offers regular truck transportation between Quebec City, Montreal, Trois-Rivières, Shawinigan, Grand'Mère, La Tuque; and occasionally with the village of Sanmaur and the Barrage La Loutre. Cie Veillette transport Ltée then had 40 units, including 27 motor vehicles and 13 trailers. Mechanical maintenance of the trucks was done entirely at this warehouse, with a few exceptions. Lucien Veillette, mechanic by trade, was then in charge of inspection and repairs with a team and modern tools for the time.

== Road linking La Tuque and the lac Saint-Jean ==
In 1955, with the support of another Latuquois Auguste Dubois, Omer Veillette assigned some of his workers and his equipment to build a road between La Tuque and lac Saint-Jean, via the village of Lac-Bouchette. This road construction initiative was carried out without government or municipal compensation. Thus, on a Sunday in February 1955, a caravan of about fifty cars could then make the trip in about ten hours between La Tuque and Lac Bouchette. The purpose of this caravan was to sensitize the provincial government of the Prime Minister Maurice Duplessis to invest in this vital route for the interregional economy.

In the fall of 1962, a summit meeting took place halfway, either at Van Bruyssel, between the leaders of the Mauricie and Roberval regions, with the provincial authorities. Emphasis was placed on the urgency of finalizing the development of this road link (about 20 miles (32 km) still to be done), the estimated cost of which was $1 million. Nevertheless, the government allocates budgetary credits in stages; which would then lead to the completion of the construction of this road only in 1965 or 1966. Regional organizations had come together to speed up the project by putting pressure on the government. In the meantime, the delay in completion means making a big detour via roads developed by logging companies.

In 1964, Omer Veillette announced that his company Autobus Veillette Ltée was planning to launch a bus transportation service between La Tuque and Roberval. After several steps, he had obtained a commitment from the provincial government to take care of the maintenance of the entire Route 19, or 110 miles, between La Tuque and Roberval. Previously, Consolidated Paper had taken on the responsibility of maintaining this 27 miles (43 km) route. Omer Veillette then anticipated a ridership of between 600 and 800 trucks per week.

== Mayor of La Tuque ==
Veillette was appointed alderman of district 2 in La Tuque from 1937 to 1941 and again from 1942 to 1944. He served as mayor of La Tuque from October 1944 to July 1947.

On April 25, 1944, while Omer Veillette was alderman, and on Oct. 31, 1944, when Omer Veillette was acting as new mayor, an advertising page in Le Nouvelliste indicated that the town of La Tuque was the first town in the province of Quebec to achieve its objective of selling Victory Bonds to support Canada's war effort in World War II. On May 4, 1945, when Omer Veillette was mayor, the town of La Tuque reiterated its support for the campaign to sell the Victory Bonds.

== Community activism ==
From 1964 to 1968, Omer Veillette was appointed Grand Chevalier of the 1887 Council of the Knights of Columbus in La Tuque. He joined the 4th degree of the 1887 Knights of Columbus Council; he was appointed Deputy Grand Chevalier. He was involved on the Council's executive committee in the purchase of the "Community Club" which was owned by Canadian International Paper. He personally contributed to cover part of the interest on the building.

Omer Veillette was a member of the curling club, president of the Loups de La Tuque in 1968-1969, honorary president of the same hockey club in 1970 and president of the La Ligue club. In addition, he was a churchwarden in La Tuque and a collector for Sunday masses. Omer has held many other community positions.

In 1963, Omer was president of the 5th Intermediate Classic of canoes of the Mauricie.

== See also ==
- La Tuque
- Hervey-Jonction
