= Jacques J. Bouchard =

Jacques J. Bouchard (2 September 1907 – 26 January 1982 in Amos, Quebec) was called to the Order of Canada on 17 December 1973 and inducted as a member in Ottawa on 15 October 1975. The records of the Order contain the following mention: (translation) "Businessman from Amos in recognition of his contribution to the industrial and social development of Northwestern Quebec."

== Biography ==
Born in Sainte-Geneviève-de-Batiscan, a few miles east of Trois-Rivières, in the province of Quebec, Canada, Jacques J. Bouchard was the first son born to Arthur Bouchard, tailor and Florina Baribeau sister of Jean-Louis Baribeau, last president of Quebec Legislative Council. He is typical of the spirit and determination of his generation of young French-Canadians. After his commercial course at Frères du Sacré-Coeur in Victoriaville, he leaves at 16 for the new frontier of his time, the Abitibi region in Northwestern Quebec. His first job is as a clerk in an insurance broker office, of which he becomes sole owner less than 10 years later.

His unusual (for the times) knowledge of English allows him to participate in the highly lucrative mining insurance business during the mining booms of the 1930s,(Malartic, Cadillac and Noranda). He is also secretary-treasurer of the Amos Board of Trade, member of the Canadian: institute of Mining and Metallurgy and the Prospectors and Developers Association. In the early 1950s, he started with Frank Blair Jr Abitibi Telephone Inc. which territory covered the newly discovered Matagami mining district.

In 1942, he was a victim of aneurysm in the brain which made him totally blind. He was successfully operated on by the renowned neurosurgeon Wilder Penfield who injected a then revolutionary radioactive isotope to locate the failing artery. A shrewd political organizer, he participates from the beginning to the odyssey of Maurice Duplessis and the Union Nationale party for which he remains an Abitibi mainstay until his death. Enlightened nationalist, he joins the Progressive Conservative Party at the federal level. There he meets and befriends John Bracken, George A. Drew and especially John Diefenbaker. He is chosen to be an honorary pallbearer at Mr. Diefenbaker's state funeral in Ottawa in August 1979. President of the Quebec wing of the Progressive Conservative Party in 1964 he also becomes vice president of the national party later that year. He is a delegate to all party conventions from 1938 to 1967, where he seconded Mr. Diefenbaker's last nomination.

A devout Catholic, he is active from 1940 to 1946 as president of the Abitibi Antituberculosis League and he presides over the construction of a Sanatorium for tuberculosis victims in Macamic (1947–50). He presides the Welfare Service of the diocese of Amos in 1957, and acts as president of the Finance Committee of the Catholic Scouts Mouvement for the diocese for nearly three decades (1944–1970). President of the association of ex-students of Victoriaville, he was a 4th degree member of the Knights of Columbus chapter 2218, and president of the Rotary Club of Amos which conferred him a Paul Harris fellow award.

His Involvement with Rotary International arouses his interest to the world at large, which he visits before it becomes trendy to do so. His main trips took him around the world in 1952, to Formosa and the Philippines in 1954, Hong Kong, Singapore and Indonesia in 1957, Polynesia, New Zealand and Australia in 1967. He retired from his insurance business in 1966, bought the farm he always wanted on the banks of his beloved Harricana River and continued to travel mainly in the United States and Mexico until his death on 26 January 1982. Amos gives him a memorable funeral, co celebrated in the cathedral by a bishop and 9 priests in the presence of Joe Clark the Leader of the Opposition in Ottawa and many local personalities.

He was admitted as a knight of the Sovereign Military Order of Malta on 16 November 1970.

On 28 June 1933 he married in Amos, Yvonne DeVreese (died 2003) who gave him 2 sons, Yves (died 2002) and Pierre.
