= Laurent Naud =

Canadian businessman

Laurent Naud (September 11, 1909 to Sainte-Thècle, Quebec, Canada – March 4, 1992 to Sainte-Thècle) was a Quebec businessman (Canada) operating a lumber factory and a building materials business in Sainte-Thècle.

Laurent Naud began working full-time for his father's business at the age of eight. Among his public implications, Laurent Naud was a member for many years in the local fire brigade. He also served for four terms as municipal councilor in the village. He participated in disaster relief at the Canadian Red Cross Society, Grandmother and Region Section.

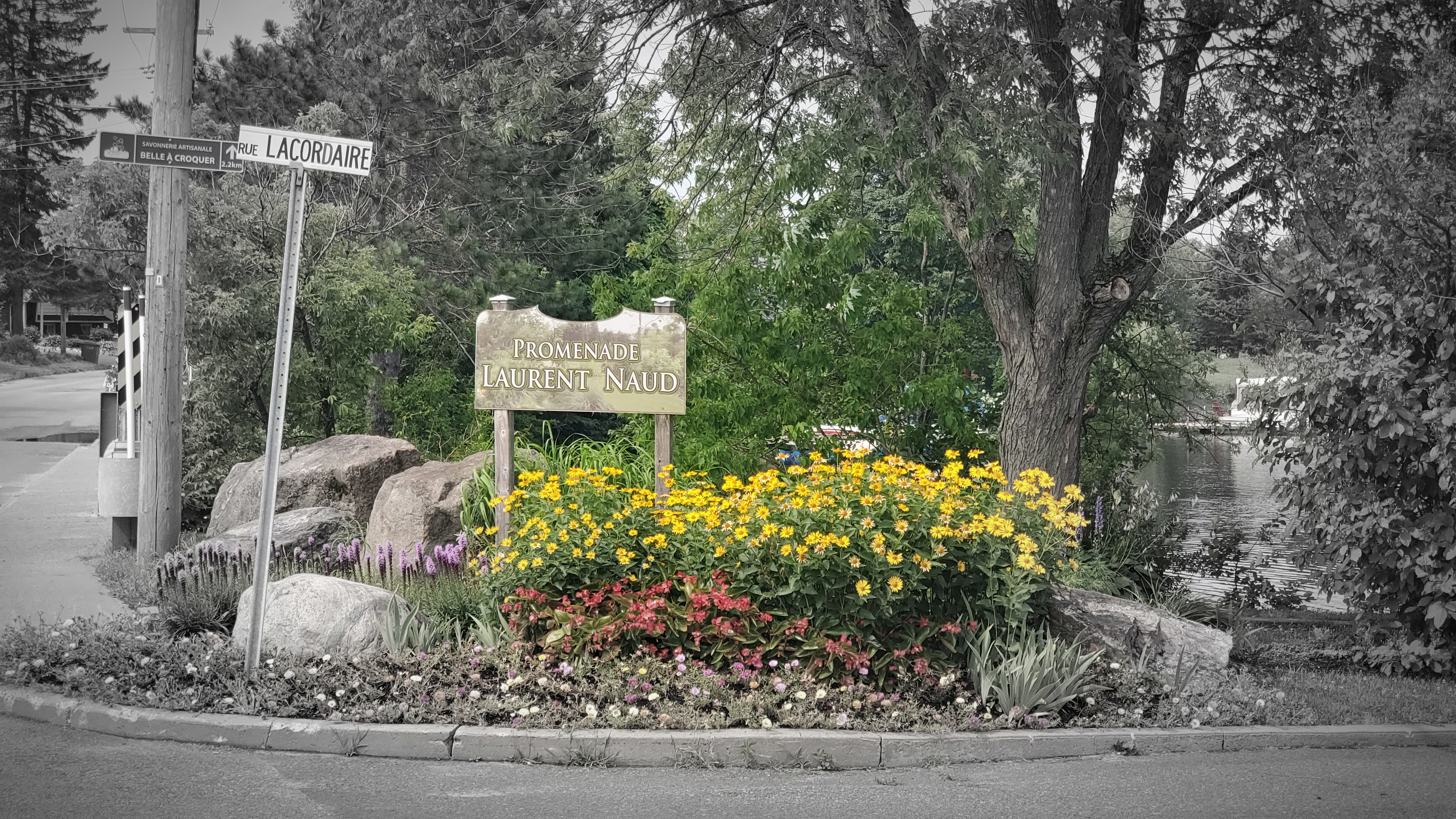
View of the start of the Promenade Laurent Naud (near the rue Du Pont bridge), along rue Lacordaire and Lac Croche

He was an honorary member of the Commission of the centenary of Sainte-Thècle whose festivities took place in 1973–1974. He was also a founding member of the Knights of Columbus Council 2817 of Sainte-Thècle, founded in 1940. The municipality of Sainte-Thècle has attributed to Laurent Naud the status of "great builder" for his social and business involvement. The municipality has given him a toponymic designation "promenade Laurent Naud" which starts from Lacordaire Street and goes along Lac Croche.

Following the death of his father, Laurent Naud (son of Pierre Naud and Émérentienne Perron) then took over the company which will retain the name of Pierre Naud Enr. The company then expanded regionally by serving the Shawinigan and La Tuque markets. In addition, the company is engaged in the construction of houses, schools, logging camps and general renovation. Pierre Naud Enr was the general contractor having built in 1954 Masson College in Sainte-Thècle.

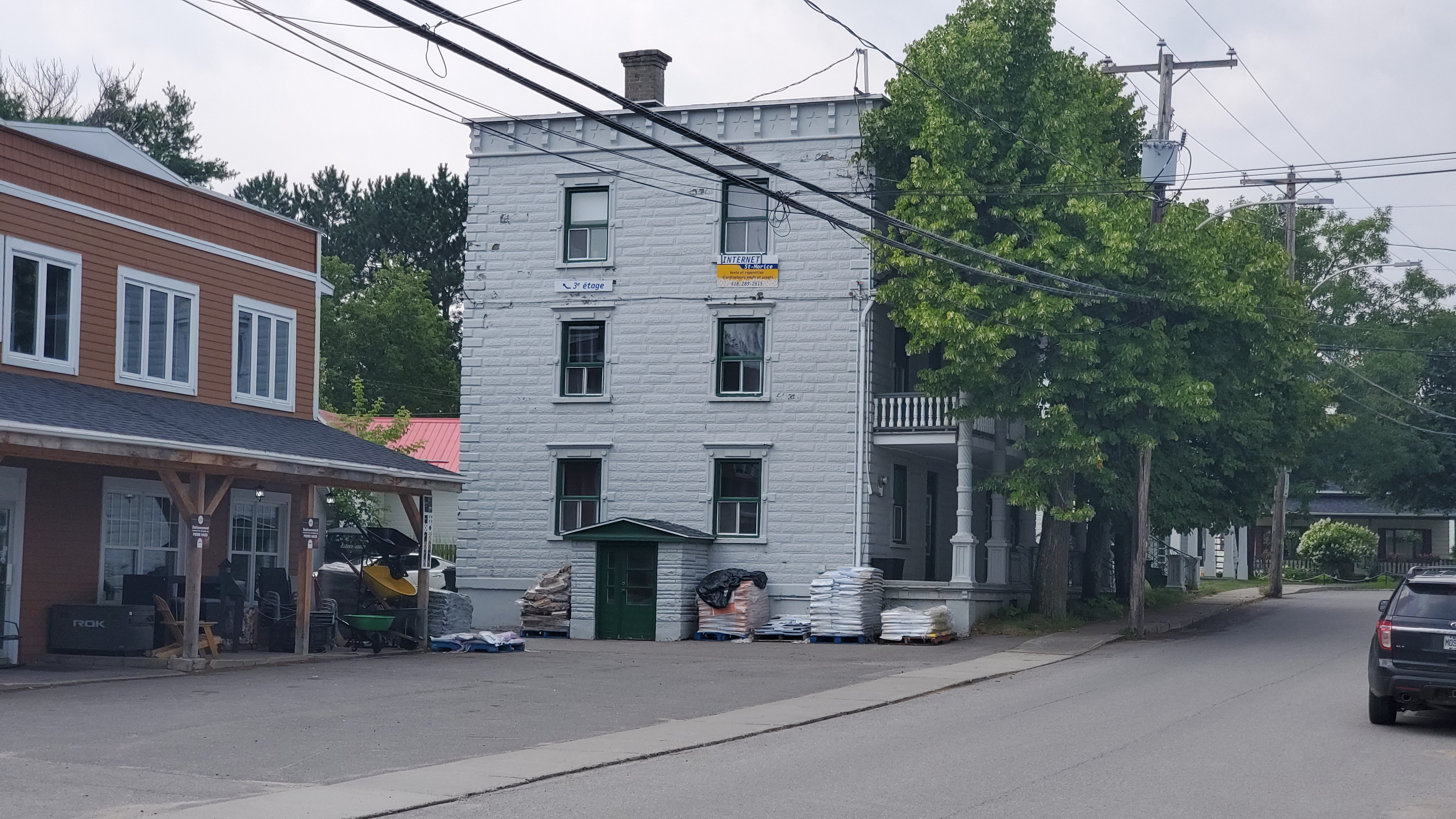
Store (on the left) and former Pierre's house, then Laurent Naud, rue Masson, in Sainte-Thècle, in 2021

In 1950, the company started a mill for sawing, sawing and planing wood, a kiln and warehouses. In the 1970s, the company built two new warehouses of materials. The company employed between 40 and 50 full-time employees, including machine tool people, carpenters, delivery men and clerks. The company had a large lumber yard (between the Lac des Chicots and the Masson street), various warehouses to store the cladding materials, a wood workshop where the famous openings were made "Piernaud" and a shop in the service of the builder.

In 1973, 25 motorized units were required to operate all the machines of the manufacture. The company was then using six trucks for the delivery and handling of the wood. The workshop and the trade then required a million and a half linear feet of wood per year. Major industrial customers included Consolidated Bathurst and C.I.P.

The company "Pierre Naud inc" obtained its letters patent on November 25, 1964 and establishes its head office at 281 rue Masson, Sainte-Thècle. This corporation was founded by Laurent Naud, industrialist, his wife Madeleine Lafrance, housewife and Pierre Naud, student. Two brothers of Laurent, Minville and Célien, worked in this company.
