= Josaphat Groleau =

Canadian businessman and mayor

Josaphat Groleau (September 11, 1893, in Saint-Tite, Quebec, Canada – January 11, 1993, in Sainte-Thècle) was a Quebec businessman (Canada), a mayor, county prefect and president of the School Board of the village of Sainte-Thècle. His first marriage was celebrated on April 16, 1918 in the church of Sainte-Thècle to Rose-Blanche Gervais. This couple has fifteen children baptized in Sainte-Thècle. The family lived in the house of 270 rue Saint-Jacques, in the village of Sainte-Thècle. This house has become a retirement residence "Résidence Josaphat Groleau enr." and the "Auberge Josaphat Groleau enr.".

== Biographical Summary ==
Josaphat Groleau was educated at the college of Saint-Tite. Following the course of his father, in the 20s, Josaphat Groleau runs a sawmill in Hervey-Jonction.

In 1920, Josaphat Groleau is appointed city councilor to the municipality of the village of Sainte-Thècle. Then, he served as mayor in three periods: from 1927 to 1931; from 1947 to 1955; then from 1960 to 1965. He served as commissioner from 1935 to 1945 to the school board of the village, and president from 14 April 1947 to 13 June 1949. He ended his public career in the function of county prefect to the "Corporation municipale des comtés de Champlain-Laviolette" (Municipal Corporation of Champlain-Laviolette Counties) where he was appointed on June 12, 1963.

Among his public duties, Josaphat Groleau was in 1944, with Jeffrey Veillette, director of the board of the Quebec Forestry Association Inc. (Saint-Maurice Regional Circle). He was also appointed Governor of Laval University in Quebec City. He was also a founding member of the Knights of Columbus Council 2817 of Sainte-Thècle, founded in 1940. On March 5, 1960, a special holiday was held in tribute to Josaphat Groleau on March 5, 1960 with a buffet at the Hotel Laviolette; he was then governor of the Sainte-Thècle Youth Chamber of Commerce.

He was an honorary member of the Centennial Commission of Sainte-Thècle whose festivities took place in 1973–1974. He was also president of the "Jeune Chambre de Sainte-Thècle".

Following his death, the City Council of Sainte-Thècle paid tribute to him on the obituary page of Le Nouvelliste for his social and economic involvement throughout his life. On August 17, 2008, the municipality designated the municipal barracks (rue St-Gabriel) "Josaphat Groleau building" in his honor. He was also named "Great builder" by the municipality.

== History of the family business ==
Théodore Groleau et Fils

Farmer in Saint-Tite, Theodore Groleau (married to Amanda Carpentier) arrived in 1897 at Sainte-Thècle with his family to be closer to his forest yard business; he executed timber cutting contracts until 1913. Together with his sons Josaphat and Arthur, he formed the Théodore Groleau et fils. He established at Sainte-Thecle a wood-cutting industry; he hired hundreds of workers throughout the year. Since 1903, four generations have worked in the exploitation of the Théodore Groleau family. These companies have always been involved in cutting, sawing and trading in wood.

From 1913 to 1918, the company obtained contracts with the Belgo (Consolidated Paper Corporation) of Shawinigan. In 1919, the company executed a major contract in Ontario for cutting logs and producing sleepers for railway construction. Then Théodore Groleau et Fils worked under contract for 11 years (from 1920 to 1931) with the Canadian International Paper (CIP),

After an active life in business, Theodore retired in 1931; until then, business activities were done under the name Théodore Groleau et Fils.

Groleau et Frères Ltée

Two of their sons, Josaphat and Arthur Groleau, take over and form the Groleau et Frères Society en 1933. The first mission of this new company was the cutting of pulpwood to feed the mills of the Mauricie. In 1938, they began cutting hardwood and built a sawmill at "lac du Missionnaire" in Lac-aux-Sables. The company then employed 60 men in winter on construction sites and more than 25 in summer at the sawmill.

Groleau Inc

On May 12, 1948, Groleau inc. was created by Josaphat, Arthur (timber contractor) and Paul Groleau (accountant) In 1948, Groleau inc began the operation of a hardwood floor (slatted floor line) factory which was completely destroyed by fire in March 1954, in front of Sainte-Thècle railway station. A corporate advertisement of July 18, 1948 in Le Nouvelliste indicates that Groleau inc produces 12,000 feet of hardwood flooring daily. The plant then has a kiln with a total capacity of 40,000 feet of hardwood.

In October 1955, production resumed. In July 1955, the sawmill on Mission Lake was burned down and rebuilt next to the factory in the village of Sainte-Thècle. In the meantime, Groleau & Frères Ltd. obtained its letters patent on July 27, 1951.

In March 1964, Paul Groleau succeeded his father in the management of the company. The company then adds a line of mosaic parquet while maintaining the slatted floor line. In November 1965, Cie Groleau Inc became the fifth largest manufacturer of parquet flooring in Quebec. Destroyed by a fire in 1973, the village sawmill was rebuilt and production returned to normal in October 1973.

Expansion outside of Moyenne-Mauricie

From 1977, production was transferred outside the region while purchasing: building in Compton (Eastern Townships) used to manufacture mosaic parquet, a building in Louiseville (1983) to install a mosaic parquet production line and a factory varnished slab floor line and an industrial complex at Saint-Mathieu-de-Beloeil (1992) serving as a distribution center. The company also produces factory-painted flooring and dries a large quantity of wood. In 2002, mosaic parquet fabrication was moved from Compton to Louiseville.

The company ceased operations in Sainte-Thècle in 2005. The building of the Sainte-Thècle village factory was bought in 1910 by a new company "Entreprises Sainte-Thècle inc" to exploit it for the production of bagged firewood, kindling wood and firewood on pallets. With regret, a fire destroyed on July 25, 2012 entirely this industrial building.
