= Lordship of Sainte-Anne-de-la-Pérade =

Coordinates: 46.6833°N 72.4167°W

The Lordship of Sainte-Anne-de-la-Pérade was located on the north shore of St. Lawrence River, between Trois-Rivières and Quebec City in the province of Quebec, Canada. The southern front of the manor was on the edge of St. Lawrence River. The depth of the lordship was heading north, parallel to the Lordship of Batiscan (on West side). The northern boundary of the Lordship of Sainte-Anne-de-la-Perade stopped at the north-western boundary of St. Joseph row, in Sainte-Thècle. In comparison, the lordship of Batiscan spanned 20 "lieues", beyond the Saint-Maurice River. The western boundary of the manor cut the Batiscan River at the rapids of Manitou, between Saint-Adelphe and Saint-Stanislas. The estates of the north shore of St. Lawrence River fell within the stately administrative division of Trois-Rivières.

The Lordship of Sainte-Anne-de-la-Pérade was divided into two areas:

1. Western half of the lordship was located between the Lordship of Sainte-Marie, the Lordship of Batiscan (west) and the eastern half of the Lordship of Saint-Anne-de-la-Pérade;

2. Eastern half of the lordship skirted the Western half.

Both territories were included mainly in the municipality of Sainte-Anne-de-la-Pérade, in the MRC Les Chenaux Regional County Municipality, in the administrative region of Mauricie.

Established in 1627 in New France and abolished in 1854, the feudal system allowed the state to divide the territory into fiefs and lordships to sustain the momentum of colonization. This stately institution allowed the distribution and land use by controlling the development. In each fiefs or manors, lords attributed by lots to the highest bidder settlers (charging system). These could lease them back to other settlers. The person was granted by the State territory became lord. The concession contract required him to be operating his lordship.

The seigneurial system is based on the feudal system that subjected the census (referred to as "habitant" in New France) to the Lord. Based on the principle of entrepreneurship, the seigneurial system stimulated colonization efforts.

== Toponymy ==
The name "Lordship of Sainte-Anne-de-la-Pérade" takes its name from the Sainte-Anne river which flows into the St. Lawrence River (North shore) at the height of Sainte-Anne-de-la-Pérade, located about fifty kilometres (31 mi) east of Trois-Rivières. From its source at Lake Anne (in the Laurentides Wildlife Reserve), the Sainte-Anne River follows a path of about 120 kilometres (75 mi). The river crosses the municipalities of Saint-Alban, Quebec of Saint-Casimir and Sainte-Anne-de-la-Pérade.

In 1609, the river was named "Sante-Marie" by Samuel de Champlain, who used the same name in his book from 1632, titled "Les Voyages de la Nouvelle-France occidentale dite Canada" (The Travels of the western New France called Canada). However, the map drawn about 1641 by Jean Bourdon—which describes the course of St. Lawrence River, between Tadoussac and Montreal—refers to the river as "R St Anne", without any explanation for this original Christian toponym. Finally, the last name is required. In popular usage, the river is called "Sainte-Anne-de-la-Pérade" because its mouth is located in the municipality of the same name.

The name "Lordship of Sainte-Anne-de-la-Pérade" was formally recorded on February 3, 1983, in the register of place names at the Commission de toponymie du Québec (Geographical Names Board of Québec).

== History ==
=== Colonization Movement ===
The colonization of the lordship of Sainte-Anne-de-la-Pérade began with a leading front on the north side of St. Lawrence River. Initially, the second row was not implemented because of the swampy (including peat) land. In a second stage of colonization, the settlers chose to settle along the Sainte-Anne River. Then, the expansion to the second row away from streams, rather orientation towards Charest River and its main branch the stream Gendron. This rises to the top the moraine in the territory of Saint-Stanislas (east side of the Batiscan River), descends into the moraine and through the village of Saint-Prosper before emptying into the Charest River, almost at its mouth. Charest river latter flows into the Sainte-Anne River.

The most favorable overland road to move from St. Lawrence River sector to the Rivière des Envies sector is to cross the moraine (about a kilometer) west of the village of Saint-Prosper, on the course of the present route 159. The road of row Saint-Auguste at the foot of the moraine and parallel to it connects the village of Saint-Prosper and Sainte-Geneviève-de-Batiscan (through the Rivière à Veillet road).

=== Timeline ===
1. 1667, the first installations of the pioneers in the territory of the Lordship. Note: in the Lordship of Champlain, colonization began in 1664 and in the Lordship of Sainte-Marie in July 1669.
2. In 1670, Sieur Amelin (Hamelin) gets the concession rights in this sector.
3. October 29, 1672, steward Jean Talon of the New France grants manorial rights to Edmond de Suève and Thomas Tarieu Lanaudière, in the Sainte-Anne River area. The extent of the manor is 1.5 "lieues" of frontage on one "lieue" deep. Under the concession, the lord of Lanaudière have bought the land from Mr. Amelin (Hamelin) in 1672.
4. 4 March 1697, the government of Trois-Rivières authorizes an expansion of 3 "lieues" deep, which is granted by the Governor Frontenac and Intendant Champigny Marguerite Denis, widow of Thomas Tarieu Lanaudière.
5. On 6 April 1697, the government of Trois-Rivières grants the islands on the St. Lawrence River, located in front of the manor. This new concession will be officially certified on October 30, 1700.
6. The order of January 8, 1710, granted Pierre-Thomas Joliette Tarieu the enjoyment of the islands located in front of the lordship, while coseigneur François Chorel of Saint-Romain, said Orvilliers, sees dismiss. An increase to 30 October 1700, is the lordship Tarieu.
7. November 10, 1772 - Charles-François Tarieu Lanaudière transfers the rights to the lordship to his son Charles-Louis de Lanaudière.
8. Feb 13. 1781 - Charles-Louis de Lanaudière fully owns the rights to the Lordship.
9. November 11, 1811 - With only daughter, Marie-Anne Tarieu Lanaudière acquired by succession manorial rights of his father Charles-Louis de Lanaudière.
10. September 27, 1819 - Marie-Anne Tarieu Lanaudière sells its rights to the lordship of Sainte-Anne-de-la-Perade to John Hale.
11. December 24, 1838 - Following the death of John Hale, the Lordship of Sainte-Anne-de-la-Pérade is now co-owned by his children: George Carleton, Edward Jeffery, Bernard, Richard, William Amherst, Francis, Isabella, Mary and Henry.
12. December 18, 1854 - Abolition of the feudal regime in Lower Canada.

Decimal coordinates of the Lordship: -72.41666, 46.68333

The Catholic parish of Sainte-Anne-de-la-Pérade was canonically established in 1714. The erection of the civil parish municipality in 1845. In 1912, the municipality of the village of La Pérade is made. Finally, it merges in 1989 with the municipality of the parish Sainte-Anne-de-la-Pérade.

Domaine Sainte-Anne stately, located at 910, Sainte-Anne, Sainte-Anne-de-la-Pérade (QC), G0X 2J0, offers various public cultural activities (e.g. exhibitions ...).

== See also ==
- Government of Trois-Rivières
- Lordship of Batiscan
- Sainte-Anne River
- Charest River
- Pierre-Paul River
- Tawachiche River
- Sainte-Anne-de-la-Pérade
- Saint-Prosper-de-Champlain
- Saint-Stanislas
- Saint-Adelphe
- Sainte-Thècle
- Les Chenaux Regional County Municipality
- Mekinac Regional County Municipality
