= Rivière-à-la-Lime =

Rivière à la lime
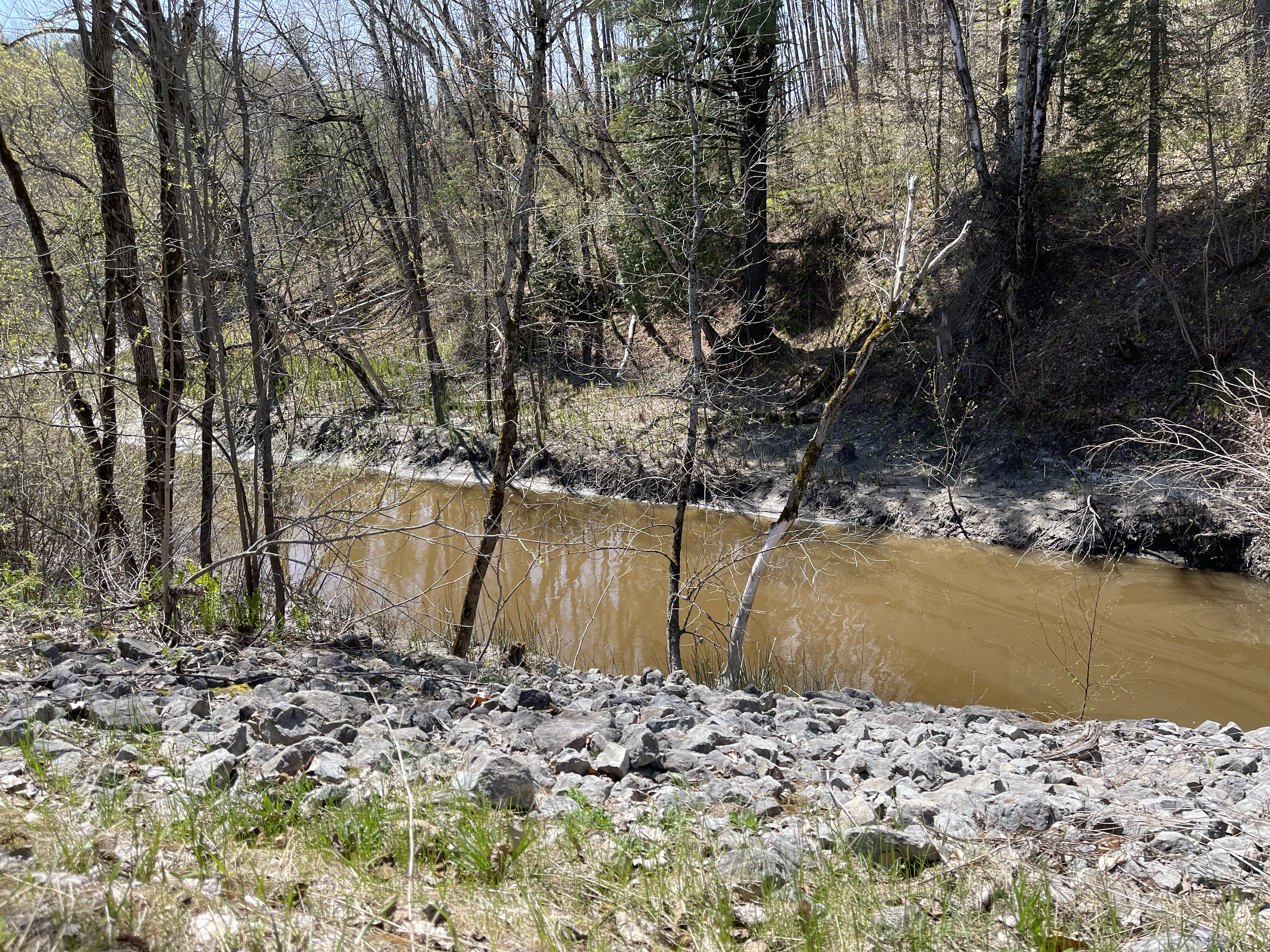
- Rang de la Rivière-à-la-Lime, Ste-Geneviève-de-Batiscan

- Rivière-à-la-Lime (Quebec) Sainte-Geneviève-de-Batiscan, Batiscanie, Quebec

Physical characteristics
- Source
  - location: Saint-Narcisse, Quebec
  - coordinates: 46.53528°N 72.37472°W
  - elevation: 109 m (358 ft)
- Mouth
  - location: Batiscan River, Sainte-Geneviève-de-Batiscan
  - elevation: 10 m (33 ft)
- Length: 12.14 km (7.54 mi)
- Basin size: 25.86 km^{2} (9.98 sq mi)

Basin features
- Tributaries
  - right: Bradley brook

The Rivière à la lime flows in the municipality of Sainte-Geneviève-de-Batiscan, in the Les Chenaux Regional County Municipality, in the administrative region of Mauricie, in the province of Quebec, Canada. The "rivière à la lime" drains a watershed of 25.86 km^{2}. This river has a length of 12.14 km and empties into the Batiscan River.

== Geography ==
Taking it source in the Saint-Narcisse's moraine, this river of the Batiscanie flows eastward in agricultural areas (sometimes through small forest areas) in the plain at the foot of the large moraine (mountainous online extending parallel to St. Lawrence River in the east-west direction).

This river receives waters from Bradley Creek (at 3.6 km from its mouth) which comes from Saint-Luc-de-Vincennes. In its course, the river flows through the Route 361 of the "rang Rivière à la lime" (row). The "rivière à la lime" empties into the Batiscan River, towards la "Grande pointe" (great point of land), above the village of Sainte-Geneviève-de-Batiscan. The mouth of the "rivière à la lime" is located at 6.2 km downstream from the mouth of the Rivière des Chutes and 9.2 km lower of the mouth of the Rivière des Envies. The newspaper of Trois-Rivières says on March 15, 1875, that near the "rivière à la lime", we find significant deposits of bog iron ore.

The drained basin of the "rivière à la lime" was the third area of colonization in the Lordship of Batiscan up to the 18th century, after the colonization of the surroundings of St. Lawrence River and Batiscan River. Agriculture is the main activity in the watershed. The residences of the basin are primarily located in the Third row (3e rang), Great Line (Grande Ligne) and the row of the "Rivière-à-la-Lime".

== Toponymy ==
Three theories explain the origin of the name "Rivière à la lime":

- Analogy between the sinuosity of the river and the teeth of a saw or file;
- Silty character of the river (sometimes muddy peat, clay or alluvial).
- The term "lime" is translating into French as "chaux", which is an alkaline or highly basic solids, powder and easily hydrophilic, white or whitish color. Lime is obtained by calcination of limestone, formerly manufactured by craftsmen in a lime kiln and industrially in various modern ovens. Lime is used since ancient times, especially in construction and for the foundation and foundations ways and buildings. Lime has been extensively used to whiten the outside and inside of farm buildings. The English word "limestone" means "calcaire" in French.

The French name "Rivière à la lime" was formalized as of December 5, 1968, in the register of place names of the Commission de toponymie du Québec (Geographical Board of names places of Québec). Meanwhile, the "rang Rivière-à-la-Lime" (row) was formalized with the commission as of April 9, 1979. The name of the place derives from the river of the same name.

== History ==
- J.B. Baril built in the early 19th century a saw mill on the "Rivière à la lime" on lot 582, custom Joseph Drapeau. Then J.B. Baril might have operated it. In 1873, Antoine Désaulniers becomes the owner of the mill and sold it in 1884, while the activities of the mill had ceased. The shoemaker, storyteller and singer Theophile Bronsard stayed there in the last decade of the 19th century.
- Located on the "rivière à la lime", the forges of St. Genevieve were in operation from 1794 to 1813.
- The pioneers of the current territory of Saint-Narcisse from Sainte-Geneviève-de-Batiscan followed the path of the "Rivière à la Lime" and forest paths to reach their respective lot located northwest up the moraine. From there, they could reach on foot through the forest trails in the designated area "Rivière des Envies", today Saint-Stanislas territory. Walking upward on the western shore, the pioneers bypassed the natural obstacles of the "Great falls" of the Batiscan River (falls between Jimmy and chimney).

== Photos ==
Rivière-à-la-Lime, Sainte-Geneviève-de-Batiscan

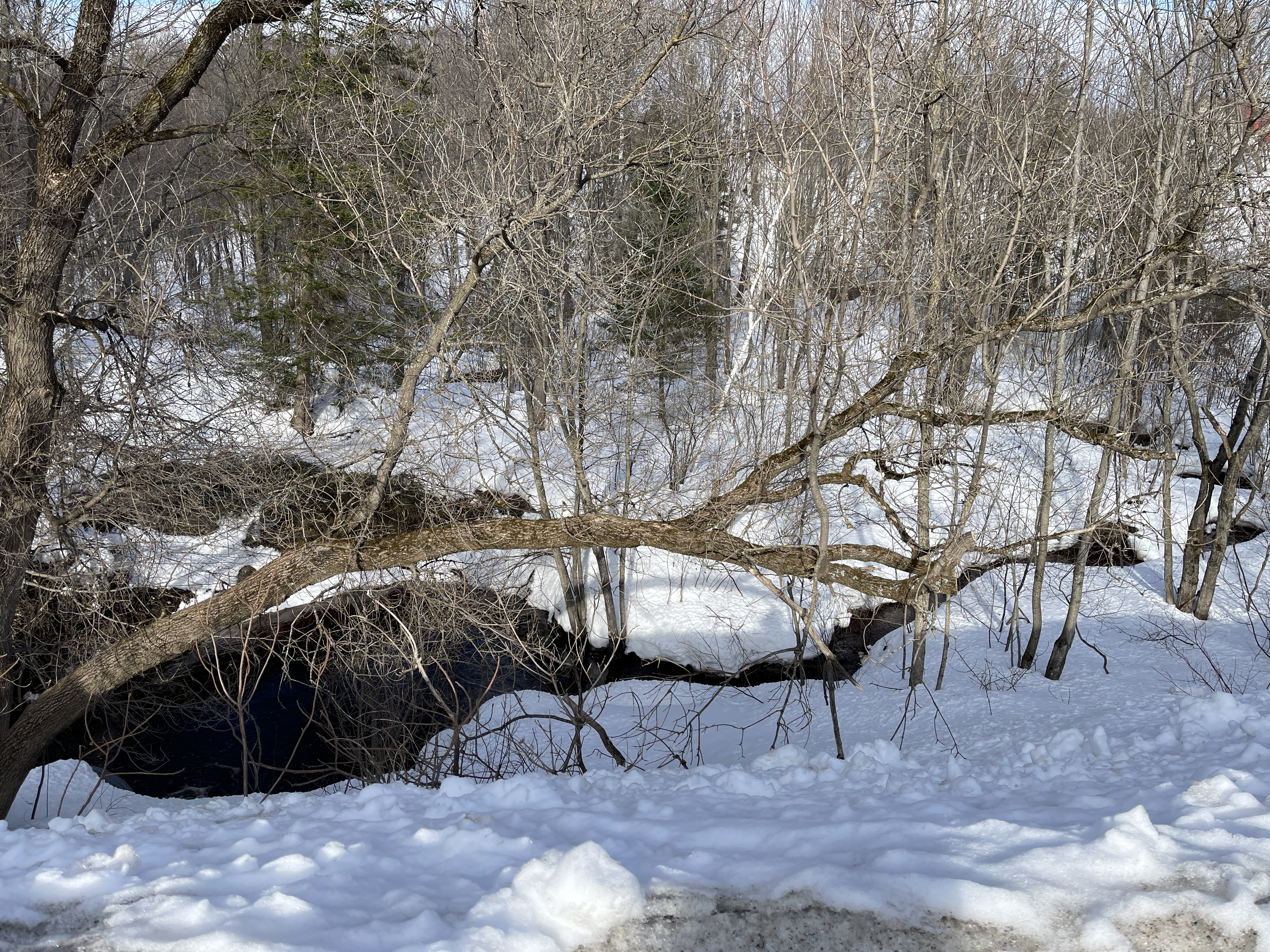
Rang de la Rivière-à-la-Lime (Road 361)

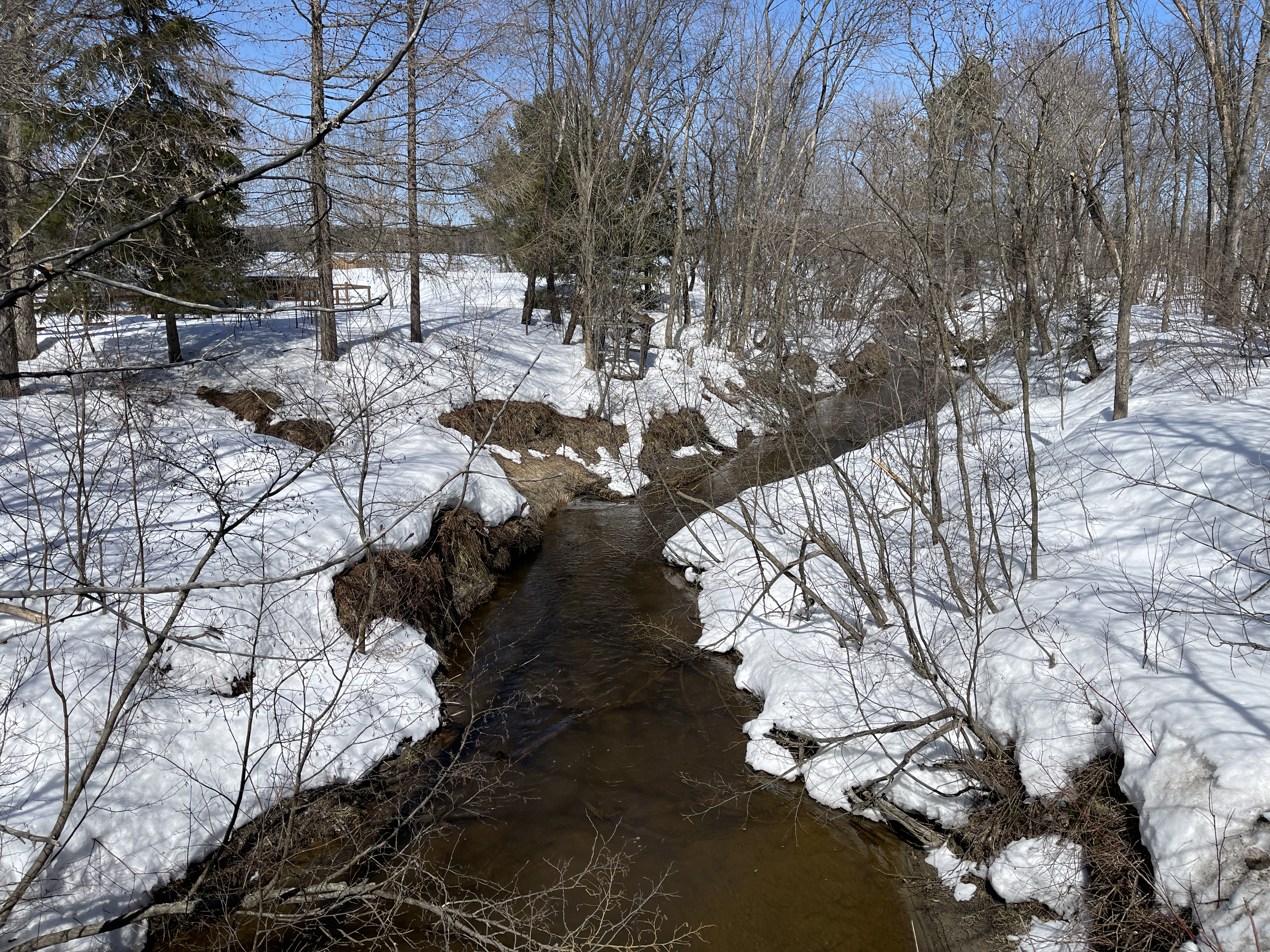
From bridge P-08968, rang de la Rivière-à-la-Lime (Road 361)

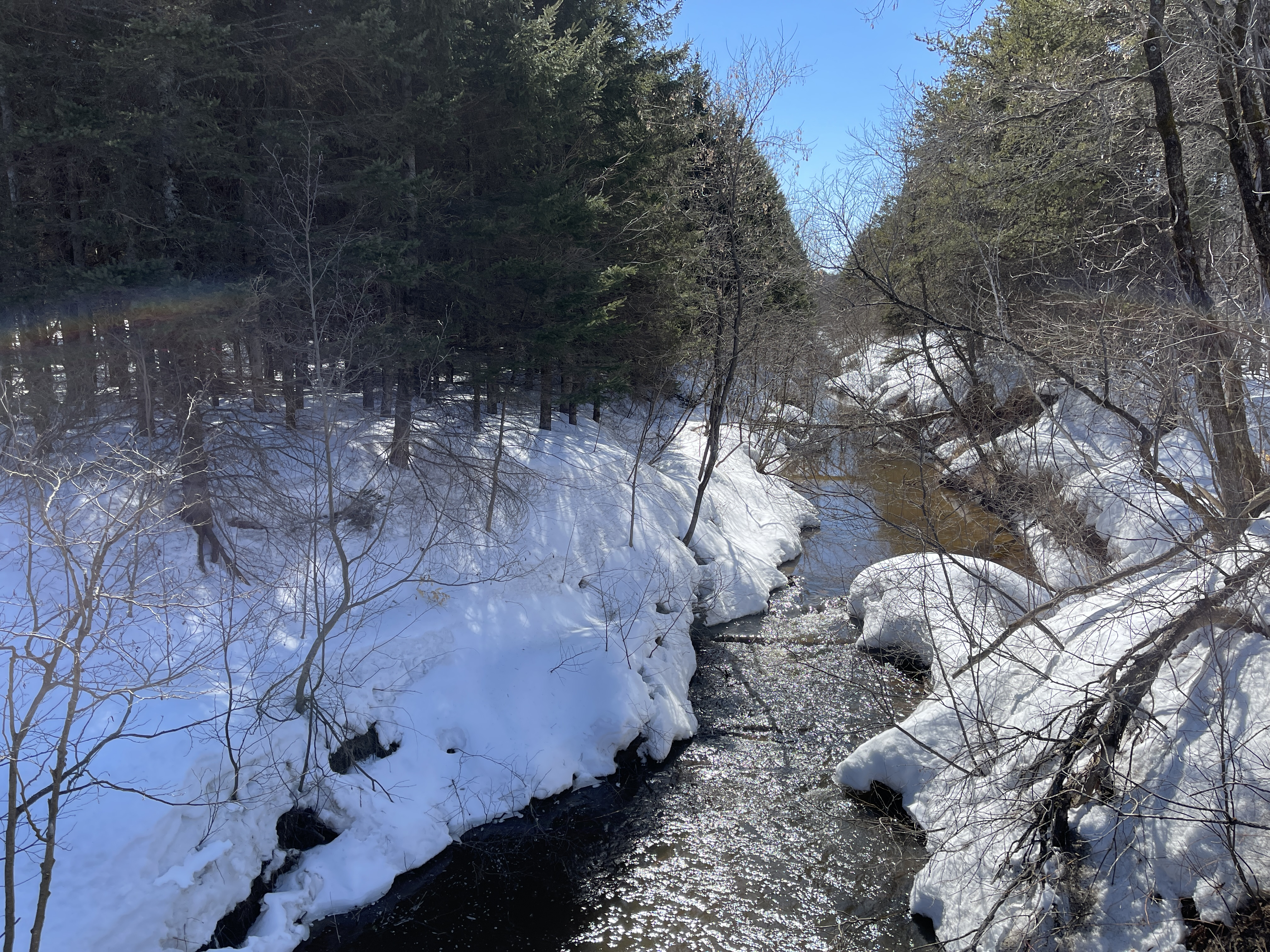
From bridge P-08968, rang de la Rivière-à-la-Lime (Road 361)

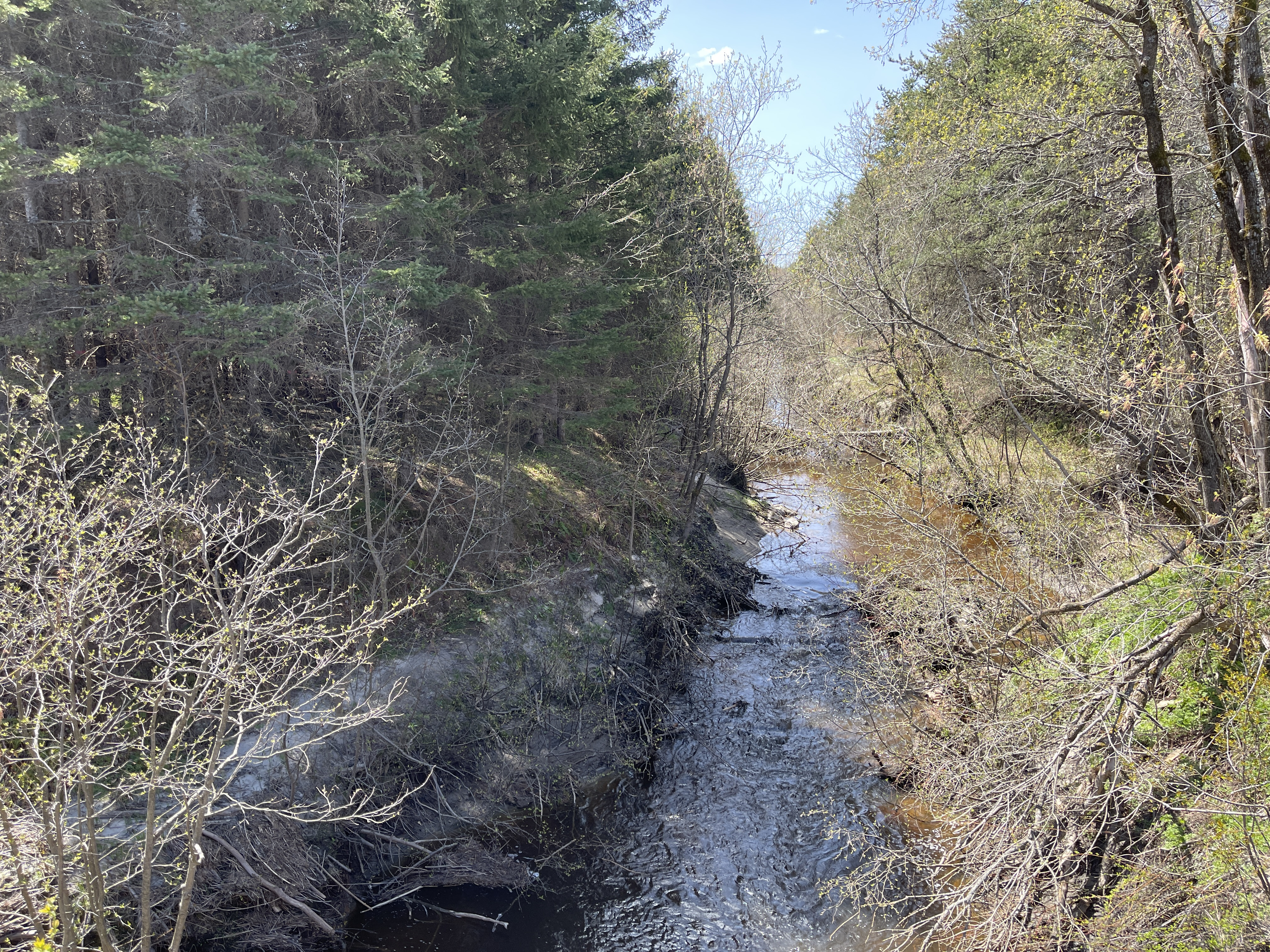
From bridge P-08968, rang de la Rivière-à-la-Lime (Road 361)

== See also ==
- List of rivers of Quebec
