= Veillet River =

Rivière-a-Veillet, strean
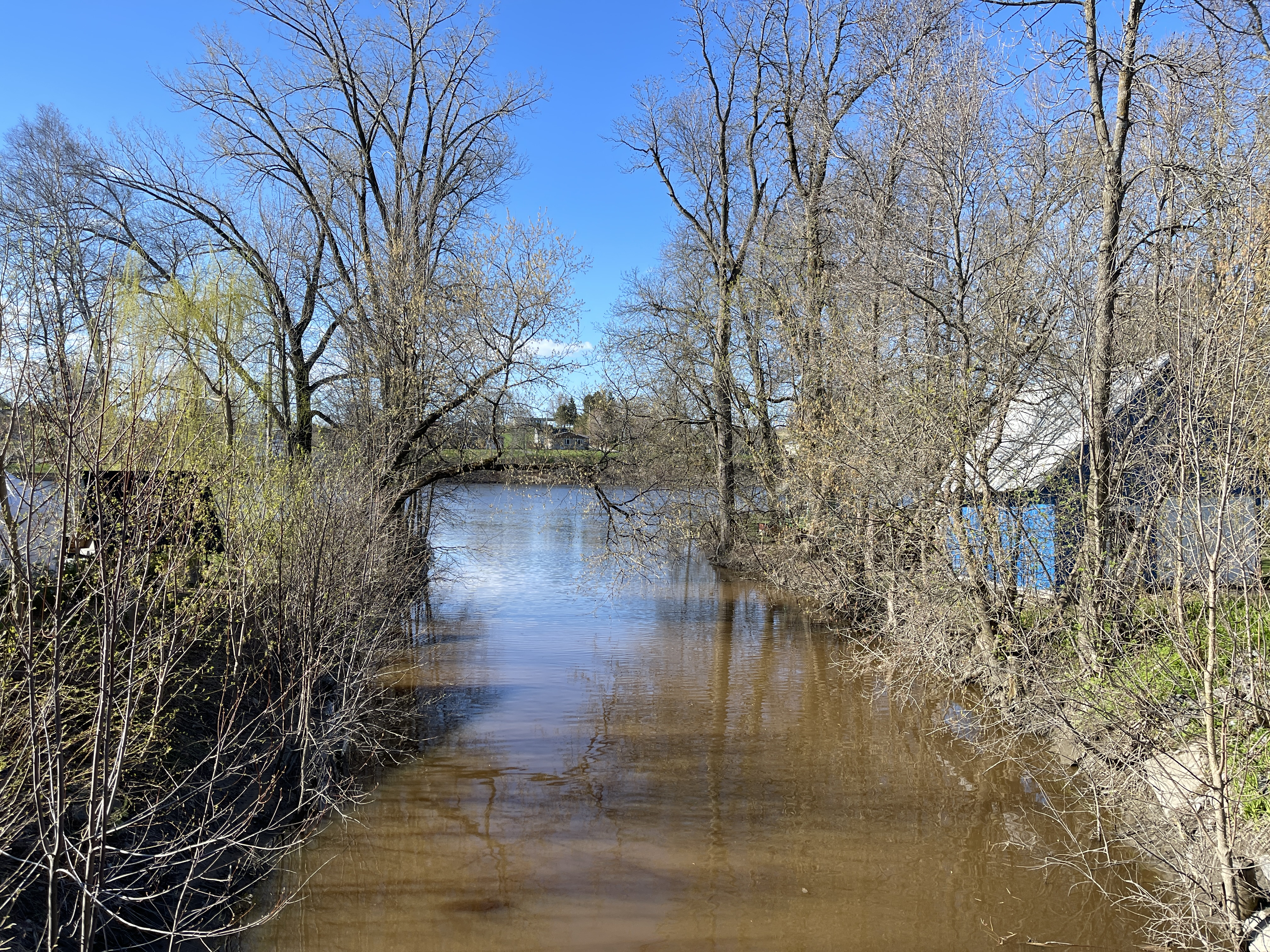
- Rivière à Veillet flows into the Batiscan River, Sainte-Geneviève-de-Batiscan

- Location within Quebec

Location
- Country: Canada
- Province: Quebec
- Region: Mauricie

Physical characteristics
- Source
  - location: At the foot of the moraine, Sainte-Geneviève-de-Batiscan
  - coordinates: 46°36′13″N 72°20′44″W
  - elevation: 90 m (300 ft)
- Mouth: Batiscan River
  - location: Sainte-Geneviève-de-Batiscan, Les Chenaux
  - coordinates: 46.528574°N 72.336694°W
  - elevation: 10 m (33 ft)
- Length: 11.3 km (7.0 mi)
- Basin size: 3,711 km^{2} (1,433 sq mi)Batiscanie
- Discharge
  - location: Sainte-Geneviève-de-BatiscanThe mouth of the river empties at the village

Basin features
- Tributaries
  - left: Saint-Arnaud brook, Gauthier brook

The Veillet River (French: Rivière-à- Veillet) is located in the municipality of Sainte-Geneviève-de-Batiscan, in the Regional County Municipality of "Les Chenaux", in the administrative region of Mauricie, in the province of Quebec, Canada.

== Geography ==
From its source in the moraine this river of the Batiscanie flows from north-east to south-west on 11.3 km, at the foot of the large moraine (mountain line extending parallel to St. Lawrence River in the South-West to Nord-East direction). This river flows into the Batiscan River at the heart of the village of Sainte-Geneviève-de-Batiscan and empties near the church.

The "Rivière à Veillet" valley covers 37,1 km². The upper valley of the river Veillet was the fourth area of colonization in Lordship of Batiscan (after the bank of St. Lawrence River, of Batiscan River then rivière-à-la-Lime) at the beginning of 18th Century. The great tragedies connected to the Veillet river were debacle of 1730 that claimed the wooden bridge just a few hundred feet from the mouth and landslide of May 1, 1877 that destroyed the sawmill of Francois-Xavier Massicotte and led five loss of life.

== Photos ==
Sainte-Geneviève-de-Batiscan

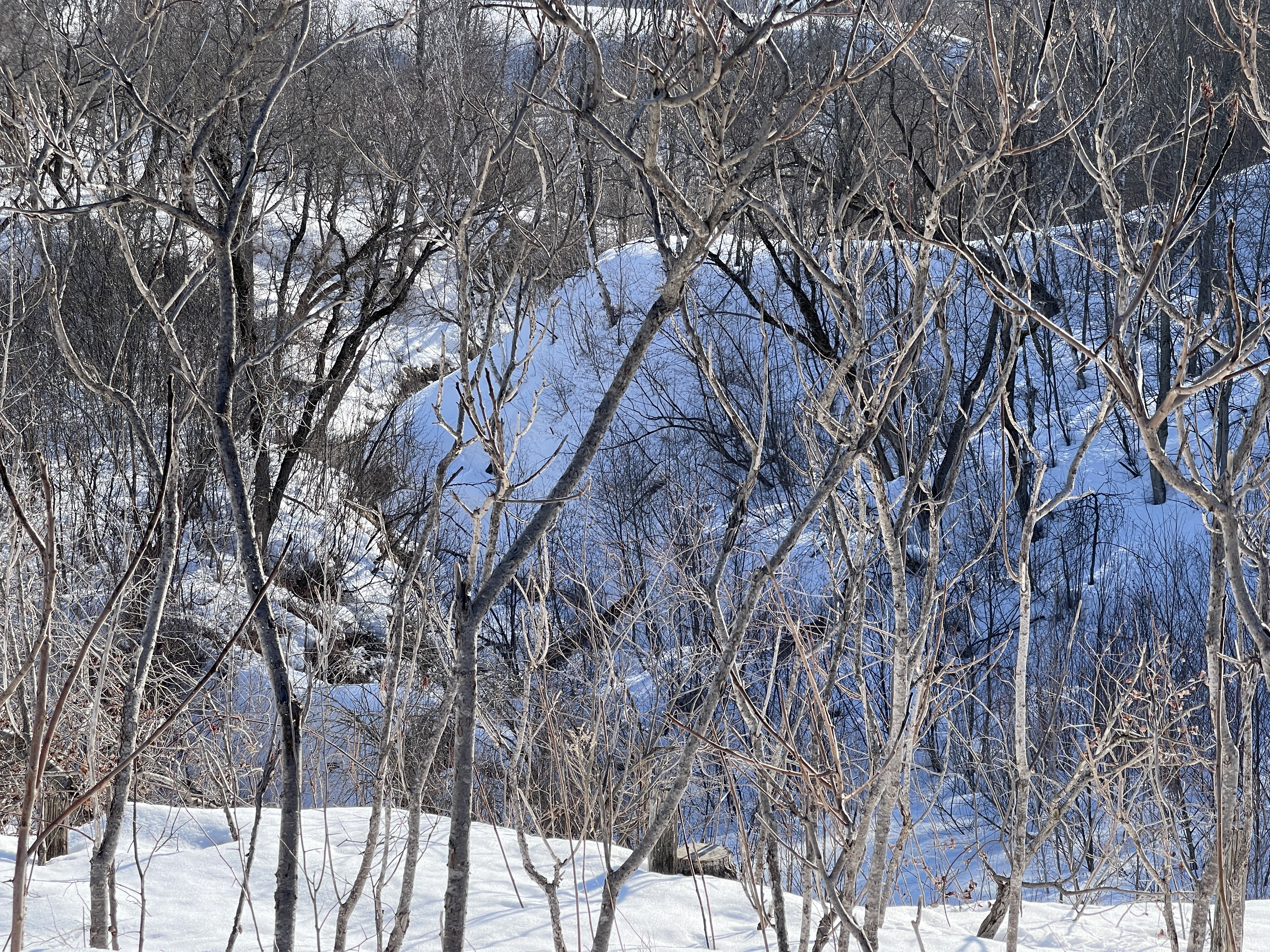
Rivière-a-Veillet, small unidentified tributary

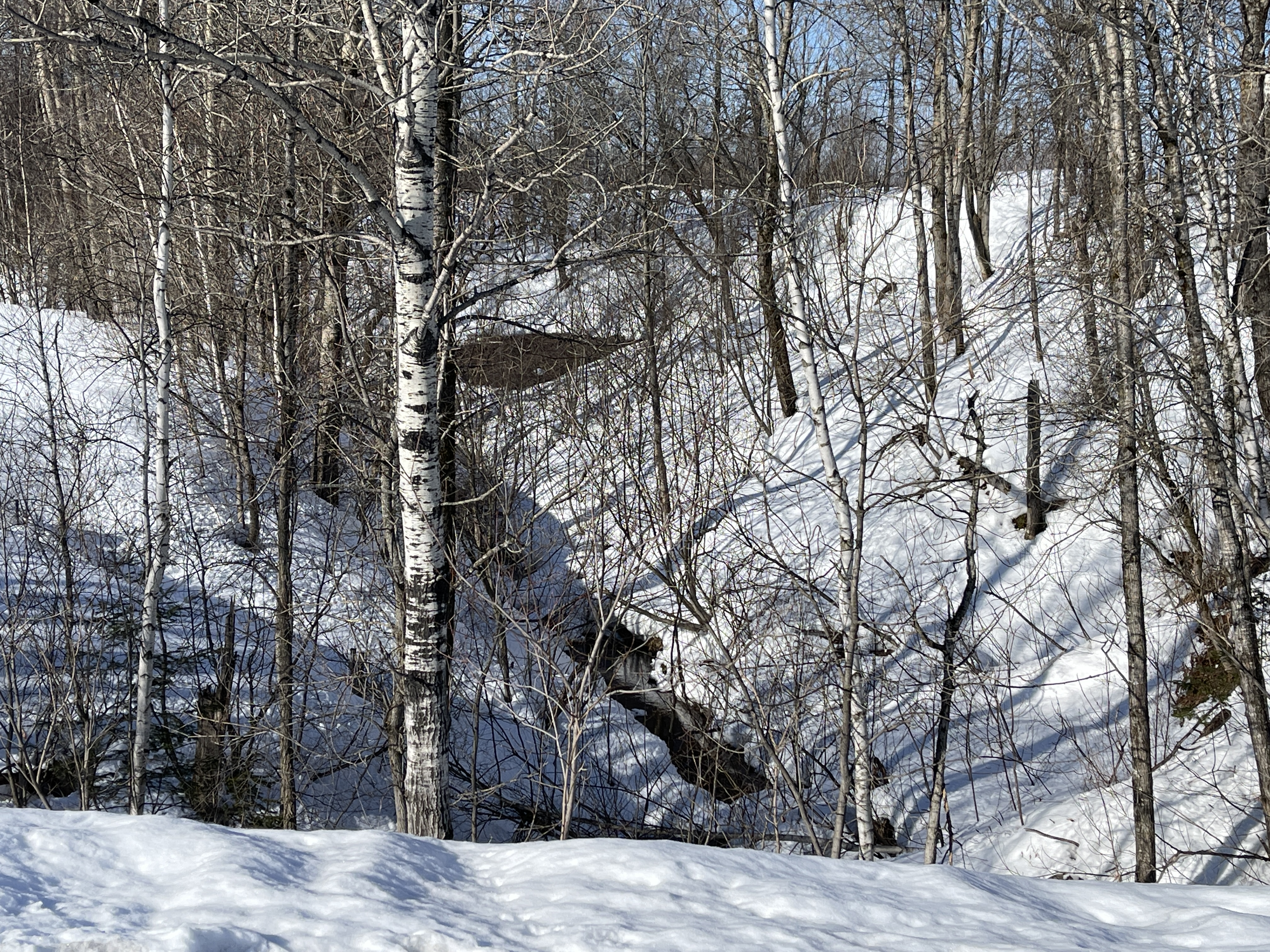
Rivière-a-Veillet, small unidentified tributary

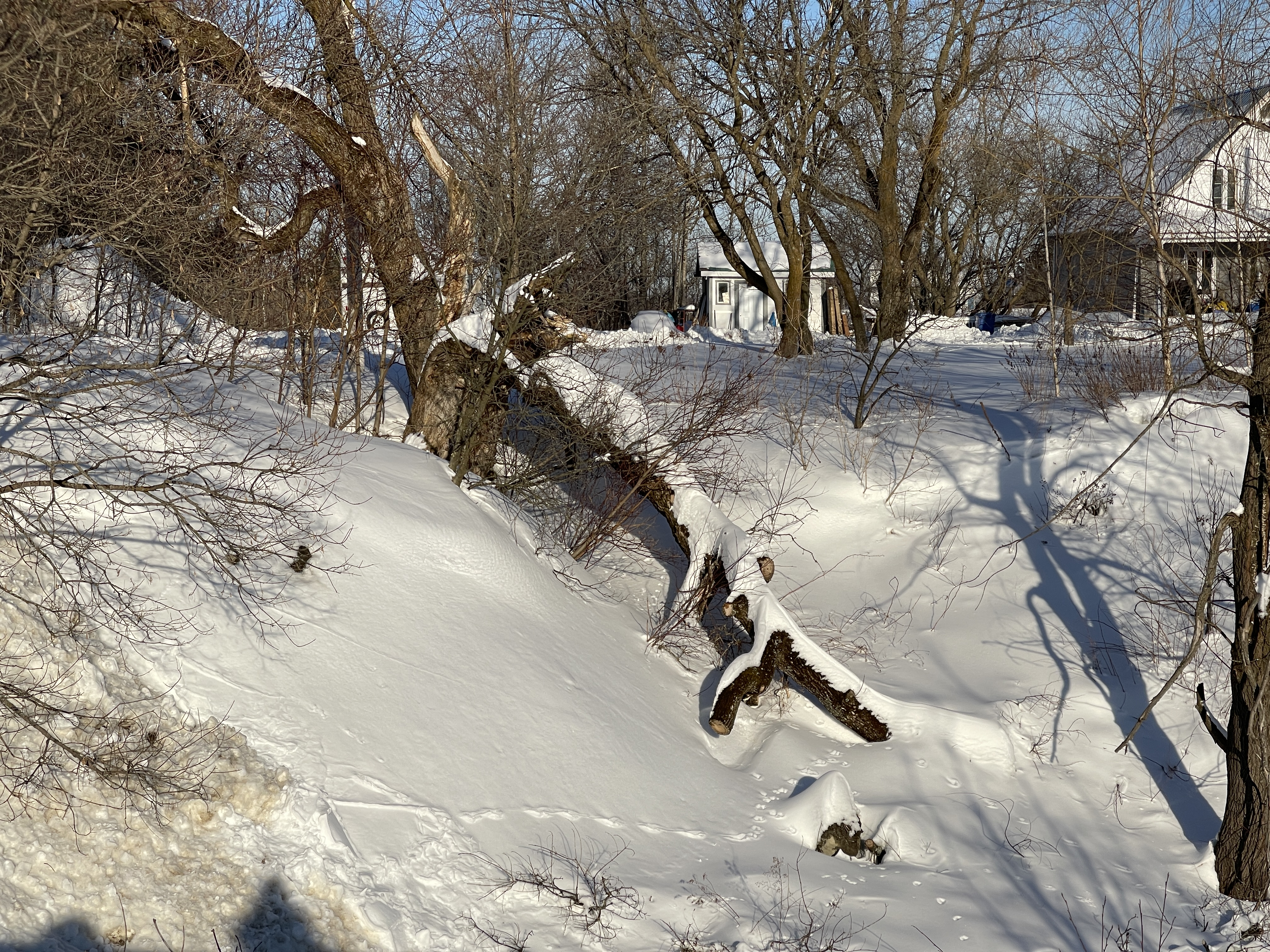
Rivière à Veillet

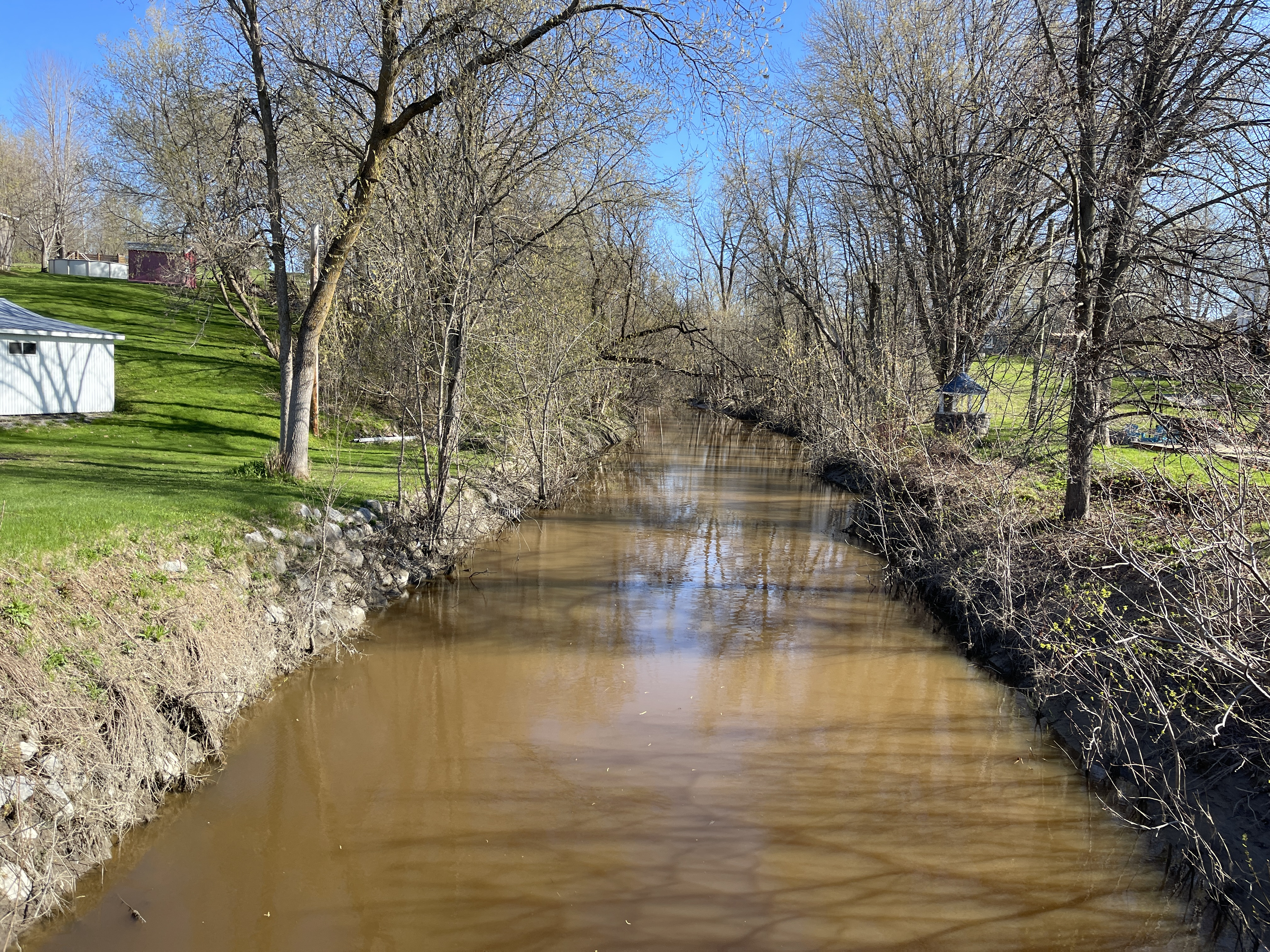
River at Veillet near its mouth, from bridge 16746

== Toponymy ==
The name "River Veillet" is derived from the military and census Jean Veillet, ancestor of all Veillet/te of America. Jean Veillet arrived in Canada in 1687 as a military troop "Compagnies Franches de la Marine" (Free Companies of Navy). After his military commitment in 1700 (and perhaps earlier), Jean Veillet held unofficially a location at the mouth of the Veillet River on East bank of Batiscan River in the actual the village of Sainte-Geneviève-de-Batiscan. Finally, the Jesuits lords of the Lordship of Batiscan agreed by the concession contract notarized in 1711, to cease officially this lot to Jean Veillet. That same year he also received a grant of right to cut and sell timber. Jean Veillet is one of the first forest entrepreneurs of the Lordship of Batiscan. The river flows lengthwise into the Veillet land of Jean Veillet.

The Church of Sainte-Geneviève-de-Batiscan was built on a plot of land belonging to the ancestor Jean Veillet.

Jean Veillet was born in 1664 in Saint-André de Niort, France. He married on November 19, 1698 in Batiscan Marguerite Lariou. His military career ended at his marriage period. Jean Veillet died as of February 21, 1741, in Sainte-Geneviève-de-Batiscan.

Following the death of pioneer Jean Veillet, his eldest son Jean Veillet (married in 1726 to Catherine Lefebvre) bought in 1743 from his brothers and sisters their share of the estate. Jean (son) and his wife had already acquired on January 2, 1742, from the Jesuits a concession at the Rivière des Envies (Cravings river). Subsequently, the ancestral lot was transferred to Michel Veillet (husband of Josephte Normandin), grandson of the ancestor Jean Veillet. In July 1790, Michel Veillet sold his property rights on the plot of land where the church was built, and setting a 67-year-old dispute.

The name "River Veillet" was formalized on August 14, 1997 in the register of place names of the Commission de toponymie du Québec (Geographical Names Board of Québec).

== Path of the "river à Veillet" ==
The "Chemin de la rivière Veillet" (Road of Veillet river) along the Veillet river is about 3.75 km. Its course began at the intersection of Church Street (rue de l'église) and "chemin des forges"; it ends at the intersection of "rang St-Augustin" (row St-Augustin) and "chemin du village Jacob" (Village Jacob Road). At this intersection, a white wooden cross was erected next to the public road. A small box attached to the cross housed a famous old ordeal that have been designed in 1827.

The people residing in the depth of "Chemin de la rivière Veillet" (road of Veillet river) in Sainte-Geneviève-de-Batiscan and Gendron Creek (a tributary of the Charest River) in Saint-Prosper lived close together. Despite being subject to two separate lordships, we identified several inter-lordships marriages.

== Tragedies of history ==
The history of Rivière-à-Veillet is marked by a series of catastrophes: major floods, floods, scree, breakage of dikes/dams, washout of bridges... The debacle of 1730 swept away the wooden bridge located at a height of hundred feet from the mouth of the mouth of the river at Veillet, or near the site of the first chapel. The bridge was rebuilt in June. The worst tragedy was that of May 1, 1877 when a scree killed five people and destroyed the flour mill.

== See also ==
- Lordship of Batiscan
- Sainte-Geneviève-de-Batiscan
- Batiscan River
- Batiscanie
- Saint-Prosper
- Charest River
- Saint-Stanislas
- Les Chenaux Regional County Municipality
- List of rivers of Quebec
