= Les Chenaux Regional County Municipality =

Les Chenaux
- Regional county municipality
- Coordinates: 46°30′N 72°25′W
- Country: Canada
- Province: Quebec
- Region: Mauricie
- Effective: January 1, 2002
- County seat: Saint-Luc-de-Vincennes

Government
  - Type: Prefecture
  - Prefect: Gérard Bruneau

Area
  - Total: 934.40 km^{2} (360.77 sq mi)
  - Land: 872.04 km^{2} (336.70 sq mi)

Population (2011)
  - Total: 17,865
  - Density: 20.5/km^{2} (53/sq mi)
  - Pop 2006-2011: ▲5.2%
  - Dwellings: 8,393
- Time zone: UTC−5 (EST)
  - Summer (DST): UTC−4 (EDT)
- Area codes: 819, 418 or 581
- Website: www.mrcdeschenaux.ca

Les Chenaux (French pronunciation: [le ʃəno], meaning the channels in French) is a regional county municipality in central Quebec, Canada, in the Mauricie region. The seat is in Saint-Luc-de-Vincennes. It is located adjacent on the east of Trois-Rivières on the Saint Lawrence River. It has a land area of 872.04 square kilometres (336.70 sq mi) and a population of 17,865 inhabitants in the Canada 2011 Census. Its largest community is the parish of Notre-Dame-du-Mont-Carmel.

Les Chenaux is one of the few regional county municipalities in Quebec that does not constitute its own census division; instead, it is grouped with Trois-Rivières as the single census division of Francheville.

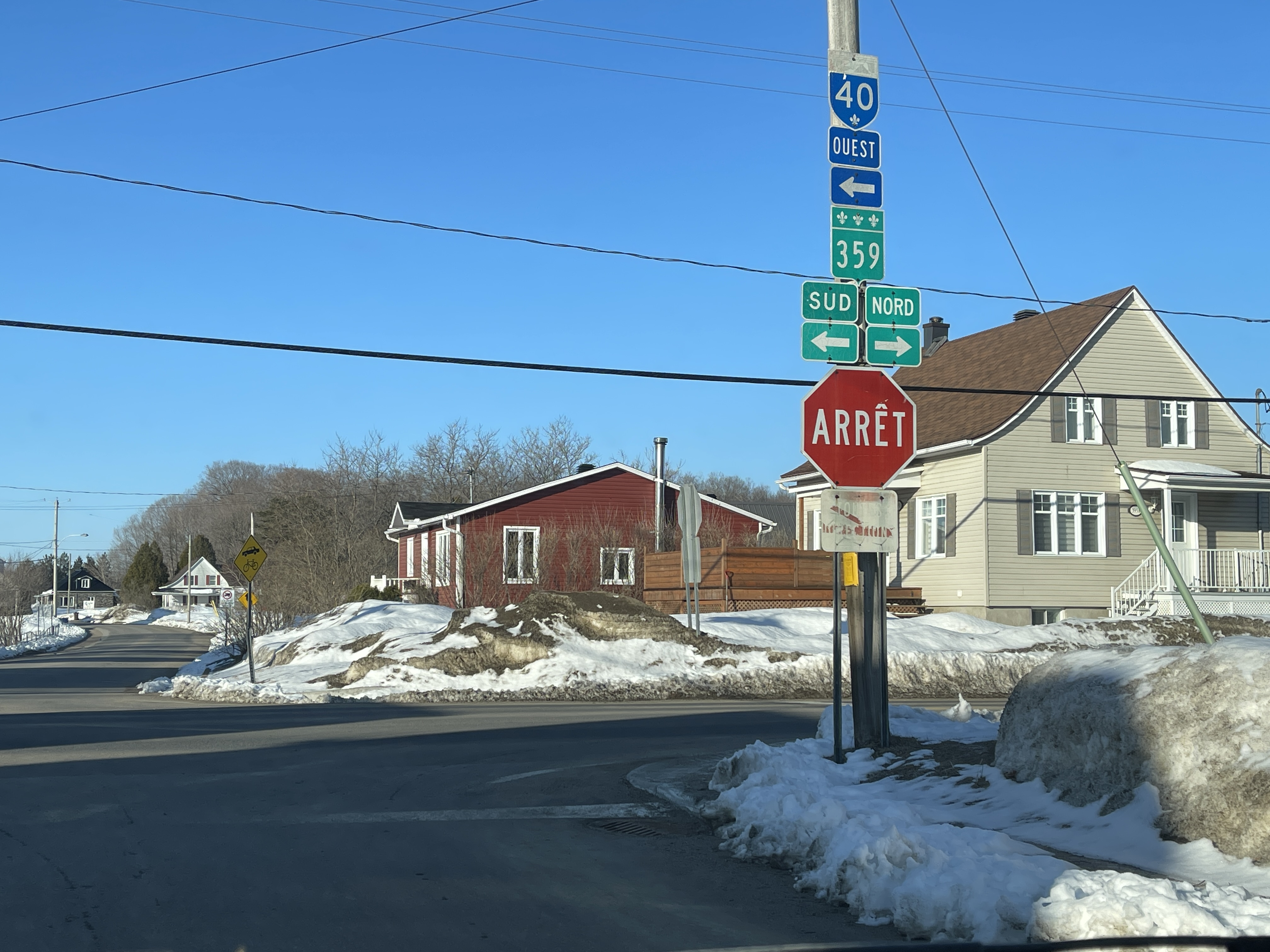
Saint-Luc-de-Vincennes, signs at the intersection of Route 359 South and North, Rang Saint-Alexis and direction to Highway 40

== Geography ==
The "Les Chenaux" RCM is an area east of Trois-Rivières, located between the villages of Champlain and Sainte-Anne-de-la-Pérade on north shore of St. Lawrence River. The MRC is approximately 40 km in length to about 20 kilometers in depth. The territory is crossed by three rivers flowing from north to south: Champlain River, Batiscan River and Sainte-Anne River.

== History ==
The RCM was created in 2002, when the area was realigned to make way for the amalgamations of nearby Trois-Rivières and Shawinigan. All of the municipalities, except for Notre-Dame-du-Mont-Carmel (which came from Centre-de-la-Mauricie RCM), used to belong to the former Francheville Regional County Municipality. This RCM was dissolved when six of its municipalities amalgamated with the city of Trois-Rivières, and Saint-Étienne-des-Grès was added to the Maskinongé RCM. The remaining municipalities were grouped into a new regional county called Les Chenaux.

== Subdivisions ==
There are 10 subdivisions within the RCM:

Municipalities (6)

- Batiscan
- Champlain
- Saint-Luc-de-Vincennes
- Saint-Prosper-de-Champlain
- Saint-Stanislas
- Sainte-Anne-de-la-Pérade

Parishes (4)

- Notre-Dame-du-Mont-Carmel
- Saint-Maurice
- Saint-Narcisse
- Sainte-Geneviève-de-Batiscan

=== Demography ===
Municipalities of "Les Chenaux" RCM
Municipality	Status	Area	Population (2006)	Density
Batiscan	Municipality	44,02 km^{2}	937 hab.	21,3 inhabitants/km^{2}
Champlain	Municipality	58,59 km^{2}	1 583 hab.	27,0 inhabitants/km^{2}
Notre-Dame-du-Mont-Carmel	Municipality of parish	126,61 km^{2}	5 300 hab.	41,9 inhabitants/km^{2}
Sainte-Anne-de-la-Pérade	Municipality	107,94 km^{2}	2 145 hab.	19,9 inhabitants/km^{2}
Sainte-Geneviève-de-Batiscan	Municipality of parish	97,09 km^{2}	1 125 hab.	11,6 inhabitants/km^{2}
Saint-Luc-de-Vincennes	Municipality	52,73 km^{2}	613 hab.	11,6 inhabitants/km^{2}
Saint-Maurice	Municipality of parish	90,33 km^{2}	2 308 hab.	25,6 inhabitants/km^{2}
Saint-Narcisse	Municipality of parish	103,49 km^{2}	1 852 hab.	17,9 inhabitants/km^{2}
Saint-Prosper	Municipality	92.03 km^{2}	555 hab.	6.0 inhabitants/km^{2}
Saint-Stanislas	Municipality	86,37 km^{2}	1 077 hab.	12,5 inhabitants/km^{2}
Total		859,20 km^{2}	17 495 hab.	20,4 inhabitants/km^{2}

== Transportation ==
=== Access routes ===
Highways and numbered routes that run through the municipality, including external routes that start or finish at the county border:

- Autoroutes
  - A-40
- Principal Highways
  - R-138
  - R-157
  - R-159
- Secondary Highways
  - R-352
  - R-354
  - R-359
  - R-361
  - R-209
- External Routes
  - None

== Photos ==
Land of running water and countless lakes

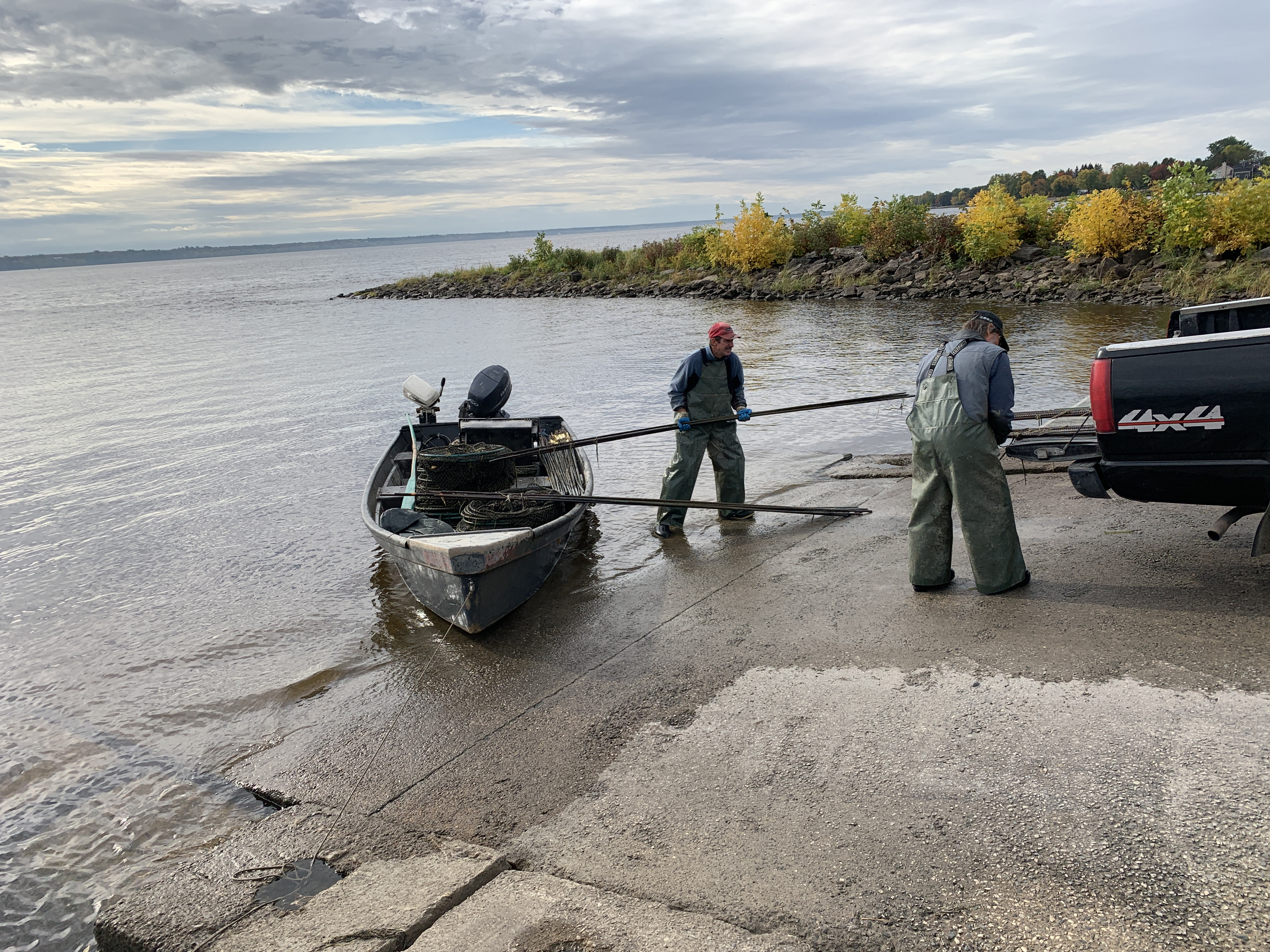
Batiscan, Slipway, commercial fisherman, St. Lawrence River

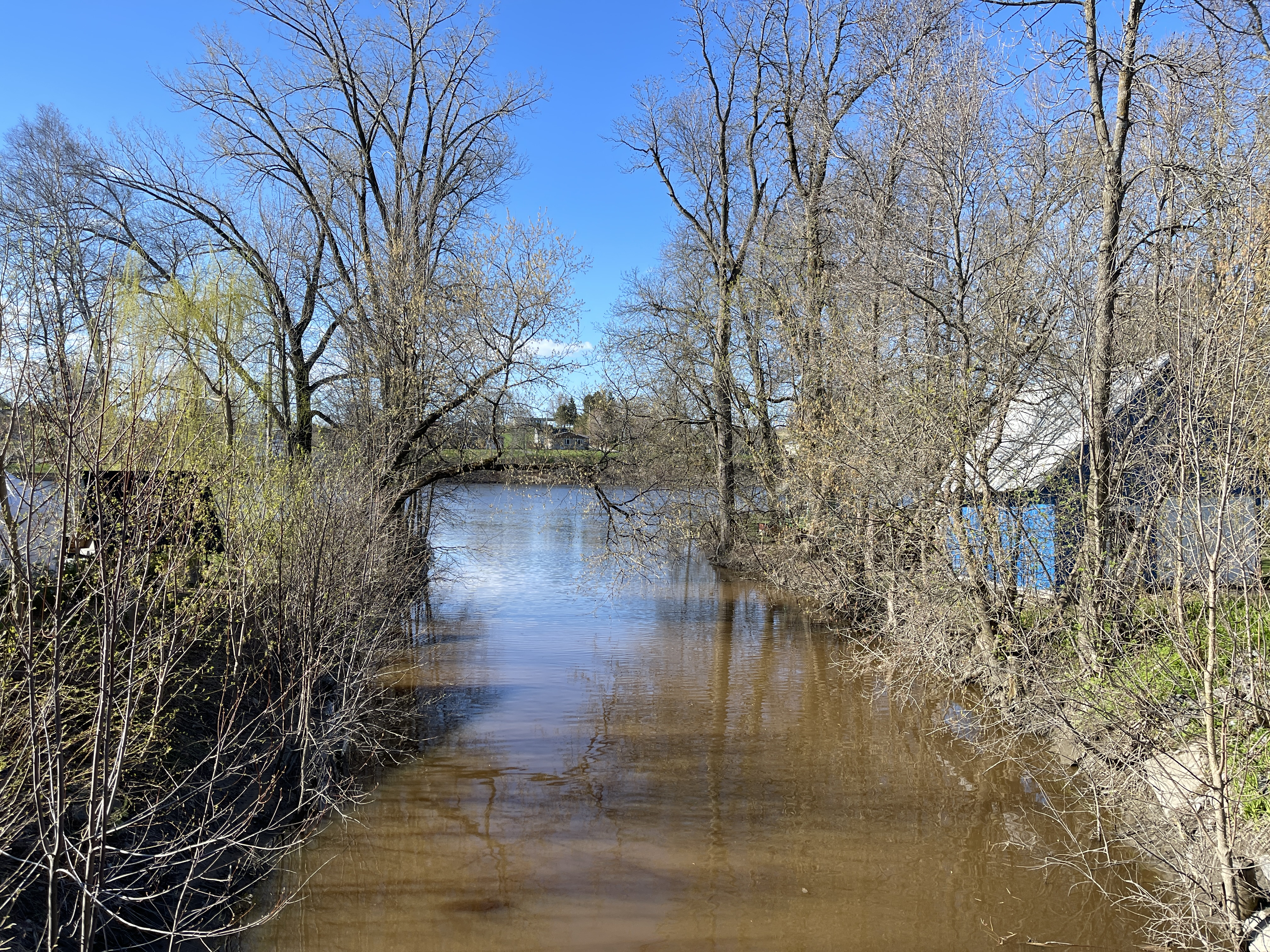
Sainte-Geneviève-de-Batiscan, the Rivière à Veillet flows into the Batiscan

Saint-Narcisse, Lac-à-la-Tortue bog

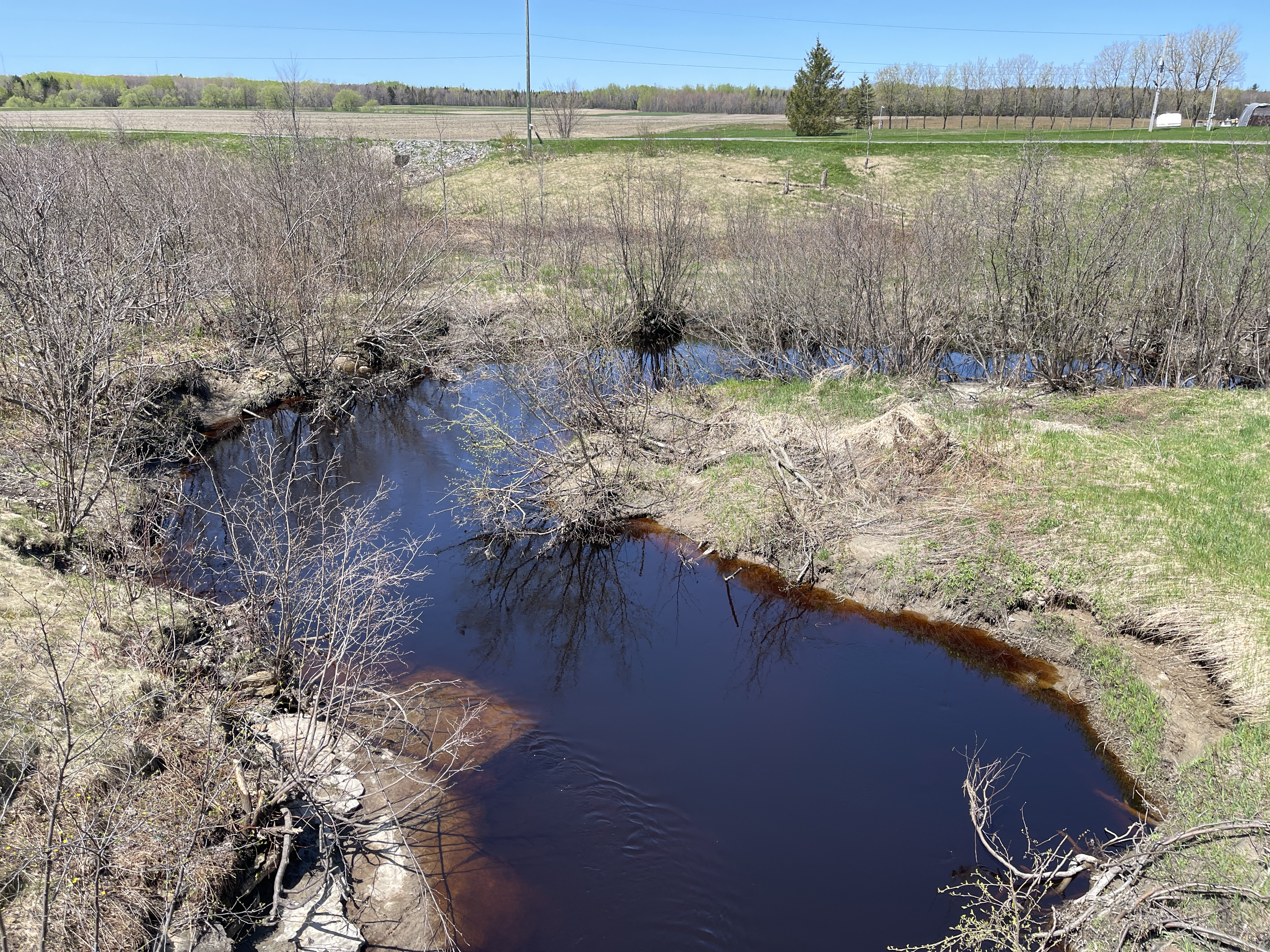
Saint-Maurice (Quebec), Au Lard River, agricultural zone

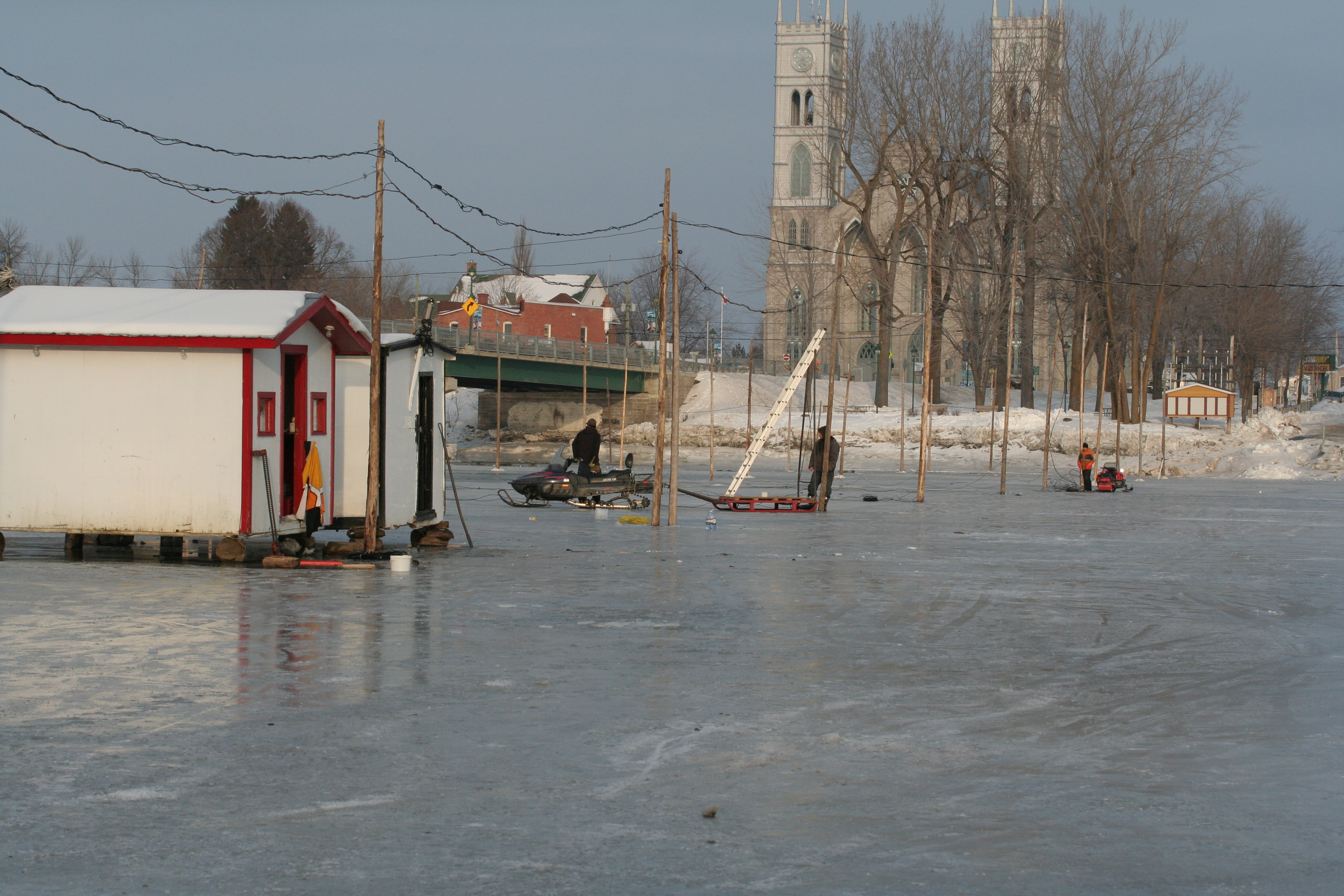
Sainte-Anne-de-la-Pérade, Ste-Anne river, the installation of the winter fishing village

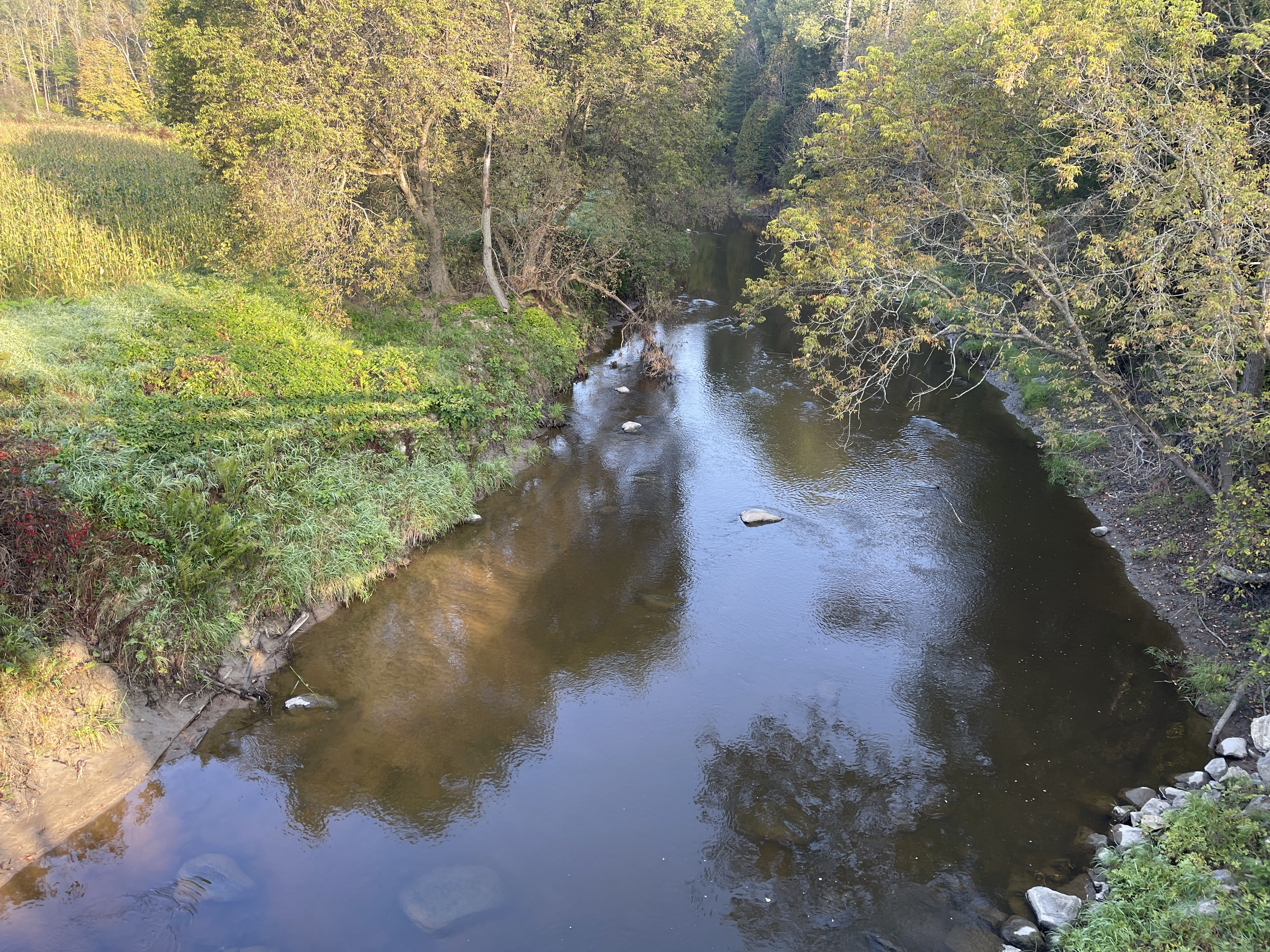
Saint-Prosper-de-Champlain, rivière Charest, tributary of the Sainte-Anne River

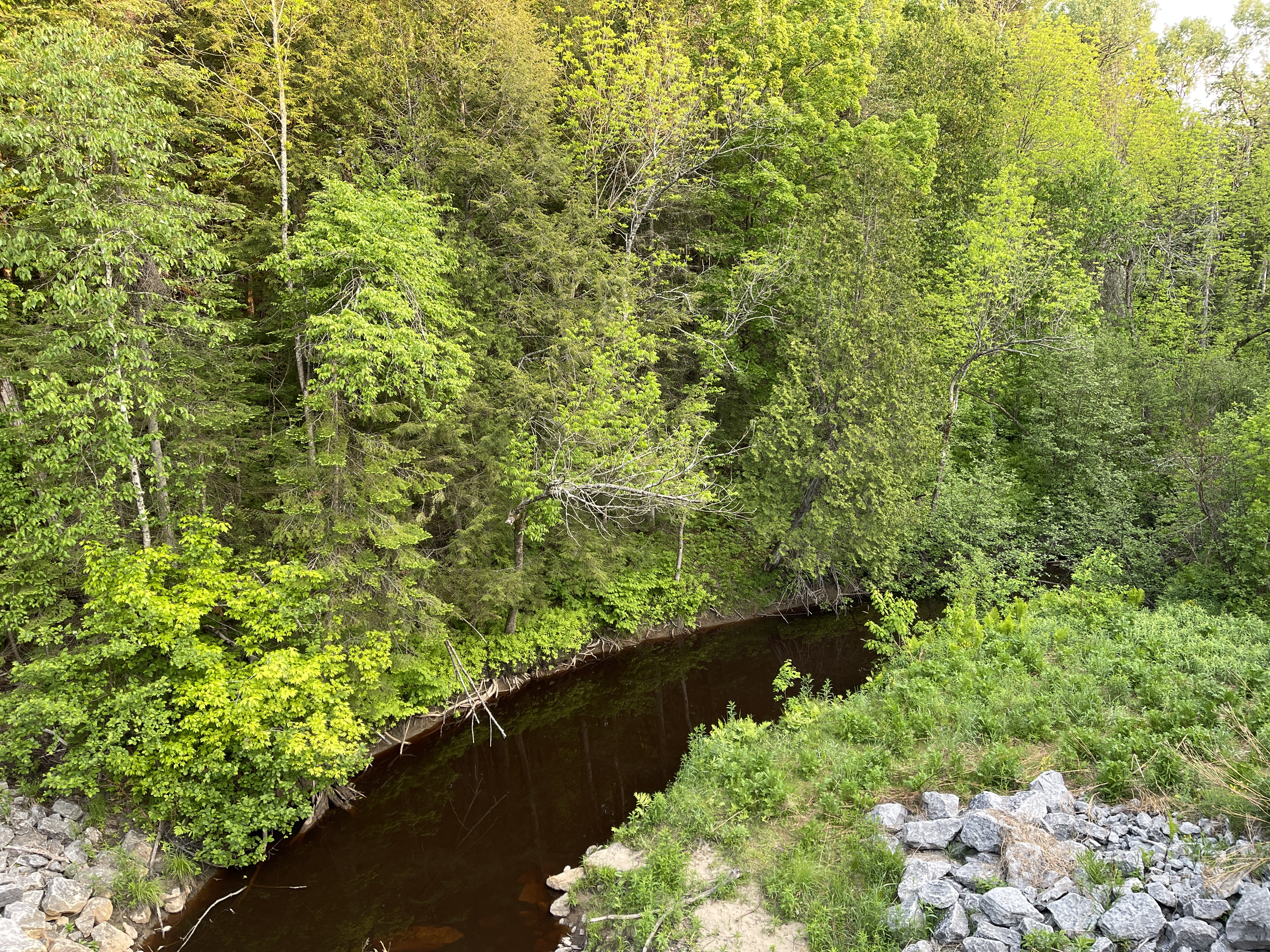
Notre-Dame-du-Mont-Carmel, Rivière Cachée

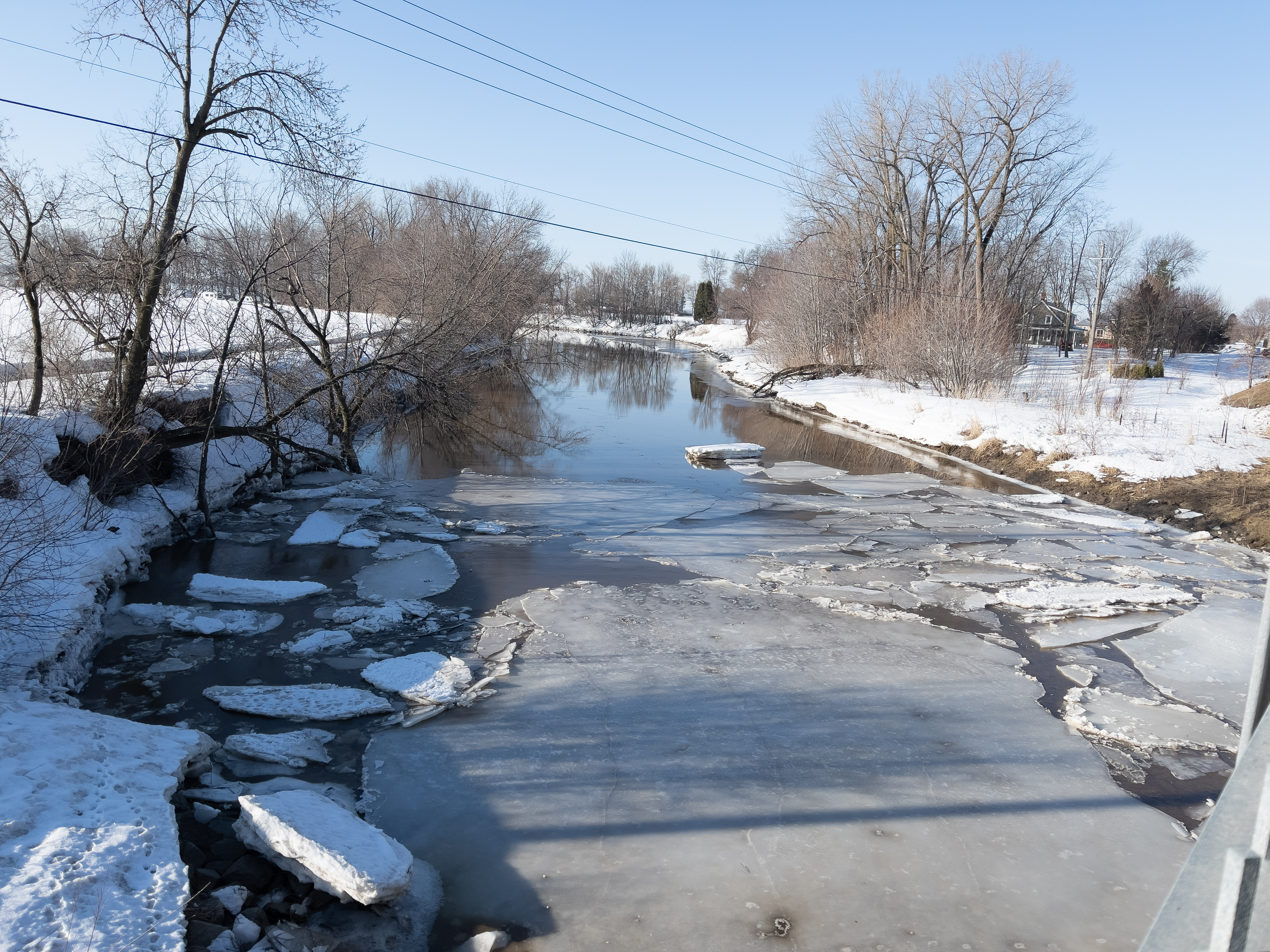
Champlain, Champlain River near its mouth

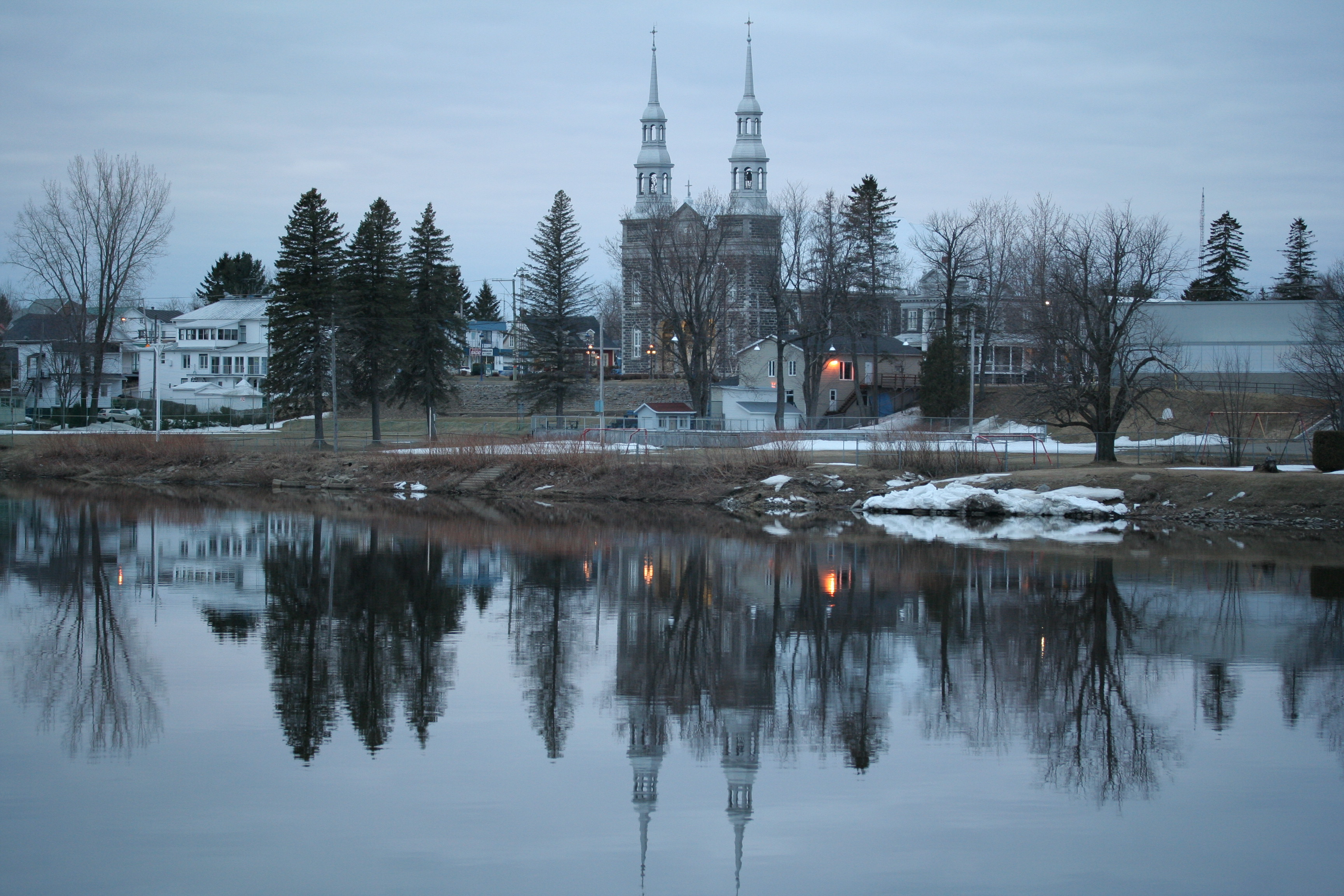
Saint-Stanislas, Batiscan River, Parish church, presbytery, municipality

== See also ==
- List of regional county municipalities and equivalent territories in Quebec
- Lordship of Sainte-Anne-de-la-Pérade
- Lordship of Batiscan
- Lordship of Champlain
