= Saint-Prosper-de-Champlain =

- Municipality
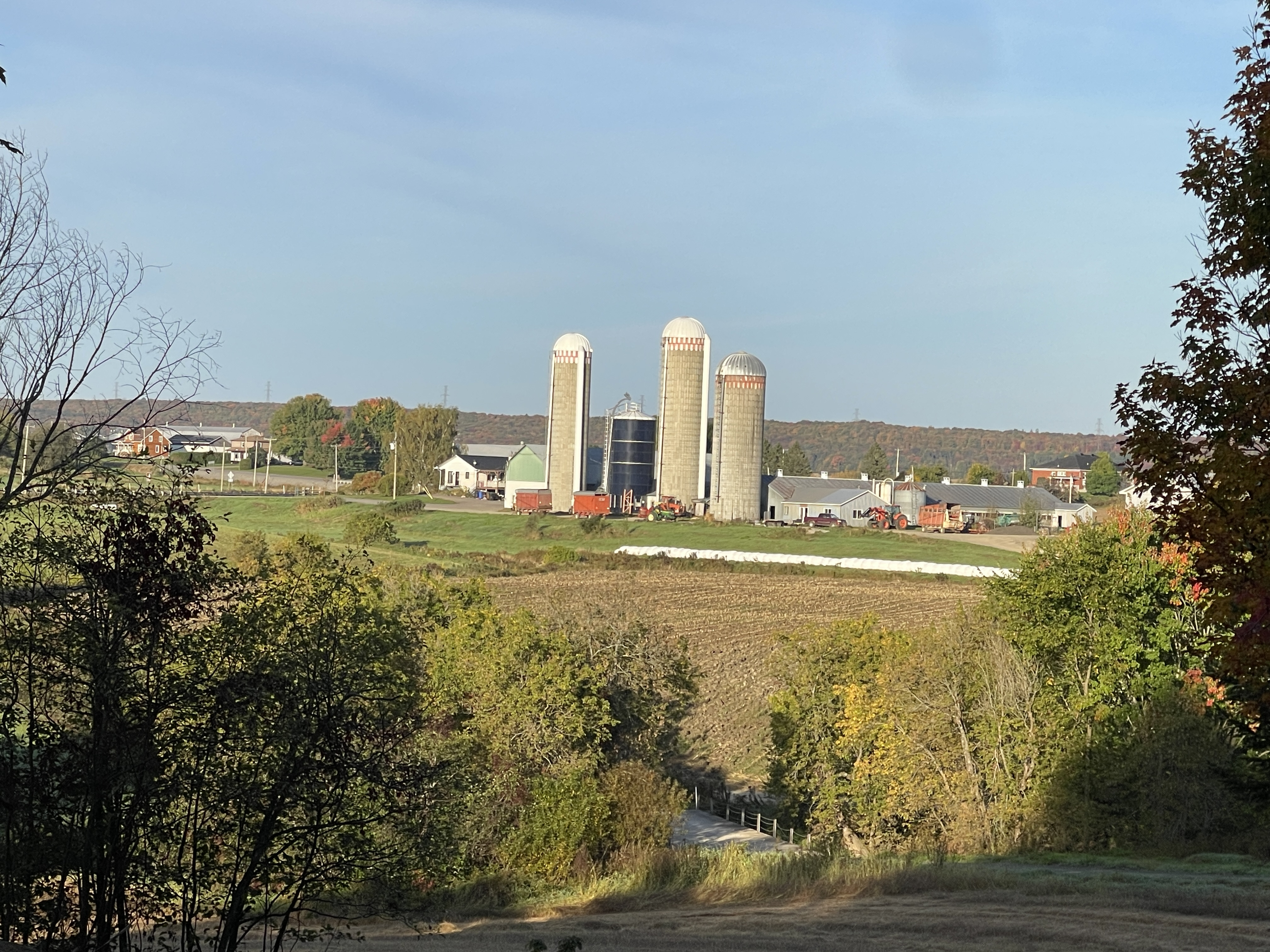
- Agricultural zone, Rang Ste-Elisabeth

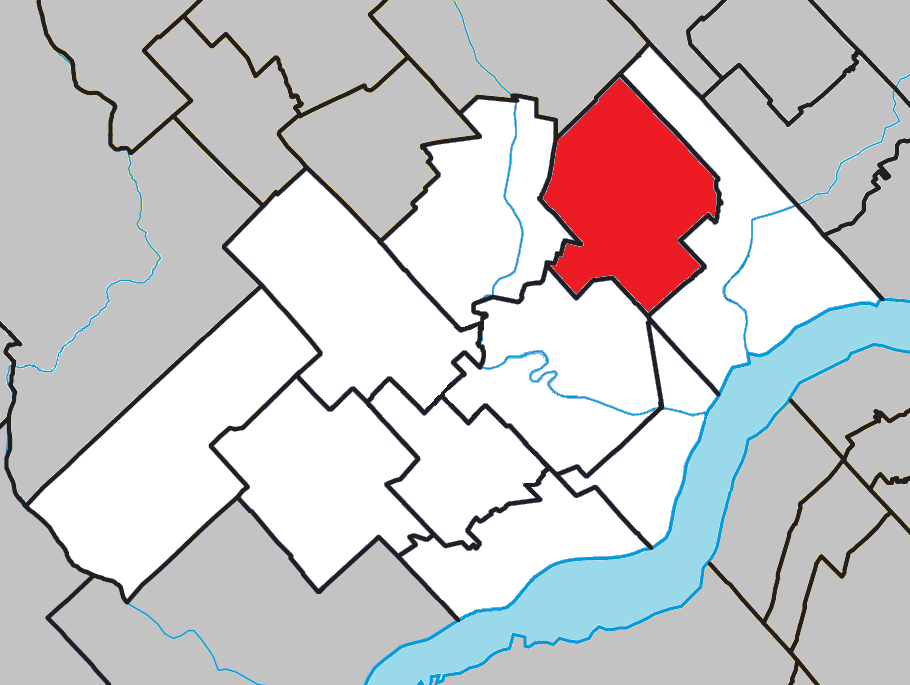
- Location within Les Chenaux RCM

- Location in central Quebec
- Coordinates: 46°37′N 72°17′W
- Country: Canada
- Province: Quebec
- Region: Mauricie
- RCM: Les Chenaux
- Settled: c. 1850
- Constituted: July 1, 1855

Government
  - Mayor: France Bédard
  - Fed. riding: Saint-Maurice—Champlain
  - Prov. riding: Champlain

Area
  - Total: 93.25 km^{2} (36.00 sq mi)
  - Land: 94.11 km^{2} (36.34 sq mi)
- There is an apparent discrepancy between 2 authoritative sources.

Population (2021)
  - Total: 482
  - Density: 5.1/km^{2} (13/sq mi)
  - Pop (2016-21): ▼9.1%
  - Dwellings: 264
- Time zone: UTC−5 (EST)
  - Summer (DST): UTC−4 (EDT)
- Postal code(s): G0X 3A0
- Area code: 418
- Highways: R-159
- Website: www.st-prosper.ca

Saint-Prosper-de-Champlain (French pronunciation: [sɛ̃ pʁɔspɛʁ də ʃɑ̃plɛ̃]) is a municipality of 482 people in the Les Chenaux Regional County Municipality, in Quebec, Canada. It is the smallest municipality in terms of population in the regional county.

== History ==
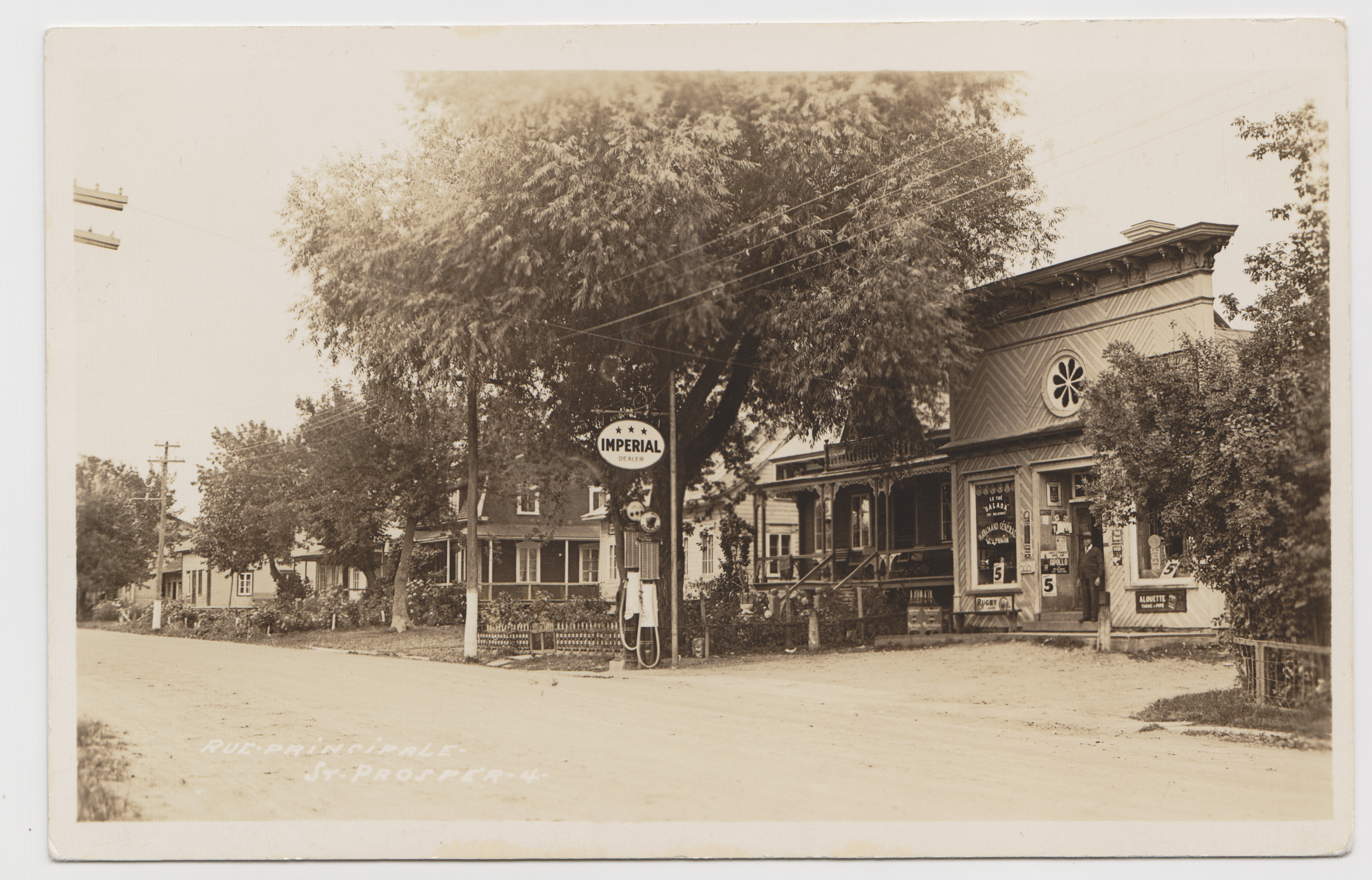
Rue Principale, 1940

The area opened up for colonization in the middle of the 19th century, and in 1850 the Parish of Saint-Prosper was established out of the territories of Sainte-Geneviève-de-Batiscan and Sainte-Anne-de-la-Pérade. It was named after Prosper of Aquitaine possibly by Bishop Joseph Signay who wanted to emphasize the "prosperity" of the first settlers, who were poor but brave. In 1853, its post office opened, and two years later, the Parish Municipality of Saint-Prosper was formed, with Augustin Massicotte as first mayor.

In 1861, Saint-Prosper had 1028 inhabitants, and at the start of 1900, there were nearly 1500 persons.

On December 31, 2001, it was transferred from the Francheville Regional County to the new Les Chenaux Regional County, following the creation of the new City of Trois-Rivières and the dissolution of the Francheville RCM.

Before September 4, 2010, it was known simply as Saint-Prosper, on that date, the Parish Municipality of Saint-Prosper changed its name and statutes to become the Municipality of Saint-Prosper-de-Champlain.

== Geography ==
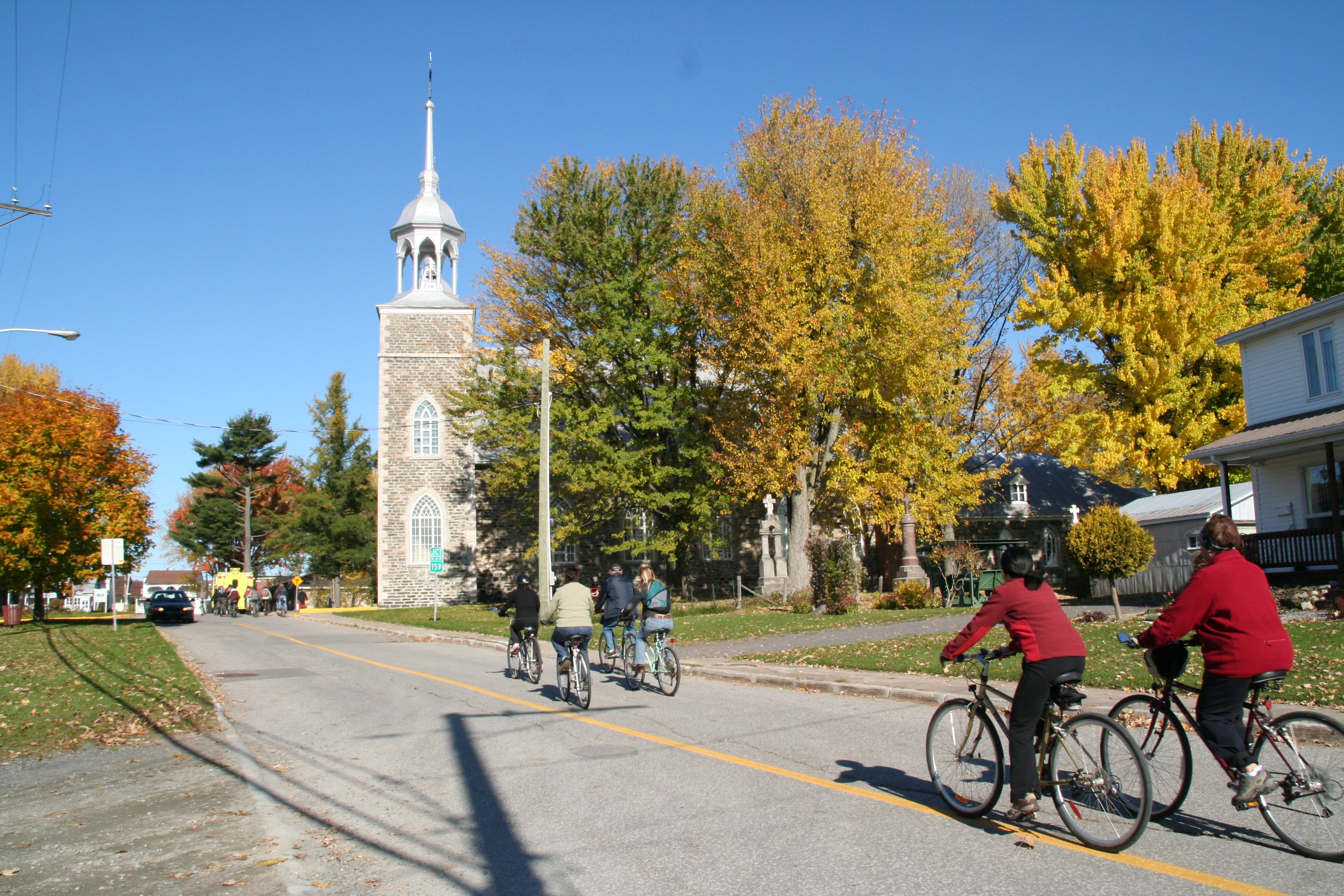
Rue de l'Église

The territory of Saint-Prosper-de-Champlain is mainly part of the Sainte-Anne River watershed. However, a small area to the west, bordering Saint-Stanislas and Sainte-Geneviève-de-Batiscan, is part of the Batiscanie region. The Charest River crosses the eastern part of the municipality from north-east to south-east.

== Demographics ==
=== Population ===
Canada census – Saint-Prosper-de-Champlain community profile

	2021	2016	2011
Population	482 (-9.1% from 2016)	530 (5.0% from 2011)	505 (-6.7% from 2006)
Land area	94.11 km^{2} (36.34 sq mi)	94.02 km^{2} (36.30 sq mi)	93.68 km^{2} (36.17 sq mi)
Population density	5.1/km^{2} (13/sq mi)	5.6/km^{2} (15/sq mi)	5.4/km^{2} (14/sq mi)
Median age	56.8 (M: 56.4, F: 57.2)	52.8 (M: 53.4, F: 52.2)	51.8 (M: 51.5, F: 52.2)
Private dwellings	264 (total) 244 (occupied)	267 (total)	268 (total)
Median household income	$55,600	$47,744	$46,731

References: 2021 2016 2011

Historical census populations – Saint-Prosper-de-Champlain

Year	Pop.	±%
1861	1,028	—
1871	1,147	+11.6%
1881	1,382	+20.5%
1891	1,358	−1.7%
1901	1,334	−1.8%
1911	1,316	−1.3%
1921	1,187	−9.8%
1931	1,167	−1.7%

Year	Pop.	±%
1941	1,133	−2.9%
1951	1,172	+3.4%
1956	1,230	+4.9%
1961	1,129	−8.2%
1966	999	−11.5%
1971	886	−11.3%
1976	797	−10.0%
1981	663	−16.8%

Year	Pop.	±%
1986	628	−5.3%
1991	584	−7.0%
1996	548	−6.2%
2001	631	+15.1%
2006	541	−14.3%
2011	505	−6.7%
2016	530	+5.0%
2021	482	−9.1%

Source: Statistics Canada

=== Language ===
Canada Census Mother Tongue - Saint-Prosper-de-Champlain, Quebec
Census	Total	French			English			French & English			Other		
Year	Responses	Count	Trend	Pop %	Count	Trend	Pop %	Count	Trend	Pop %	Count	Trend	Pop %
2021	480	475	▼8.7%	99.0%	0	0.0%	0.0%	0	0.0%	0.0%	0	0.0%	0.0%
2016	520	520	▲3.0%	100.0%	0	0.0%	0.0%	0	0.0%	0.0%	0	0.0%	0.0%
2011	505	505	▼6.5%	100.0%	0	0.0%	0.0%	0	0.0%	0.0%	0	0.0%	0.0%
2006	540	540	▲1.9%	100.0%	0	▼100.0%	0.0%	0	0.0%	0.0%	0	0.0%	0.0%
2001	535	530	▼4.5%	99.1%	10	▲ n/a%	1.9%	0	0.0%	0.0%	0	0.0%	0.0%
1996	555	555	n/a	100.0%	0	n/a	0.0%	0	n/a	0.0%	0	n/a	0.0%

== See also ==
- Charest River
- Rivière à Veillet
