= Sainte-Geneviève-de-Batiscan =

- Parish municipality
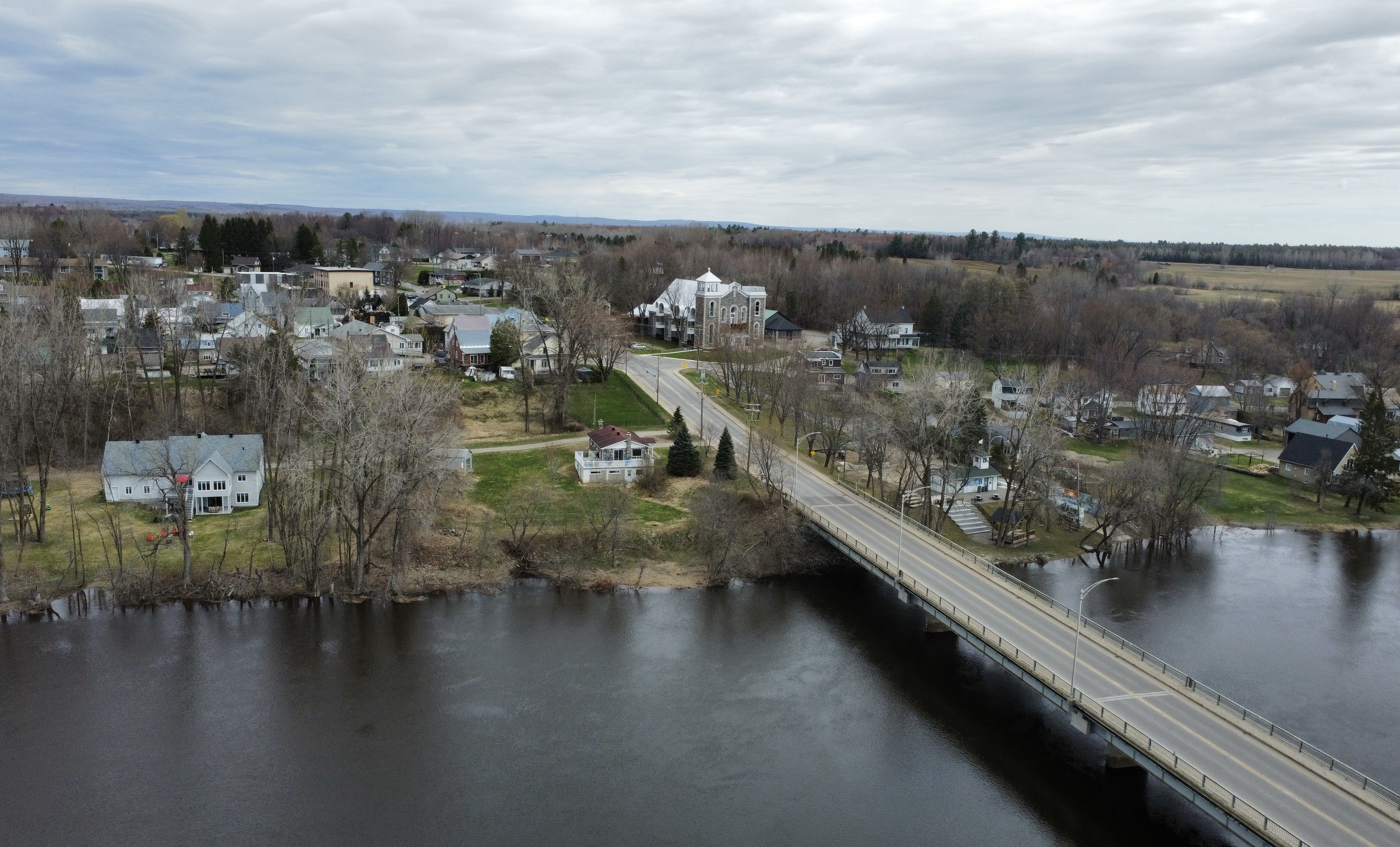
- Motto: Venus pour demeurer ("Came to Stay")
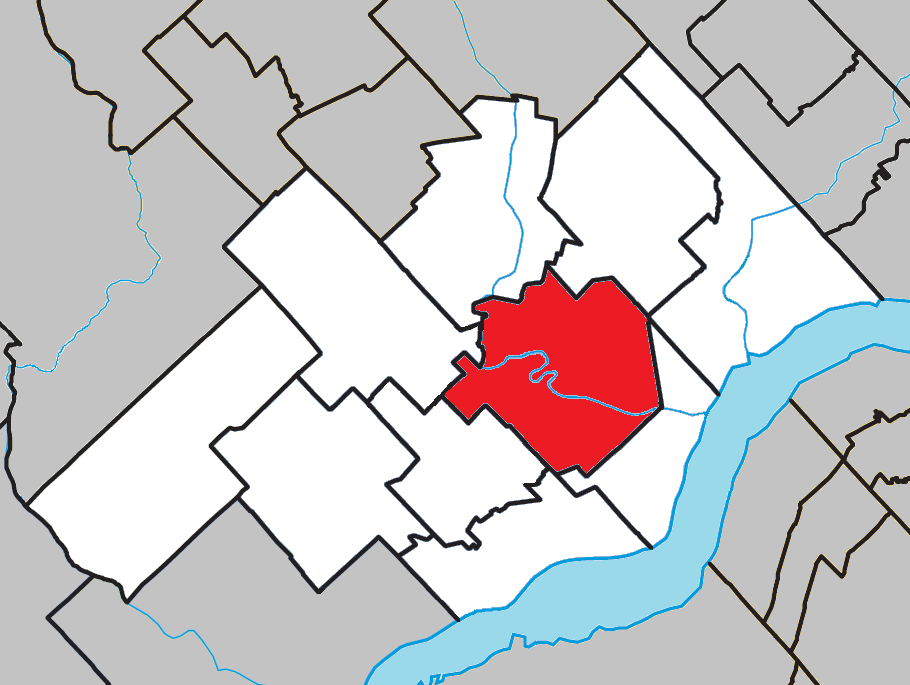
- Location within Les Chenaux RCM

- Location in central Quebec
- Coordinates: 46°32′N 72°20′W
- Country: Canada
- Province: Quebec
- Region: Mauricie
- RCM: Les Chenaux
- Constituted: July 1, 1855

Government
  - Mayor: Christian Gendron
  - Fed. riding: Saint-Maurice—Champlain
  - Prov. riding: Champlain

Area
  - Total: 100.38 km^{2} (38.76 sq mi)
  - Land: 97.65 km^{2} (37.70 sq mi)

Population (2021)
  - Total: 1,028
  - Density: 10.5/km^{2} (27/sq mi)
  - Pop (2016-21): ▲2.2%
  - Dwellings: 571
- Time zone: UTC−5 (EST)
  - Summer (DST): UTC−4 (EDT)
- Postal code(s): G0X 2R0
- Area codes: 418 and 581
- Highways A-40: R-361
- Website: www.stegenevieve.ca

Sainte-Geneviève-de-Batiscan (French pronunciation: [sɛ̃t ʒənvjɛv də batiskɑ̃]) is a parish municipality in the Mauricie region of the province of Quebec in Canada. This municipality is part of the Les Chenaux Regional County Municipality in Batiscanie. It is located along the Batiscan River.

The town of Sainte-Geneviève-de-Batiscan was the seat of the Lordship of Batiscan from 1665 and Champlain County from 1855 to 1981. During the first centuries of its history, the economy of the area has been focused on forestry, agriculture, fishing and river transport. Sainte-Geneviève was also a prominent center of trade for the Batiscanie.

Initially, the Catholic parish was named in honour of Saint Genevieve, patron saint of France and the city of Paris, the largest French-speaking city in the world. In France, the French patron saint is also the Diocese of Nanterre and gendarmes.

The name "Batiscan" was derived from the chief of the Algonquin people from around 1610 to 1629, for whom the river was named after.

== History ==
The municipality of Sainte-Genevieve de Batiscan was erected May 11, 1841, in the southeastern part of the Lordship of Batiscan under the Act 8 Vict. chap. 40, in July 1845. The territory of municipality of Sainte-Geneviève was detached from the parishes of Saint-François-Xavier-de-Batiscan and La Visitation de Champlain.

=== Catholic Parish ===
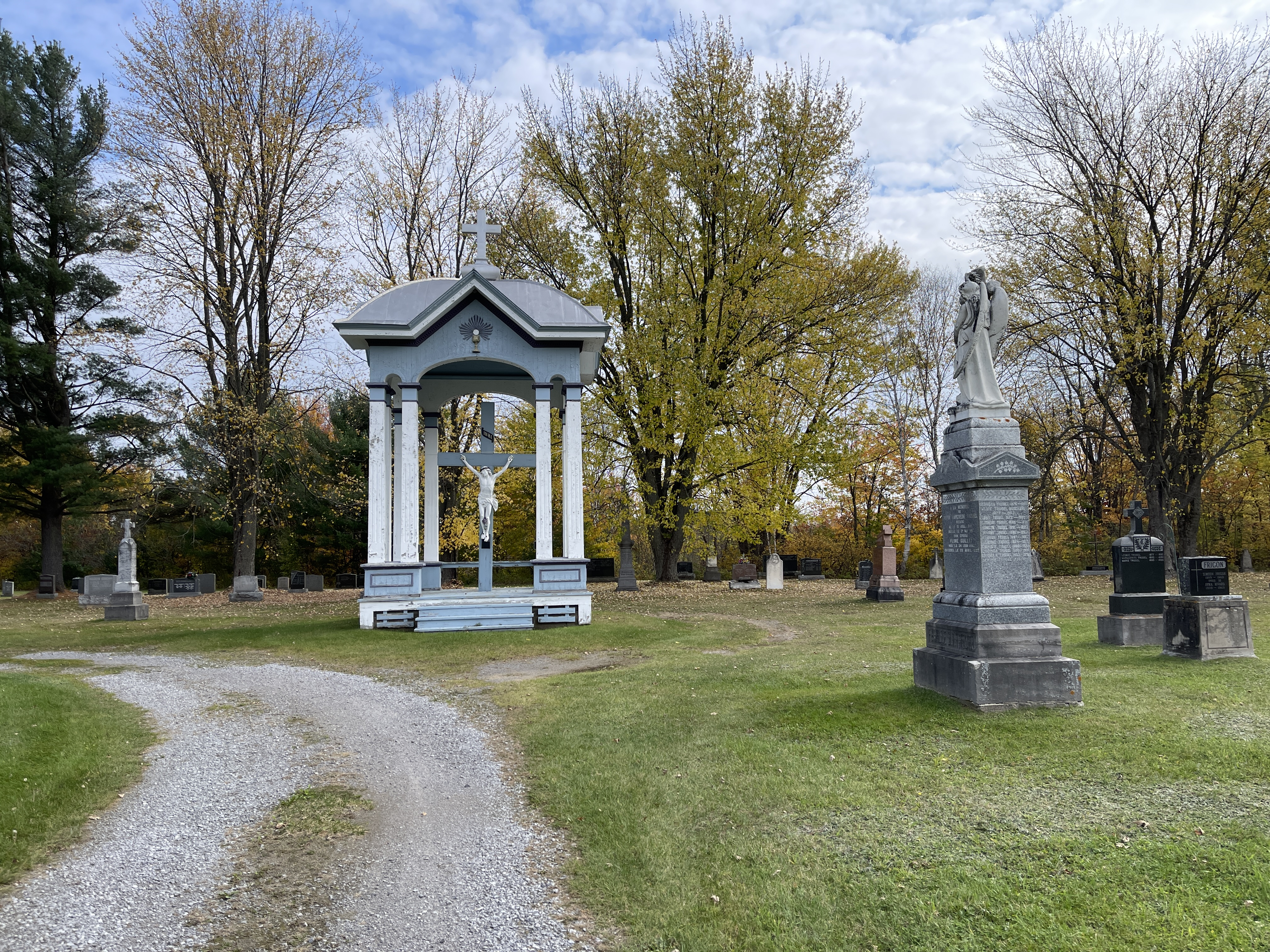
Cemetery of the parish of Sainte-Élizabeth, rue de l'Église

The civil records of Sainte-Genevieve de Batiscan start in July 1727 and are administered by the neighboring parish of Saint-François-Xavier-de-Batiscan up to the canonical erection of the Catholic parish of Sainte-Genevieve de Batiscan, which occurred on August 16, 1833. This Catholic parish falls within the Diocese of Trois-Rivières. A priest or a pastor serving resides since 1728.

== Geography ==
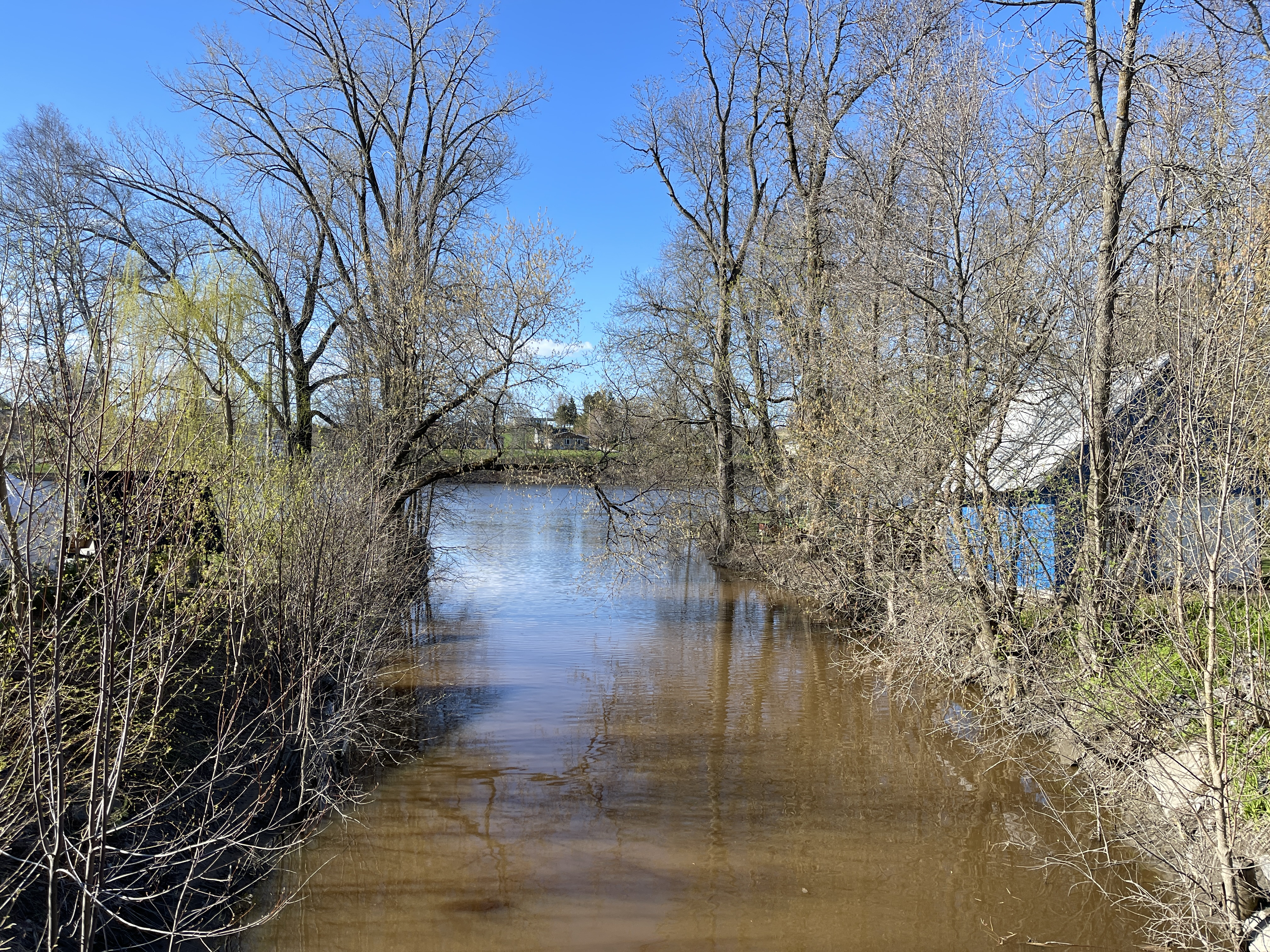
Rivière à Veillet flows into the Batiscan River, Principale Street

The main village is situated on the northeast shore of the Batiscan River at the confluence of the Veillet River, while a small village is located just opposite, on the south-west. The village center is located about 6.3 km (4 mi) from the mouth of the Batiscan River and 7.6 km (5 mi) from the Batiscan railway station, on the former Canadian Pacific Railway line (now run in this area by Quebec Gatineau Railway). The Batiscan River through the village and splits into two parts.

The agricultural area of Sainte-Geneviève-de-Batiscan stops at the foot of the Saint-Narcisse moraine. It is a mountainous line in the east-west direction, between Sainte-Geneviève-de-Batiscan with Saint-Stanislas and Saint-Narcisse. Most of Sainte-Geneviève-de-Batiscan is included in the Batiscanie, except for two areas: one in the east, at the limit of Sainte-Anne-de-la-Pérade, and the other to the southwest, near the limit of Saint-Luc-de-Vincennes.

== Demographics ==
=== Population ===
In the 2021 Census of Population conducted by Statistics Canada, Sainte-Geneviève-de-Batiscan had a population of 1,028 living in 514 of its 571 total private dwellings, a change of 2.2% from its 2016 population of 1,006. With a land area of 97.65 km^{2} (37.70 sq mi), it had a population density of 10.5/km^{2} (27.3/sq mi) in 2021.

Canada census – Sainte-Geneviève-de-Batiscan, Quebec community profile

	2021	2016	2011
Population	1,028 (+2.2% from 2016)	1,006 (-5.1% from 2011)	1,060 (2.3% from 2006)
Land area	97.65 km^{2} (37.70 sq mi)	97.82 km^{2} (37.77 sq mi)	98.21 km^{2} (37.92 sq mi)
Population density	10.5/km^{2} (27/sq mi)	10.3/km^{2} (27/sq mi)	10.8/km^{2} (28/sq mi)
Median age	57.2 (M: 57.2, F: 57.2)	54.6 (M: 55.0, F: 54.2)	51.2 (M: 51.2, F: 51.1)
Private dwellings	571 (total) 514 (occupied)	608 (total)	543 (total)
Median household income	$62,400	$52,096	$48,522

References: 2021 2016 2011

Historical census populations – Sainte-Geneviève-de-Batiscan

Year	Pop.	±%
1861	2,171	—
1871	2,277	+4.9%
1881	2,294	+0.7%
1891	1,985	−13.5%
1901	1,814	−8.6%
1911	1,847	+1.8%
1921	1,725	−6.6%
1931	1,683	−2.4%

Year	Pop.	±%
1941	1,467	−12.8%
1951	1,319	−10.1%
1956	1,372	+4.0%
1961	1,298	−5.4%
1966	1,314	+1.2%
1971	1,152	−12.3%
1976	1,150	−0.2%
1981	1,091	−5.1%

Year	Pop.	±%
1986	1,088	−0.3%
1991	1,086	−0.2%
1996	1,044	−3.9%
2001	1,082	+3.6%
2006	1,036	−4.3%
2011	1,060	+2.3%
2016	1,006	−5.1%
2021	1,028	+2.2%

Source: Statistics Canada

=== Language ===
Canada Census Mother Tongue - Sainte-Geneviève-de-Batiscan, Quebec
Census	Total	French			English			French & English			Other		
Year	Responses	Count	Trend	Pop %	Count	Trend	Pop %	Count	Trend	Pop %	Count	Trend	Pop %
2021	1,030	1,015	▲3.0%	98.5%	5	▼50.0%	0.5%	5	0.0%	0.5%	10	▲100.0%	1.0%
2016	1,005	985	▼14.4%	98.0%	10	0.0%	1.0%	5	0.0%	0.5%	5	0.0%	0.5%
2011	1,060	1,040	▲1.5%	98.1%	10	▲ n/a%	0.9%	5	▲ n/a%	0.5%	5	▲ n/a%	0.5%
2006	1,030	1,025	▼3.8%	99.5%	0	0.0%	0.0%	0	0.0%	0.0%	0	0.0%	0.0%
2001	1,070	1,065	▲3.9%	99.5%	0	0.0%	0.0%	0	0.0%	0.0%	0	▼100.0%	0.0%
1996	1,040	1,025	n/a	98.6%	0	n/a	0.0%	0	n/a	0.0%	15	n/a	1.4%

== Government ==
=== Regional Administration ===
From 1855 to 1982, the city was the seat of Champlain County. In 1982, the old county system was reformulated into the new regional county municipality (RCM) system, with Sainte-Geneviève-de-Batiscan becoming part of the Francheville RCM. On December 31, 2001, it was transferred from the Francheville RCM to the new Les Chenaux RCM, following the creation of the new City of Trois-Rivières and the dissolution of the Francheville RCM.

== Notable people ==
- Jacques J. Bouchard

== See also ==
- Batiscan, Quebec
- Champlain, Quebec
