= Batiscan =

17th-century indigenous chief in Eastern Canada

Batiscan (or Batisquan) was a chief of the Algonquin people in the area of Trois-Rivières, Quebec around 1610 to 1629. He met the explorer Samuel de Champlain upon his return to Quebec in 1610 and held a feast for him. In 1611, Champlain met Batiscan again, and the chief provided him with useful information about other tribes in the area, although he declined to provide guides for exploring the region of Saint-Maurice River. In June 1629, Champlain suggested the formation of a council of five chiefs. The proposal was approved by a general council of the indigenous people of the region. Batiscan served on the board of the five counts. However, this takes place shortly before the British capture of Quebec in July 1629.
