= Rivière à la Tortue =

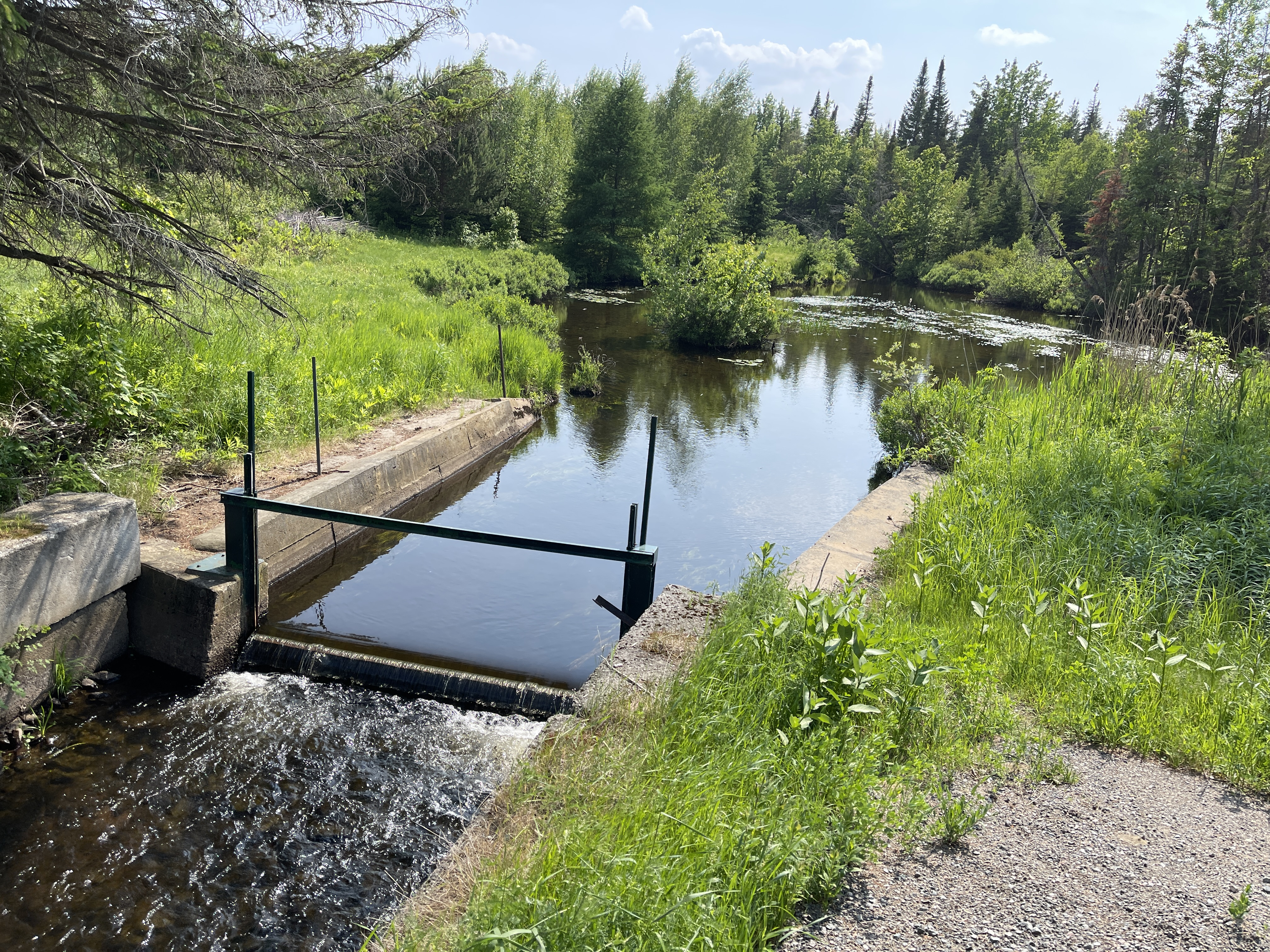
- Dam, Grande-Ligne Road, Hérouxville

- Location within Quebec

Location
- Country: Canada
- Province: Quebec
- Region: Mauricie
- Municipality: Hérouxville

Physical characteristics
- Source: Lac à la Tortue
  - location: Hérouxville
  - coordinates: 46°38′31″N 72°36′09″W
  - elevation: 131
- Mouth: Batiscan River
  - location: Saint-Stanislas
  - coordinates: 46°37′43″N 72°25′13″W
  - elevation: 110 m
- Length: 20.4 km (12.7 mi)

Basin features
- Tributaries
  - left: (Upward from the mouth)
  - right: (Upward from the mouth)

The Rivière à la Tortue (French pronunciation: [ʁivjɛʁ a la tɔʁty]; English translation: "Turtle River") flows in the Mauricie Region in the province of Quebec, Canada. It has its source at the mouth of à la Tortue lake. The river flows east in the municipalities of Hérouxville, Saint-Séverin and Saint-Stanislas, in Mékinac and Les Chenaux RCM (Regional County Municipality) in Mauricie, Quebec.

== Geography ==
Dam on the Turtle River

The dam that regulates the discharge of water from Lac à la Tortue, and ensures the management of the water level, is located on the Turtle River, near Chemin de la Grande Ligne, in Hérouxville. It is about 800 meters from the outlet of the lake and was the subject of a major restoration in 1999. (Translate from french)
— Learn more about the Turtle River Dam, by Francois St-Onge.

Without prejudice

The Rivière à la Tortue takes its source at the mouth of Lac à la Tortue (northern part of the lake which is located in Hérouxville). The southern part of this lake is located in the Lac-à-la-Tortue sector of Shawinigan.

From the "Lac à la Tortue", the river turns a priori towards the northeast. It subsequently crosses:

- Rang 10 of Hérouxville, on 0.7 kilometres (0.43 mi), to cross the road of the Grande-Ligne which constitutes the line of separation of the seigneuries of Batiscan and of Champlain;
- Rang Saint-Pierre (south-west) of Hérouxville on 1.3 kilometres (0.81 mi). Tributary: Drouin and Brouillette watercourse (comprising the Adam-Cossette branch);
- Rang Saint-Pierre (north-east) of Hérouxville for 2.4 km in a straight line (or 3.1 km following the course of the river), where the river makes a large curve to the right in heading southeast. Then, the course of the river enters in Saint-Narcisse, by the northwest end (range "Côte St-Pierre - Coté Nord-Est"), where it crosses four lots, on 1.4 kilometres (0.87 mi), measured by following the course of the river. Tributary: Bordeleau and Jacques watercourse;
- Rang Saint-Paul (south-west side) Saint-Sévérin, on 4.6 km in a direct line (or 5.8 km following the course of the river). Tributaries: discharge from the Rang Saint-Pierre bay, Delfi and Ayotte rivers (including the Lafrance branch);
- Rang Saint-Paul (northeast) in Saint-Sévérin, 1.9 km in a direct line (or 2.3 km following the course of the river). Tributary: Lépine stream. The Turtle River cuts Côte Saint-Paul Road approximately 3.2 kilometres (2.0 mi) southeast of the Côte Saint-Louis intersection;
- Saint-Louis concession (southwest), 1.2 km in a direct line (1.7 km following the course of the river), on lots 158–159. The river intersects Chemin Saint-Louis about 0.6 kilometres (0.37 mi) from the intersection of route 159;
- the southwest range of the Envies river in Saint-Stanislas, 2.8 km in a direct line (4 km following the route). Tributaries: Brûlé stream (lot 280) and Gignac stream (lot 288).

Finally, the river flows into the Rivière des Envies in Saint-Stanislas, near the current bridge of the route 159, at 3, 5 km from the mouth of the Envies river.

The Turtle River sub-basin is located between that of Rivière des Envies (to the northeast) and that of Rivière des Chutes (to the southeast ). The distance in a direct line, between its source and its mouth, is 14 km (or 20.4 km following the course of the river).

== Photos ==
Rivière à la Tortue - Turtle River in the rain
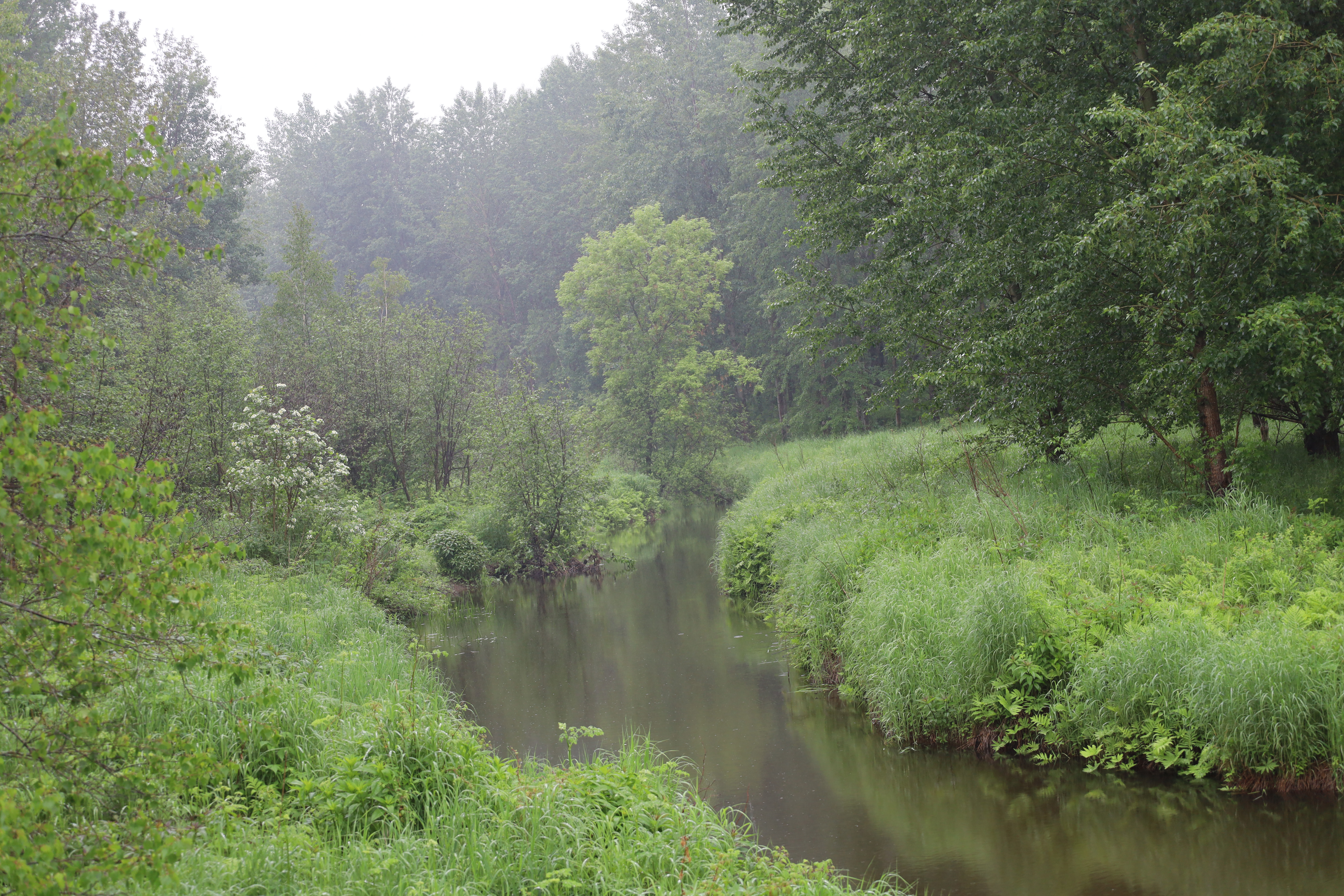
Rang Saint-Pierre Sud, Hérouxville

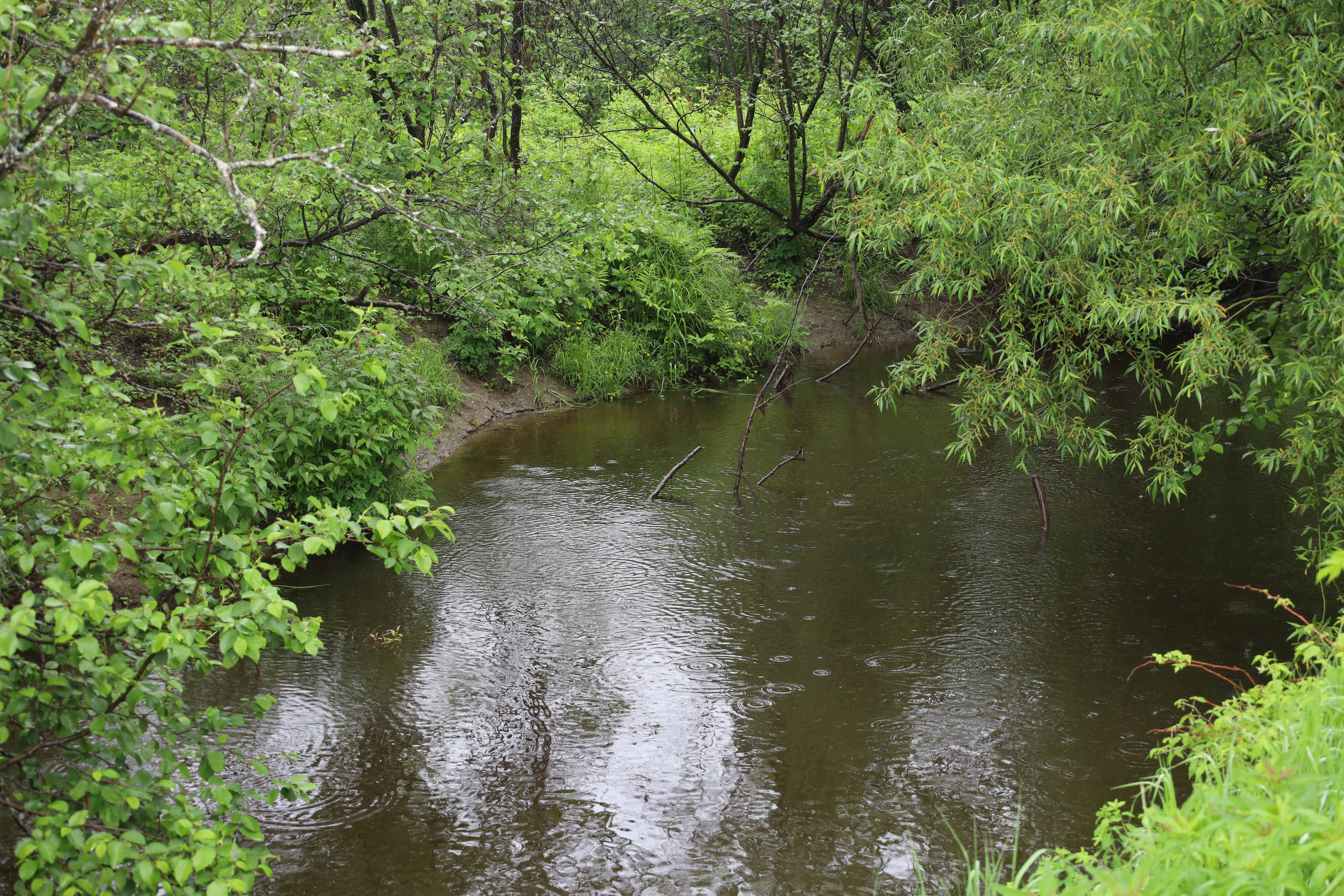
Rang Saint-Pierre Sud, Hérouxville

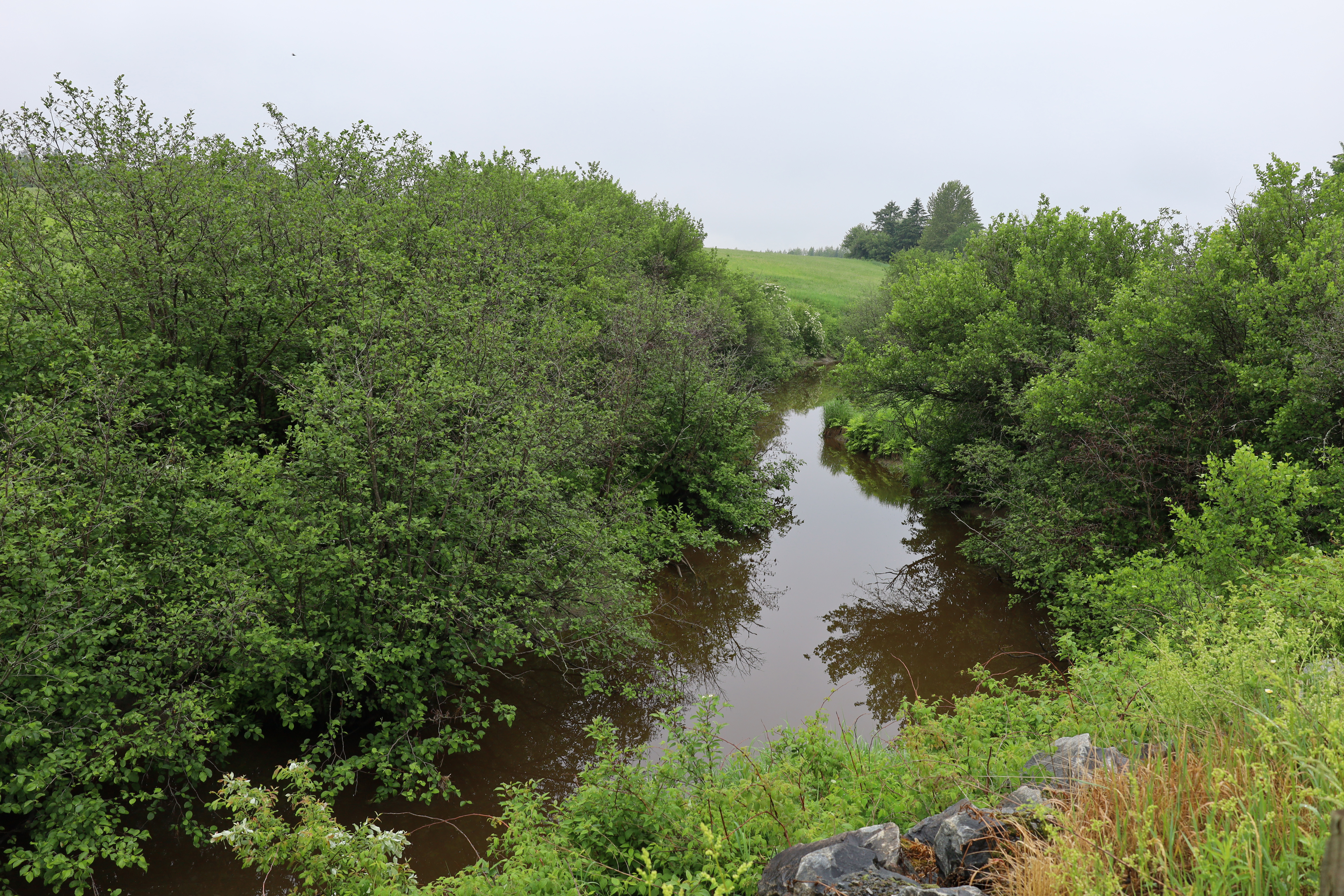
Cote-Saint-Paul Road, Saint-Severin

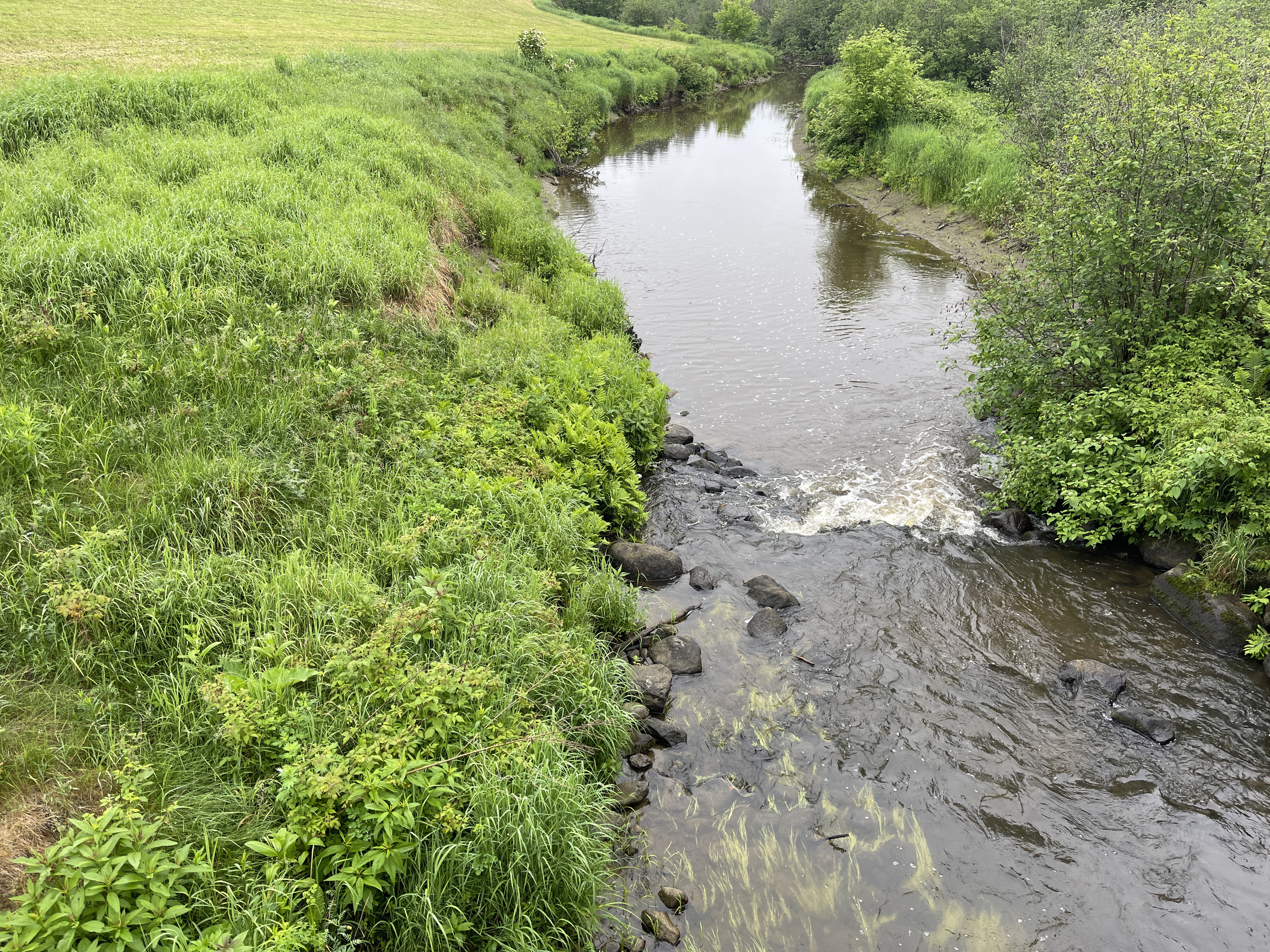
Cote-Saint-Paul Road, Saint-Séverin

== Toponymy ==
The origin of this name and, if so, its meaning could not be determined until now.
— Rivière à la Tortue, Origin and meaning (fr)

== See also ==
- Hérouxville
- Saint-Sévérin
- Saint-Stanislas
- Lac-à-la-Tortue
- Rivière des Envies
- Batiscan River
- Batiscanie
- Mékinac Regional County Municipality
- Les Chenaux Regional County Municipality
- List of rivers of Quebec
