= Rivière des Chutes =

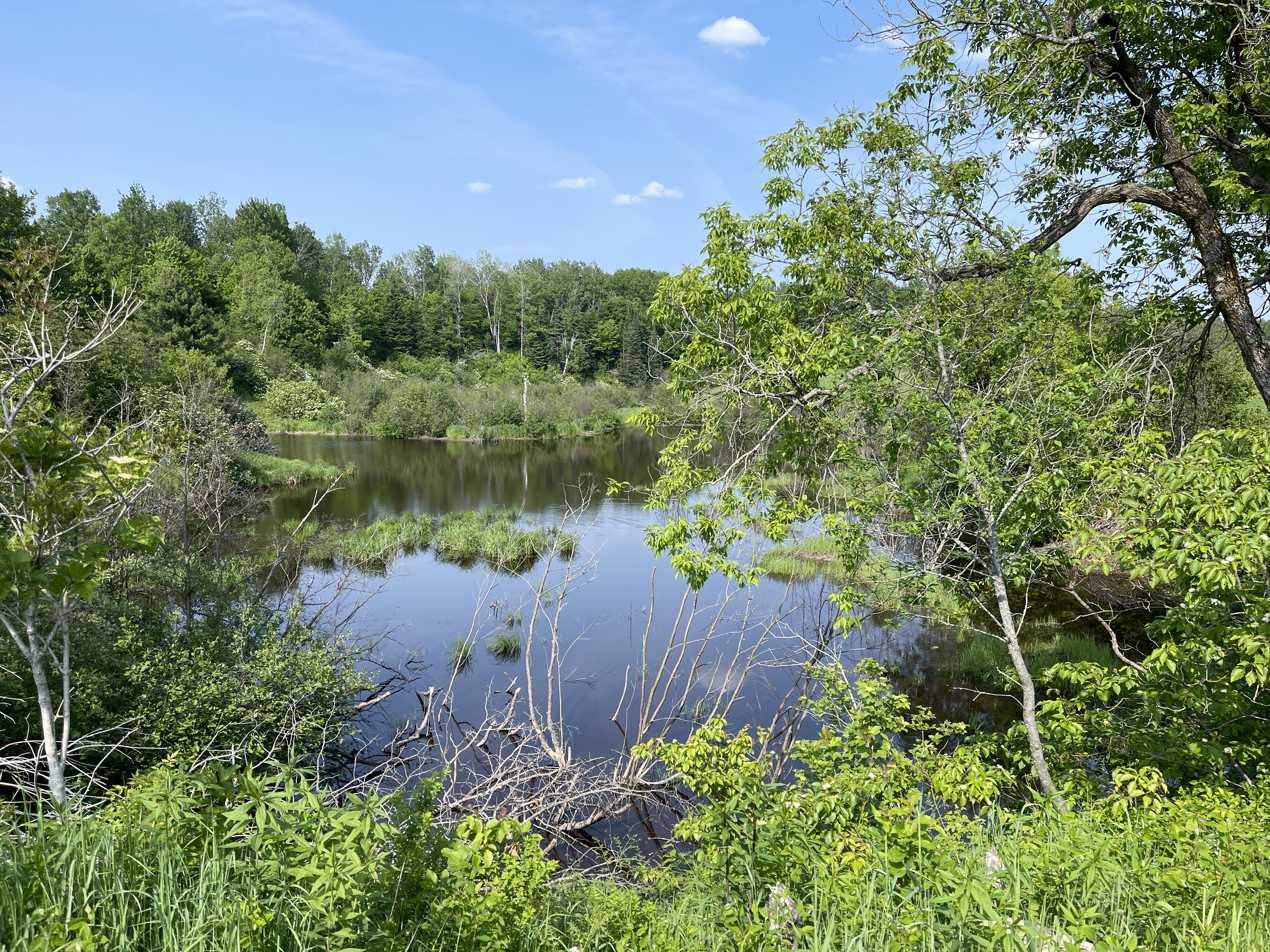
- Batiscan River tributary, Saint-Narcisse

- Rivière des Chutes (Quebec) "Rivière des Chutes", in Saint-Narcisse and Saint-Stanislas, in Batiscanie, in Quebec
- Native name: Rivière des Chutes (French)

Location
- Country: Canada

Physical characteristics
- Source
  - location: Lac Noir (Black Lake) (at the limit of Hérouxville and Saint-Narcisse)
- Mouth
  - location: Saint-Stanislas (Les Chenaux), province (Quebec), Canada
  - coordinates: 46.53°N 72.37472°W
- Length: 20.4 km (12.7 mi)
- Basin size: 76.1 km^{2} (29.4 sq mi)

Basin features
- River system: St. Lawrence River

The Rivière des Chutes (French pronunciation: [ʁivjɛʁ de ʃyt], "River of the Falls") drains mainly the municipality of Saint-Narcisse, and also Saint-Stanislas, at the end of its course. These municipalities are located in the Les Chenaux Regional County Municipality, in the administrative region of Mauricie, in the province of Quebec, Canada.

The Rivière des Chutes flows over 20.4 kilometres (12.7 mi) (including 1.7 km in Saint-Stanislas at the end of it course) and drains a watershed of an area of 76.1 square kilometres (29.4 sq mi) (including watershed Sanschagrin stream, in Saint-Stanislas).

== River path ==
=== Source ===
This river of the Batiscanie rises in "Lac Noir" (Black Lake) (popularly designated "Morin Lake"), located at 1.7 kilometres (1.1 mi) (measured in direct line) to the east of Lac-à-la-Tortue, at the limit of Hérouxville, Quebec (Row X) and Saint-Narcisse (Row "Côte Saint-Pierre Coté Sud" and First row of Radnor). Because of the geographical position of the lake, the "chemin de la Grande ligne" (Great Line road) makes a curve around the lac on the north. Formerly, the discharge from the "Lac Noir" (Black Lake) flows to Ataca Lake (located in Hérouxville, located at 0.8 km lower to the west), which flows to "Lac à la Tortue" (Turtle Lake) where it discharges at the limit of Hérouxville and Lac-à-la-Tortue (a sector of Shawinigan). Following a better irrigation of these wetlands, the "Lac Noir" (Black lake) shrank and instead flows south into the "Rivière des chutes".

Thus, the main source of the "Rivière des Chutes" begins at the edge of the Lordships of Batiscan and Champlain, in a wet area, where it flows southeast for approximately 1.9 kilometres (1.2 mi) (measured in a straight line) in the First row of Radnor. Being sometimes tortuous, the path of this small river roughly follows the "Grande ligne" (Great line) on 3.4 km (measured in a straight line), crossing back and forth this limit eight times between the 1st row of Radnor and Frigon road. To overcome this obstacle (the course of the river), a 2.6 kilometres (1.6 mi) road segment passes about 140 metres (460 ft) south of the "Grande Ligne" (Great Line) in the "First row of the falls" (Premier rang des chutes).

=== Premier rang des chutes (English: First row of the Falls) ===
Then the river veers to the South through the path of the "Grande ligne" (on the 4th lot northwest of Frigon road which is perpendicular to the "Grande ligne") to go running in the "Premier rang des chutes" (First row of the Falls), in the Lordship of Champlain where it crosses 32 lots of land. The river then receives several small tributaries that drain the First and Second row of the Falls. On lot 314 of the "Premier rang des chutes" (First row of the Falls), the river turns East to go back across the "Grande ligne" at lot 295 (Premier rang des chutes) at 1.1 kilometres (0.68 mi) northwest of the church of Saint-Narcisse, returning to flow in the Lordship of Batiscan.

=== Bypassing the village ===
Crossing the "Rang Nord-Ouest de la rivière des chutes" (Northwest row of the "rivière des chutes"), the river bypasses the village of Saint-Narcisse from the north-east. The sawmill and flourmill of Albert Cossette was located in this river segment. From "Grande linge" (Great line), going Eastward to Saint-Stanislas, two roads going along the river falls, are the row North Falls and row South Falls.

=== In the south of the route 352 ===
Then, the river has cut route 352 on lot 81 of the same row. Then, the river turns to the east, in "Rang Est de la rivière des chutes" (row East of the river falls) in parallel to the route 352 where it crosses 11 lots. Finally, the river enters in the territory of Saint-Stanislas in the "rang des Chutes Sud-Est" (row of the falls - South-East) where it crosses six lots pointing to his mouth. The segment of the river located to the south of the route 352 runs in parallel (North side) to the Saint-Narcisse's moraine.

=== Mouth ===
The "Rivière des Chutes" flows mainly in agricultural zone, sometimes marking several small coils, passing through some forested areas (especially early in it course and at the end). It empties into the Batiscan River at the foot of the "Chutes des Ailes" (falls to the wings), and in front of the "Iles des Ailes" (Islands in the Wings). Behind these islands are the "chutes aux Ilets" (falls to Islets) (east side of the Batiscan River). The mouth of the "rivière des chutes" is located at 1.7 kilometres (1.1 mi) (measured in direct line) upstream of the dam of Saint-Narcisse and 1.2 kilometres (0.75 mi) (in direct line) below the Murphy falls.

Rivière des Chutes, Saint-Narcisse

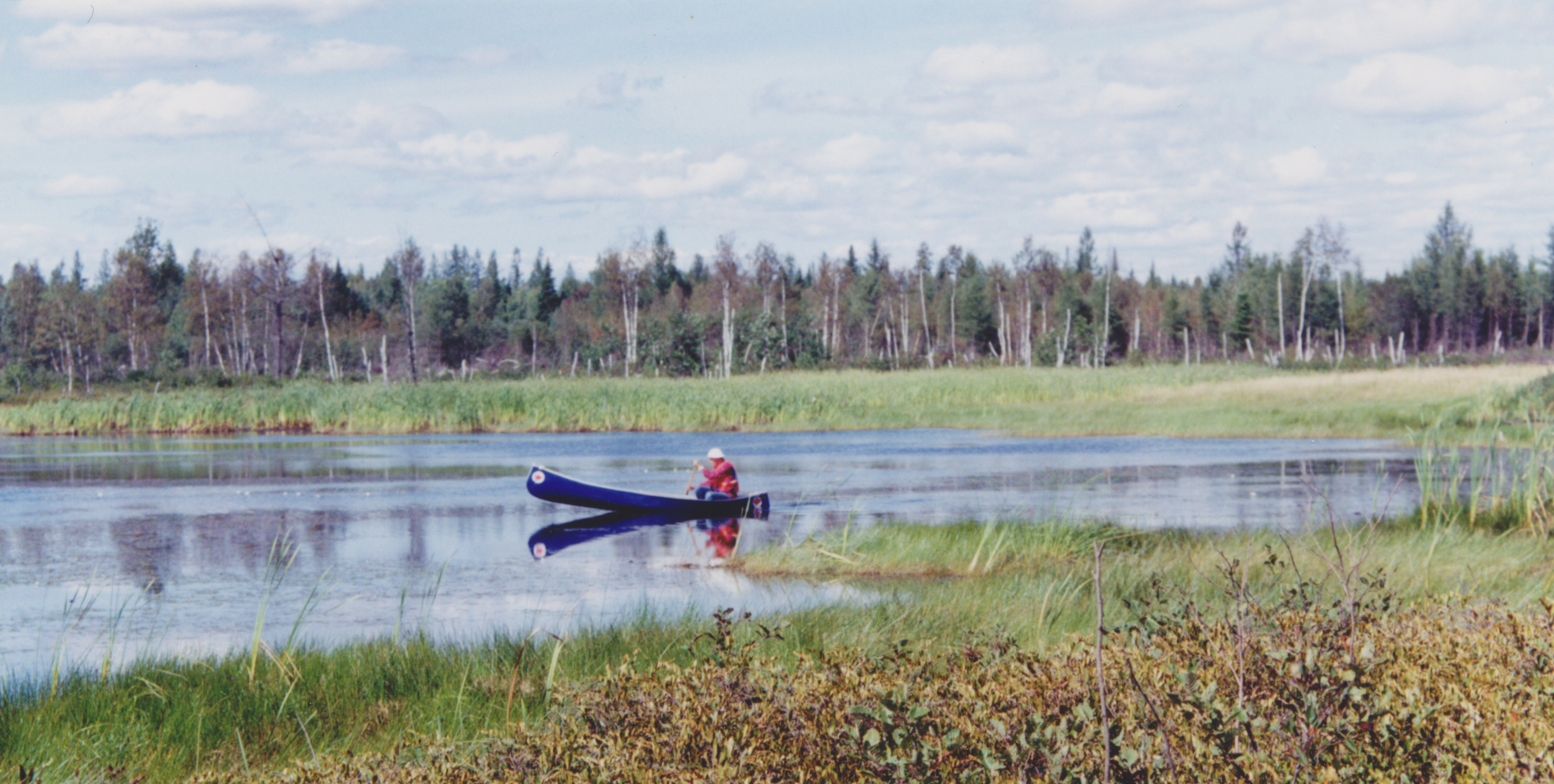
Lac Noir, river's source in Lac-à-la-Tortue bog

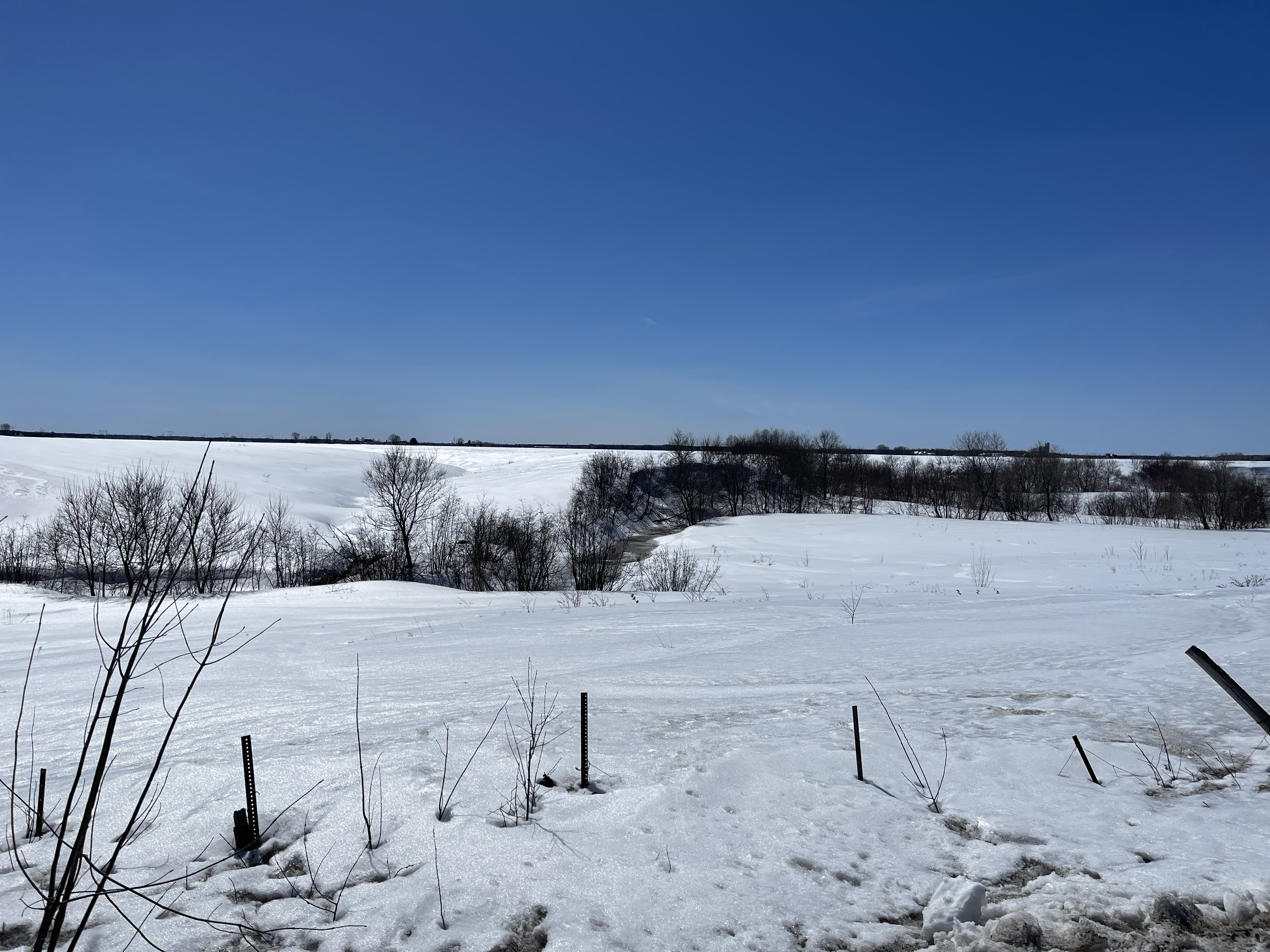
Church Street

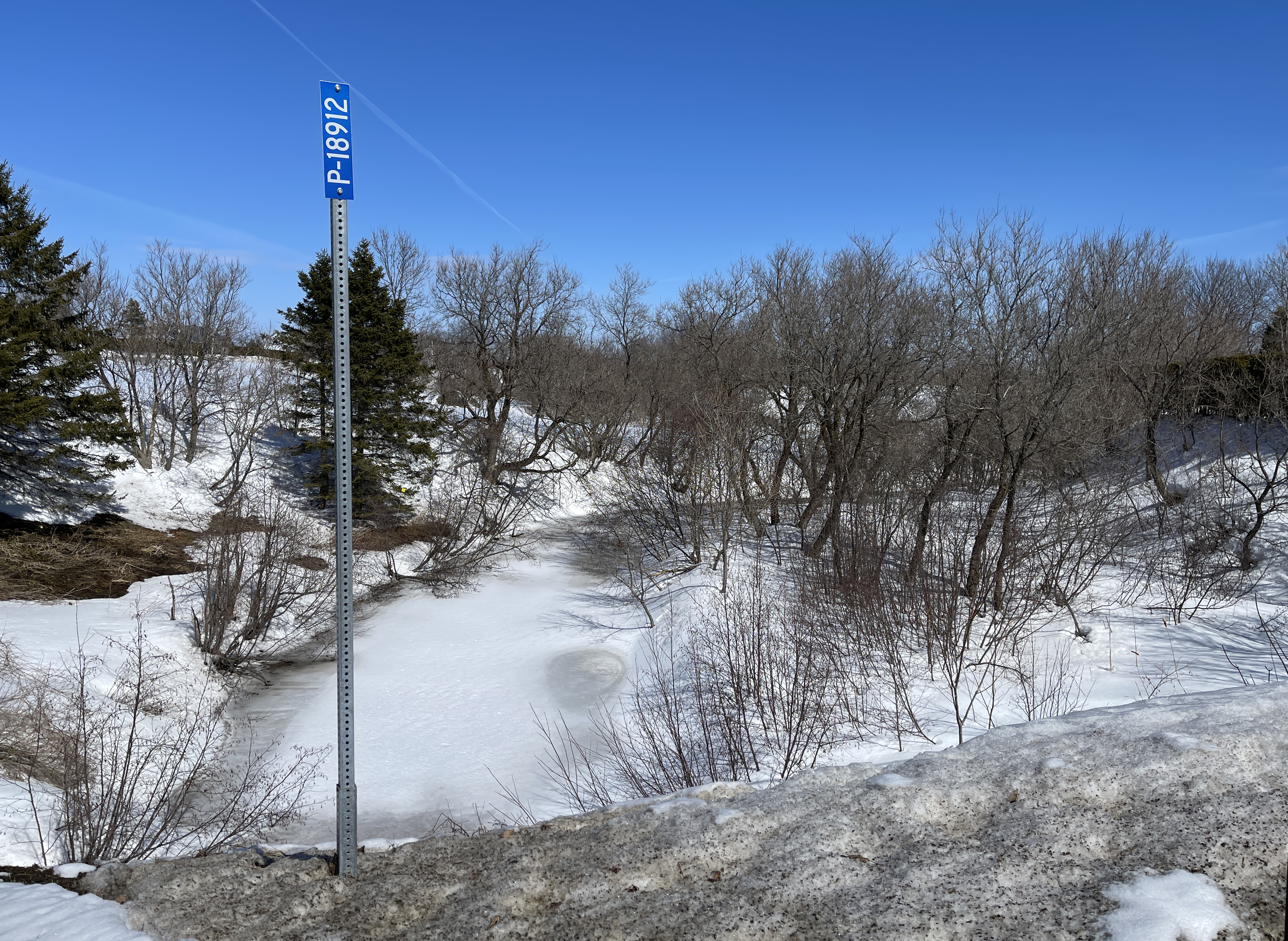
Church Street

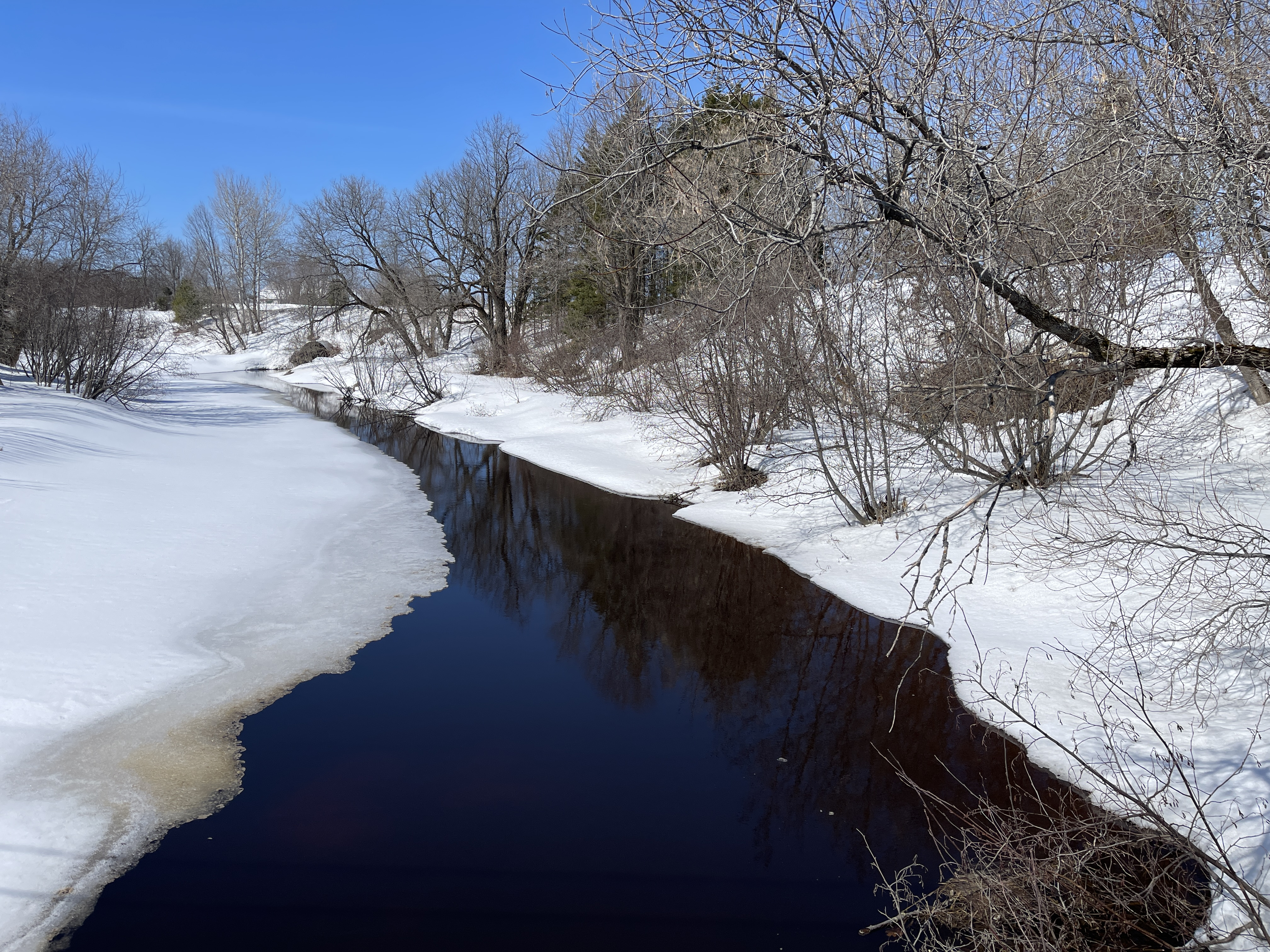
Route du Moulin

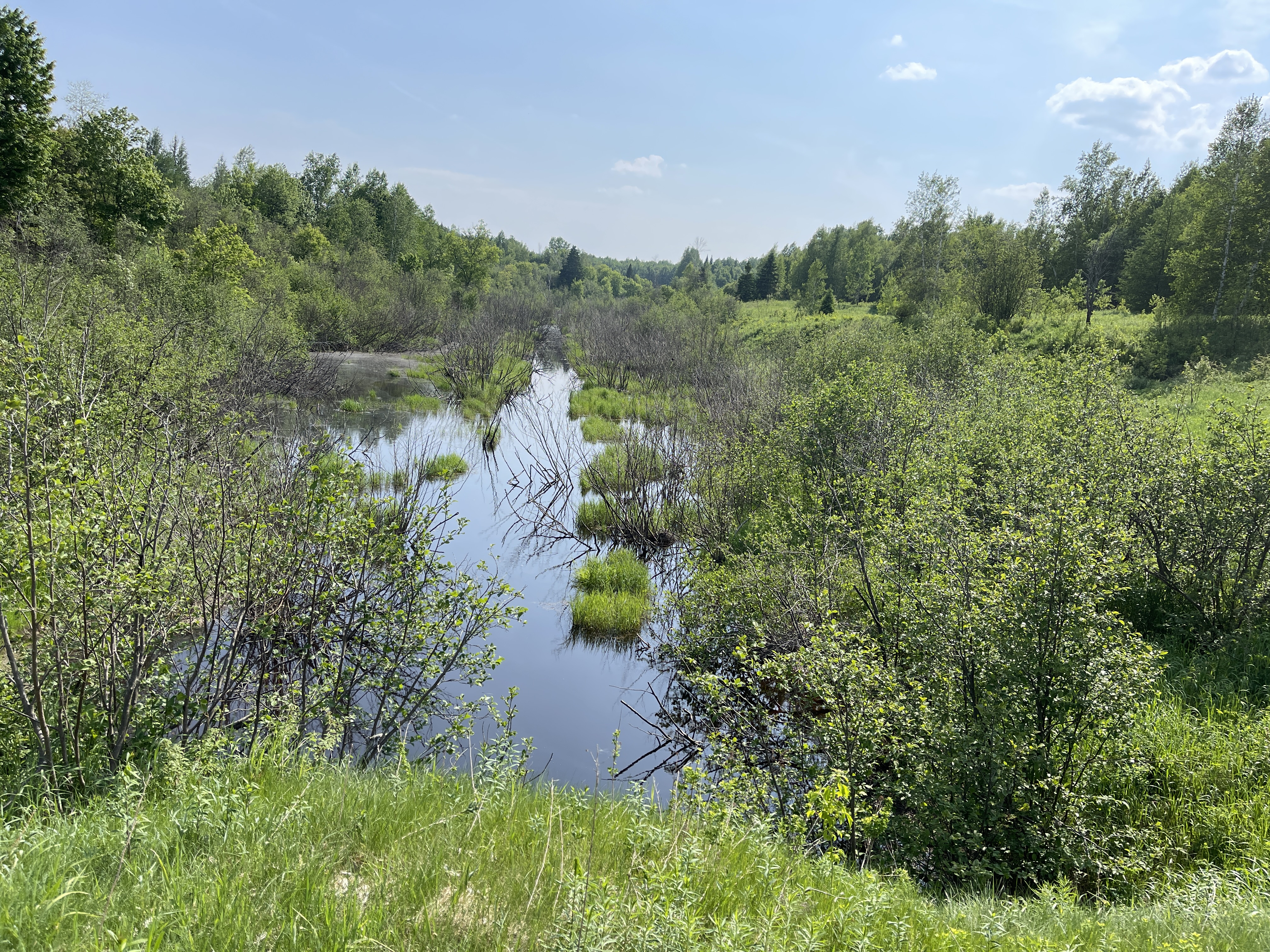
Rang du Haut-de-la-Grande-Ligne

=== Sanschagrin stream ===
The main tributary of "Rivière des Chutes" is Sanschagrin stream flowing south into the territory of Saint-Stanislas over a length of 3.3 km. This creek drains a watershed covering an area of 9.4 km². The mouth of the creek Sanchangrin (coordinates: 46.574443, -72.429999) which flows into the "Rivière des Chutes" is located at:

- just south of route 352 between Saint-Stanislas to Saint-Narcisse,
- 0.7 km (in direct line) west of the mouth of the "rivière des chutes", and
- 3.3 km (in direct line) on the East of the church of Saint-Narcisse.

From "Grande Ligne" (Great line), going Eastward to Saint-Stanislas, two roads are along the "rivière des Chutes", the row North and row of Falls South.

In Saint-Narcisse, "Rivière des Chutes" has always been a barrier to the transport of the first settlers, particularly if they wanted to reach the row Saint-Pierre (northern part of the municipality). Except during frost season, settlers had to make a detour by using the bridge of "Rivière des chutes" on "Haute Grande-Ligne" (Upper Great Line), then follow the road of the "Rivière des Chutes North", to reach the row Saint-Pierre.

== History ==
The basin of the "Rivière des chutes" began to be colonized in the late eighteenth century. The pioneers were heading north, crossing the moraine of Saint-Narcisse, to settle on new plots of land because there was little available lots remaining in the valley of the Saint Lawrence River (in Champlain and Sainte-Geneviève-de-Batiscan) at the foot of the moraine of Saint-Narcisse.

The sawmill Albert Cossette, powered by water flow, was erected in the North of the Falls River Falls. The dammed water was repressed by the mill up to the "Grande ligne" (Great Line). While the flour mill was located at the rear of sawmill.

== Toponymy ==
The French name "Rivière des Chutes" ("River of Falls") comes from the fact that the river flows into the Batiscan River (West side) at the foot of the "Chutes de l'Aile" (Fall of the wings). The mouth of the "Rivière des Chutes" is located in an area of a series of waterfalls downstream: Chute à Jimmy (Jimmy falls), Chute des Ailes (Wings falls) and Chute à Murphy (Murphy falls). This way of naming "Rivière des Chutes" help for pinpointing places for people traveling on the Batiscan River. In this area, travelers canoeing the river should make a long portage in order to bypass a series of falls.

The name "Rivière des chutes" (English: River of the Falls) was formalized as of December 5, 1968 in the register of place names at the Commission de toponymie du Québec (Geographical Names Board of Quebec).

== See also ==
- Lordship of Batiscan
- Sainte-Genevieve-de-Batiscan
- Saint-Narcisse
- Saint-Stanislas
- Batiscanie
- Batiscan River
- Les Chenaux Regional County Municipality
- List of rivers of Quebec
