= Saint-Séverin, Mauricie =

Saint-Séverin
- Parish municipality
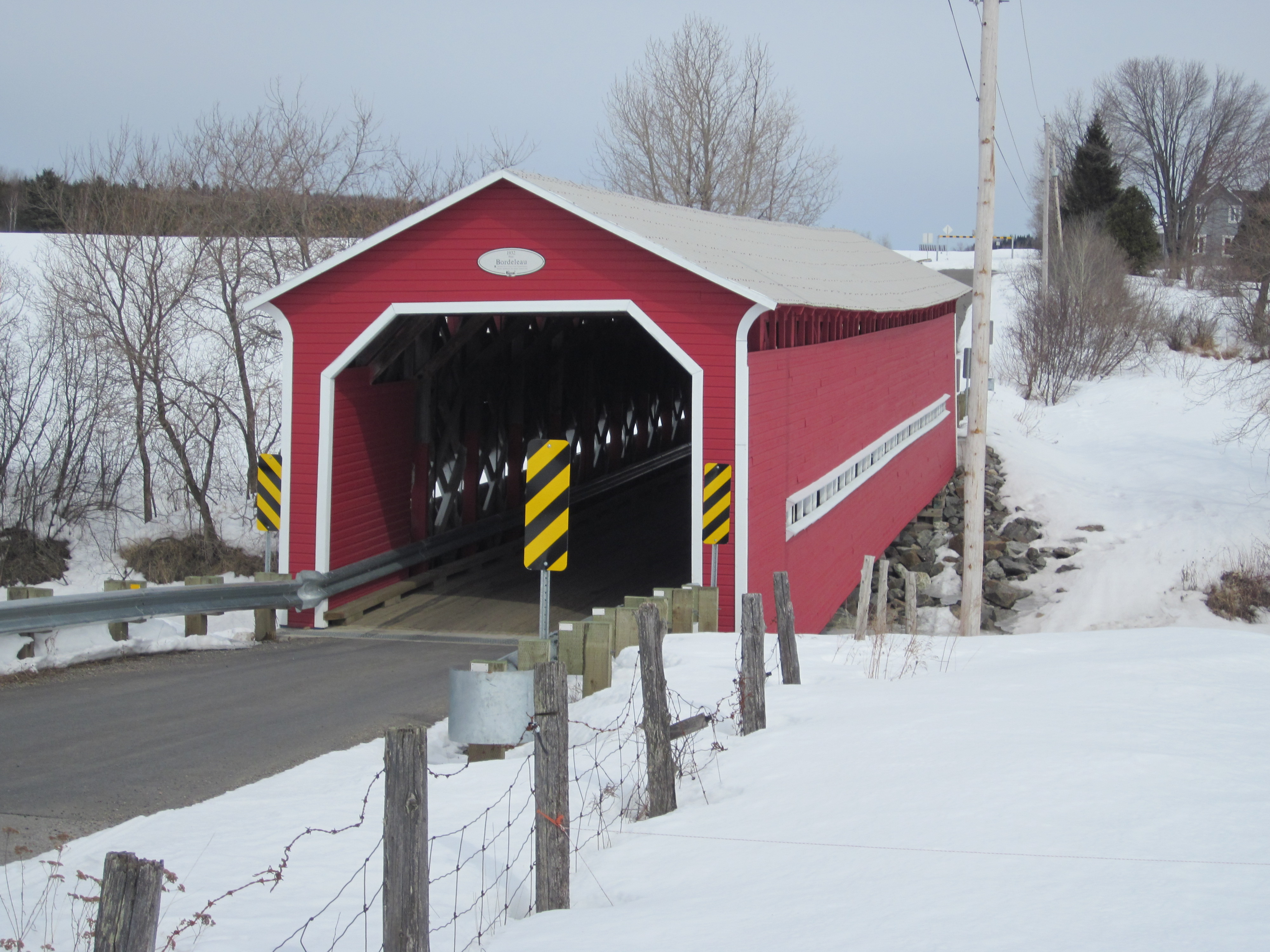
- Bordeleau covered bridge, Bordeleau road

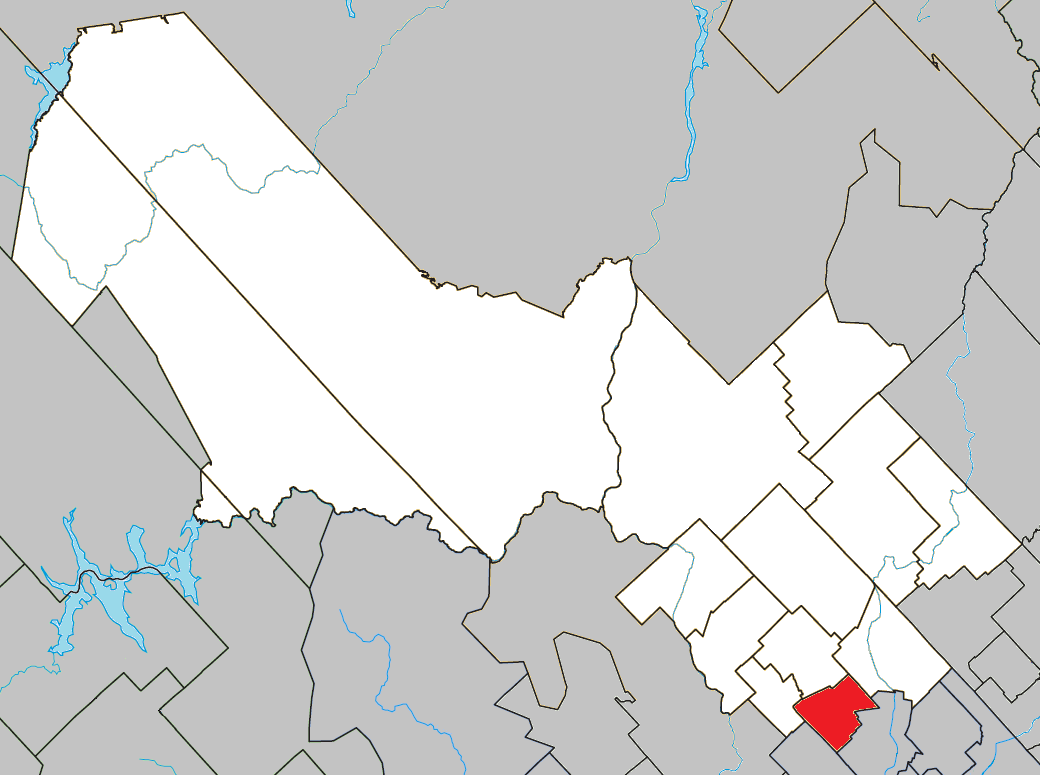
- Location within Mékinac RCM

- Location in central Quebec
- Coordinates: 46°40′N 72°30′W
- Country: Canada
- Province: Quebec
- Region: Mauricie
- RCM: Mékinac
- Constituted: April 11, 1890

Government
  - Mayor: Gérard Vandal
  - Fed. riding: Saint-Maurice—Champlain
  - Prov. riding: Champlain

Area
  - Total: 62.36 km^{2} (24.08 sq mi)
  - Land: 61.65 km^{2} (23.80 sq mi)

Population (2021)
  - Total: 812
  - Density: 13.2/km^{2} (34/sq mi)
  - Change 2016-21: ▼4.0%
  - Dwellings: 396
- Time zone: UTC−5 (EST)
  - Summer (DST): UTC−4 (EDT)
- Postal code(s): G0X 2B0
- Area codes: 418 and 581
- Highways: R-159
- Website: www.st-severin.ca

Saint-Séverin (French pronunciation: [sɛ̃ sevʁɛ̃]; also called St-Séverin-de-Proulxville or simply Proulxville) is a parish municipality in Quebec (Canada) in the Mékinac Regional County Municipality, Quebec, in the administrative region of Mauricie and watershed the Batiscanie. At various times, the place was also known as Saint-Séverin-de-Proulxville and Proulxville.

Historically its economy was based mainly on agriculture. Until the mid-20th century, farmers were actively involved in the supply of lumber camps of the Middle and Upper Mauricie, providing men, horses, carriages, meat, flour, fodder, household items ... Two flour mills with a regional upstream of the village contributed significantly to the regional economy.

The town of Saint-Séverin is named in honour of the vicar-general Louis Séverin Rheault and abbot Séverin of Saint-Maurice-en-Valais. Proulxville name is in memory of Father Prudent Proulx (1853-1924), the first parish priest (1889-1918).

== History ==
Parish and church

The parish of Saint-Séverin was founded in 1889 by detachment of the parishes of Saint-Tite and Saint-Stanislas. The first resident priest arrived that year. The land for the construction of the church and rectory was purchased the following year. The parishioners first built a temporary chapel (which was later transformed into a barn) as well as the current presbytery.
The current church of Saint-Séverin was built in 1895-1897 by the parishioners. Georges Baribeau, from Saint-Anne-de-la-Pérade, was responsible for the construction of the presbytery. Architect and contractor Alfred Giroux of Saint-Casimir was involved in the construction. The stone of the church is quarried in Saint-Séverin. The church is connected to the community hall built in 1948. It was decided to build a stone mass grave near the church in 1910.

Source: Répertoire du patrimoine culturel du Québec

According to the conventions of the time, the canonical erection of the parish preceded the civil erection. Prior to 1889, the territory was inhabited and experienced intensive clearing. The Pioneers enjoyed the services of religion at the village of Saint-Stanislas or Saint-Tite. The remoteness of the pioneers made it difficult to practice faith and access to shops and public services in Saint-Tite or Saint-Stanislas. In winter, the pioneers used the ice road over the River des Envies; in other seasons, the roads were bad, especially because of the rain, spring floods and culverts improvised in fund flows. By 1873, the sector's pioneers have made several representations to the Bishop of Trois-Rivières requesting their own parish.

Note that the hamlet Cossetteville (located at the southern end of the Grand Rang Saint-Tite) grew and was popularly regarded as a potential site for a new village for the sector. Religious authorities of the diocese of Trois-Rivières took into consideration the distance between Saint-Stanislas, Saint-Narcisse and Saint-Tite, to facilitate access to the religion.

- September 1889 - Canonical erection of the parish of Saint-Severin, whose territory is detached from the religious parishes of Saint-Tite and Saint-Stanislas, under the jurisdiction of Bishop F.X. Laflèche, Bishop of Trois-Rivières. The new parish was named "Saint-Séverin" in recognition of the canon Louis Severin Rheault, which proposed the limits and scope of the municipality. It also set the site to the location of the new church.
- December 1889 - Arrival of the first priest, Father Proulx. For its first winter, it hosts to M. Alphonse Lanouette's house. His early masses were held in a private home of Mr. Rémi Goulet.
- April 1890 - Erection of the parish of Saint-Séverin. Ovide Goulet became mayor. The first municipal council meetings were held at the flour mill Alphonse Lanouette or at his home. Then the new board began the construction and improvement of roads and bridges.
- 1890 - Construction of a sudden chores a little chapel and rectory today.
- 1897 - Opening of the new church which was built at a cost of $17,000. This debt was paid by parishioners in less than 15 years.
- 1912 - Implementation of the Caisse populaire (the 44th of Desjardins Group), with the involvement of the vicar, Father Lessard. Initially, the first deposits and withdrawals were traded in a local of the presbytery.

== Geography ==
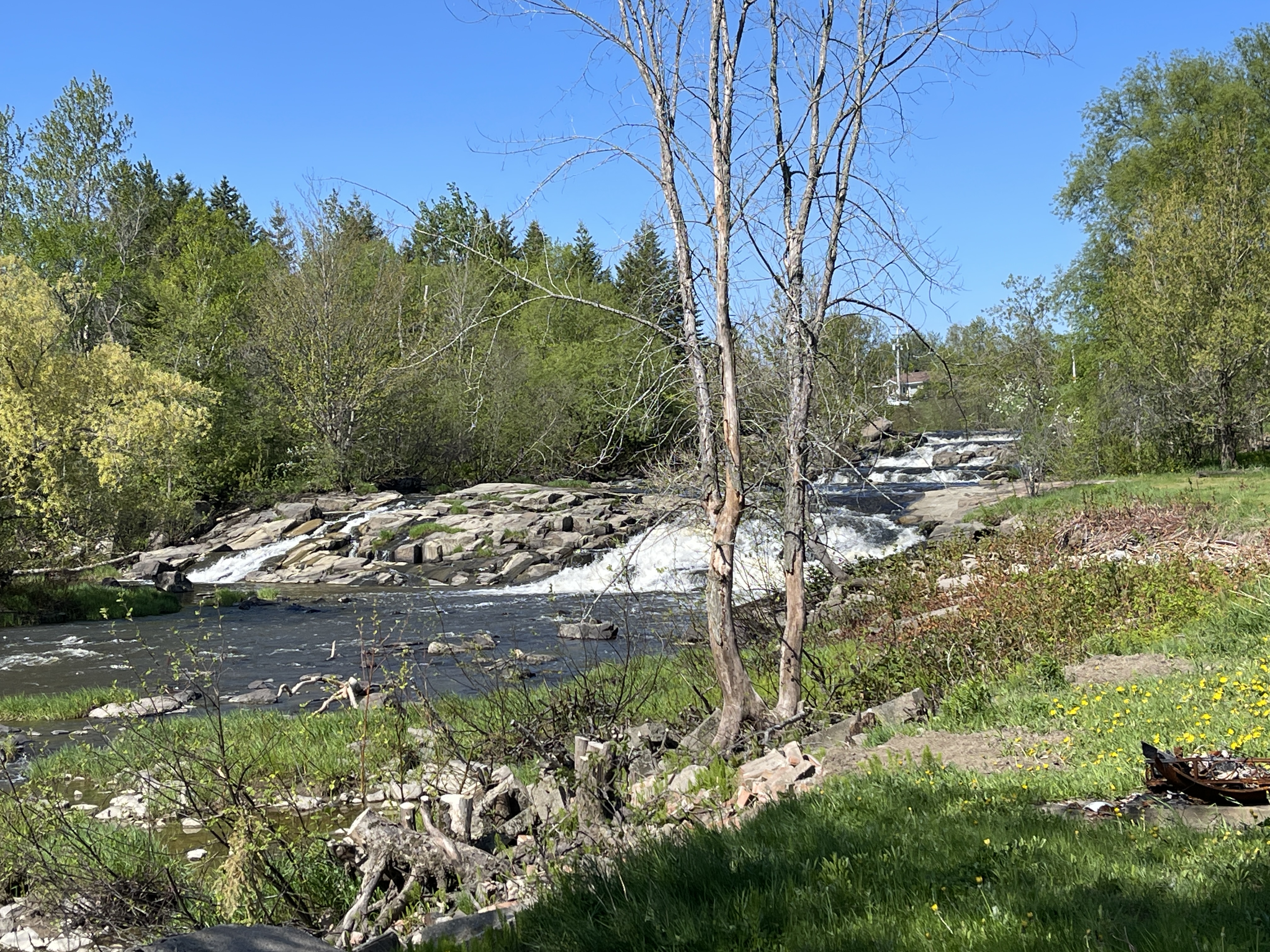
Chemin des Moulins

The main street of Saint-Séverin is called "Boulevard Saint-Louis", which is the continuation of the path "Côte Saint-Louis" which crosses the municipality in a straight line from north to south, from the "Rivière des Envies". The way "Côte Saint-Louis" ends at the intersection of Route 352 in Saint-Stanislas, about 800 meters south of the discharge of "rivière des Envies". [[Fichier:Bordeleau bridge on Rivière-des-Envies.JPG|thumb|left|Bordeleau bridge, Saint-Séverin (Mékinac), Quebec.]] Covered Bridge (formerly named "Bordeleau Bridge") spans the "Rivière des Envies", at the boundary of Saint-Tite, Hérouxville and Saint-Séverin. The first bridge was built in 1875 and was rebuilt in 1932 with a roof. This bridge is located on the Dessureault road connecting to the Grand Rang Saint-Tite (in the hamlet of Cossetteville).

The municipality of Saint-Séverin of Proulxville is surrounded by Saint-Tite (North West), Saint-Adelphe (northeast), Saint-Stanislas (southeast), Saint-Narcisse (south) and Hérouxville (west). The distance between the church of Saint-Séverin and the surrounding parishes are: Saint-Narcisse (17.3 km path through the Côte Saint-Paul, and road of row Saint-Pierre), Saint-Stanislas (12.7 km via the Saint-Louis road), Saint-Adelphe (16.8 km via the St-Émile road) and Saint-Tite (9 km through Grand Rang road).

"Rivière des Envies" and its tributary the "Rivière à la tortue" (Turtle River) are the two significant rivers that have marked the geography of the "Saint-Séverin" parish.

== Demography ==
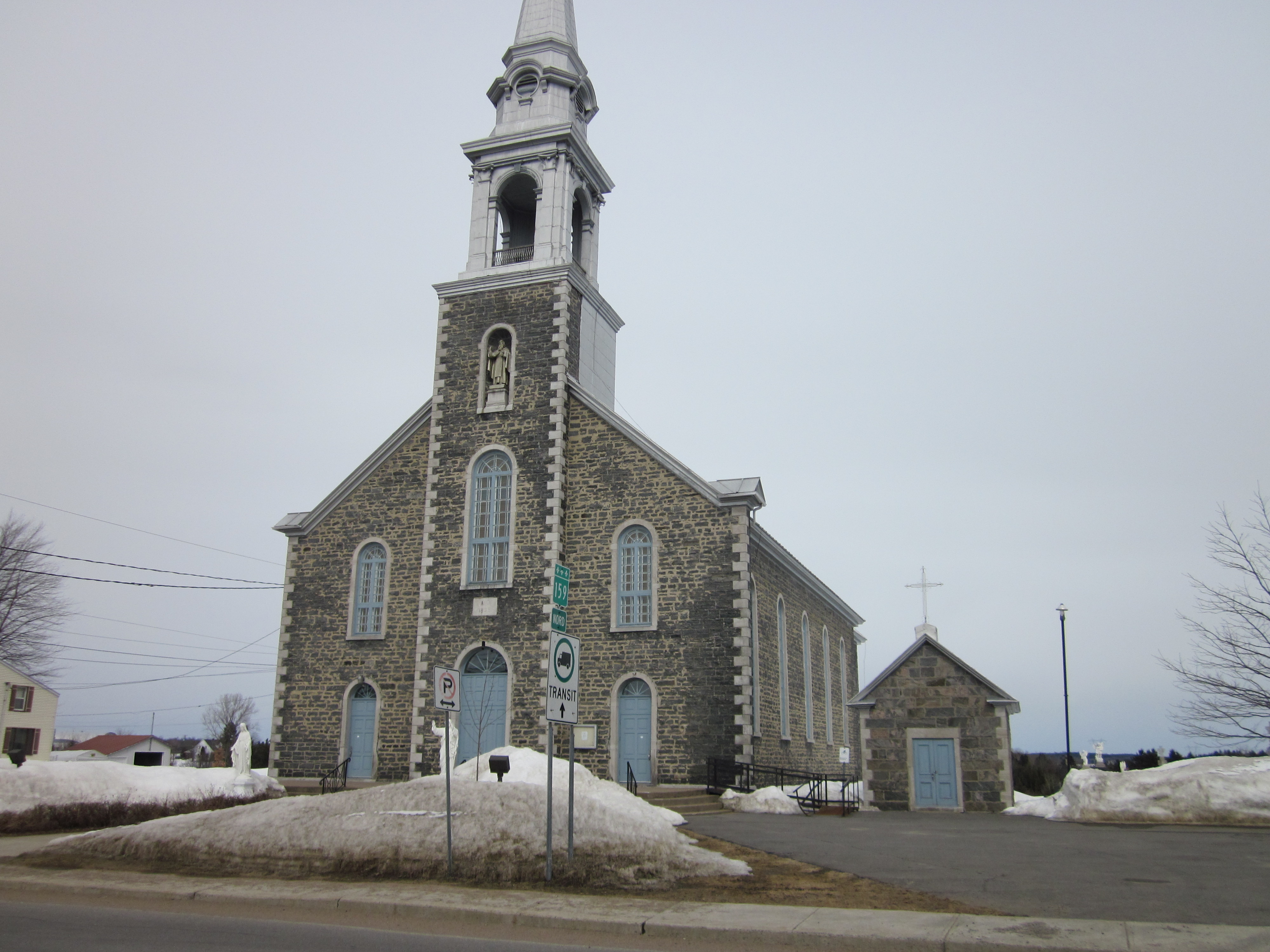
Saint-Séverin parrish church

In the 2021 Census of Population conducted by Statistics Canada, Saint-Séverin had a population of 812 living in 365 of its 396 total private dwellings, a change of −4% from its 2016 population of 846. With a land area of 61.65 km^{2} (23.80 sq mi), it had a population density of 13.2/km^{2} (34.1/sq mi) in 2021.

Historical census populations – Saint-Séverin, Mauricie

Year	Pop.	±%
1891	1,068	—
1901	1,183	+10.8%
1911	1,363	+15.2%
1921	1,290	−5.4%
1931	1,397	+8.3%
1941	1,667	+19.3%
1951	1,671	+0.2%

Year	Pop.	±%
1956	1,739	+4.1%
1961	1,622	−6.7%
1966	1,368	−15.7%
1971	1,199	−12.4%
1976	1,103	−8.0%
1981	1,067	−3.3%
1986	1,028	−3.7%

Year	Pop.	±%
1991	967	−5.9%
1996	976	+0.9%
2001	925	−5.2%
2006	859	−7.1%
2011	860	+0.1%
2016	846	−1.6%
2021	812	−4.0%

Population counts are not adjusted for boundary changes.
Source: Statistics Canada

Mother tongue (2021):

- English as first language: 0.6%
- French as first language: 97.5%
- English and French as first languages: 0%
- Other as first language: 1.3%

== Infrastructure ==
A railroad section was built to link Saint-Stanislas and Hérouxville. This railroad section started at the Transcontinental stood (east side of Batiscan River) in front of the village of Saint-Stanislas, crossed the river on an iron bridge (located upstream of the village), then roamed the southern part of the municipality of Saint-Séverin, and reached the discharge of Lac-à-la-Tortue (located in Hérouxville). There, the railroad did a big curve of around 90 degrees (in north-west direction) in order to follow the path of chemin de la Grande Ligne (Great line). Finally this railroad section joined (about 1 km west of the village of Hérouxville) the railway line connecting the junction Garneau to Hervey-Junction.

The railway station of Saint-Séverin was located on the "road of Cote Saint-Paul," about 300 metres from the intersection of Côte Saint-Paul. The distance by road between the church of Saint-Severin and its station was about 4.1 km.

=== Rivière des Envies ===
Coming from the north-west (Saint-Tite), the "Rivière des Envies" makes a long curve before empties in the fall at the former two mills: sawmill and floormill. Then, the river goes to the village of Saint-Séverin, pass a big drop at the downstream end of the village. The river continues its course and pass under the bridge path Trefflé Veillette, then crosses the municipality of Saint-Stanislas to pour into "Batiscan River" at the southern boundary of the village. At the height of Proulxville, "Rivière des Envies" is bordered by a road on each side: the path of the Rivière des Envies North East and Rivière des Envies Southeast. In winter, the "Rivière des Envies" ice road connected Saint-Stanislas and Saint-Tite. This iced road was used with heavily loaded sleighs in the intention to avoid the calvettes on parallel roads and slopes, which were complicated to cross.

=== Rivière à la Tortue (Turtle River) ===
Rivière à la Tortue (Turtle river) begins at the outlet of lac-à-la-Tortue (Turtle Lake) (Hérouxville sector), runs north-east crossing the "Chemin de la Grande Ligne" (Great line road) and "Chemin (road) Saint-Pierre". Then, Turtle River makes a curve to the right to browse the municipality of Saint-Sévérin de Proulxville, more or less in parallel to the "Rivière des Envies". Turtle River cuts the path of Côte Saint-Paul road about 3.2 km southeast of the intersection of the road of the Côte Saint-Louis. Then the river cuts the Saint-Louis Road about 0.6 miles from the intersection of Route 159. Then the river goes to Saint-Stanislas, where it empties into the Rivière des Envies, near the bridge of Route 159.

== See also ==
- Batiscanie, Quebec
