= Quebec Route 159 =

Highway in Quebec, Canada

Route 159

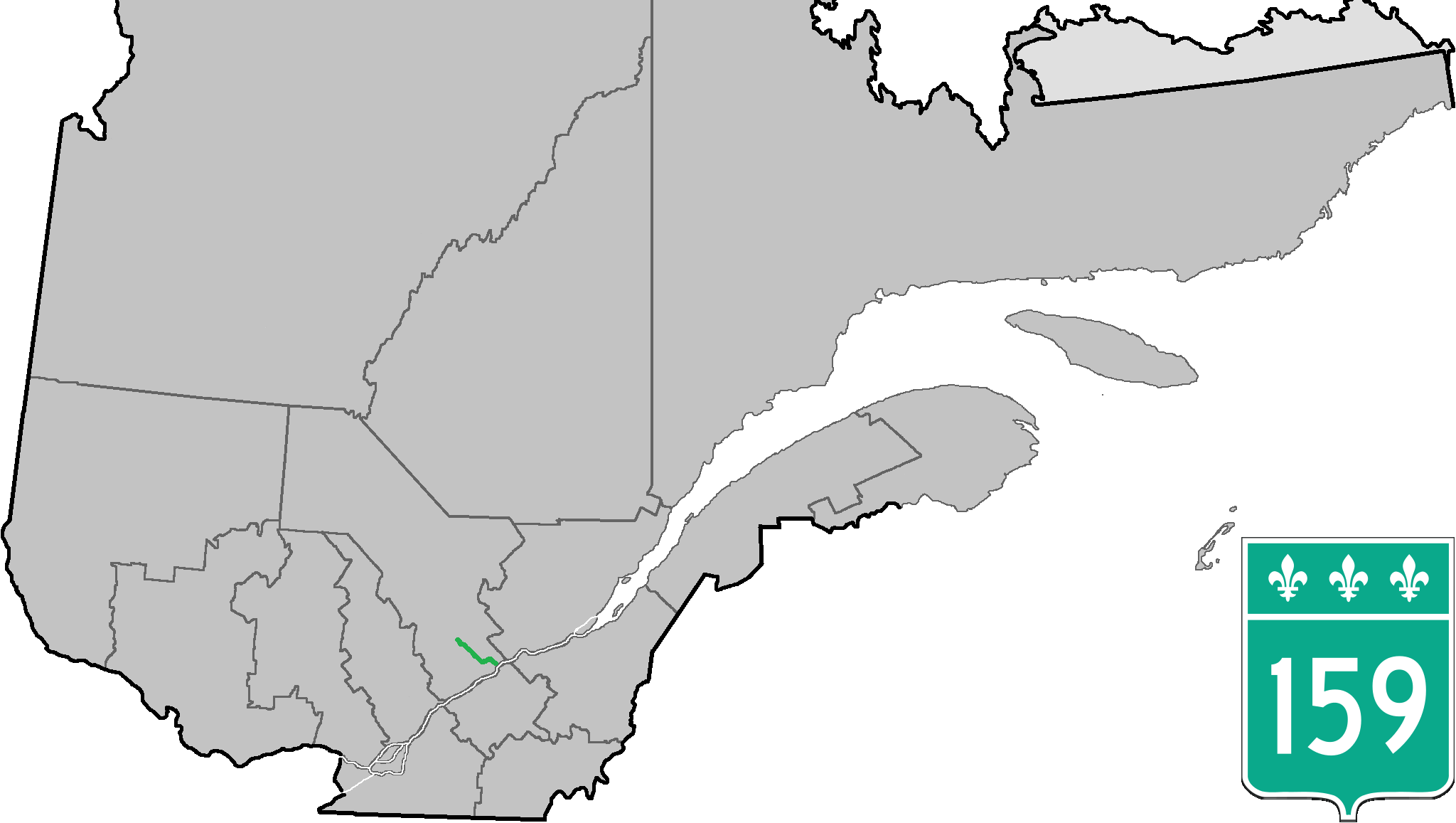

Route information
- Maintained by Transports Québec
- Length: 61.3 km (38.1 mi)

Major junctions
- South end: R-138 in Sainte-Anne-de-la-Pérade
- A-40 in Sainte-Anne-de-la-Pérade; R-153 in Saint-Tite
- North end: R-155 in Saint-Roch-de-Mékinac

Location
- Country: Canada
- Province: Quebec
- Major cities: Saint-Tite, Sainte-Anne-de-la-Pérade, Saint-Stanislas

Highway system
- Quebec provincial highways; Autoroutes; List; Former
← R-158	→ R-161

Provincial Highway 159 (or Route 159) is a two-lane highway on the north shore of the Saint Lawrence River in Quebec, Canada. Its northern terminus is in Saint-Roch-de-Mékinac at the junction of Route 155, and the southern terminus is at the junction of Route 138 in Sainte-Anne-de-la-Pérade.

== Municipalities along Route 159 ==
- Sainte-Anne-de-la-Pérade
- Saint-Prosper-de-Champlain
- Saint-Stanislas
- Saint-Séverin
- Saint-Tite
- Grandes-Piles
- Saint-Roch-de-Mékinac

== Photos ==
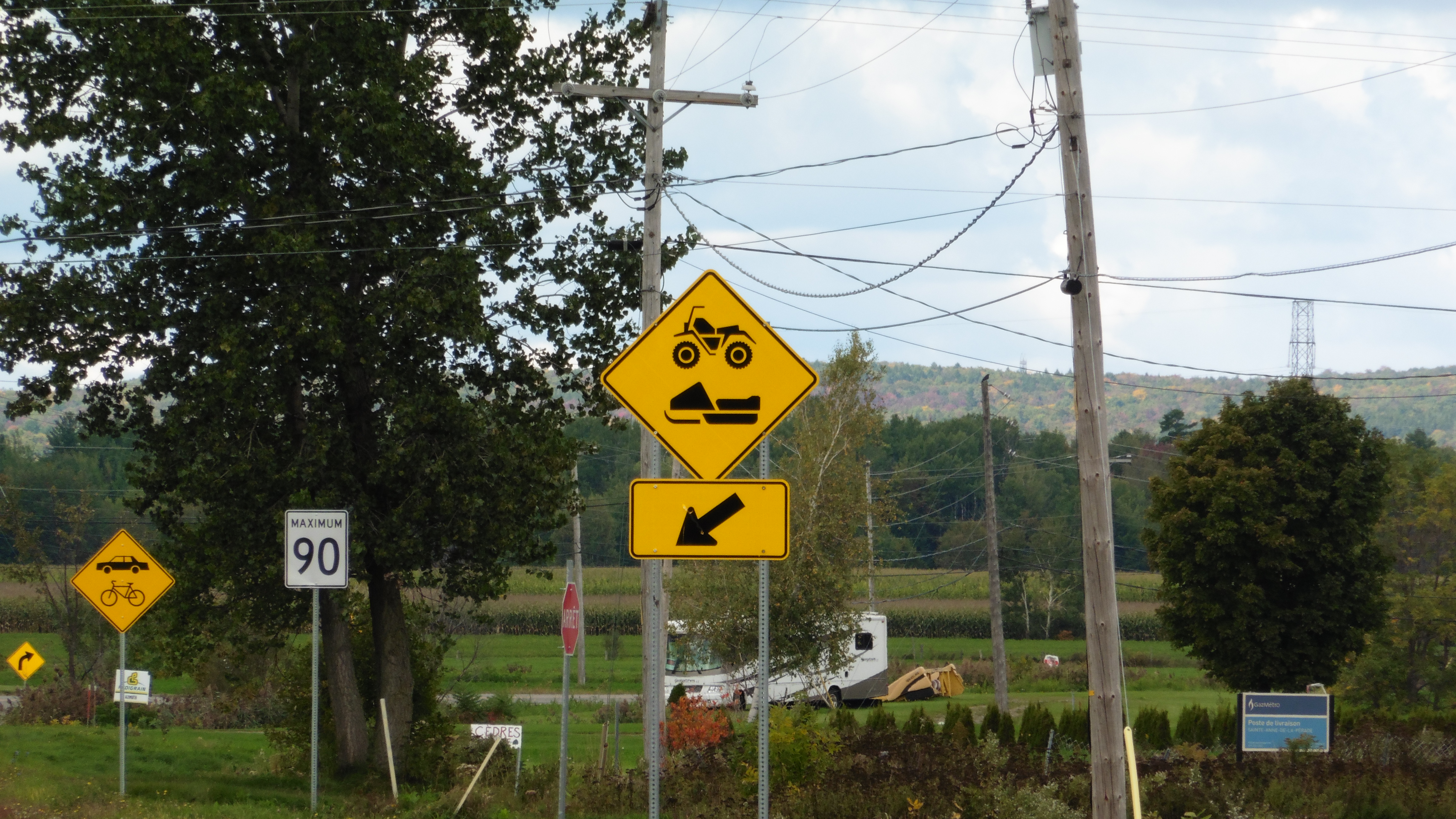
Road signs close to Sainte-Anne-de-la-Pérade

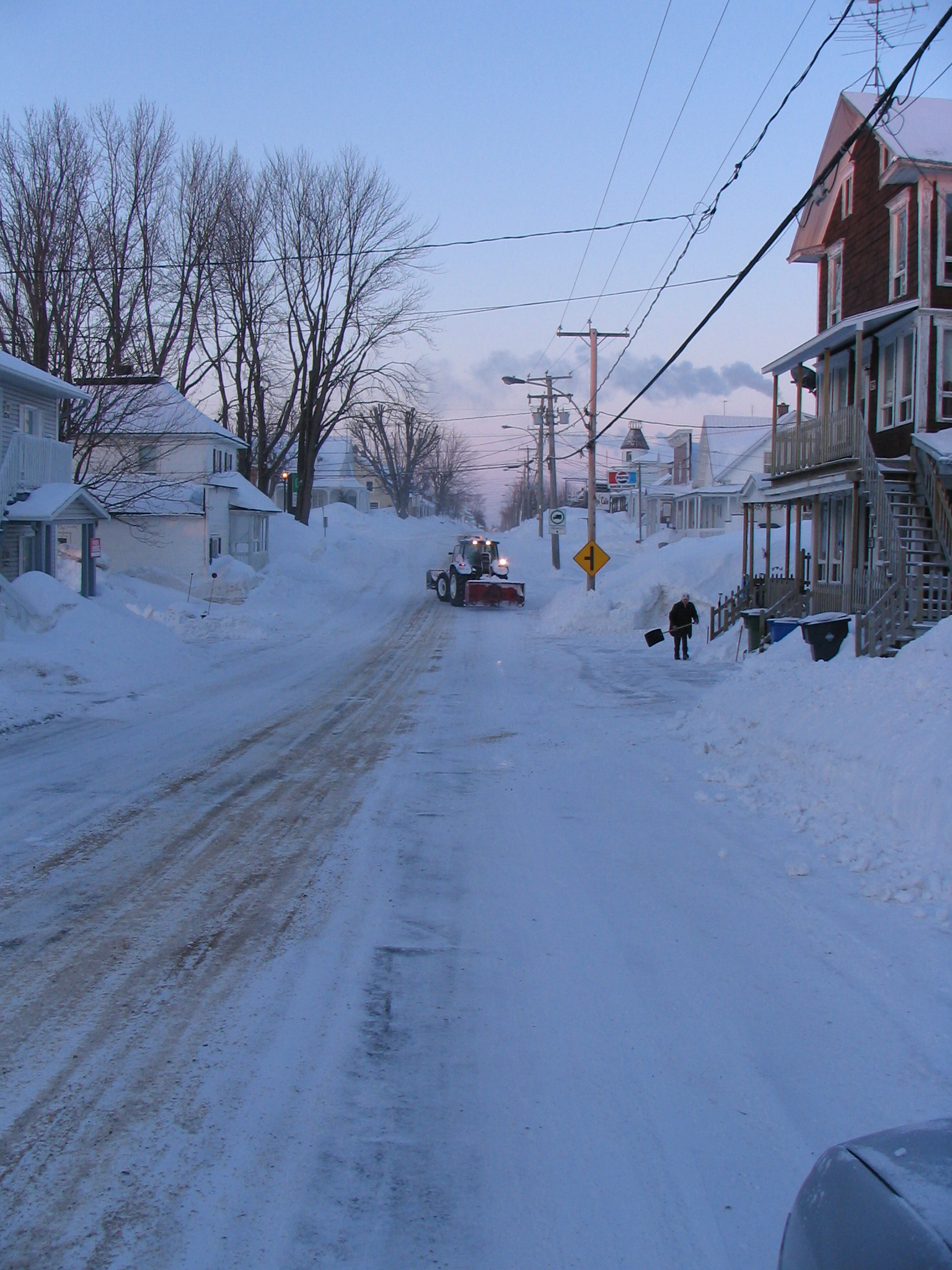
Rue Principale (route 159), Saint-Prosper
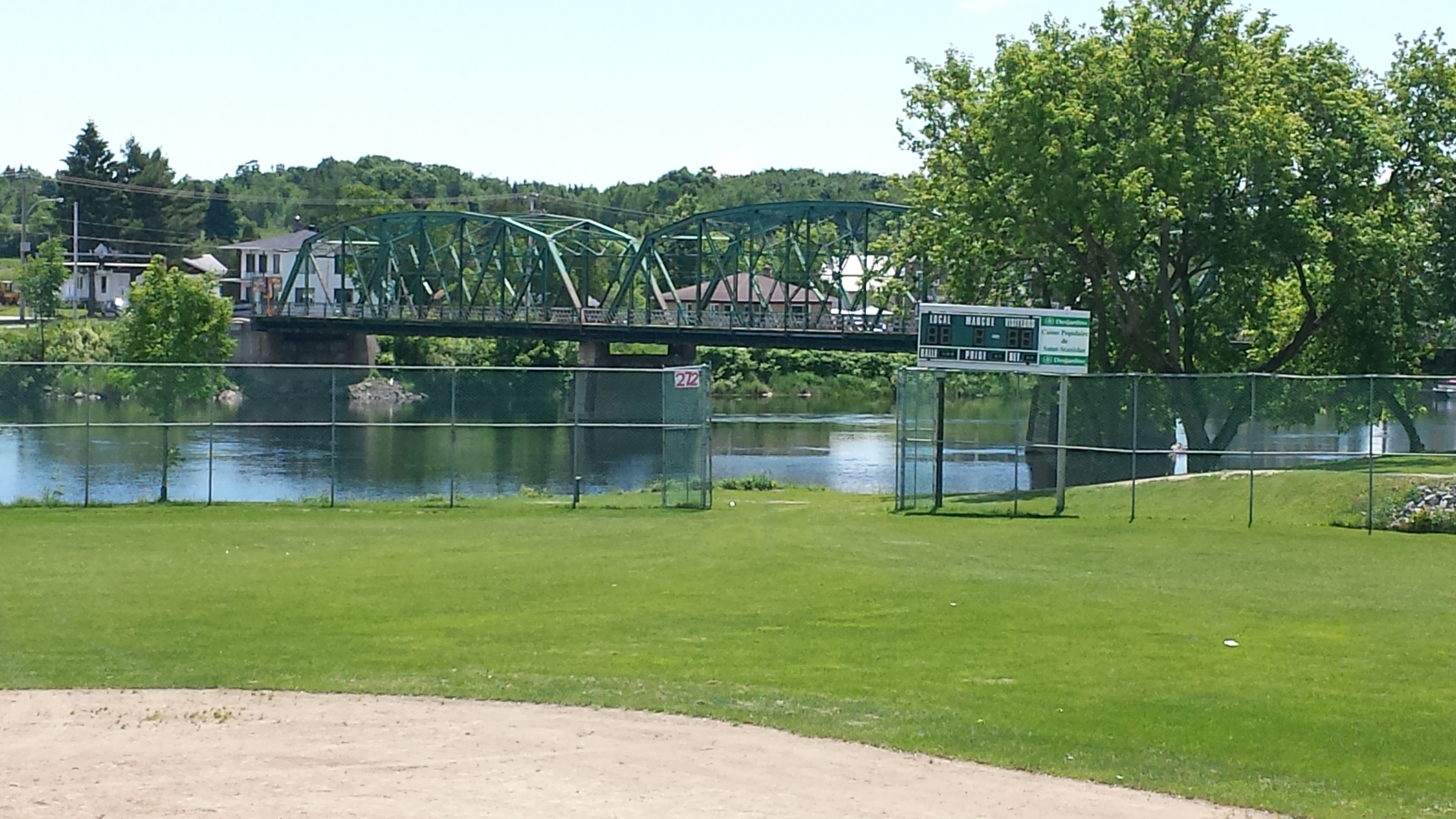
Bridge on Batiscan River, Saint-Stanislas

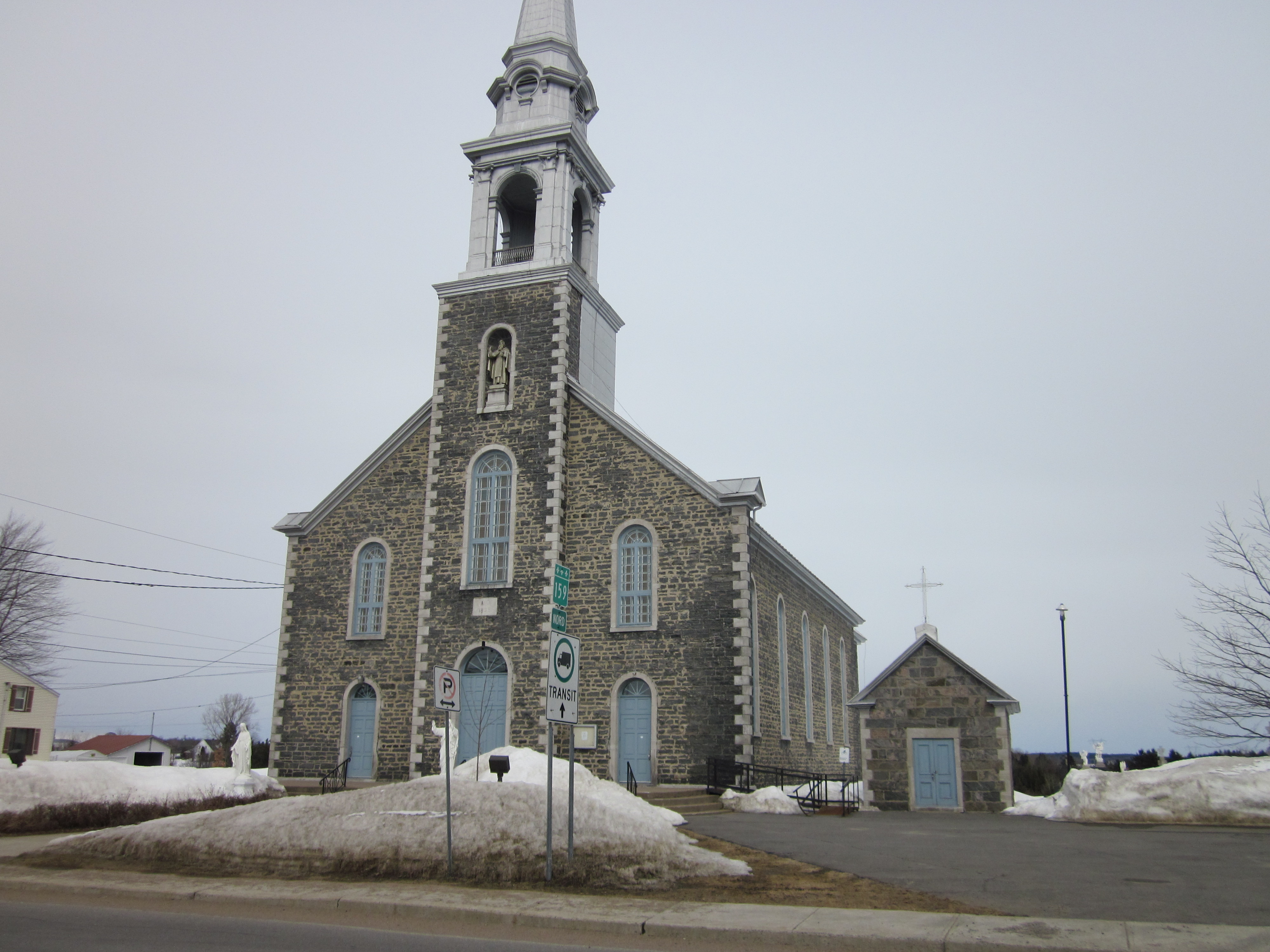
Bld. Saint-Louis (route 159), Parish church, Saint-Séverin

== Major intersections ==
RCM or ET	Municipality	Km	Junction	Notes
Southern terminus of Route 159
Les Chenaux	Sainte-Anne-de-la-Pérade	0.0	R-138	138 WEST: to Batiscan; 138 EAST: to Deschambault-Grondines
Les Chenaux	Sainte-Anne-de-la-Pérade	0.8; 1.4	A-40 (Exit 236)	40 EAST: to Portneuf; 40 WEST: to Trois-Rivières
Les Chenaux	Sainte-Anne-de-la-Pérade	3.4	R-354 (West end)	354 EAST: to Saint-Casimir
Les Chenaux	Saint-Prosper-de-Champlain	10.5	Chemin de la Rivière-à-Veillet	WEST: to Sainte-Geneviève-de-Batiscan
Les Chenaux	Saint-Stanislas	19.9; 20.6	R-352 (Overlap 0.7 km)	352 WEST: to Saint-Narcisse; 352 EAST: to Saint-Adelphe
Mékinac	Saint-Tite	41.4; 42.8	R-153 (Overlap 1.4 km)	153 NORTH: to Sainte-Thècle; 153 SOUTH: to Hérouxville
Mékinac	Saint-Roch-de-Mékinac	61.3	R-155	155 SOUTH: to Grandes-Piles; 155 NORTH: to Trois-Rives
Northern terminus of Route 159

== See also ==
- List of Quebec provincial highways
