= André Drouin =

Canadian politician (1947-2017)

André Drouin (c. 1947 – 2 April 2017) was a Canadian politician, who served as a city councillor in Hérouxville, Quebec. He is best known as the author of the controversial Hérouxville Standards, a document which sparked national debate in 2007 over the principle of providing reasonable accommodation for cultural and religious diversity.

== Election ==
Drouin was elected as the council member for Hérouxville's Electoral District No. 6 in 2005.

== Code of conduct ==
Drouin was largely unknown beyond the Mauricie region of the province of Quebec until, in January 2007, he authored a 'code of conduct' that spells out standards for newcomers to his community. The controversial document drew media attention because of its perceived eccentricity and alleged lack of inclusiveness toward certain minorities. It contradicts a number of Supreme Court rulings and notably forbids residents to:

- Kill women by stoning them in public
- Burn women alive or with acid
- Carry kirpans in public

Despite its flaws, Drouin's code raised questions on the limits of tolerance and fueled the debate over reasonable accommodations.

== Tout le monde en parle ==
In February 2007, Drouin went on the set of the French Canadian talk-show Tout le monde en parle to expose his views. While on the show, he claimed that he had no intention to succeed Hérouxville Mayor Martin Périgny. Host Guy A. Lepage and panelist Dany Turcotte expressed serious reservations about whether the code was the appropriate solution to immigration concerns.

== Death ==
Drouin died on 2 April 2017 from cancer, aged 70.
