= Lordship of Champlain =

Coordinates: 46.5333°N 72.4500°W

The Lordship of Champlain was granted in 1664, on the north side of the St. Lawrence River between Trois-Rivières and Quebec City, under the feudal system of New France. Today, the territory of the former manor of Champlain is located in the administrative region of Mauricie in Quebec, Canada. The capital was the town of Champlain.

The Lordship of Champlain stretched from the north shore of the St. Lawrence River (west of the mouth of the Champlain River) up towards the north, parallel to the Lordship of Batiscan on the east side. The north-south dividing line between the two domains also divides the municipalities of Saint-Narcisse and Hérouxville.

== Toponymy ==
During an exploration trip in 1632, Samuel de Champlain, the acknowledged founder of New France, gave his name to the Champlain River. Subsequently, the first lord, Étienne Pézard de la Touche, adopted the place name of Champlain to describe his lordship. The same place name was used by the Catholic parish at Champlain, to describe the town of Champlain in 1845, and the federal electoral district in 1867.

== History of the Lordship ==
Many people used the St. Lawrence River before the creation of the Lordship of Champlain. The indigenous peoples were present along the river for more than 5,000 to 7,000 years. The Vikings sailed along the east coast of Canada and in the waters of the Gulf of St. Lawrence in the 11th century, and French fishermen frequented the Gaspé Peninsula before Jacques Cartier first arrived in Canada in 1534.

In 1535, during his second voyage of discovery on the St. Lawrence River, Cartier passed the site of the future town of Champlain. In 1580, the Basque people made several fishing trips to the St. Lawrence River. In 1603, Samuel de Champlain went to Champlain, Quebec. He erected the first permanent post which became Quebec City in 1608. The town of Trois-Rivières was founded in 1634.

On August 16, 1643, Jacques Aubuchon of Trois-Rivières was granted permission to settle on land of the future Lordship of Champlain. However, he did not do so, mainly because of the property's remoteness and the threat of attacks by the Iroquois. He sold his share in 1645.

The Marsolet and Hertel land grants, of April 5, 1644, were located in the area of the upper Champlain, in the western part of the municipality. Beginning in 1645, Jacques Hertel built a house on his land while continuing to live in Trois-Rivières. Both of these land grants were divided into lots, beginning in 1666.

=== Grant of the Lordship of Champlain ===
According to a deed dated August 8, 1664, the Lordship of Champlain was granted to Étienne Pézard de la Tousche, Governor Augustine Saffray Mézy and Bishop François de Montmorency-Laval. Its scope covered 1.5 lieue of frontage and one lieue deep, on both sides of the Champlain River. The lease did not mention a name given to the lordship. The act of ratification was issued by His Majesty on May 24, 1689.

In 1665, the first land grants were contracted in the Lordship of Champlain. From 1668, manor residents said they lived in "La Touche-Champlain" which was simplified to "Champlain" in 1669. Twenty years after the creation of the Lordship of Champlain, in 1684, Monsignor François de Montmorency-Laval gave the official name to the Catholic parish as "Champlain", pointing out that this was the name in common use. The first lord was called "De la Touche-Champlain" in 1680, or "Pézard Champlain" in 1693 or "Pézard Latouche-Champlain" in 1702. A fort and a chapel were built between 1664 and 1665.

The first acts were registered in 1665 in the parish registry. The first church was built between 1666 and 1671, to replace the chapel of Fort La Touche. In 1671, a flour mill was put into operation. In 1679, the town of Champlain had forty families with 250 people, some who had been established there ever since the founding of the lordship. The Lord was able to grant all the lots along the river's shore.

The first increase in the territory of the lordship seems to have been granted before 1721 by the Jesuits, to Étienne Pézard de la Tousche according to Jean Bouffard. Another increase, with a range of three "lieues" deep, was granted on April 28, 1697, to Madame De la Tousche by the Governor, Louis Frontenac Buade, and the steward, Jean Bochart de Champigny. The ratification act was by His Majesty on May 28, 1700.

=== Étienne Pézard de la Tousch ===
Étienne Pézard de la Tousche, a military man, was born in Blois, Orleans, France, the son of Claude Pézard and Marie Masson. He left France for Canada in 1661, and was immediately appointed a lieutenant, then captain, of the garrison at Trois-Rivières. During this assignment, Pézard gave assistance to Pierre Boucher in the drafting of the document "Histoire véritable et, naturelle…" (real history and natural ...) (Paris, 1664).

In June 1664, Pézard left Trois-Rivières to command the garrison at Montreal. He married Madeleine Mullois de La Borde on June 20, 1664, at Notre Dame Church in Montreal; they had five children. Although Pézard was appointed governor of Montreal by Augustine Saffray Mézy (on the same day as his marriage), this appointment never came into effect. The lords of Montreal opposed, alleging their right to appoint the Governor.

Following this setback, Mézy granted Pézard a manor on the north shore of St. Lawrence river on August 8, 1664. Pézard immediately began to operate the Lordship, unlike the majority of the lords of his time. He immediately began construction of a mansion near the mouth of the Champlain River, on the edge of a rock and a church in 1665. This stately new concession exacerbated the Jesuits who believed their manorial fully vested on the north shore of the St. Lawrence River between the Saint-Maurice River and the Batiscan River. Meanwhile, the Jesuits actively pursued the settlement of Cap-de-la-Madeleine.

Through his contacts with the authorities of Trois-Rivières, as well as efforts among captains, established families, soldiers and immigrants, Pézard attracted pioneers, and the first families come from Trois-Rivières, such as those of Antoine Desrosiers, François Chorel and Pierre Dandonneau, among 22 land grants in 1665. To thank Pézard for his efforts in encouraging colonization, the steward gave him a "flight" from the royal stables.

The date of Pézard's death is unknown, and is not recorded in religious or civil records of New France. Historians conclude he died in 1696, based on documents that highlight his name in 1695. In addition, according to historian Jean Hamelin, documents written in November 1696 refer to the widow Mary Magdalene Mullois, who died in 1704.

== Other important dates ==
• April 5, 1644: concession of the fief Marsolet and fief Tree to the Cross, located in the present territory of the Municipality of Champlain.

• August 8, 1664: grant of the lordship of Champlain. This date proves the founding of the town of Champlain, Quebec, the eighth oldest town in New France.

• 1664: Construction of Fort La Touche-Champlain, in Champlain, at the mouth of the Champlain River.

• 1664-1665: The first settlers moved to the side of the lordship of Champlain. One of 34 lots granted in 1664-65 by Pézard. Some of the first families come from Trois-Rivières, such as those of Antoine Desrosiers, François Chorel and Pierre Dandonneau.

• In 1666: concessions of the fief Hertel begin to be granted.

• 1667: concessions on fief Marsolet begin to be granted to tenants.

• 1789: acquisition of the manor of Champlain by Joseph Drapeau (April 13, 1752 - November 3, 1810). He is a lord, a merchant and politician in Lower Canada. In 1809 and 1810, he was elected to Northumberland to House of Assembly of Lower Canada.

• 1797: sale of the manor of Champlain by Joseph Drapeau to buy half of the Isle of Orleans.

• 1830-1850: emergence of the present village in the center of town. In 1860, there were 20 locations in the village. In 1933, there were 150.

• 1854: the end of the feudal regime in New France.

• 1855: Creation of the Municipality of parish of La Visitation-de-Champlain in the first municipal boundaries of the Quebec.

== See also ==
- Government of Trois-Rivières
- Lordship of Batiscan
- Champlain (homonymy)
- Champlain (municipalité)
- Saint-Luc-de-Vincennes
- Saint-Narcisse
- Hérouxville
- Champlain (federal electoral district)
- Champlain (provincial electoral district)
