= Hérouxville =

- Parish municipality
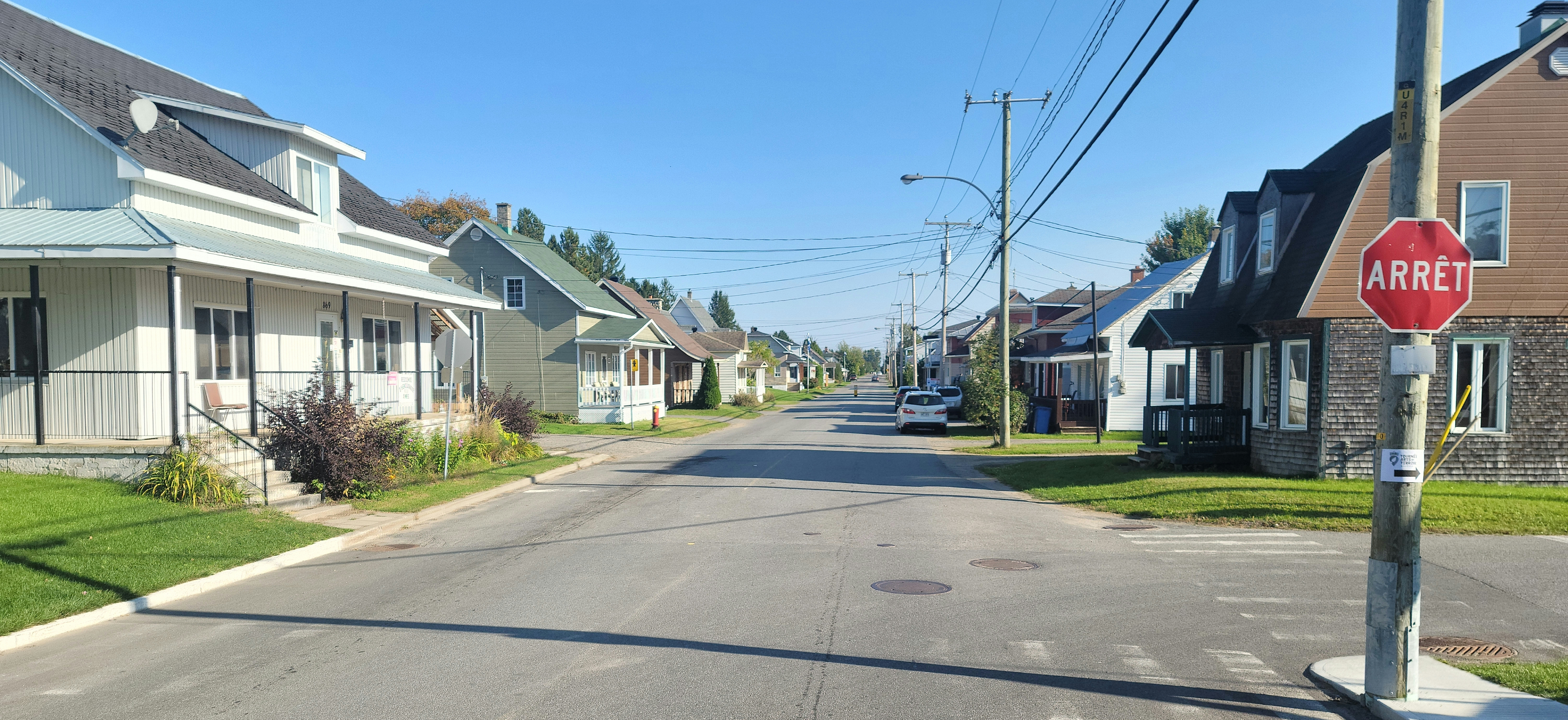

- Coat of arms

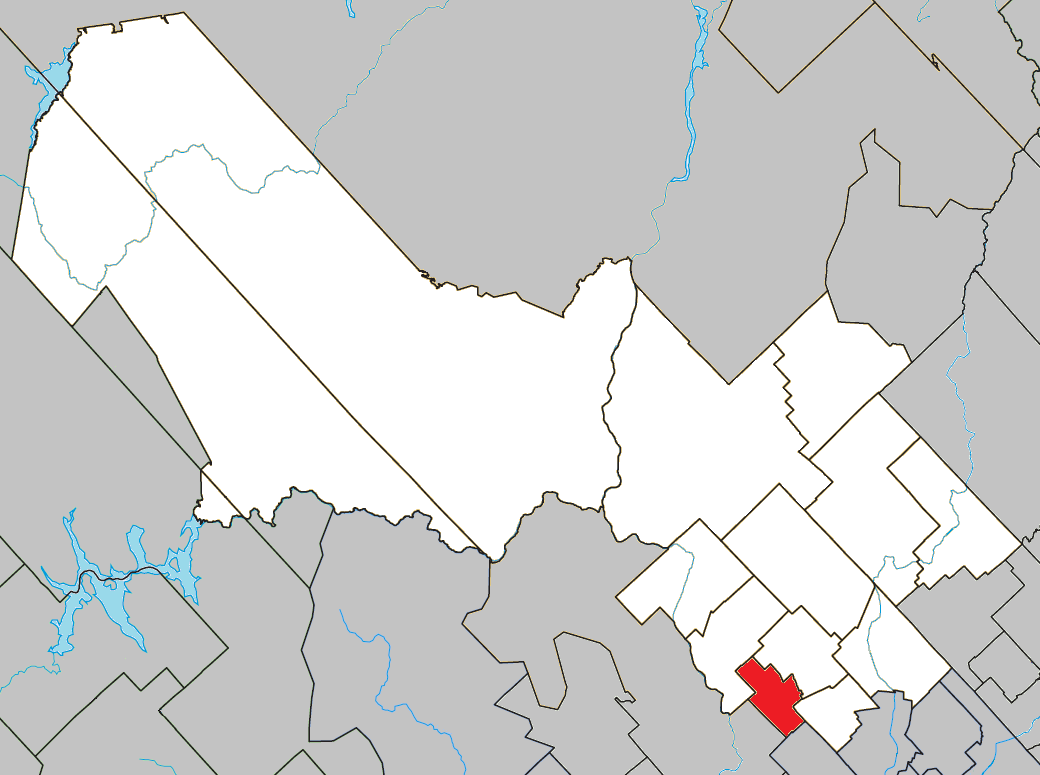
- Location within Mékinac RCM

- Location in central Quebec
- Coordinates: 46°40′N 72°37′W
- Country: Canada
- Province: Quebec
- Region: Mauricie
- RCM: Mékinac
- Founded: 1897
- Constituted: April 13, 1904
- Named for: Joseph-Euchariste Héroux

Government
  - Mayor: Bernard Thompson
  - Fed. riding: Saint-Maurice—Champlain
  - Prov. riding: Laviolette

Area
  - Total: 53.41 km^{2} (20.62 sq mi)
  - Land: 54.72 km^{2} (21.13 sq mi)
- There is an apparent discrepancy between 2 authoritative sources.

Population (2021)
  - Total: 1,367
  - Density: 25/km^{2} (65/sq mi)
  - Change 2016-21: ▲7.0%
  - Dwellings: 685
- Time zone: UTC−5 (EST)
  - Summer (DST): UTC−4 (EDT)
- Postal code(s): G0X 1J0
- Area codes: 418 and 581
- Highways: R-153
- Website: municipalite.herouxville.qc.ca

Hérouxville (French pronunciation: [eʁuvil]; formerly called Saint-Timothée [sɛ̃ timɔte]) is a parish municipality in the Mékinac Regional County Municipality in the administrative region of Mauricie, in the province of Quebec, Canada. Its watershed is mainly part of the Batiscanie.

Hérouxville is directly on the route to Saint-Tite, in addition to being the northeast gateway to Mauricie, a region renowned for its lush forests and quaint villages.

Hérouxville is small rural farming parish. Its main economic activity is agriculture; forestry and recreational tourism are part of the local economy. Hérouxville also offers its visitors throughout the year the facilities and services of:

- Camp Val Notre-Dame, a family vacation and reunion camp,
- Domaine Tavibois, a rest and healing center.

According to the revised development plan of the Mékinac Regional County Municipality, effective February 27, 2008, Hérouxville had 104 chalets, 22 farms operating in 1685 hectares under cultivation, 13 shops/services and 3 industrial facilities.

In 2007, Hérouxville created controversy when the town's councilors instituted a "code of conduct" for an immigrant population which did not exist, in a move which was widely perceived as xenophobic and racist.

== History ==
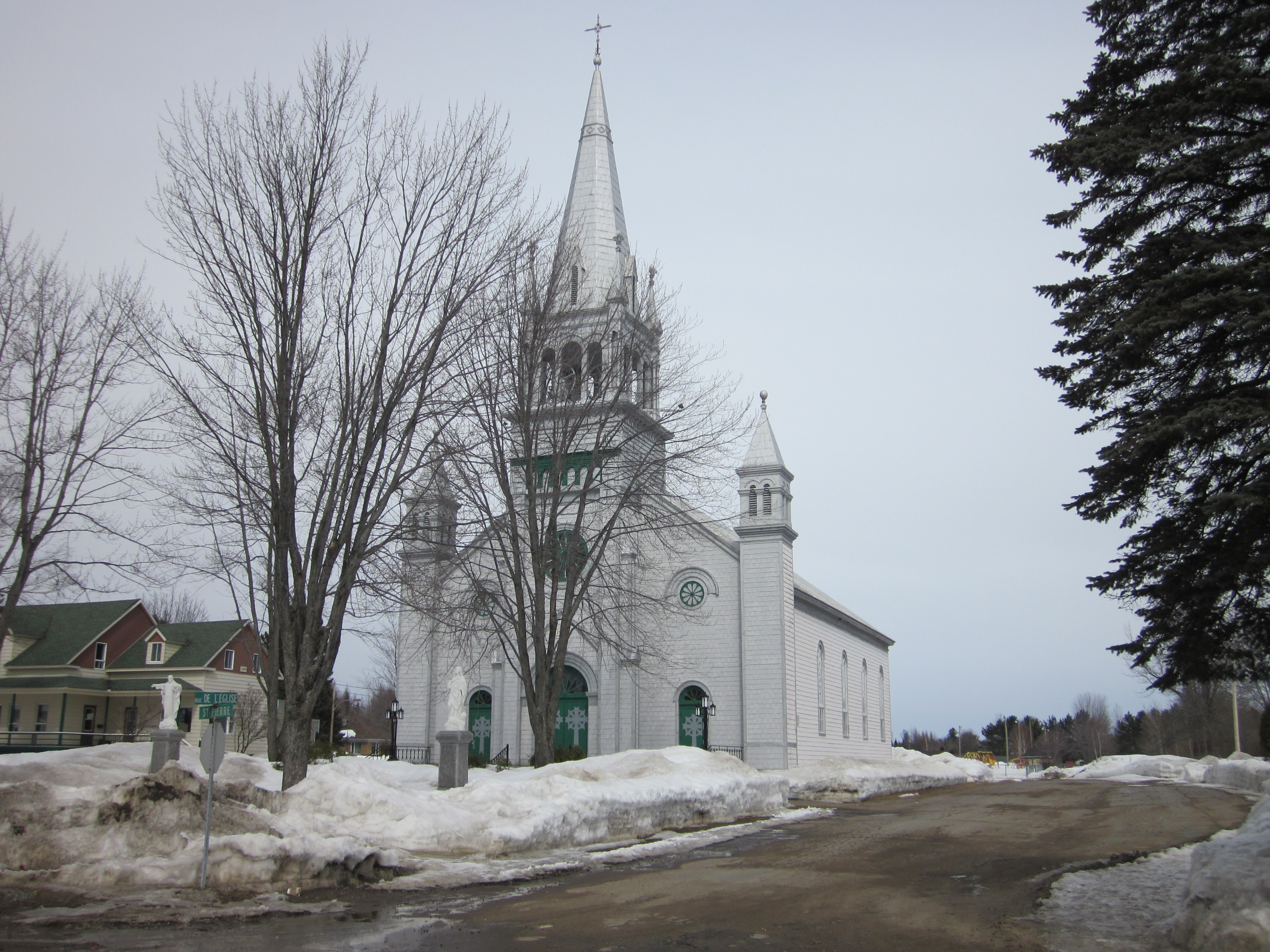
St-Timotée Hérouxville parrish church

The proximity of Hérouxville with the Saint-Maurice River had a major impact on its economic development from 1850 to the end of the nineteenth century. The first steamboat arrived in batteries to 1853–54. Completed in 1880, the railway from Trois-Rivières reached Grandes-Piles (Saint-Jacques-des-Piles), causing a rush in forestry industry up to the Haute-Mauricie (Upper-Mauricie) area. The construction of the railway to Lake Saint-Jean, then the Transcontinental Railway, and the harnessing of Shawinigan Falls and Grand-Mère (Grand Mother) Falls by hydroelectric dams changed the region. Then batteries were no longer the same economic utility as the site of transhipment between steamship of the Saint-Maurice River and trains.

The name "Saint-Timothé" was assigned to this Catholic mission, as Tite, Thècle and Timothé were disciples of St. Paul in the first century. The origin of the name "Hérouxville" was a nod of respect to Father Joseph-Euchariste Héroux (1863-1943), founder of this Catholic parish. He exercised his priestly work from 1897 to 1899 in the mission of Saint-Timothé. He opened the civil registers. Through his work, he contributed to the canonical constitution of the parish of Saint-Timothée, on September 15, 1903.

Founded in 1898, the post office in the village was named "Saint-Timothé d'Hérouxville", to pay tribute to Father Héroux. The civil erection of the municipality, as of 13 April 1904, was formalized by publication in the official gazette of Quebec, confirming the name of "Municipality of the Parish of Saint-Timothé". Historically, in popular usage, the terms "Saint-Timothé" and "Hérouxville" were often juxtaposed to designate the town, the village, the station, the post office, the municipality, the school board, etc. This double appellation proved confusing in the public mind. The spelling "Timothée" varied according to the authors or sources: Thimothée, Thimothé, Timothé, etc. In addition, two areas of Montérégie (QC) use the toponym Saint-Timothée, creating occasional errors for deliveries.

The village was founded in 1897 by Father Joseph Euchariste Héroux and became the Catholic parish of Saint Timothy as of September 15, 1903. The church was built in 1904 according to the plans designed by architect Charles Lafond. While the civil foundation was recognized April 13, 1904.

Agriculture has played an important role in the history of Hérouxville, including providing supplies for missions and projects of the St-Maurice Valley.

To avoid the toponymic confusions, the municipality adopted in 1983 the designation "Saint-Timothé de Hérouxville". The "Commission de toponymie du Québec" (Geographical Names Board of Québec) formalized the toponym "Hérouxville" on January 9, 1986.

=== Code of conduct ===
Hérouxville received international attention in January 2007 when its town council passed measures concerning practices which the residents deemed unsuitable for life in Hérouxville for potential new immigrants, despite the fact that the town has no immigrant population. Hérouxville has a population of about 1,300 residents who are entirely White, francophone, and nominally Catholic.

The mayor and the municipal council approved a code of behavior for immigrants, which occurred in the context of a debate on "reasonable accommodation" for other cultures in Quebec. The code forbade carrying a weapon to school (even if symbolic), covering one's face, and indicated that accommodation of prayer in school will not be permitted. It also stated that stoning women or burning them alive is prohibited, as is female genital cutting. It attests that "Our people eat to nourish the body, not the soul" and that health-care professionals "do not have to ask permission to perform blood transfusions."

The code was widely criticized as being premised on racist and insulting cultural stereotypes. The Montreal Gazette noted that "while the values espoused might be universal, the code has sparked an international controversy because the intention appears to be to scare off newcomers with a code that presumes the worst of them."

Quebec Premier Jean Charest called Hérouxville's measures "exaggerated" after town councillor André Drouin appeared on a popular Quebec television show called Tout le monde en parle and said the reasonable accommodation situation had reached a state of emergency in Quebec. The town later revised the standards after a delegation of Muslim women from the Canadian Islamic Congress came to meet townspeople.

La Presse columnist Alain Dubuc wrote that:

Although Hérouxville's reaction was xenophobic, immigrants may not be the main target of this revolt ... There is something else at work here, and it's the revolt against the big city, its ideas, its lifestyle, its influence. What happened in Hérouxville is the ultimate expression of the fracture between the metropolis and the regions ... Hérouxville was angered by the tolerance of Montrealers, by their passivity towards the changes brought out by immigration, by their multi-ethnic culture, their rejection of religion, their 'gay village' and their arrogant elites. For small towns such as Hérouxville, the real threat to their identity has little to do with veil-clad Muslim women, it is the urban world that is gradually drifting away from the traditional model.

In a 2011 documentary, former councillor André Drouin claimed that the creation of the code was a "joke" designed to "provoke" the population in order to make things change.

== Geography ==
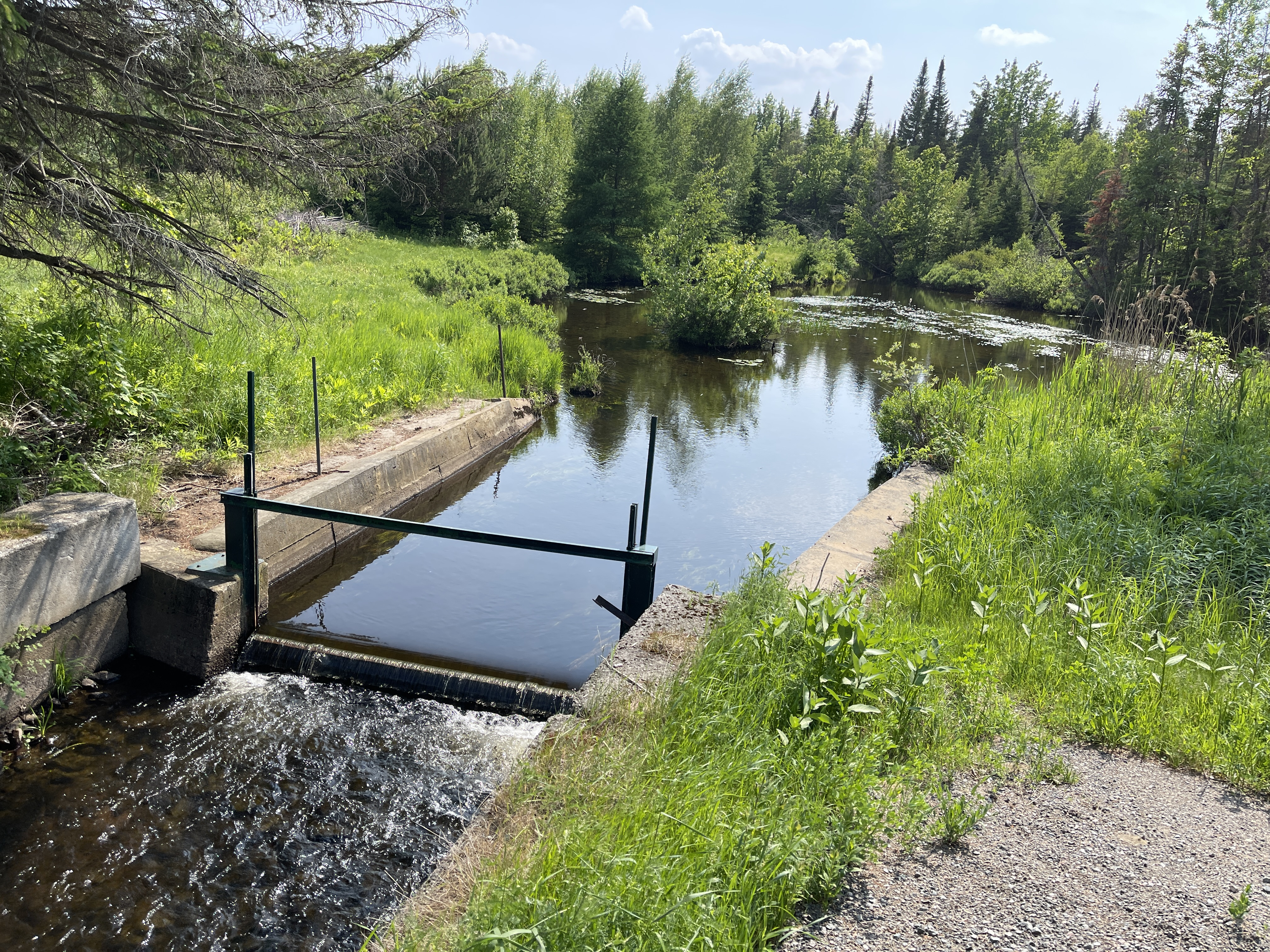
Dam, Rivière à la Tortue

The village is crossed by Route 153 between the municipalities of Saint-Tite on the east and Shawinigan on the southwest. Hérouxville is 9.6 km from the center of Saint-Tite and 13.3 km from Grand-Mère.

Hérouxville is the gateway to the northeastern part of the Mauricie, a corner known for its forests and small towns. A farming village, this place offers its visitors the Laurentian Forest, with its lakes and rivers.

The town centre is in the style of the seigneurial period: Rang Saint-Pierre, as Main Street, where the houses are never really distanced but deep soil. Its tallest building is the church Saint-Timothée.

The municipality of Hérouxville extends around the northern part of Lac-à-la-Tortue, while the municipality of Lac-à-la-Tortue administered the rest of the lake and surrounding area. In 2001, the municipality of Lac-à-la-Tortue merged with the city of Shawinigan.

The lake, which is surrounded by cottages and residences, includes the first seaplane base in the civil history of Canada. Airmen arrived there in 1919, inaugurating the first commercial flight of Canadian history, immediately after the end of the World War I. Originally, the aviation of Lac-à-la-Tortue used to monitor forest fires. Gradually, the seaplane base has developed a large tourist resort and for hunting and fishing stays in the northern regions.

=== Watershed ===
Despite its proximity to the Saint-Maurice River, the territory of Hérouxville is drained by three sub-basins:

- South Mékinac River which has its origins in Grandes-Piles and drains the area of Tavibois at the end of Saint-Pierre row North, and Camp Val Notre-Dame;
- Rivière Noire (Black River) which drains the west and south of the village area, collecting the waters of Duchesne Creek; this river runs south through near the railway station of Garneau Junction; then turns to the southwest and flows into a bay (1 km deep) of Saint-Maurice River, on the north side of the old iron bridge spanning at Grand-Mère.
- Rivière à la Tortue which rises in Lac à la Tortue, through the territories of Hérouxville and Saint-Séverin before emptying in the Rivière des Envies to Saint-Stanislas.
- Rivière des Envies, which drains the northern part of the territory of Hérouxville, near the limit of Saint-Tite.
- Rivière des Chutes, which has its source in the little Lac Noire (Black Lake) (popularly designated "Morin Lake"), 1.7 km (direct line) east of Lac-à-la-Tortue, at the limit of Hérouxville (row X) and Saint-Narcisse (row Côte Saint-Pierre Coté Sud and the first senior Radnor). (This sub-watershed drains a very small area of Hérouxville.)

Thus, the territory of Hérouxville is mainly part of the watershed of the Rivière des Envies, a tributary of the Batiscan River.

=== Wetland ===
A sector of wetland covering three municipalities is southeast of Lac-à-la-Tortue, head of water between the watershed of Lac-à-la-Tortue (including the outlet of Lake Atocas), the rivière à la Tortue and Rivière des Chutes:

1. Row "Cote Saint-Pierre Coté Sud-Ouest", a few lands in southeast of Hérouxville and a dozen lands of Saint-Narcisse;
2. Row "Cote Saint-Pierre Coté Northeast" in Saint-Narcisse, a few limited and isolated wetlands covering about 14 lots (near the road linking the Lac-à-la-Tortue and Saint-Narcisse);
3. Row X 's in Hérouxville, some isolated areas at the southeast of the row, spread on eight lots;
4. Row IX Lac-à-la-Tortue in Radnor Township, three lots (near the limit of Hérouxville);
5. Forefront of Radnor in Saint-Narcisse, north-east area of the row, is the head area of the Rivière des Chutes.

== Demographics ==
In the 2021 Census of Population conducted by Statistics Canada, Hérouxville had a population of 1,367 living in 626 of its 685 total private dwellings, a change of 7% from its 2016 population of 1,278. With a land area of 54.72 km^{2} (21.13 sq mi), it had a population density of 25.0/km^{2} (64.7/sq mi) in 2021.

Historical census populations – Hérouxville

Year	Pop.	±%
1911	921	—
1921	1,032	+12.1%
1931	1,005	−2.6%
1941	1,001	−0.4%
1951	1,010	+0.9%
1956	1,072	+6.1%
1961	1,129	+5.3%

Year	Pop.	±%
1966	1,167	+3.4%
1971	1,058	−9.3%
1976	1,017	−3.9%
1981	1,098	+8.0%
1986	1,138	+3.6%
1991	1,253	+10.1%
1996	1,314	+4.9%

Year	Pop.	±%
2001	1,275	−3.0%
2006	1,235	−3.1%
2011	1,340	+8.5%
2016	1,278	−4.6%
2021	1,367	+7.0%

Source: Statistics Canada

Mother tongue:

- English as first language: 1.1%
- French as first language: 97.4%
- English and French as first language: 1.1%
- Other as first language: 0.4%

Note: According to the federal census of 2021, 270 inhabitants of Hérouxville have some knowledge of French and English.

== See also ==
- List of communities in Quebec
- Batiscanie, Quebec
- Lac-à-la-Tortue Ecological Reserve
