= Saint-Stanislas, Mauricie =

Saint-Stanislas
- Municipality
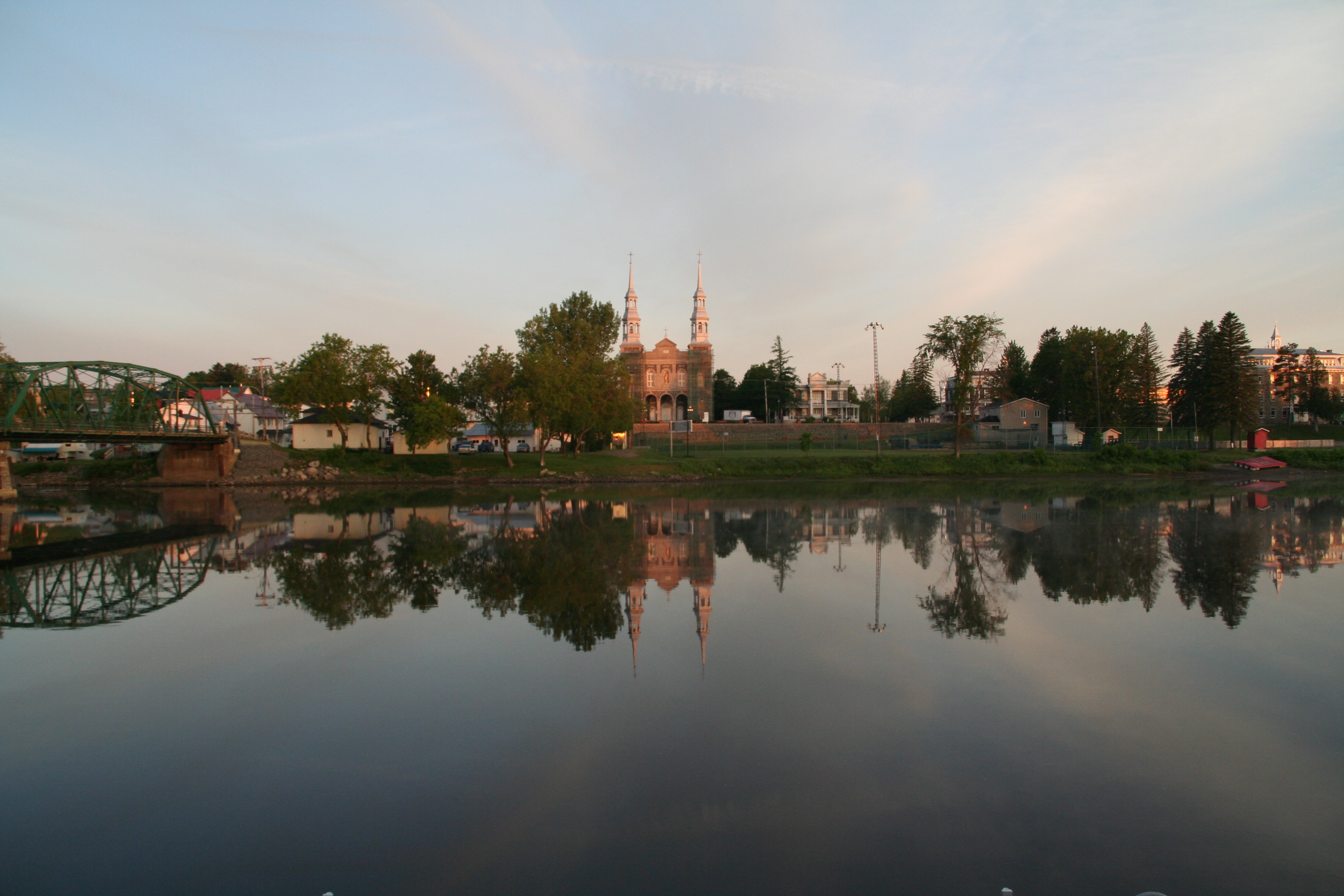
- On the Batiscan River's banks
- Motto: "In duty with honour"
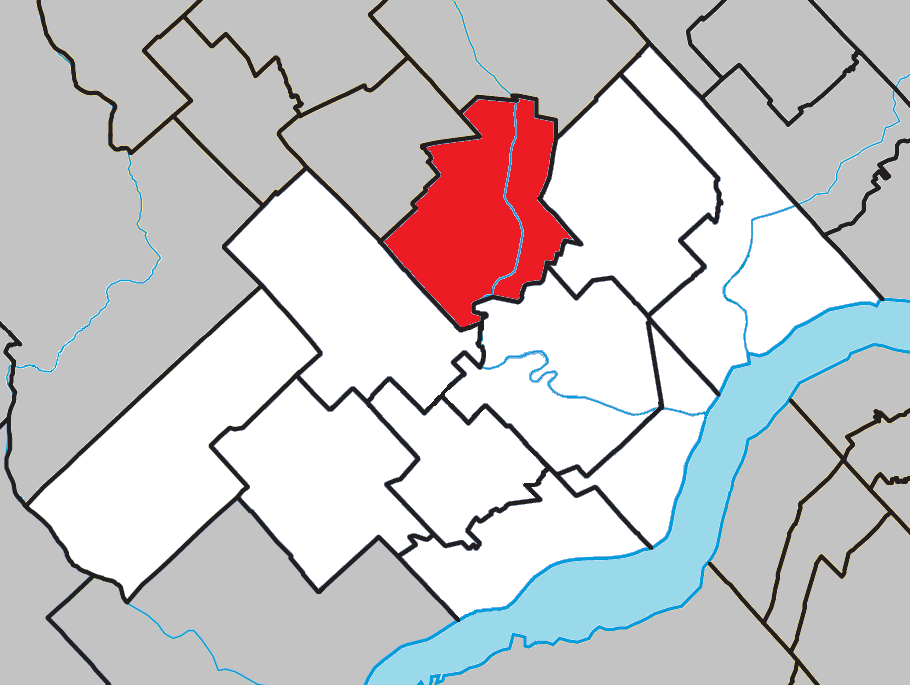
- Location within Les Chenaux RCM

- Location in central Quebec
- Coordinates: 46°37′N 72°24′W
- Country: Canada
- Province: Quebec
- Region: Mauricie
- RCM: Les Chenaux
- Settled: 1730
- Constituted: April 17, 1976

Government
  - Mayor: Luc Pellerin
  - Fed. riding: Saint-Maurice—Champlain
  - Prov. riding: Champlain

Area
  - Total: 91.97 km^{2} (35.51 sq mi)
  - Land: 89.38 km^{2} (34.51 sq mi)

Population (2021)
  - Total: 1,001
  - Density: 11.2/km^{2} (29/sq mi)
  - Pop (2016-21): ▼0.9%
  - Dwellings: 578
- Time zone: UTC−5 (EST)
  - Summer (DST): UTC−4 (EDT)
- Postal code(s): G0X 3E0
- Area code: 819
- Highways: R-159 R-352
- Website: www.saint-stanislas.ca

Saint-Stanislas (French pronunciation: [sɛ̃ stanislas]), old name Deux-Rivières (Village), is a municipality part of Les Chenaux Regional County Municipality, in Mauricie, Quebec, Canada.

== History ==
=== Down the current of Quebec's rivers ===
In the early 1800s, in Quebec, mainly in the Outaouais, Mauricie and Saguenay–Lac-Saint-Jean regions, attempts to transport wood by water began. In Batiscanie, the parish of Saint-Stanislas has a large reservoir of labour for work in rivers and forests.

The village area of Saint-Stanislas is said to have had 422 inhabitants as early as 1851 and 593 twenty years later. Beginning in 1852, Price Brothers and Company exploited the forest of the Batiscan Valley. Several sawmills were built on the Batiscan and des Envies rivers.

The presence of sawmilling facilities and the development of logging throughout the Saint-Maurice River basin allowed Saint-Stanislas to establish itself as the main basin for labour and forestry subcontracting until about 1870, before being overtaken by that of Saint-Tite, located further north, in the Laurentian mountains.

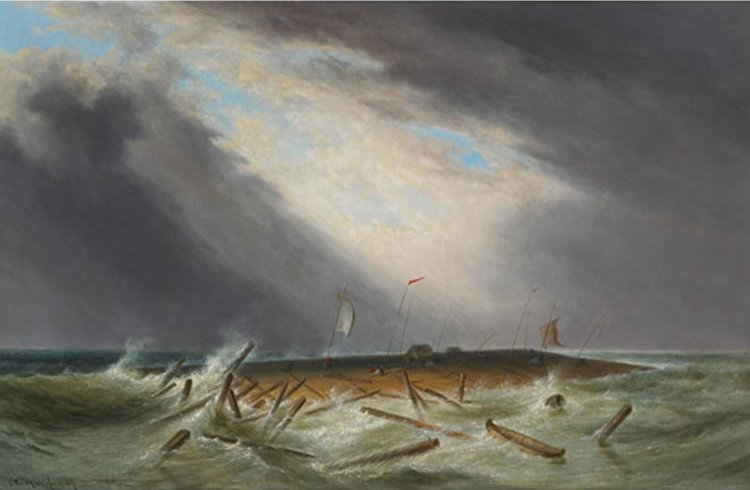
Lumber Raft on S. Lawrence river, oil 1867, Cornelius Krieghoff (1815-1872)

The timber was transported by floating, down the current of the rivers, which required the work of cages and log drivers (Cajeux - Draveurs). The first types of trees cut were — Pin blanc L. — Pinus strobus. — White pine (eastern white pine)., shipped to Great Britain.

- The cageux, this Ulysses of the St. Lawrence River, and tributarys St-Maurice, Batiscan, Saguenay, Jacques-Cartier, Sainte-Anne (Les Chenaux) as exemples, was responsible for assembling the rafts and piloting the huge wooden train made of squared pine — also called a cage — to a port of embarkation.
- The log driver, a daring tightrope walker of the rivers, was responsible for controlling the free floating of cut tree trunks that were thrown into a watercourse in order to reach a sawmill or a pulp and paper mill.

The settlers who had already established themselves took advantage of the proximity of the construction sites to sell their agricultural production and at the same time provided a workforce for whom working in the forest represented an additional income.''

== Geography ==
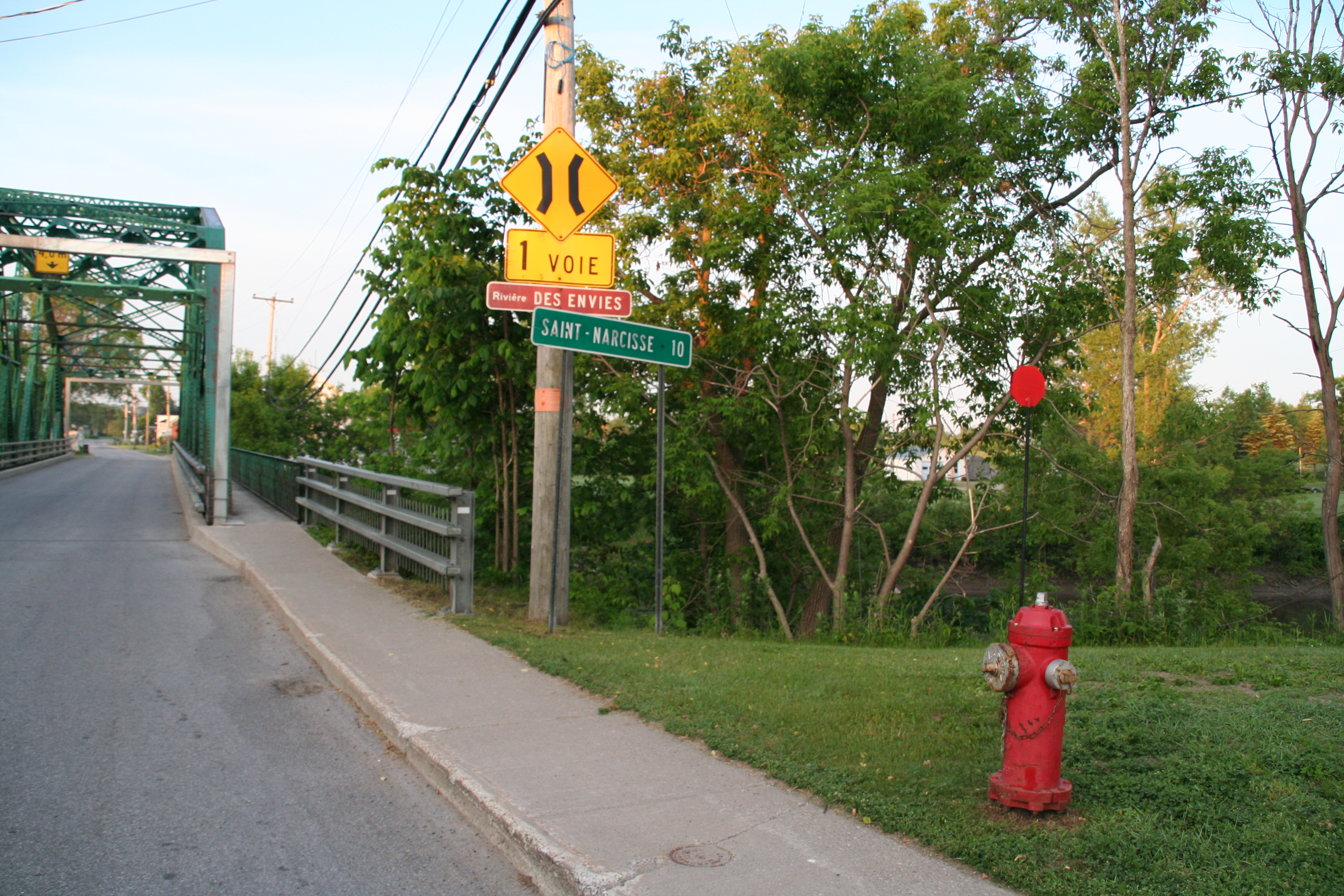
Pont sur la Rivière des Envies, rue Principale

The territory of Saint-Stanislas is set ablaze in gigantic geographical and geological formations: on the Canadian Shield, at the foot of the Laurentian mountain range, on the north shore of the St. Lawrence River, in the Saint-Narcisse moraine, the boreal forest, among other elements.

The municipality was established on both sides of the Batiscan River, at the confluence of the Rivière des Envies, about twenty kilometres from the St. Lawrence River, in Batiscanie, the vernacular name of an undefined territory.

Saint-Stanislas is part of this group of parishes that historians describe as the first pioneer front of the Mauricie region in the nineteenth century.'' (Photos)

== Demographics ==
In the 2021 Census of Population conducted by Statistics Canada, Saint-Stanislas had a population of 1,001 living in 506 of its 578 total private dwellings, a change of −0.9% from its 2016 population of 1,010. With a land area of 89.38 km^{2} (34.51 sq mi), it had a population density of 11.2/km^{2} (29.0/sq mi) in 2021.

Historical census populations – Saint-Stanislas

Year	Pop.	±%
1981	1,443	—
1986	1,327	−8.0%
1991	1,230	−7.3%
1996	1,174	−4.6%
2001	1,076	−8.3%

Year	Pop.	±%
2006	1,033	−4.0%
2011	1,029	−0.4%
2016	1,010	−1.8%
2021	1,001	−0.9%

Source: Statistics Canada

Private dwellings occupied by usual residents (2021): 506 (total dwellings: 578)

Mother language of Saint-Stanislas's citizens (2021):

- French as first language: 98.0%
- English as first language: 0.5%
- English and French as first languages: 1.0%
- Other as first language: 1.0%

In 2021 Census, 215 particulars declared themselves as bilingual (English & French), 785 speaking French only and none speaking English only. The median age of the population was 56.8 years in 2021. In addition, 88% of the population was aged 15 and over.

== See also ==
- Lordship of Sainte-Anne-de-la-Pérade (Seigneurie de Sainte-Anne-de-la-Pérade)
- Lordship of Batiscan (Seigneurie de Batiscan)
- Batiscanie
