= Cachée River (Saint-Maurice River tributary) =

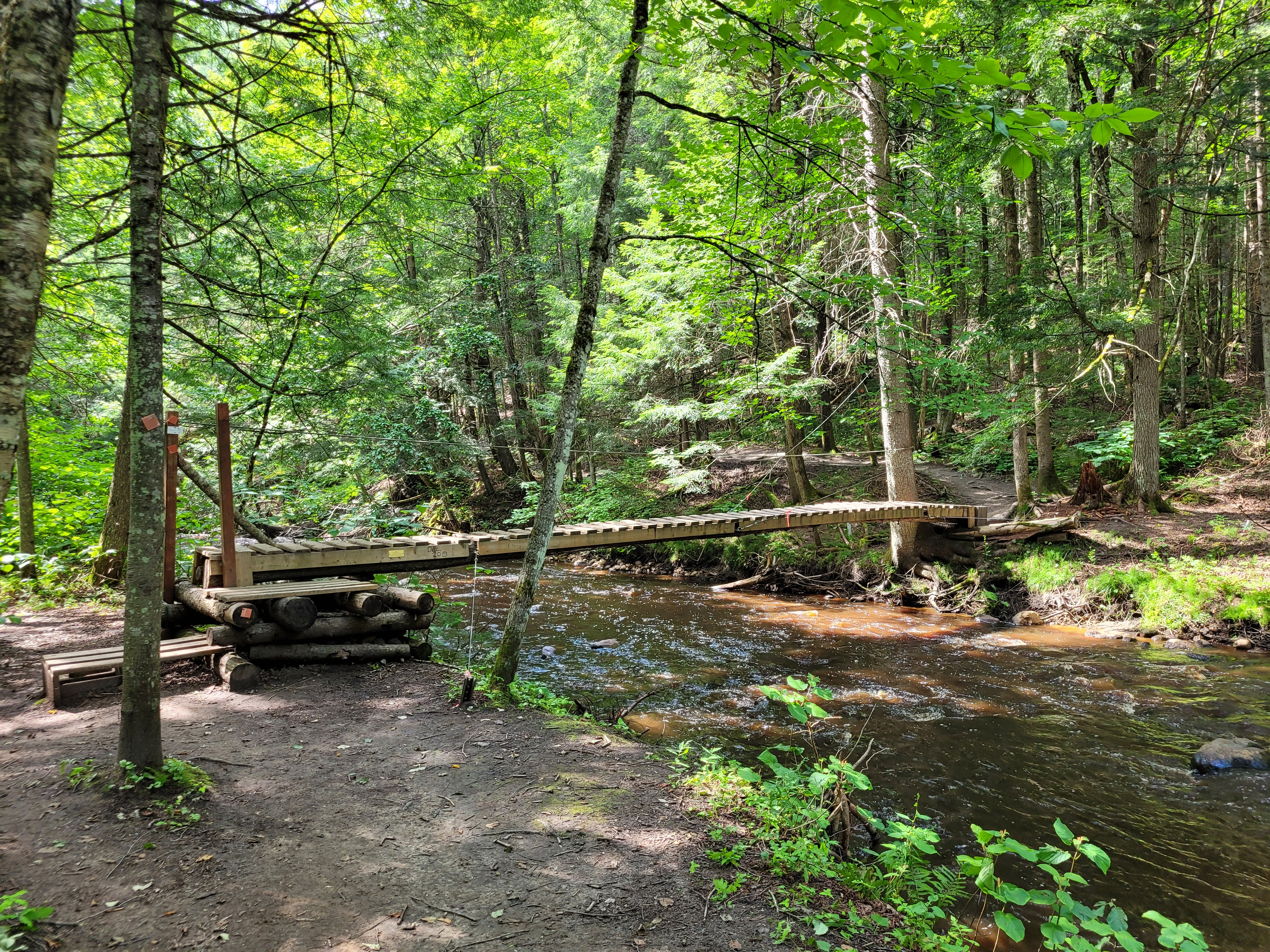

- Location within Quebec

Location
- Country: Canada
- Province: Quebec
- Region: Mauricie
- Regional County Municipality: Les Chenaux Regional County Municipality
- Municipality: Notre-Dame-du-Mont-Carmel

Physical characteristics
- Source: Lake Trotochaud
  - location: Notre-Dame-du-Mont-Carmel
  - coordinates: 46.52611°N 72.63361°W
  - elevation: 122 m (400 ft)
- Mouth: Saint-Maurice River
  - location: Notre-Dame-du-Mont-Carmel
  - coordinates: 46.455486°N 72.742858°W
  - elevation: 109 m (358 ft)
- Length: 17.6 km (10.9 mi)

Basin features
- Tributaries
  - left: (Upstream) Cours d’eau Brisson.
  - right: (Upstream) Discharge of lac Bellevue, discharge of lac Guylvie.

The Rivière Cachée (English: Hidden River) is a tributary of the Saint-Maurice River, flowing on the north bank of the Saint Lawrence River, entirely in Notre-Dame-du-Mont-Carmel (Parish Municipality), in Les Chenaux Regional County Municipality (RCM), in Mauricie administrative region, in province of Quebec, Canada.

The course of the Hidden River descends mainly in the forest zone, passing on the west side of the Notre-Dame-du-Mont-Carmel (Parish Municipality.

== Geography ==
The Hidden River rises at the mouth of Valmont Lake (length: 0.7 kilometres (0.43 mi); altitude: 122 metres (400 ft)). This lake is located in the southern part of a large swamp area which extends in the sector of Shawinigan-Sud, in Lac-à-la-Tortue and Saint-Narcisse. This source is located at:

- 4.1 kilometres (2.5 mi) north of the village of Notre-Dame-du-Mont-Carmel;
- 8.7 kilometres (5.4 mi) east of downtown Shawinigan-Sud;
- 10.0 kilometres (6.2 mi) south-east of the village center of Saint-Narcisse.

From its source, the Cachée river flows on 17.6 kilometres (10.9 mi), according to the following segments:

- 3.7 kilometres (2.3 mi) towards the south-west, by crossing the chemin du rang Saint-Louis, up to the Lamothe road bridge;
- 2.6 kilometres (1.6 mi) south-west, up to the Chemin Saint-Louis road bridge;
- 2.9 kilometres (1.8 mi) (or 1.8 kilometres (1.1 mi) in a direct line) to the south, crossing route 157 and winding up to veterans road bridge;
- 8.4 kilometres (5.2 mi) (or 4.1 kilometres (2.5 mi) in a direct line) towards the south-west, winding up to its confluence.

The Cachée river flows on the east bank of the Saint-Maurice river upstream of the La Gabelle dam. The confluence of the Cachée river is located upstream of the La Gabelle dam at:

- 0.8 kilometres (0.50 mi) upstream of the La Gabelle dam;
- 2.2 kilometres (1.4 mi) south-east of the railway bridge spanning the Saint-Maurice river.

== Toponymy ==
The sinuousness of its course at the bottom of a flow in the lower part explains the hidden character of the river. The Hidden Coast of the old road segment connecting Shawinigan-Sud and Cap-de-la-Madeleine included curves at the bottom of the flow which formerly caused several road accidents.

== Photos ==
In Notre-Dame-du-Mont-Carmel

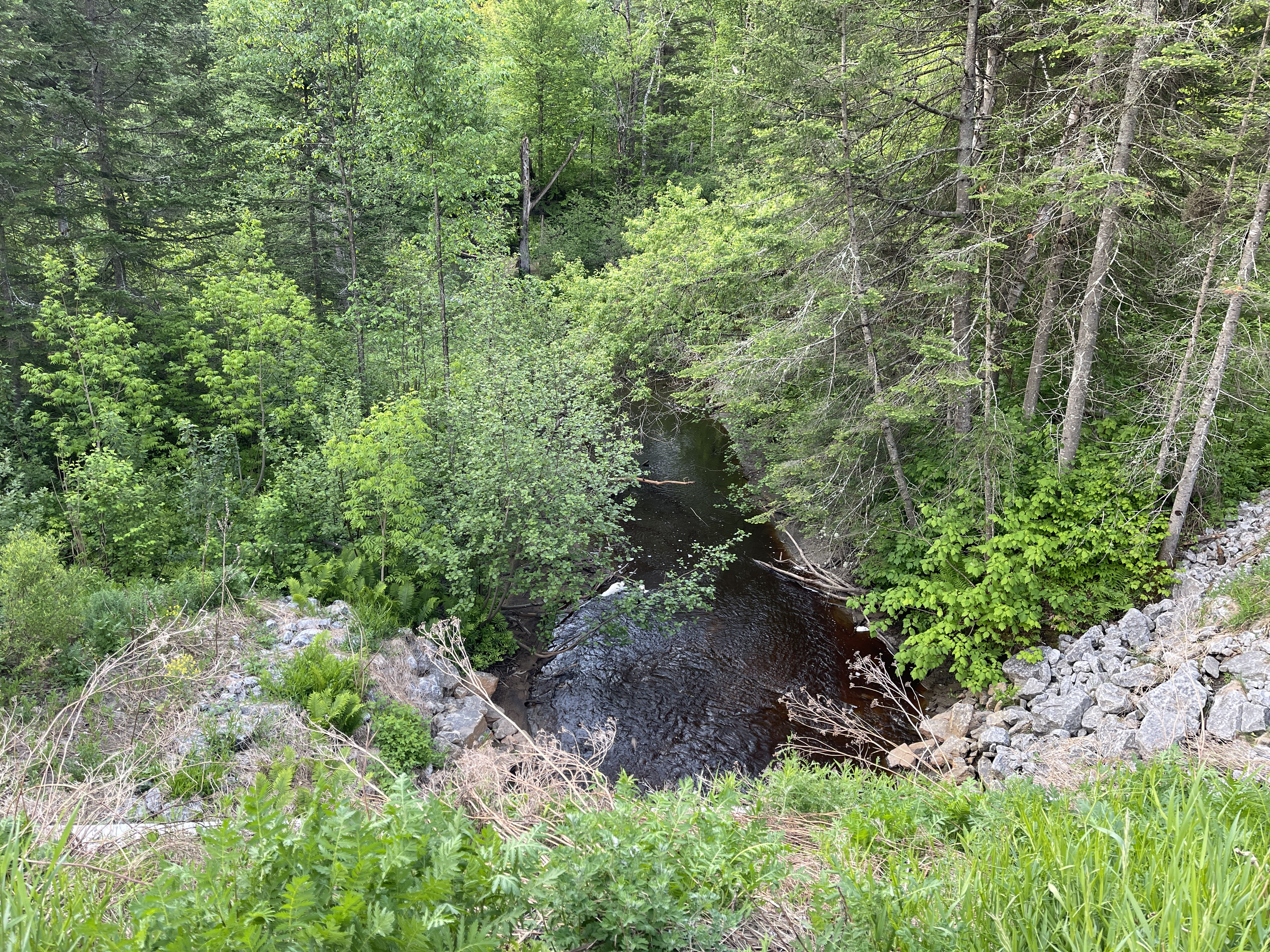
From bridge -01591, rang Saint-Louis

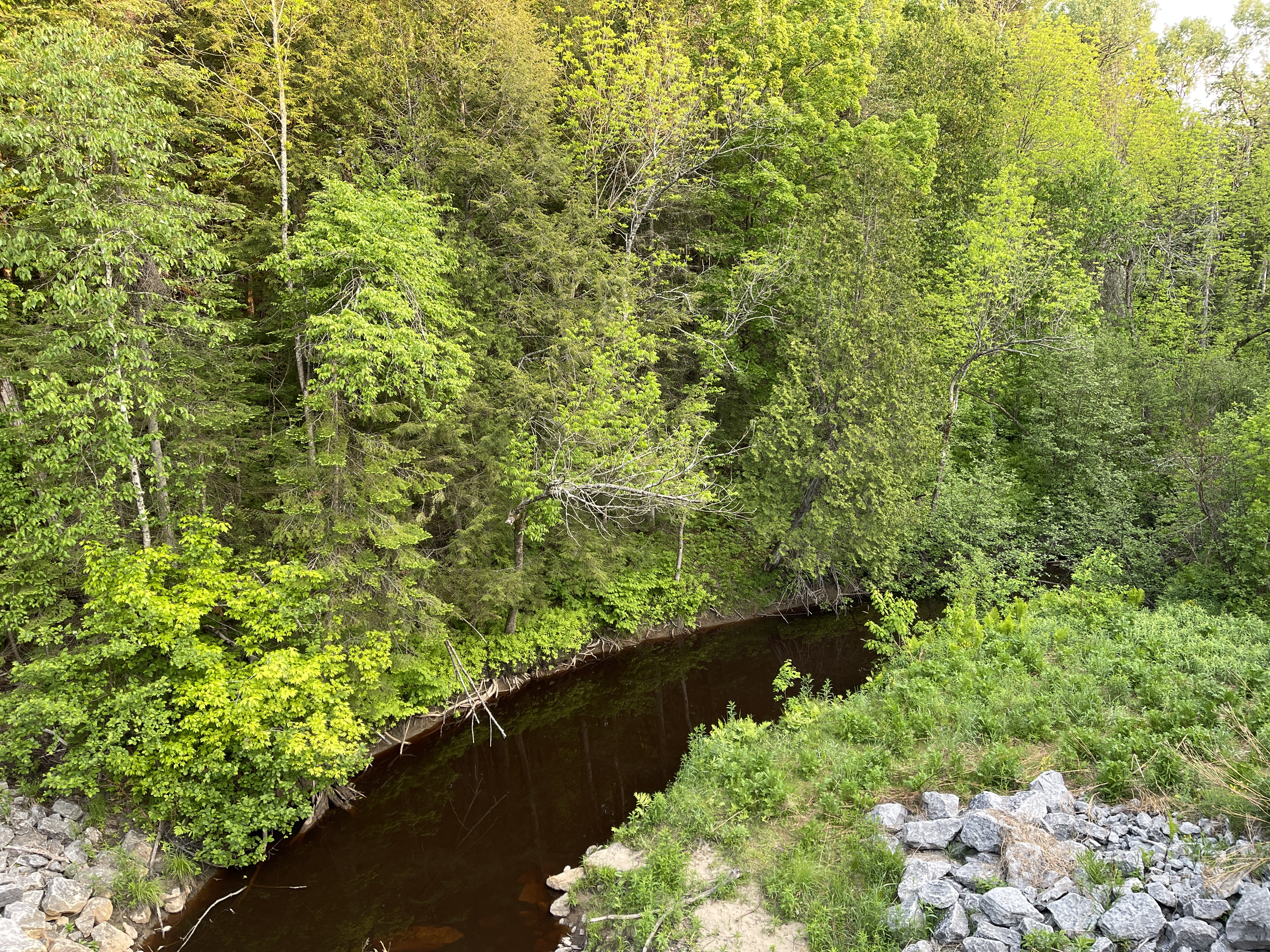
From bridge -01591, rang Saint-Louis'

== Appendices ==
=== Related articles ===
- Notre-Dame-du-Mont-Carmel, municipality
- Saint-Maurice River, stream
- St. Lawrence River, stream
- List of rivers of the Saint-Maurice basin (fr)
- List of rivers of Quebec
