= Former Saint-Narcisse Power Station =

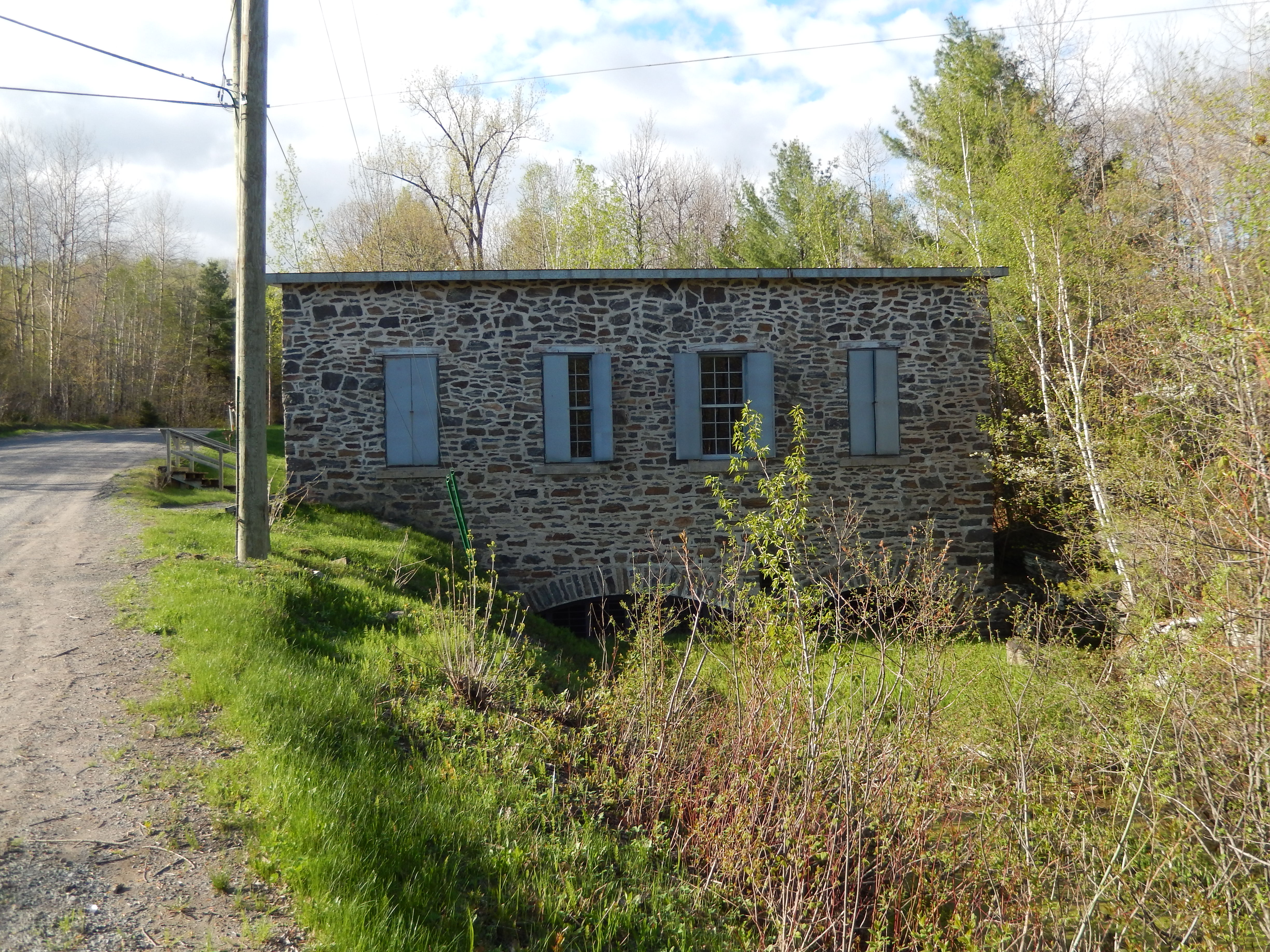
- Annex to the old Saint-Narcisse power station
- Interactive map of Former Saint-Narcisse Power Station
- Country: Canada, Quebec
- Location: Mauricie, Saint-Narcisse and Sainte-Geneviève-de-Batiscan
- Construction began: 1897
- Owner: North Shore Power Company

Dam and spillways
- Type of dam: Immeuble patrimonial classé (1964, barrage, bâtiments, terrain, # 92673); Immeuble patrimonial classé (1963, annexe, # 110509)

The Old power station of Saint-Narcisse is a former hydroelectric power station which was in operation from 1897 to 1928 located on the Batiscan River in Saint-Narcisse. It was built by the company North Shore Power in order to light the streets of Trois-Rivières. Its construction also required the construction of the first high voltage line in Canada. It was replaced in 1928 by the Saint-Narcisse power station and today only the dam, the annex to the power station built in 1904, and the water pipes remain. It was classified heritage building in 1963. The annex was also classified the same year.

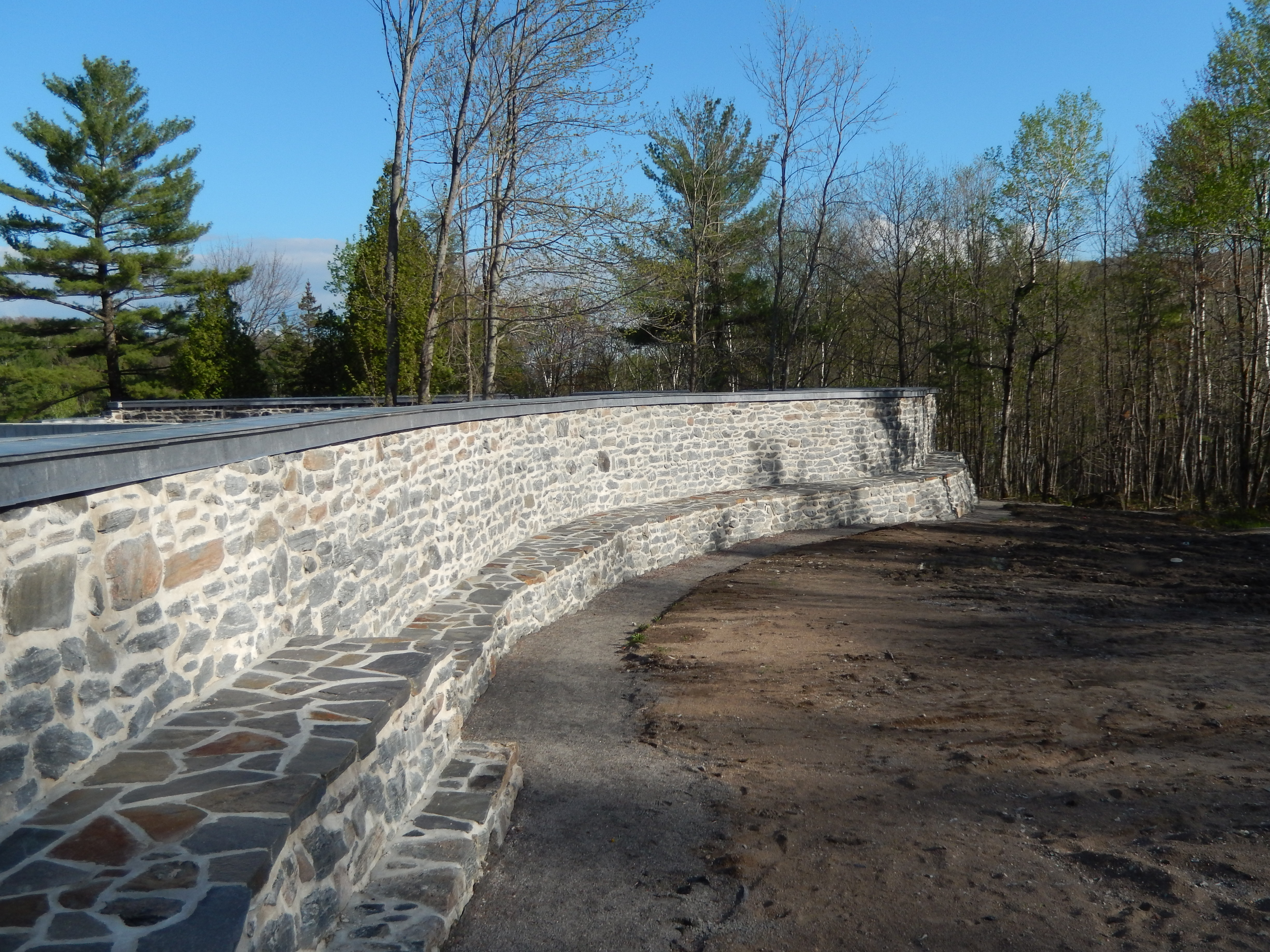
Dam
