= Batiscan, Quebec =

Batiscan
- Municipality
- Motto(s): Fais bien ce que tu fais ("Do Well What You Do")
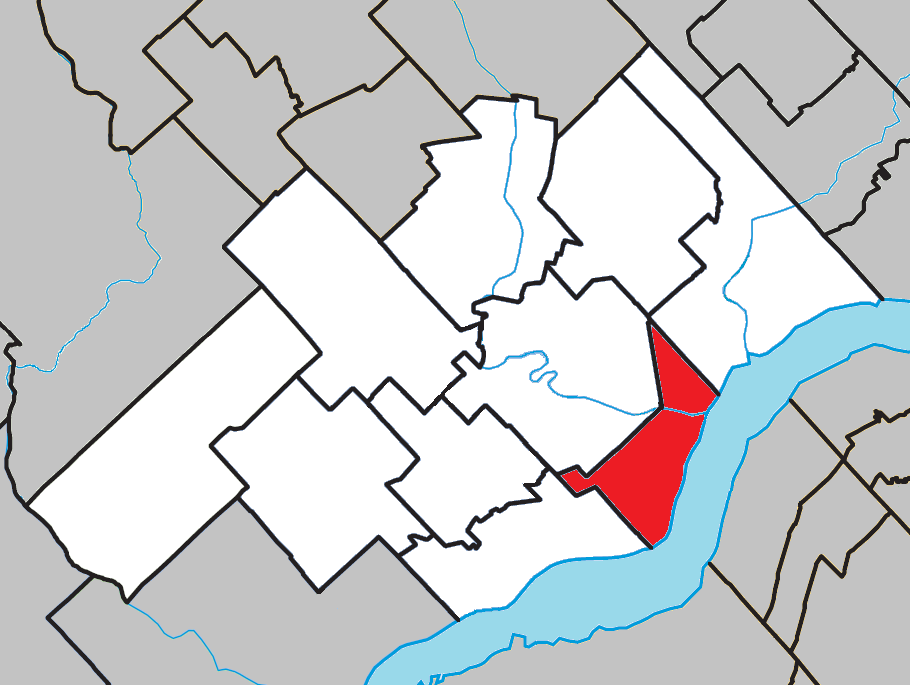
- Location within Les Chenaux RCM

- Location in central Quebec
- Coordinates: 46°30′N 72°15′W
- Country: Canada
- Province: Quebec
- Region: Mauricie
- RCM: Les Chenaux
- Settled: 1666
- Constituted: July 1, 1855

Government
  - Mayor: Alain Bouffard
  - Federal riding: Saint-Maurice—Champlain
  - Prov. riding: Champlain

Area
  - Total: 58.74 km^{2} (22.68 sq mi)
  - Land: 43.23 km^{2} (16.69 sq mi)

Population (2021)
  - Total: 958
  - Density: 22.2/km^{2} (57/sq mi)
  - Pop (2016-21): ▲6.1%
  - Dwellings: 545
- Time zone: UTC−5 (EST)
  - Summer (DST): UTC−4 (EDT)
- Postal code(s): G0X 1A0
- Area codes: 418 and 581
- Highways A-40: R-138 R-361
- GNBC Code: ELIDL
- NTS Map: 031I08
- Website: batiscan.ca

Batiscan (French pronunciation: [batiskɑ̃]) is a municipality in the Mauricie region of the province of Quebec in Canada. It is located along the St Lawrence River at the mouth of the Batiscan River.

The usage includes Batiscan in Batiscanie, the common name for the region.

== History ==
In 1609, Samuel de Champlain, on his way to Lake Champlain, wrote of a Huron and Algonquin encampment one and a half leagues from St. Mary's River, which places it around the modern settlement of Batiscan. A year later, he wrote of having met an indigenous leader called "Batiscan". On his map of 1612, Champlain designated this area north of the Saint Lawrence River as the "region of bastisquan". While the name has virtually remained unchanged since first mentioned by Champlain, its meaning has remained uncertain, possibly meaning mist or haze (as often seen at the mouth of the Batiscan River), pulverized dried meat, rushes, or even making a mistake, taking a misstep.

In 1636, the Madeleine Seignory was granted to Jacques Laferté, and included all the territory between the Chevrotière and Saint-Maurice Rivers, until 100 kilometers inland from the Saint Lawrence River. Subsequently, the seignory was divided into several smaller estates or fiefs, including the Batiscan Fiefdom that on March 13, 1639, was given to the Jesuits to accommodate the evangelization and the settlement of Indian tribes living there. This territory corresponded approximately to the current municipalities of Batiscan and Saint-Geneviève-de-Batiscan.

The actual colonization of the area began in 1666, and it developed according to the seigneurial system of New France. The land granted to each settler was typically a long narrow rectangle with a proportion of about 1 to 10, that would allow each settler access to the river and the road. By 1709, all land bordering the Saint Lawrence River was occupied and a second row was equally divided inland. Over time, the territory of Batiscan grew to have 3 rows south-west of the Batiscan River and 2 rows north-east of it.

Settlers would cultivate a portion of their land, but because of outdated farming techniques, isolation from markets, and lack of roads, agriculture remained a challenge. But with the Batiscan River providing access to the interior and the trading post at Trois-Rivières providing market access, people from Batiscan turned to trapping for survival. Logging also provided opportunities and several sawmills appeared along the rivers flowing through the area.

On November 2, 1684, the Parish of Saint-François-Xavier-de-Batiscan was formed, named by the Jesuits after one of the co-founders of their order, Francis Xavier. The community itself developed as a linear village, stretching along the Chemin du Roy and without any real village centre, exceeding even the administrative boundaries of cadastral parishes. By the end of the French Era, the towns of Champlain, Batiscan, and Sainte-Anne-de-la-Pérade were all connected by a long ribbon of buildings.

After 1712, Batiscan was one of the places in which French settlers enslaved Fox Indians of Wisconsin.

In 1845, the Parish Municipality of Saint-François-Xavier-de-Batiscan was formed. It was abolished a few years later but reestablished on July 1, 1855.

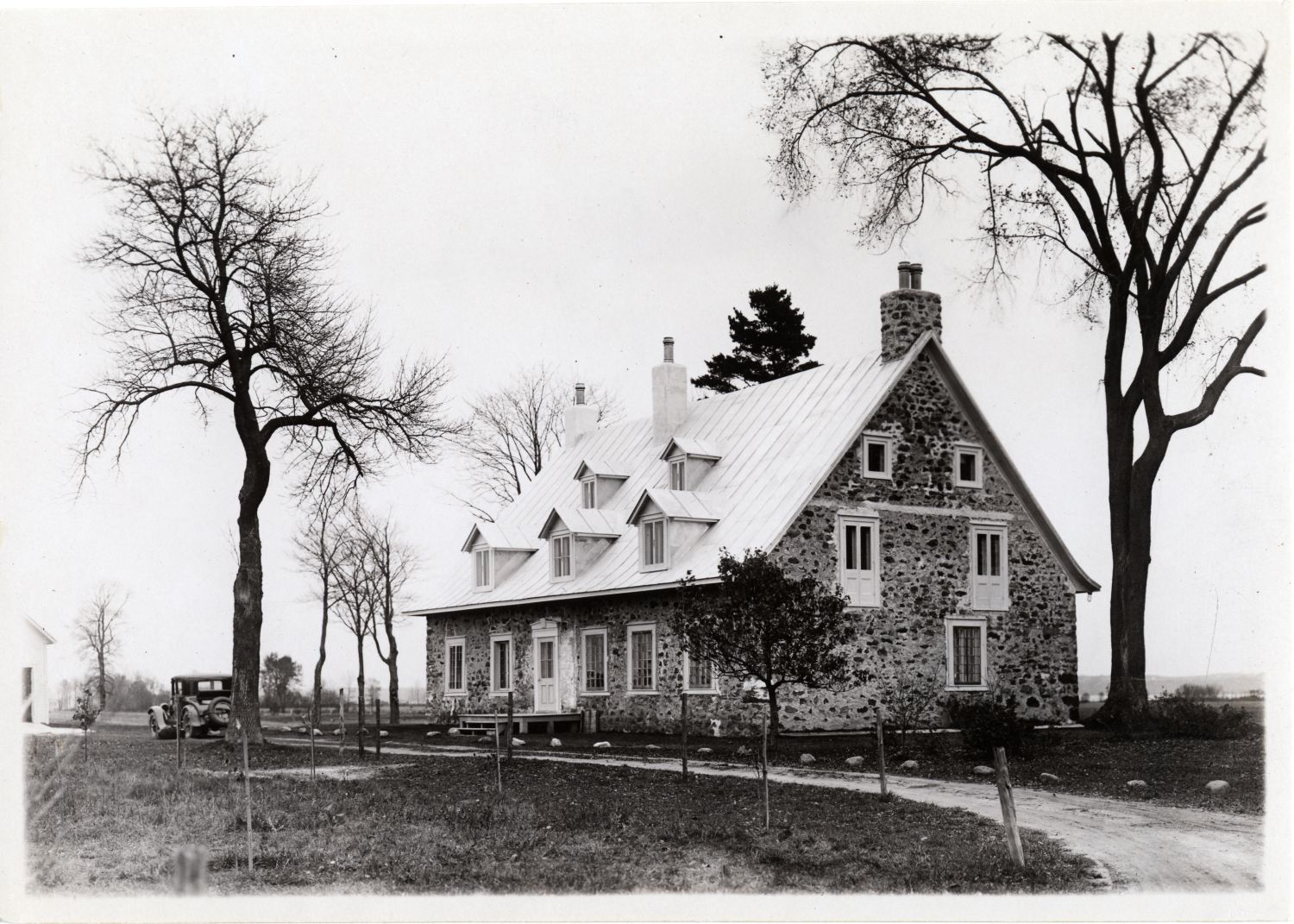
Heritage site of the Old Presbytery of Batiscan, circa 1926

The industrial revolution led to economic development and a small port on the river and the railroad were built. At the Batiscan station, a new small village centre grew. But the economic crisis of 1929 broke the momentum of the Station Village and gradually agriculture reclaimed primary place in the landscape and economy of Batiscan, with commercial and industrial activities remaining marginal.

Because of its proximity to the regional hub of Trois-Rivières, the growing use of cars, and the improved road network, Batiscan is becoming a suburban community, leading to increased urbanization of the Saint Lawrence shore.

In 1986, the Parish Municipality of Saint-François-Xavier-de-Batiscan became the Municipality of Batiscan. On December 31, 2001, it was transferred from the Francheville Regional County to the new Les Chenaux Regional County, following the creation of the new City of Trois-Rivières and the dissolution of the Francheville RCM.

The Geographical Evolution of Colonization. Because of its early and intensive development, Batiscan was already the largest Lordship in the Trois-Rivières area by the end of the seventeenth century. The shores of the St. Lawrence River were already occupied, pioneers were moving inland along the Batiscan River.

== Geography ==
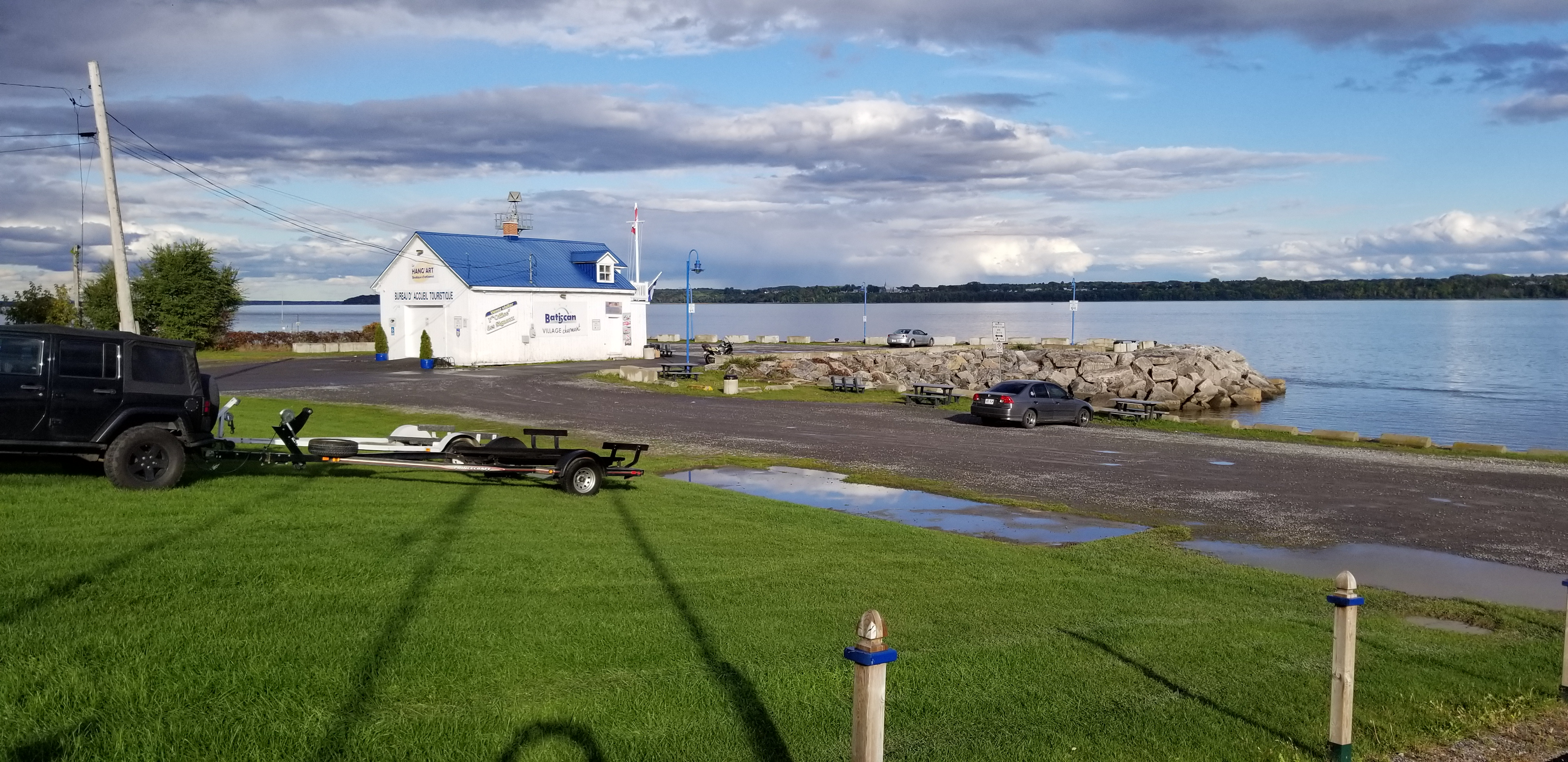
Parking, Hangar de Batiscan

The community of Batiscan is located on the north shore of the St. Lawrence River. Part of its territory drains directly into the St. Lawrence River. The territory of the Lordship of Batiscan is part of the major units of relief that structure the Quebec space.

To the interior lies the fairly flat plain of the St. Lawrence Lowlands. This plain was covered by glacial sediments during the Last Glacial Period (Pleistocene) and by marine and fluvial deposits (clay/sand) with the invasion of the Champlain Sea. This flat landform unit was used for the first settlements in Batiscanie. Up to the foothills of the Laurentians, the place offers: proximity to the rivers, smooth terrain and fertile soils.

The Batiscan territory is linked to "the continental climate with cold winters" where a long, harsh and snowy winter dominates. From November to April, snow covers the ground and the waterways are frozen. In 1661, Pierre Boucher (1622-1717), French explorer and Governor of New France, wrote to King Louis XIV of France: The severity of winter forced the pioner on the shores of the St. Lawrence, "to hide in his home (chaumière)".

== Demographics ==
Historical census populations – Batiscan, Quebec

Year	Pop.	±%
1861	1,004	—
1871	1,036	+3.2%
1881	1,141	+10.1%
1891	996	−12.7%
1901	1,173	+17.8%
1911	1,280	+9.1%
1921	1,397	+9.1%
1931	1,351	−3.3%

Year	Pop.	±%
1941	1,212	−10.3%
1951	1,071	−11.6%
1956	1,208	+12.8%
1961	1,197	−0.9%
1966	1,166	−2.6%
1971	1,083	−7.1%
1976	996	−8.0%
1981	961	−3.5%

Year	Pop.	±%
1986	876	−8.8%
1991	869	−0.8%
1996	891	+2.5%
2001	905	+1.6%
2006	949	+4.9%
2011	940	−0.9%
2016	903	−3.9%
2021	958	+6.1%

Source: Statistics Canada

Private dwellings occupied by usual residents (2021): 476 (total dwellings: 545)

Mother tongue (2021):

- English as first language: 0.5%
- French as first language: 97.9%
- English and French as first language: 1.0%
- Other as first language: 1.0%

== See also ==
- Batiscanie
