= Radnor Township, Quebec =

Coordinates: 46°45′N 72°50′W

Radnor Township is located in the administrative region of Mauricie, in the province of Quebec, in Canada. Today, the administration of this territory is under the city of Shawinigan and Mekinac Regional County Municipality (RCM). Rectangular, the Canton is about 5 km wide and 38 km deep, oriented northwest to southeast. The central part of the township is in La Mauricie National Park, on the west bank of the Saint-Maurice River which cuts diagonally this township. The southeastern part of the township includes the municipalities of Saint-Jean-des-Piles, Grandes-Piles, Saint-Roch-de-Mékinac, sector Lac-à-la-Tortue (grouped since 2001 in the city of Shawinigan) and Garneau railway junction (located northeast of Grand-Mère).

The northwestern part of the township has a relatively rugged terrain, while the land south-east (east of the Saint-Maurice River) is a rather flat plateau and has some marshy areas.

The inventory of 1814 of the assets of the Company Forges de Batiscan, refers to the Township of Radnor, which was proclaimed as a Canton on February 3, 1855, by the Government of Quebec. This territorial designation continued to be used by the owners of Radnor Forges, who operated a foundry from 1854 to 1911, in the industrial town of Fermont. Now abandoned and located north of Saint-Maurice, this village became a locality named "Radnor des Forges". The name is inspired by the forests and mountainous landscape of Radnorshire, located in the centre of Wales in the United Kingdom.

The name "Radnor Township" was officially registered on December 5, 1968, at the Bank of place names of Quebec, of the Commission de toponymie du Québec.

The "First row Radnor" (Premier rang de Radnor) is located at the northwest end of Saint-Naricsse, on the edge of the Lac-à-la-Tortue area and comprises 17 lots.
