= Quebec Route 361 =

Highway in Quebec, Canada

Route 361

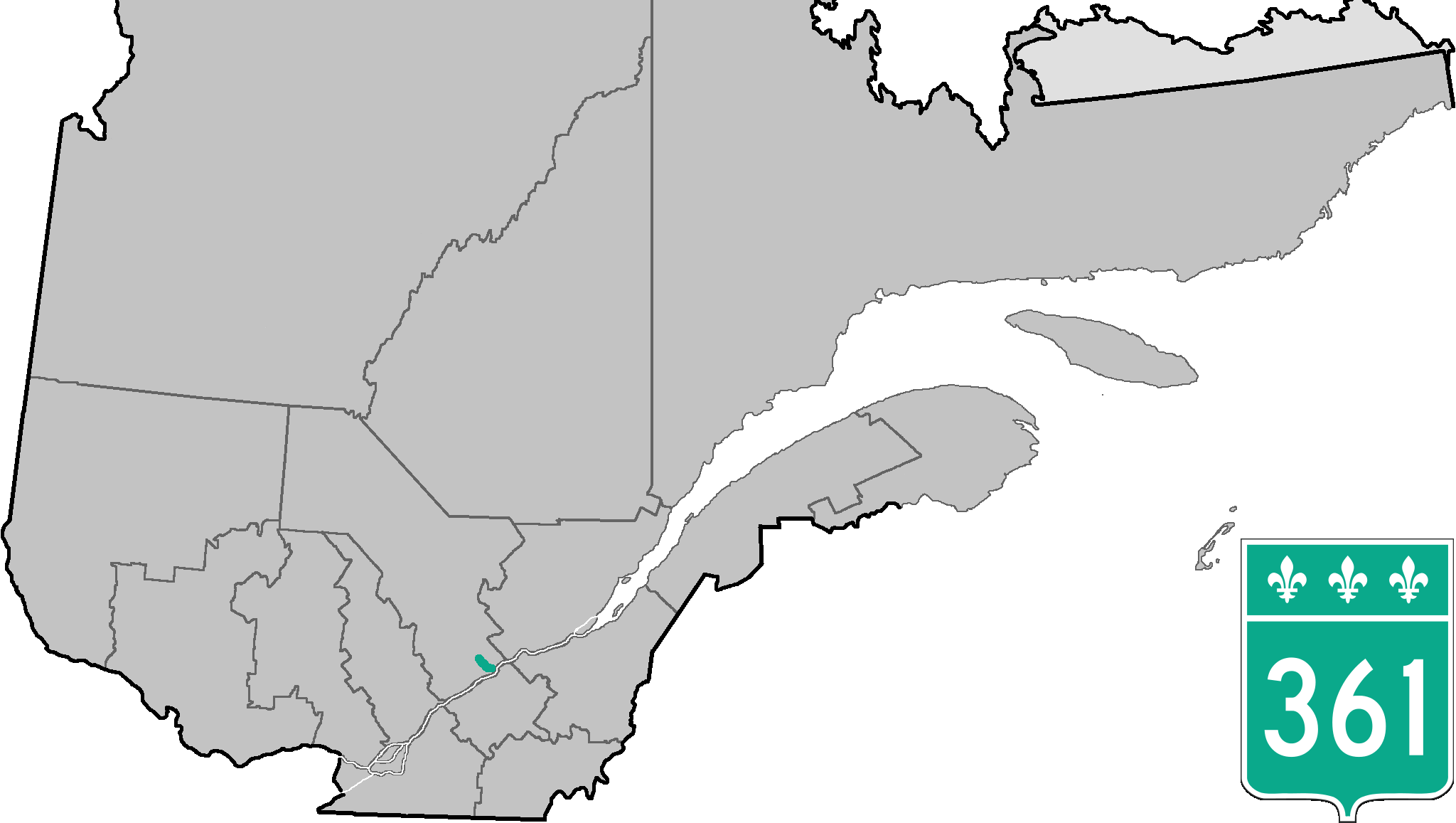

Route information
- Maintained by Transports Québec and the municipalities of Sainte-Geneviève-de-Batiscan and Saint-Narcisse
- Length: 20.3 km (12.6 mi)

Major junctions
- South end: R-138 in Batiscan
- A-40 near Sainte-Genevieve de Batiscan
- North end: R-352 in Saint-Narcisse

Location
- Country: Canada
- Province: Quebec

Highway system
- Quebec provincial highways; Autoroutes; List; Former
← R-360	→ R-362

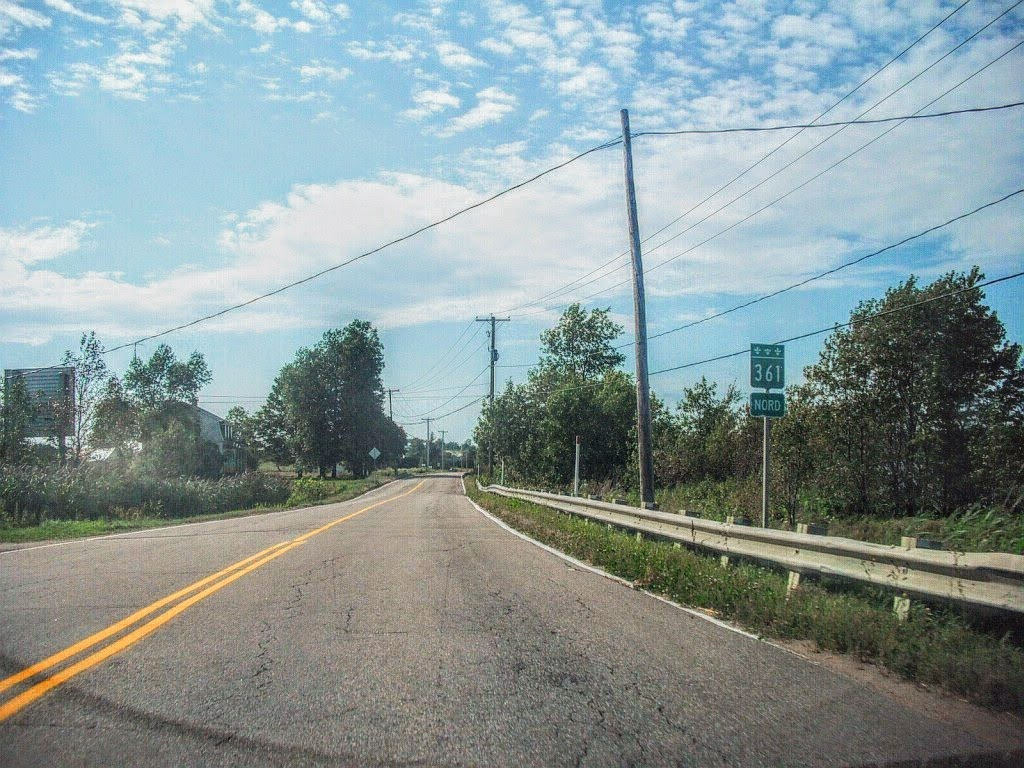
Route 361 at Ste-Geneviève-de-Batiscan

Route 361 is a 20 km north–south regional road in Quebec, Canada, linking Batiscan and St-Narcisse, following the Batiscan river until Ste-Geneviève-de-Batiscan, the only village it goes through.

This road connects with Autoroute 40 at exit 229.

== Municipalities along Route 361 ==
- Batiscan
- Sainte-Genevieve-de-Batiscan
- Saint-Narcisse

== Major intersections ==
RCM or ET	Municipality	Km	Road	Notes
Les Chenaux	Batiscan	0.0	R-138	
Les Chenaux	Sainte-Geneviève-de-Batiscan	4.1	A-40	
Les Chenaux	Sainte-Geneviève-de-Batiscan	8.0	Rue du Pont	To Sainte-Geneviève-de-Batiscan
Les Chenaux	Saint-Narcisse	20.3	R-352	

== See also ==
- List of Quebec provincial highways
