= Lac-à-la-Tortue =

Sector in Shawinigan, Quebec, Canada

Lac-à-la-Tortue (Turtle lake)
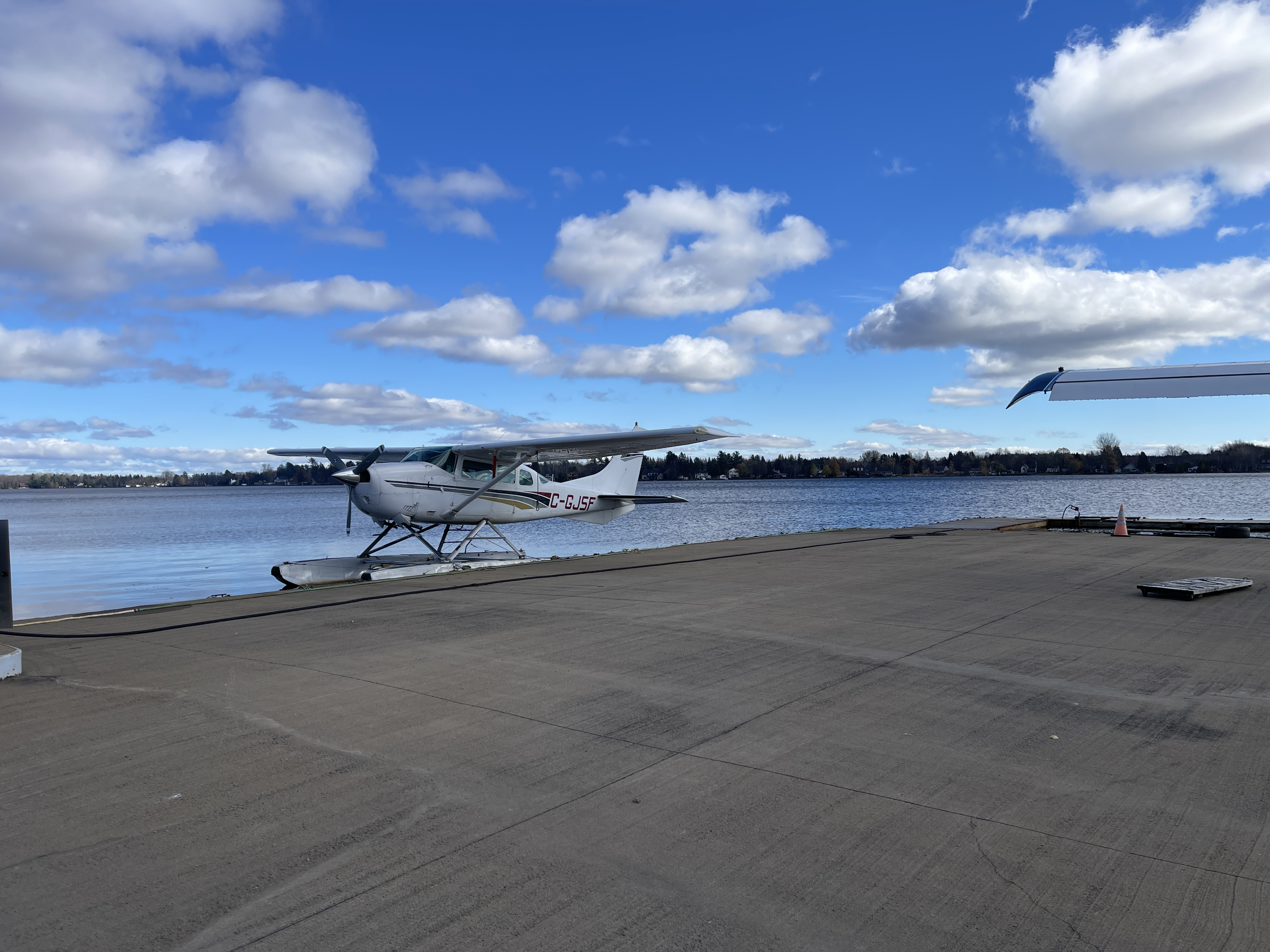
- Turtle Lake, seaplane docked, Chemin de la Vigilance

- Location within Quebec
- Location: Quebec
- Coordinates: 46°37′08″N 72°37′06″W
- Type: Natural
- Primary outflows: Rivière la Tortue (Turtle river)
- Basin countries: Canada
- Max. length: 3.4 km (2.1 mi)
- Max. width: 1.7 km (1 mi)
- Settlements: Lac-à-la-Tortue, Quebec, sector of Shawinigan; Hérouxville, Quebec

Lac-à-la-Tortue (French pronunciation: [lak a la tɔʁty]) is a sector of the city of Shawinigan since 2002. It is located in Mauricie, Quebec, Canada.
The use includes the Lac-à-la-Tortue sector in Batiscanie, the common name for the watershed of the Batiscan River.
Considered the cradle of commercial bush flying in Canada, the Lac-à-la-Tortue sector is home to the oldest civilian seaplane base in Canada.
Since the twentieth century, the area has been a well-known resort.

== Geography ==
Despite its proximity to the Saint-Maurice River (only three km at the closest), the lake is part of the Batiscanie watershed. The discharge of the lake flows north into the Rivière La Tortue (Turtle River), who joined the Rivière des Envies (Cravings River) in Saint-Stanislas. This lake is the oldest civil seaplane base in Canada and since the 20th century has been a well known resort.

=== Ecological reserve ===
Lac-à-la-Tortue sector has the largest peat lowlands of the St. Lawrence basin. This ecological reserve with a total area of 565.69 hectares is located approximately six kilometres south of Grand-Mère. This protected area is part of two municipal areas of Shawinigan: Lac-à-la-Tortue and Shawinigan-Sud. The ecological reserve protects a bog characteristic of the region lowlands of the St. Lawrence, west style.

This ecological reserve of Lac-à-la-Tortue is divided into two lobes. The eastern lobe extends over 11 kilometre north-south direction between Lac-à-la-Tortue and Troptôtchaud lake, while the western section extends from Lake Troptôtchaud until rang Saint-Mathieu to the northwest. The ecological reserve includes part of western lobe. This protected area attracts many nature observers.

=== Wetland on south-east ===
A sector of wetland covering three municipalities, is located south-east of Lac-à-la-Tortue, head of water between the watershed of Lac-à-la-Tortue (including the outlet of Lake Atocas), the rivière à la Tortue and River of the Falls (Rivière des Chutes):

1. Row "Cote Saint-Pierre Coté Sud-Ouest", a few lands in southeast of Hérouxville and a dozen lands of Saint-Narcisse;
2. Row "Cote Saint-Pierre Coté Northeast" in Saint-Narcisse, a few limited and isolated wetlands covering about 14 lots (near the road linking the 94th street of Lac-à-la-Tortue and the 3rd row road of Saint-Narcisse);
3. Row X 's in Hérouxville, some isolated areas at the southeast of the row, spread on eight lots;
4. Row IX Lac-à-la-Tortue in Radnor Township, three lots (near the limit of Hérouxville);
5. Forefront of Radnor in Saint-Narcisse, north-east of the row, is the head area of the River of the Falls.

== History ==
Lac-à-la-Tortue sector takes its toponymic origin of the lake of the same name. L. Turtle for the lake appear on a map entitled Plan of the St-Maurice Territory.'

== Aviation ==
In June 1919, fires ravaged Quebec's forests. To detect fires before they get out of control, the Laurentide Pulp and Paper paper mill in Grand-Mère (Shawinigan Sector) is considering using the aircraft for forest patrols. To this end, the Canadian government acquired two Curtiss HS-2L flying boats from the U.S. Navy, originally designed for anti-submarine patrol. The Curtiss HS-2L was a kind of open-cockpit flying boat, one of two aircraft (named The Vigilance) took off from Halifax Nova Scotia on June 5, 1919, piloted by Stuart Graham (1896–1976). The floatplane landed at Lac-à-la-Tortue three days later.

The decision to allow the crew to land on Turtle Lake was made by Robert F. Grant, president of the Saint-Maurice Forest Protective Association. Turtle Lake was a perfect landing place, the shores are clear of mountains and at the time, the Laurentide Pulp mill used the Saint-Maurice River for timber rafting.

Since 2005, the Turtle Lake seaplane base has been listed as a Historic Site of Canada by Parks Canada and the Historic Sites and Monuments Board of Canada (Parks Canada 2012). Today, the Turtle Lake base is considered the birthplace of commercial aviation in Canada, as well as the world's cradle of bush flying.

== Lake ownership ==
Although water management in Canada is a provincial nature, Lac-à-la-Tortue is a rare exception in the country. The lake is owned by the city of Shawinigan since the merger in 2002 since the lake was owned by the former municipality of Lac-à-la-Tortue.

In the past, the first concession of Lac-à-la-Tortue was given as of January 10, 1879 to Mary Hall, wife of G.B. Hall, president of the company of the same name. The latter decided to sell it to the parish priest Caron of Saint-Maurice. In 1934, the body of water is sold to the Consolidated paper, which resells it as of November 27, 1943 at Canadian Pacific Air Lines (CPAL) for $1000. In 1920, the City Council took steps to acquire the lake to develop tourism. In 1967, after discussions with CPAL, an agreement is reached and the small municipality buys "his" lake for $1500. In 1970, the city council decided to seed muskellunge in the lake. Over time, these fish have become particularly large, but more rare.

== Parish history ==
The beginning of the religious history of the municipality is the 1880. At that time, the mission has not his own priest. The priest from the mother parish comes to celebrate mass on Sundays and feast days in the station. During one of his visits to the mission, Bishop Louis-François Richer Laflèche was surprised to find a small altar in the station. At that time, he said it was time to build a chapel. It was built in 1890 near the present church.

As of December 21, 1894, Louis-François Richer Laflèche sign the decree establishing the parish from a dismembered part of the parishes of Notre-Dame-du-Mont-Carmel, Quebec (Our Lady of Mount Carmel) and Saint-Jacques des Piles. The name chosen for the new parish is that of Saint-Théophile in honor of the first pastor was being made in the old mission, Théophile De Carufel, pastor of the mother church of the time.

== The church ==
The chapel was considered too small, as of January 20, 1898, a decree was issued by Bishop Lafleche who ordered that a church be built in the parish of Saint-Théophile. Construction began when the construction contract is awarded, on February 10, 1898, so that the whole is finished in time for the Christmas mass which was celebrated in the same year. As of October 12, 1898, the chapel was sold at auction, but it served the cult several months until the opening of the new church. During the demolition of the chapel, the tower was sold to a parishioner who used it as a smokehouse ham. Although today the church is brick, during its construction, the structure was built of wood. The walls were briquetted during renovations from 1930 to 1933 for the front and the rest of the church and sacristy in 1957.

== The presbytery ==
Since Bishop Lafleche had ordered the construction of the church, it was also decided to build a parsonage. It still stands in its original location, but had a somewhat different aspect. The building, like the church, was built of wood and had only one floor. The second floor was added during renovations in 1906. The brickwork was completed in 1963.

== The convent and schools ==
August 23, 1908 marks the arrival of the first nuns in the parish that was given the task to teach to the youth of the parish. At this time, the class was made in a house near the present Notre-Dame School. In 1915, the first convent was built on the site of the present school. The hotel quickly became overloaded, the construction of a college proved essential, it was made in 1960. The building is still visible today. Now, there is also the Jacques-Cartier school for 5e and 6e year.

== Mine ==
The history of the mine begins 20 years after the onset of the first forging Mauricie or in 1879. All deposits in the region had been exhausted. The industry was in crisis and on the verge of bankruptcy. Hope is reborn when ore was discovered on the banks and bottom of Turtle Lake. The largest ore deposits are found in the Bay of Maskinongé. At first, the extraction of iron was done with shovels in the shallow parts. To extract the ore in the deepest places, the company produces a Hall dredge operated with steam. The dredge could collect the ore to a depth of four meters.

== Railway ==
The ore extracted from "Lac-à-la-Tortue" (Lake to the Turtle) was used to make various objects in the forges of the region, particularly in Forges du Saint-Maurice. The most important is the vast majority of the wheels of the transcontinental railroad that Prime Minister of Canada, John Alexander MacDonald had decreed the construction. The second use is the production of poles for use in the daily lives of people of the time. The exploitation of iron ore in the bottom of the lake ends in 1910 with the closure of the Company Foundries Ltd. Canada, which operated the mine.

The railway in Lac-à-la-Tortue stood at the current location where there is the pipeline of Gaz Métropolitain buried. In 1990, a bike path is built on the soil over the pipeline.

The railway Lac-à-la-Tortue is an extension of the main railroad, which was built in 1879. Before its extension into the heart of the village in 1880, the iron ore extracted from the lake had to be transported by wheelbarrow to the railway which was existing before being transported to the Radnor Forges of Saint-Maurice, Quebec. In 1880, along with the advent of the railway in the parish, a small station was built.

With the closure of the iron mine in 1910, the company CP Air constantly ask permission to stop providing services to the station Lac-à-la-Tortue. Successive city councils then undertake a fight with the company to maintain the best possible services. In 1914, CP Air demand the closure of the station that is no longer profitable. It is rejected, but the company returned to the charge in 1921. The station master is replaced by a station agent. In 1928, the station is the last building in the village to be electrified. This was done after the city council had ordered the company. In 1948, the station agent was in turn replaced by a guard officer. The company continues in these approaches and tries to prove that the station is no longer profitable. 28 years after she decided to close the station without success, or in 1952, it continues to sell tickets and agent-guard is replaced by a single guard. In 1962, the station is destroyed. The railway is still in use for freight until 1980, where the rails are removed. The company Gaz Métropolitain installs its pipeline in 1983. Today, the land is owned by the city of Shawinigan.

== Photos ==
Shawinigan (City), Turtle Lake Sector

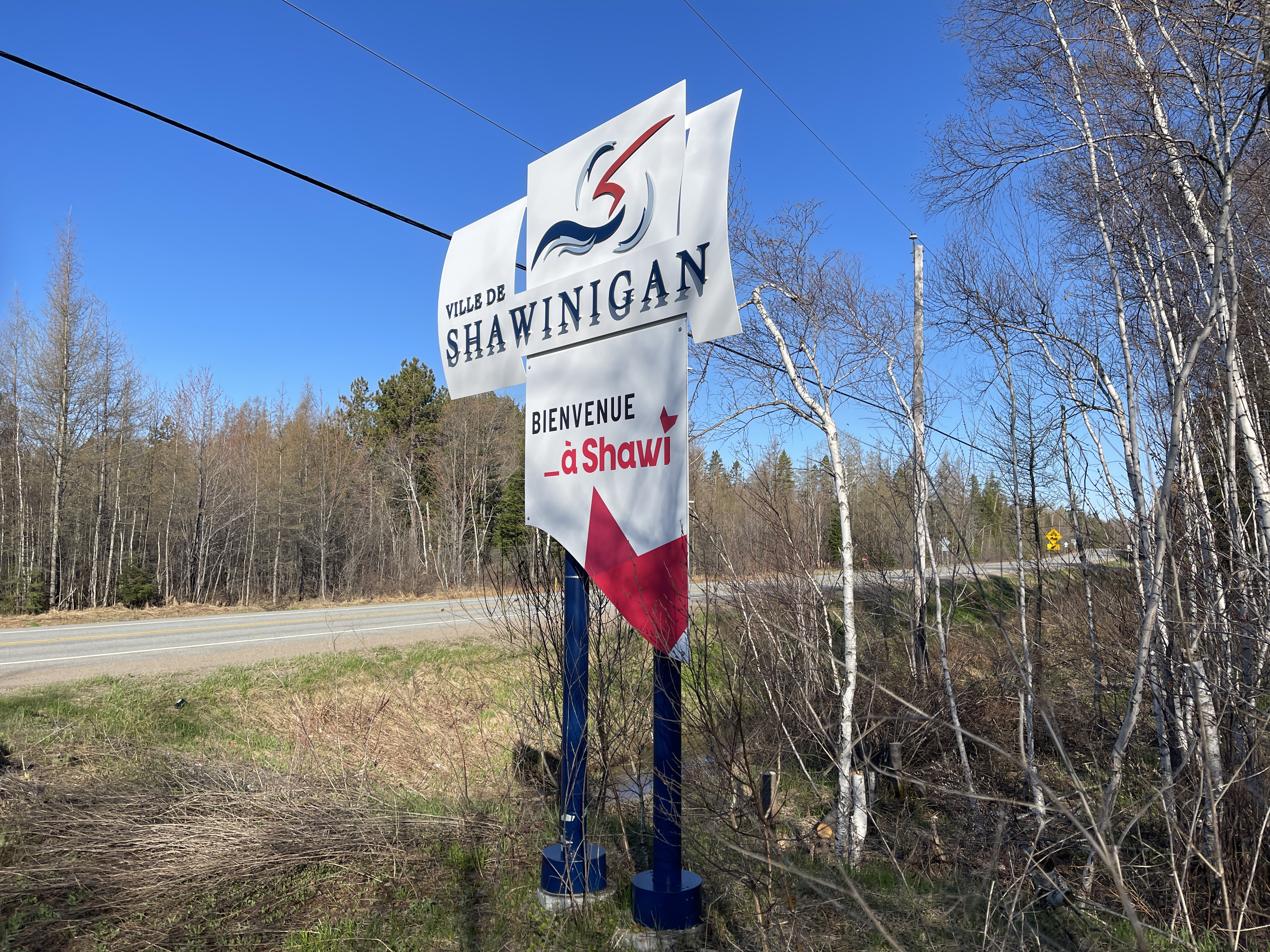
City of Shawinigan sign, route 359

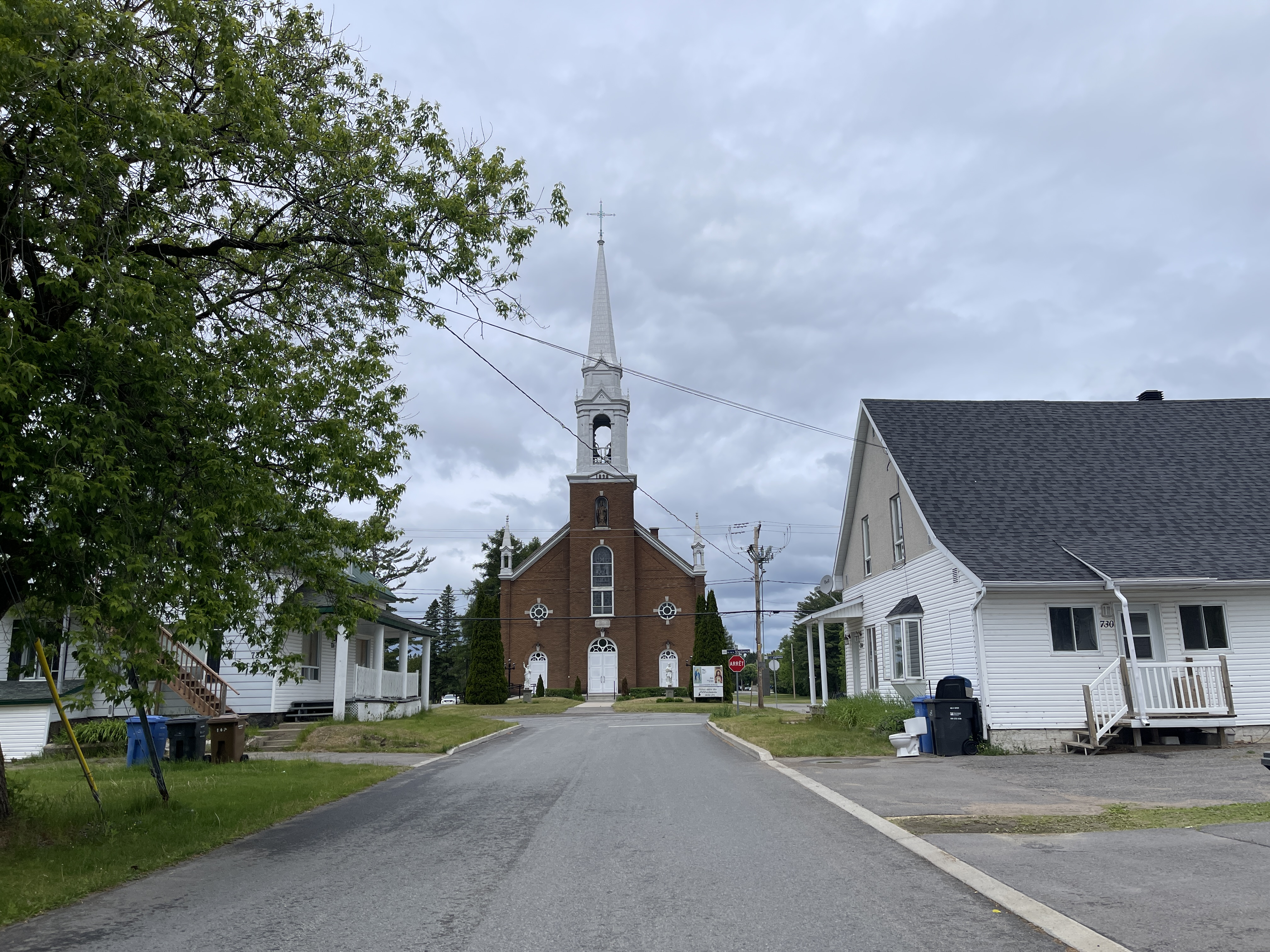
Parish Church of Saint-Théophile, Chemin de la Vigilance

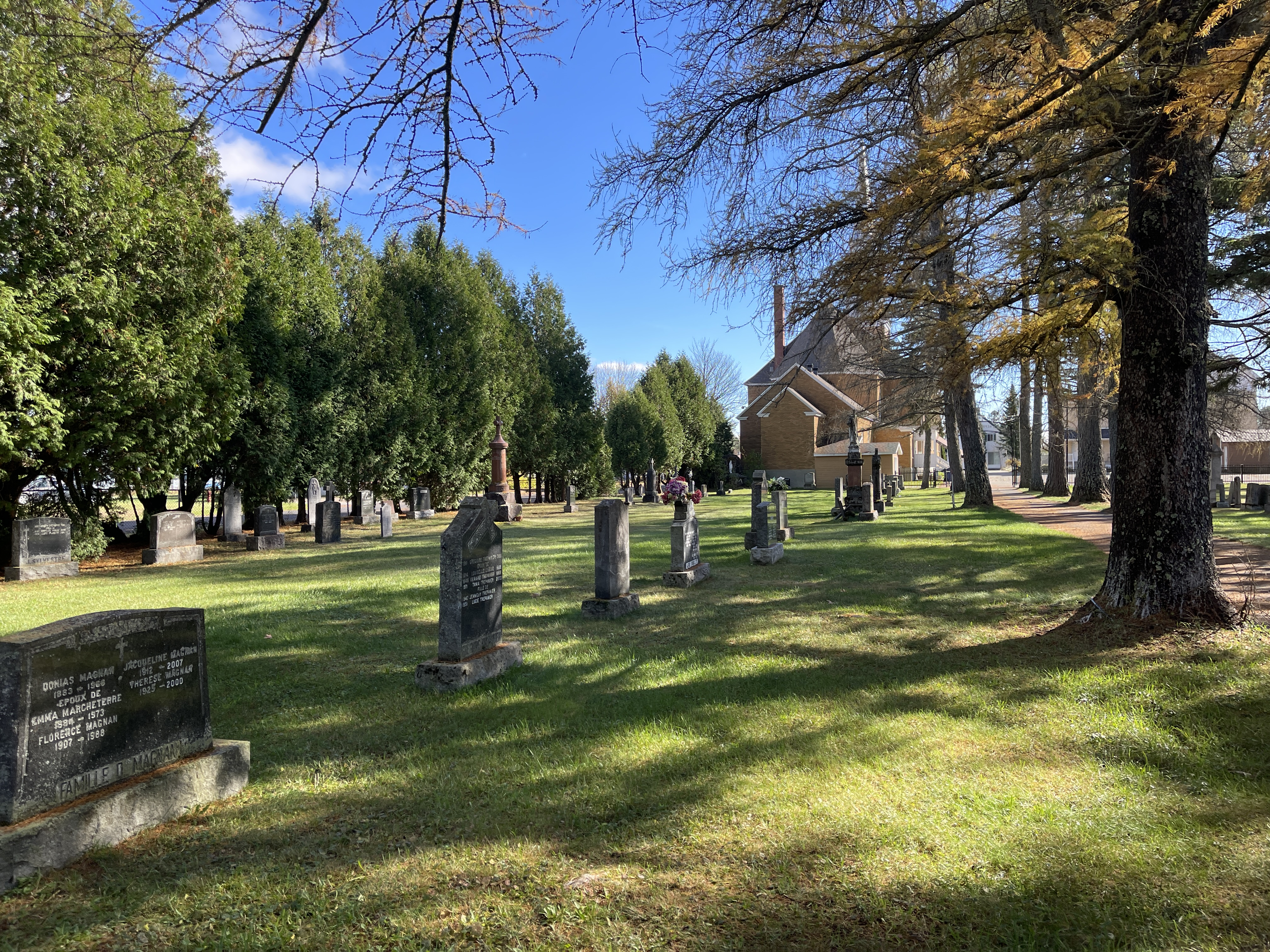
Cemetery and church of the parish of Saint-Théophile, chemin de la Vigilance

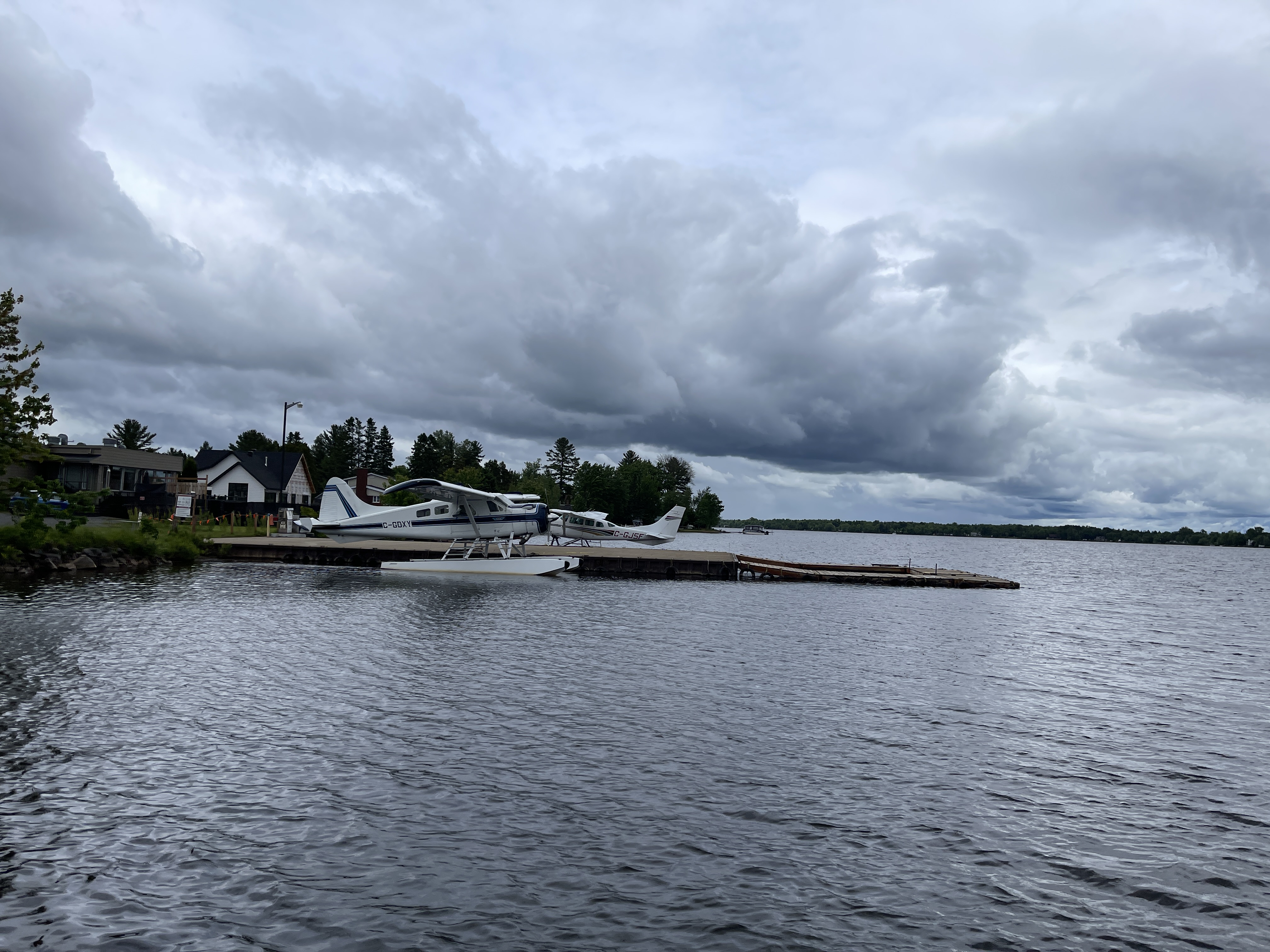
Seaplanes at private docks, Chemin de la vigilance

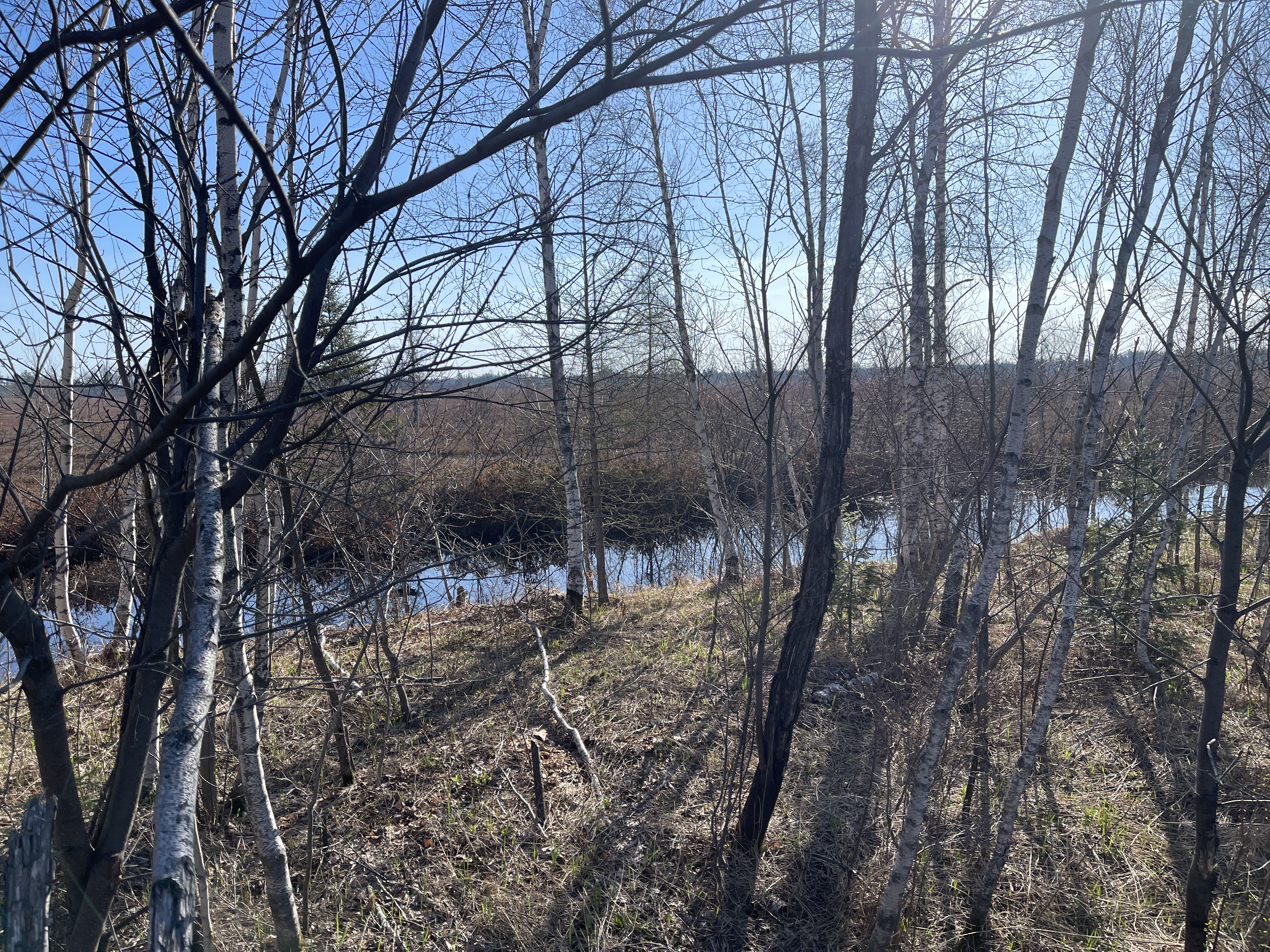
Lac-à-la-Tortue Bog, Route 359 (Lac-à-la-Tortue Road)
Turtle Lake

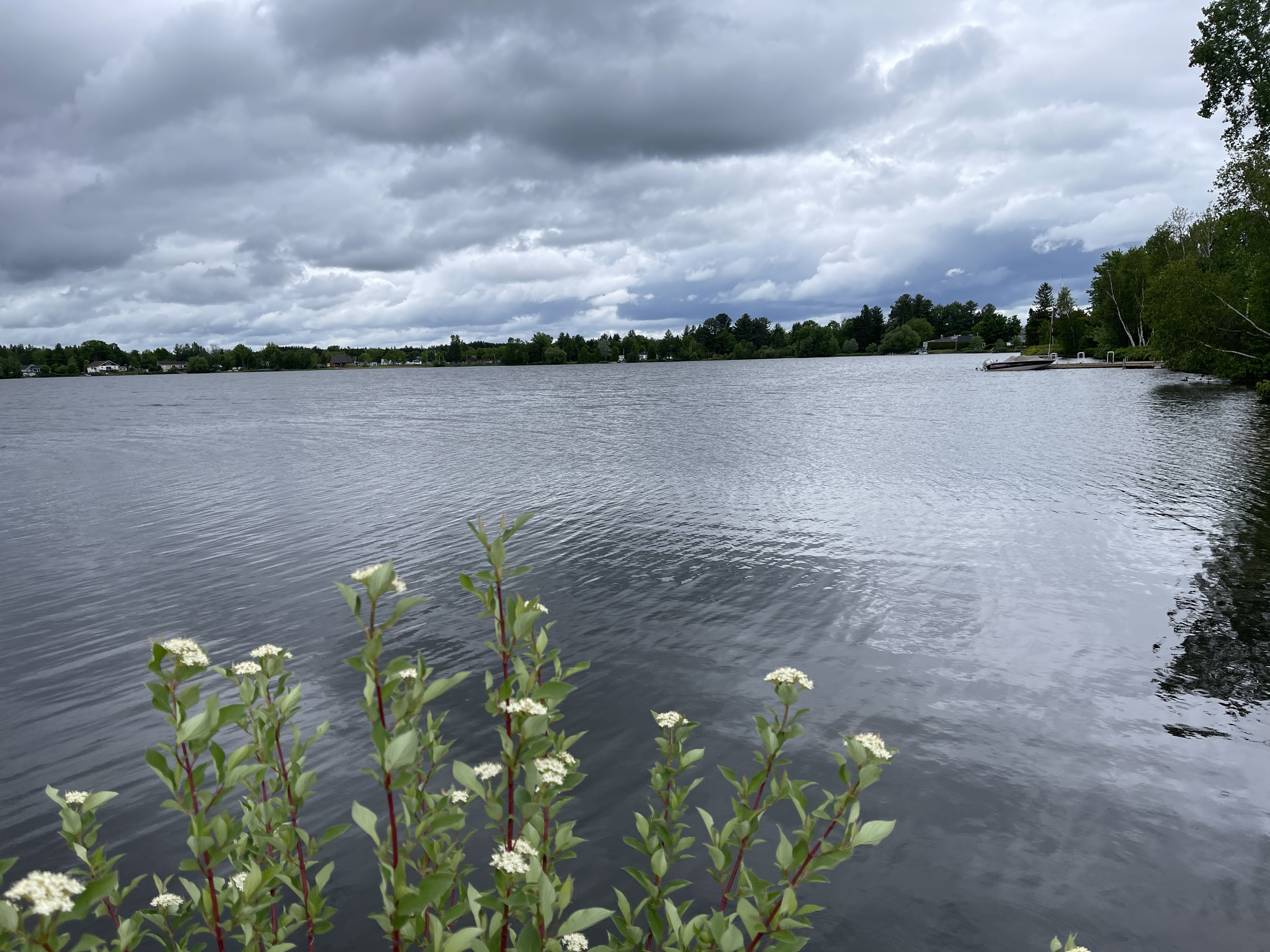
Riparian Strip, Chemin de la Vigilance

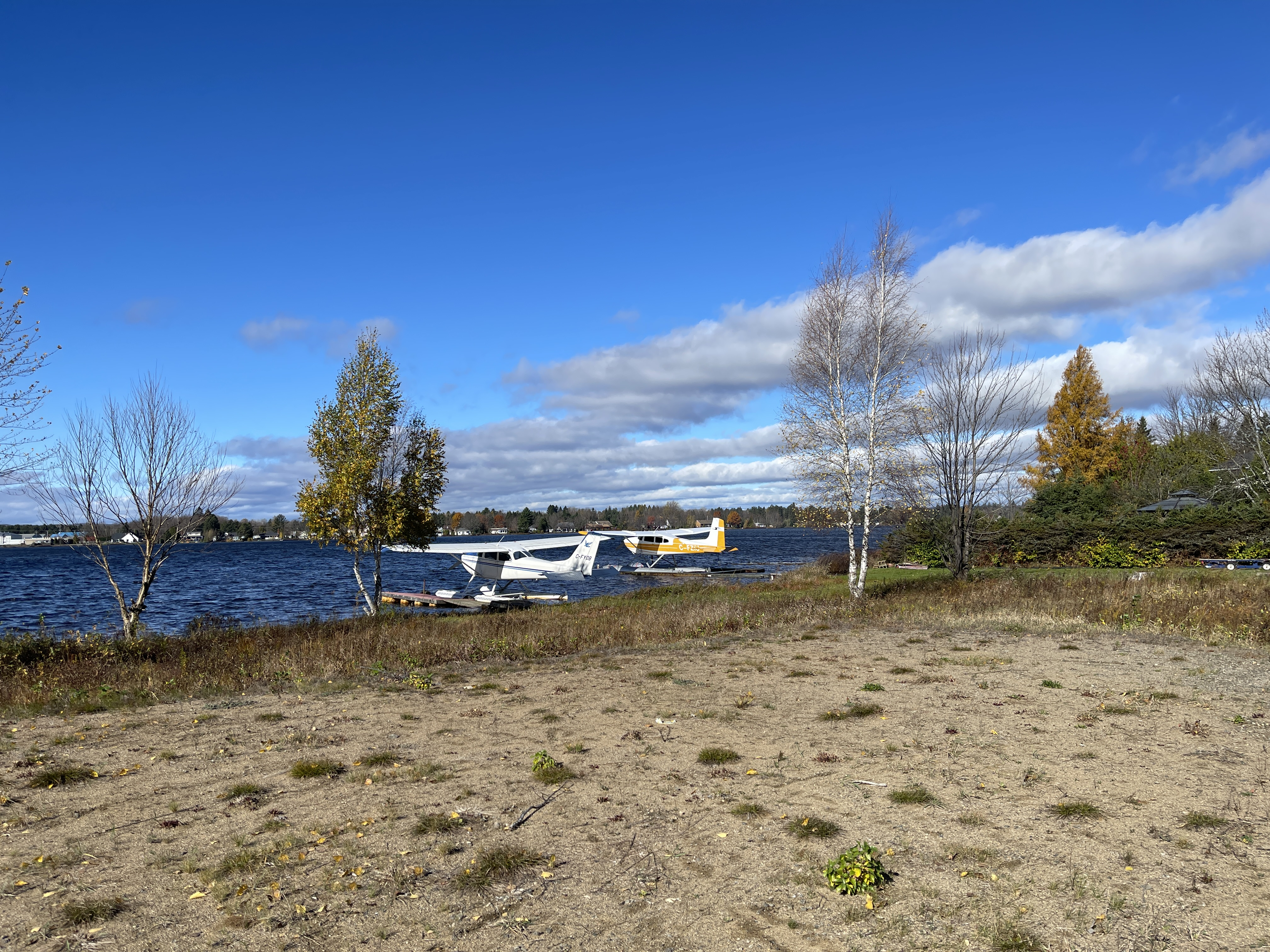
Shorelines and residences, Avenue du Tour-du-Lac

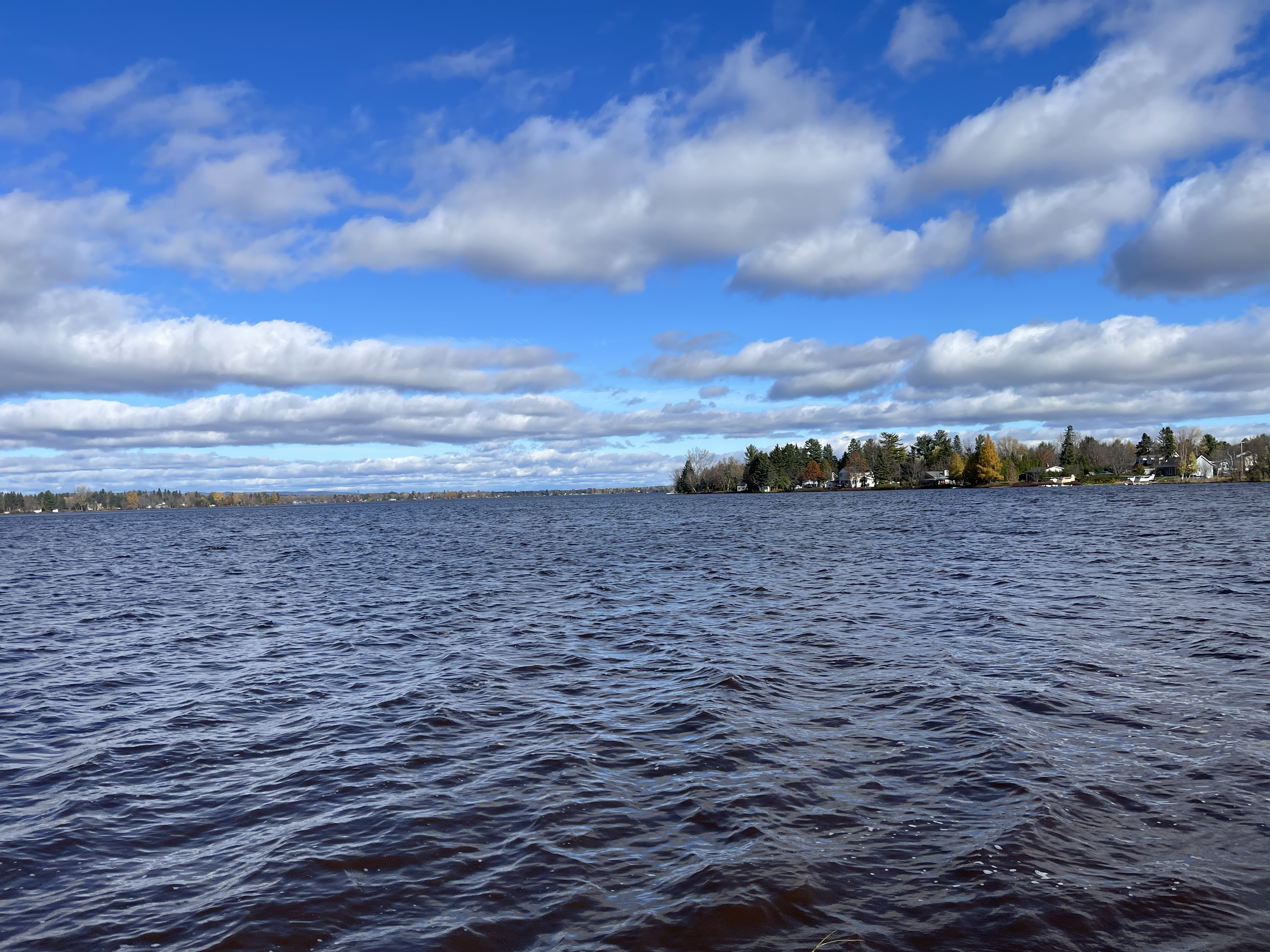
Shorelines and residences, Avenue du Tour-du-Lac

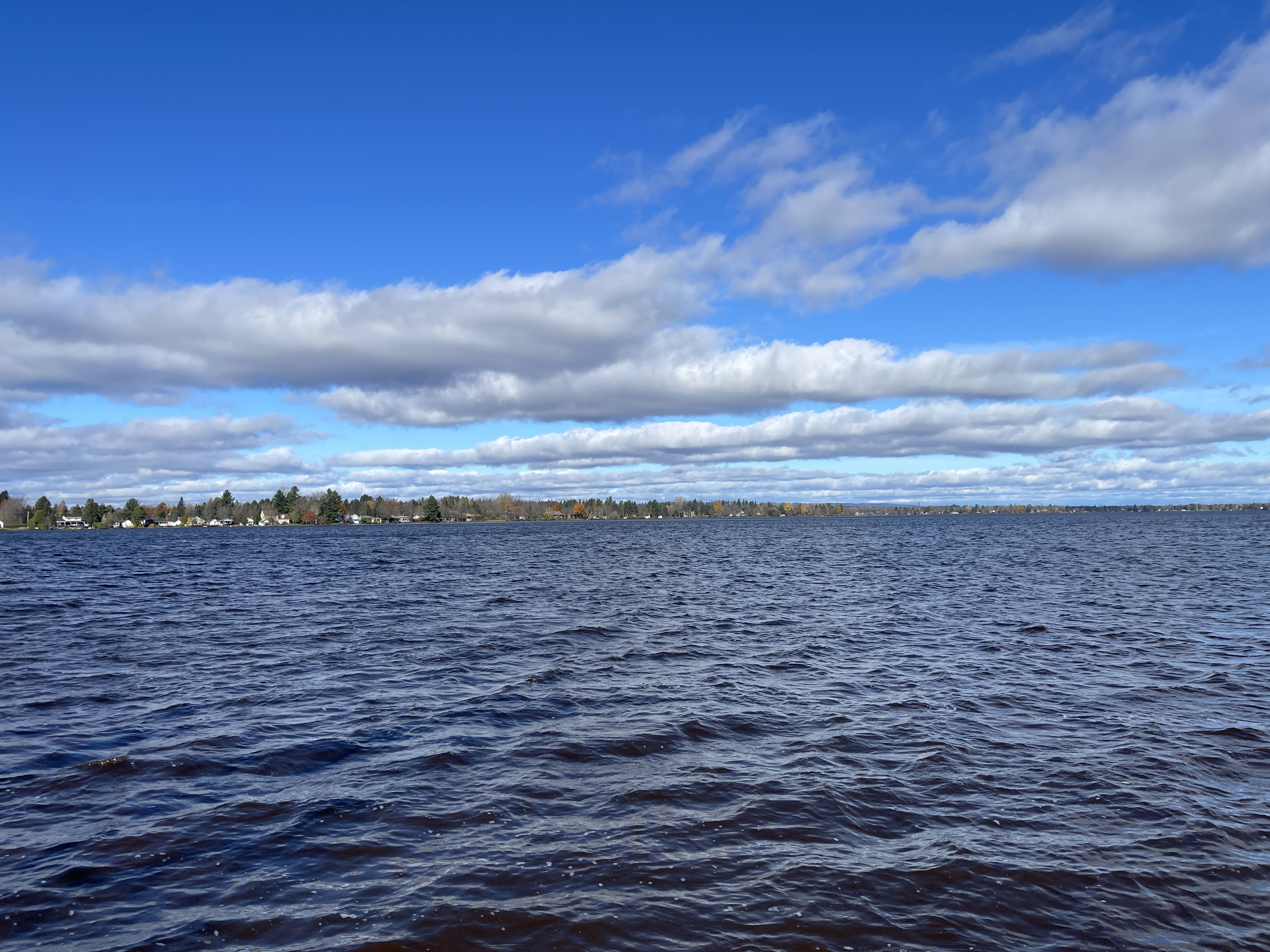
Shorelines and residences, Avenue du Tour-du-Lac
Cradle of Quebec's commercial bush aviation industry

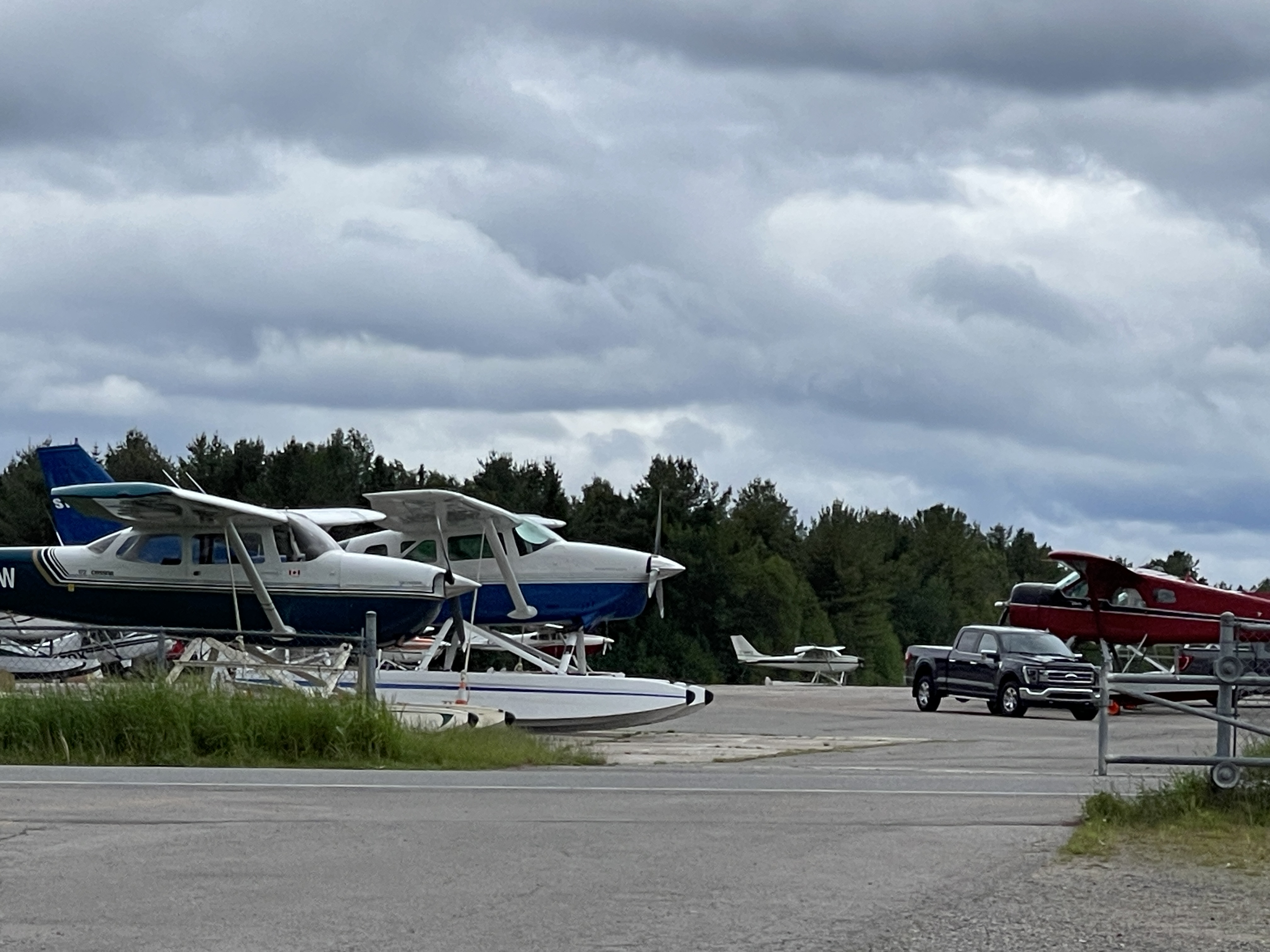
Tarmac of the Lac-à-la-Tortue aerodrome, Chemin de la Vigilance

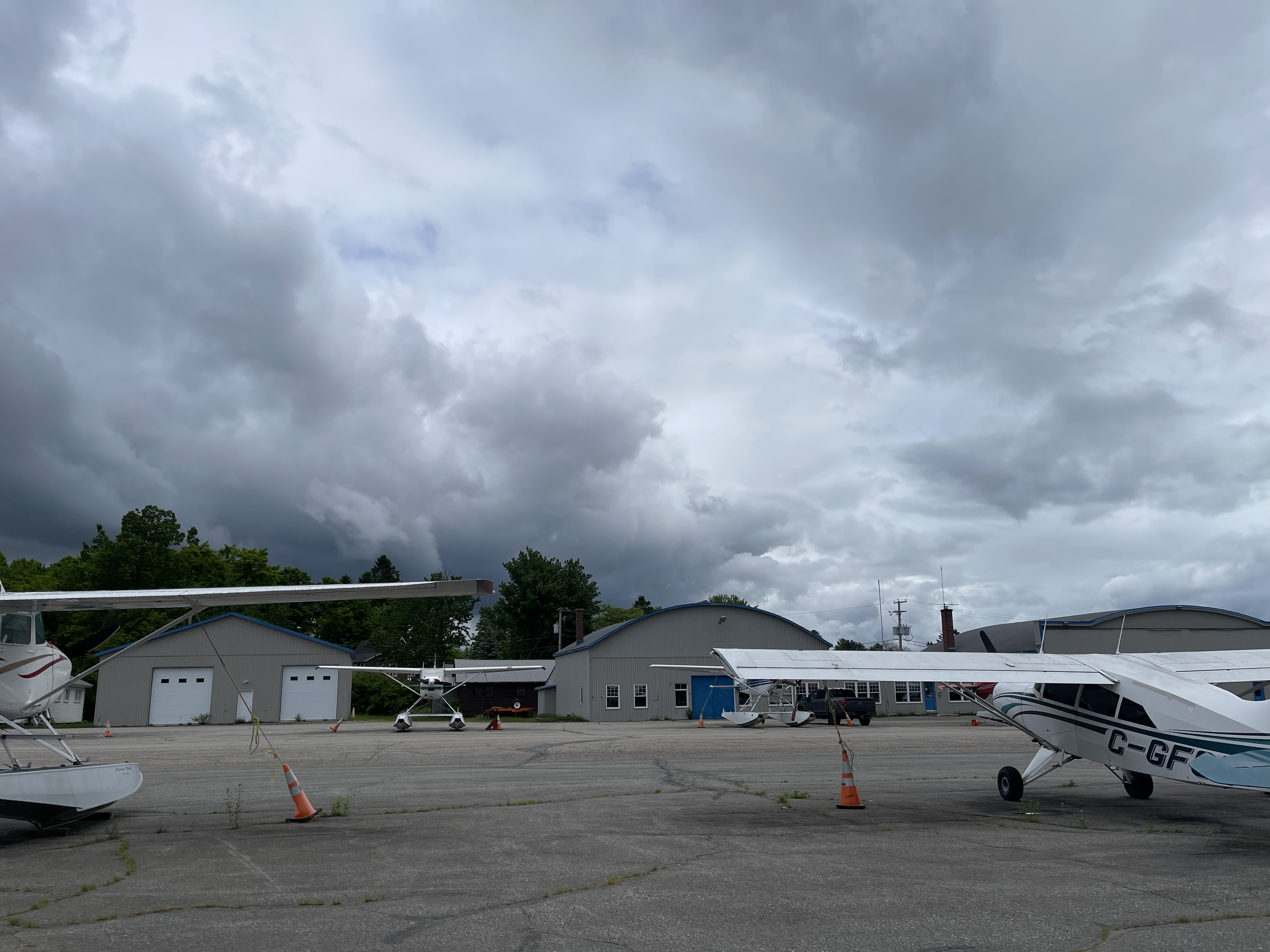
Tarmac of the Lac-à-la-Tortue aerodrome Chemin de la Vigilance

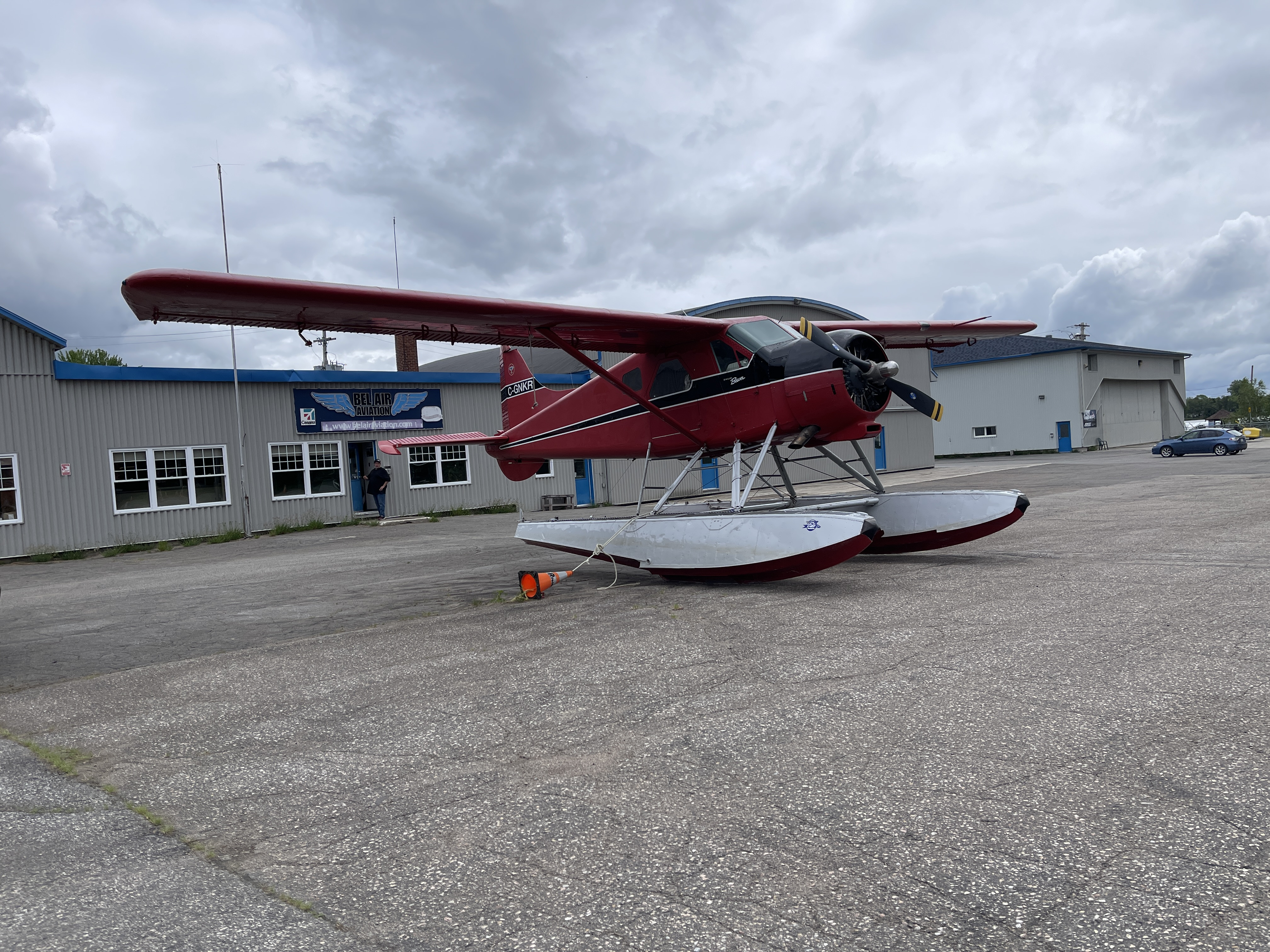
Tarmac of the Lac-à-la-Tortue aerodrome Chemin de la Vigilance

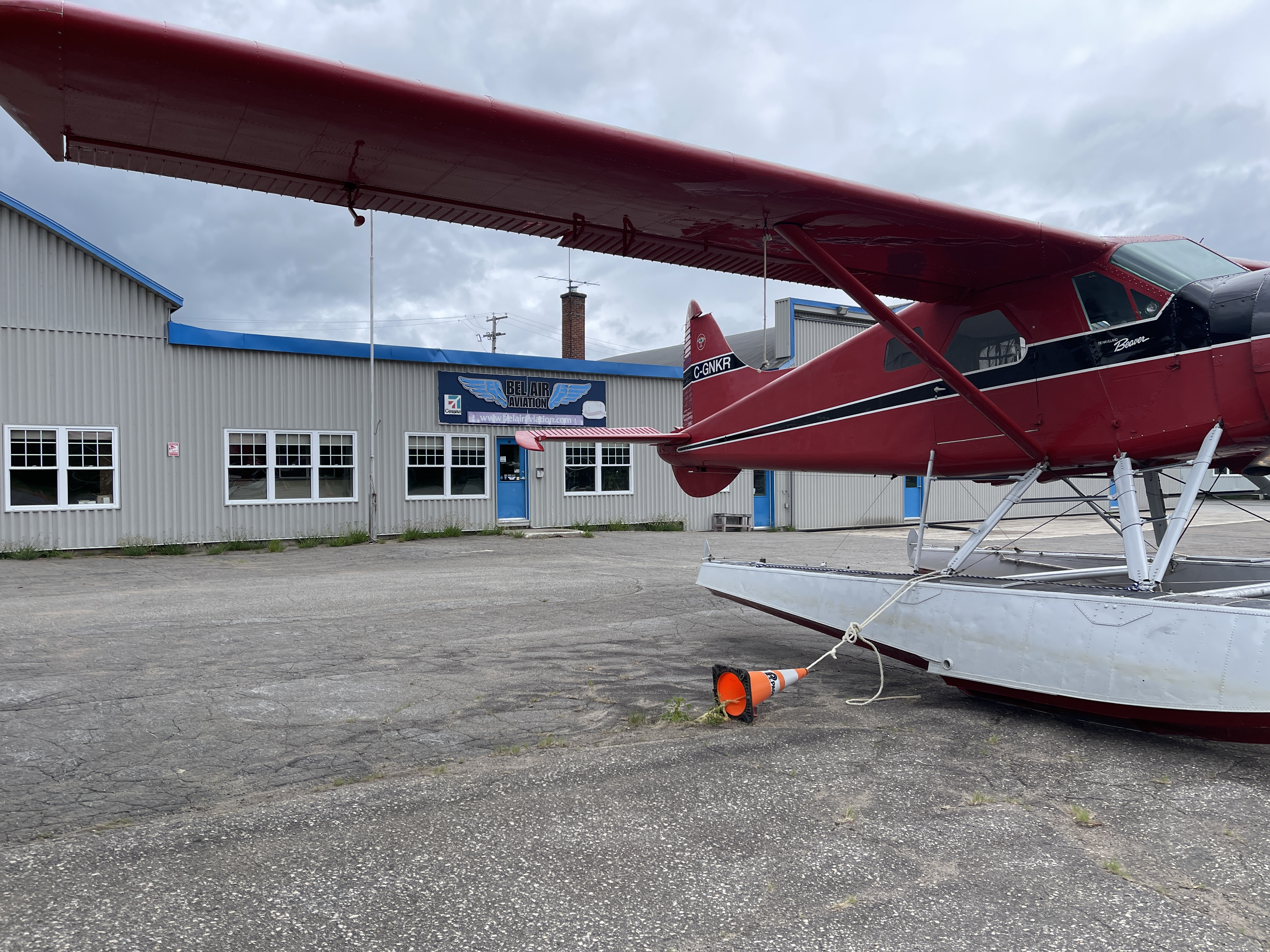
Tarmac of the Lac-à-la-Tortue aerodrome, Chemin de la Vigilance

== See also ==
- History of aviation in Canada
- Canadian Bushplane Heritage Centre
- Shawinigan, Designated as "Cité de l'énergie" by virtue of its hydroelectric and industrial history
- Radnor Township, Quebec
- Lac-à-la-Tortue Airport
- Lac-à-la-Tortue Water Aerodrome
- Lac-à-la-Tortue Ecological Reserve
