= Saint-Narcisse =

- Parish municipality
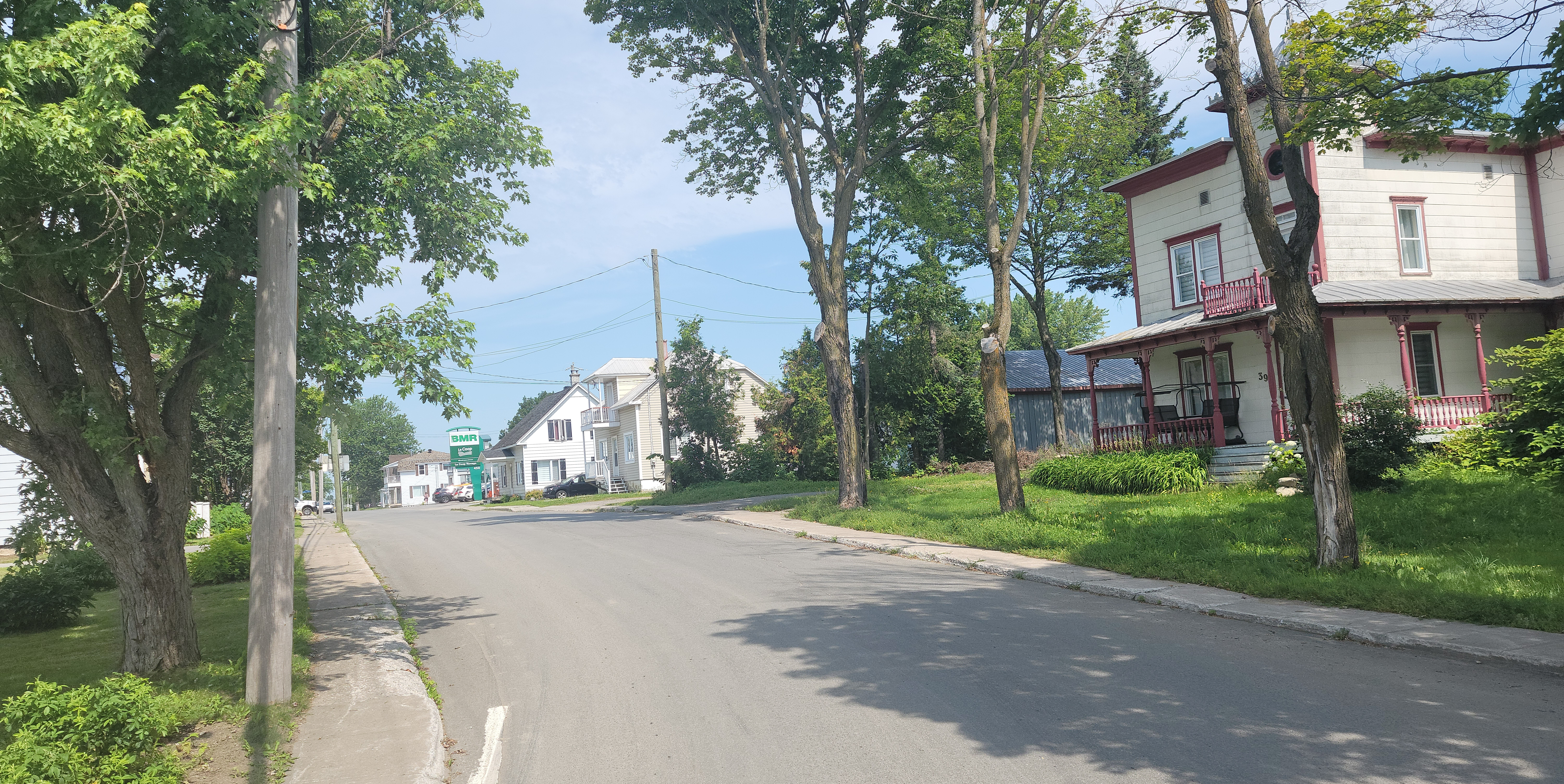

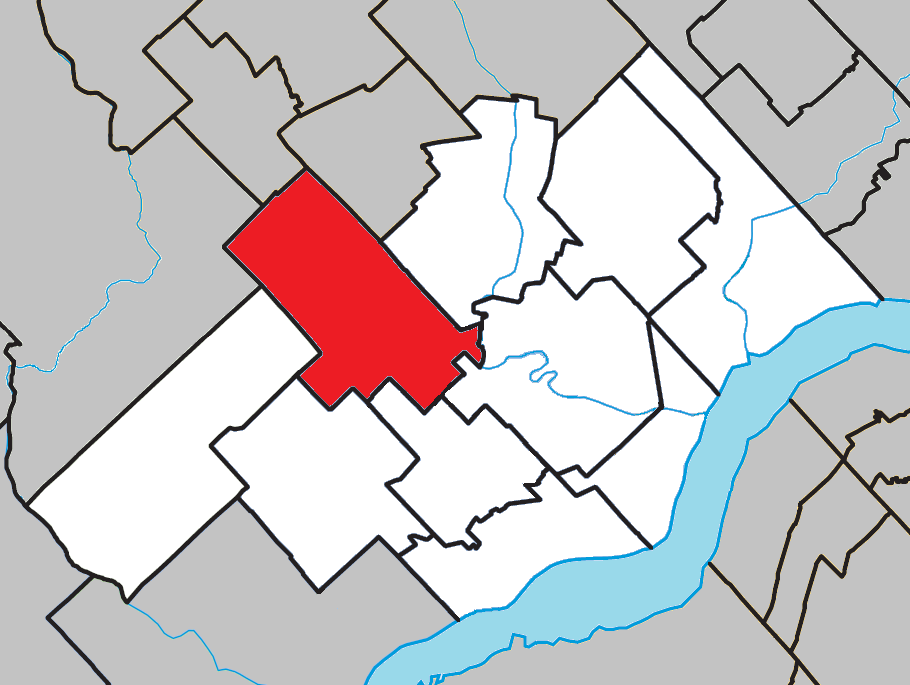
- Location within Les Chenaux RCM

- Location in central Quebec
- Coordinates: 46°34′N 72°28′W
- Country: Canada
- Province: Quebec
- Region: Mauricie
- RCM: Les Chenaux
- Constituted: July 1, 1855

Government
  - Mayor: Guy Veillette
  - Fed. riding: Saint-Maurice—Champlain
  - Prov. riding: Champlain

Area
  - Total: 106.74 km^{2} (41.21 sq mi)
  - Land: 106.74 km^{2} (41.21 sq mi)

Population (2021)
  - Total: 1,801
  - Density: 16.9/km^{2} (44/sq mi)
  - Pop 2016-2021: ▼1.7%
  - Dwellings: 916
- Time zone: UTC−05:00 (EST)
  - Summer (DST): UTC−04:00 (EDT)
- Postal code(s): G0X 2Y0
- Area codes: 418 and 581
- Highways: R-352; R-359; R-361
- Website: www.saint-narcisse.com

Saint-Narcisse (French pronunciation: [sɛ̃ naʁsis]) is a parish municipality located in the regional county municipality (MRC) Chenaux, in the administrative region of Mauricie, in the province of Quebec, in Canada. Located on the North Shore of the Saint Lawrence River, about 30 km (19 mi) from downtown Trois-Rivières, the parish of Saint-Narcisse is the heart of the Mauricie region.

The town was named in honour of Saint Narcissus. A statue of Saint-Narcisse sits atop the main altar of the church of Saint-Narcisse. Narcisse was born in ancient Israel in the late first century of the Christian era. Third Bishop of Jerusalem, he was appointed bishop at the age of 80 years. With Theophilus of Caesarea, he presided in the year 195 a council under the auspices of Pope Victor.

== History ==
The first pioneer Louis Cosset, came from Sainte-Geneviève-de-Batiscan, was established in Saint-Narcisse about 1804. Among the other early settlers, many came from the neighboring parishes of St. Lawrence River. The settlement expansion forced the new pioneers to cross a moraine an estimated one kilometer wide. This moraine path of the Mauricie, between Saint-Paulin at the west end and Saint-Raymond at the East end, is about 120 kilometers long. It is referred to as "Saint-Narcisse Moraine" because this moraine is more prominent at the height of Saint-Narcisse. This geological formation was shaped about 11,000 years ago, at the end of the last glacial period, with the deposition of various layers of rock at the foot of the gigantic glaciers.

== Geography ==
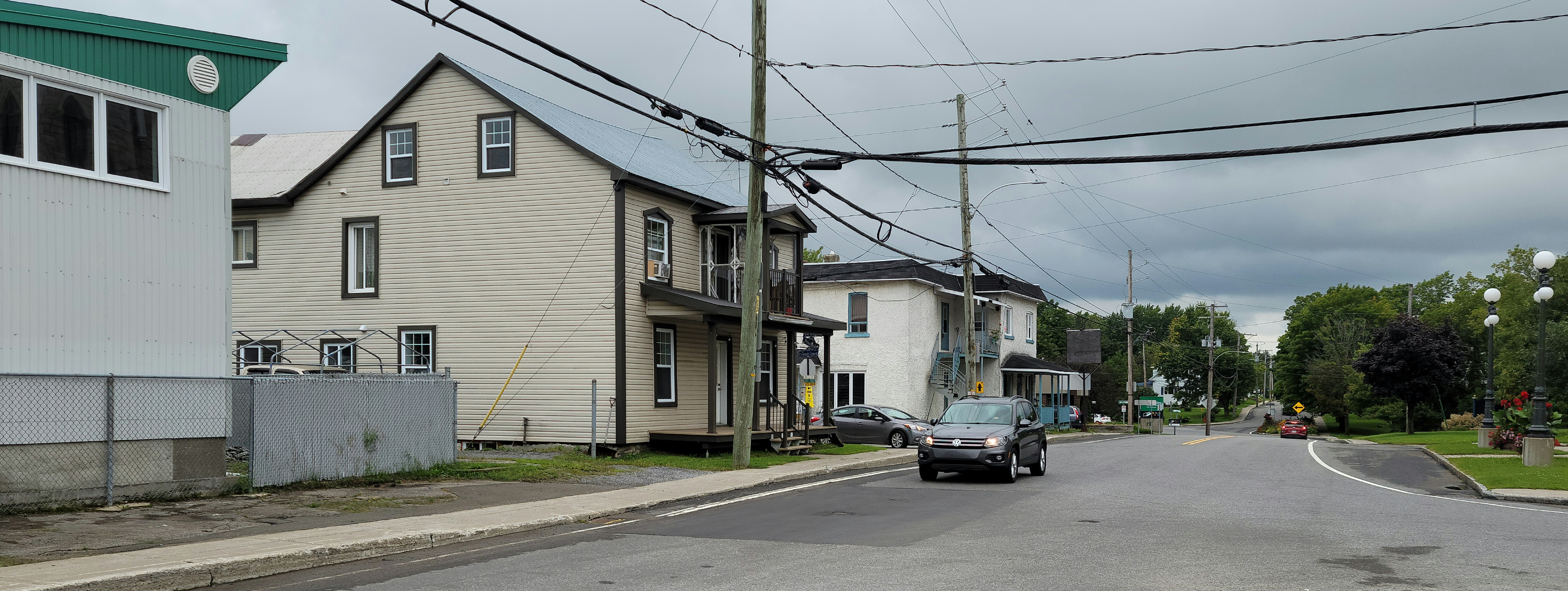
Buildings on the west side of rang de la La Grande Ligne (facing the church))

With an area of 104.87 km^{2} (40.49 sq mi), the city territory is divided by rows: Grande Ligne (Great line), the second highest rank Saint-Felix, row Sainte-Marguerite and row "Du Barrage" (row of the Dam). The territory also includes the "lake Morin" (popularly referred to as "Petit lac" - Little Lake) which is located north of the Grande Ligne (Great Line). A line of mountains crosses the municipal territory along its entire length, separating the plate of Middle Mauricie with the plain of the Lower Mauricie.

Its watershed is mostly part of the Batiscanie, except the southwest area, the limit of Champlain and of Saint-Luc-de-Vincennes. The municipality is crossed by five rivers: Batiscan River, Rivière des Chutes (River of the falls), Rivière-au-Lard (Bacon River), Rivière-aux-Fourches (River of the forks), and Rivière La Tortue (Turtle River). The route of the "Turtle River" enter into Saint-Narcisse by the northwest end (row "Côte St-Pierre - Northeast area"), where it crosses four lots on 1.4 km (0.87 mi). Then the river continues to flow in Saint-Séverin to go jump into the Rivière des Envies (River cravings).

=== Wetland ===
A sector of wetland covering three municipalities, is located south-east of Lac-à-la-Tortue, head of water between the watershed of Lac-à-la-Tortue (including the outlet of Lake Atocas), the rivière à la Tortue (Turtle River) and "Rivière des chutes" (Rivière des Chutes):

1. Row "Cote Saint-Pierre Coté Sud-Ouest", a few lands in the southeast of Hérouxville and a dozen lands of Saint-Narcisse;
2. Row "Cote Saint-Pierre Coté Northeast" in Saint-Narcisse, a few limited and isolated wetlands covering about 14 lots (near the road linking the Lac-à-la-Tortue and Saint-Narcisse);
3. Row X 's in Hérouxville, some isolated areas at the southeast of the row, spread on eight lots;
4. Row IX Lac-à-la-Tortue in Radnor Township, three lots (near the limit of Hérouxville);
5. Forefront of Radnor in Saint-Narcisse, north-east of the row, is the head area of the Rivière des Chutes.

== Demographics ==
In the 2021 Census of Population conducted by Statistics Canada, Saint-Narcisse had a population of 1,801 living in 851 of its 916 total private dwellings, a change of −1.7% from its 2016 population of 1,832. With a land area of 106.74 km^{2} (41.21 sq mi), it had a population density of 16.9/km^{2} (43.7/sq mi) in 2021.

Historical census populations – Saint-Narcisse

Year	Pop.	±%
1861	979	—
1871	1,469	+50.1%
1881	2,015	+37.2%
1891	1,950	−3.2%
1901	2,015	+3.3%
1911	2,233	+10.8%
1921	2,059	−7.8%
1931	2,159	+4.9%

Year	Pop.	±%
1941	2,207	+2.2%
1951	2,030	−8.0%
1956	2,079	+2.4%
1961	2,165	+4.1%
1966	2,155	−0.5%
1971	1,997	−7.3%
1976	1,956	−2.1%
1981	1,970	+0.7%

Year	Pop.	±%
1986	1,935	−1.8%
1991	1,995	+3.1%
1996	1,937	−2.9%
2001	1,858	−4.1%
2006	1,806	−2.8%
2011	1,762	−2.4%
2016	1,832	+4.0%
2021	1,801	−1.7%

Source: Statistics Canada

Mother tongue (2021):

- English as first language: 0.6%
- French as first language: 97.2%
- English and French as first language: 0.3%
- Other as first language: 1.7%

== Economy ==
The town is known for the making of mattresses, prefabricated homes, and the sale of farm tractors.

== Arts and culture ==
=== Solidarity Fair ===
From August 1982 until 2012, the community of Saint-Narcisse organized a festival that caters to the whole family. The "Fête de la Solidarité" (Solidarity Fair) was born during the economic downturn. While business people watching to consolidate the economic structure of the square, a group of young people organized the first Day of Solidarity. Their idea was to strengthen the social fabric of the city so that people have reason to celebrate despite the economic environment was difficult and they create links between them in order to overcome obstacles together. The Festival celebrated its 30th anniversary in the summer of 2011.

The programming of the festival included the solidarity between other musical performances, exhibitions and fireworks. A parade of fantastic night has already taken place during the festival, but this was abandoned activated for the 2008 edition because of volunteers. A park for children included games and entertainment organized. The town park gives out game shows organized for the benefit of children.

The decision that the party no longer exists fell in early 2013, following a meeting with the population of the municipality. The lack of volunteers led to the end of the festival that brought new tourists every year for over 30 years.

== Attractions ==
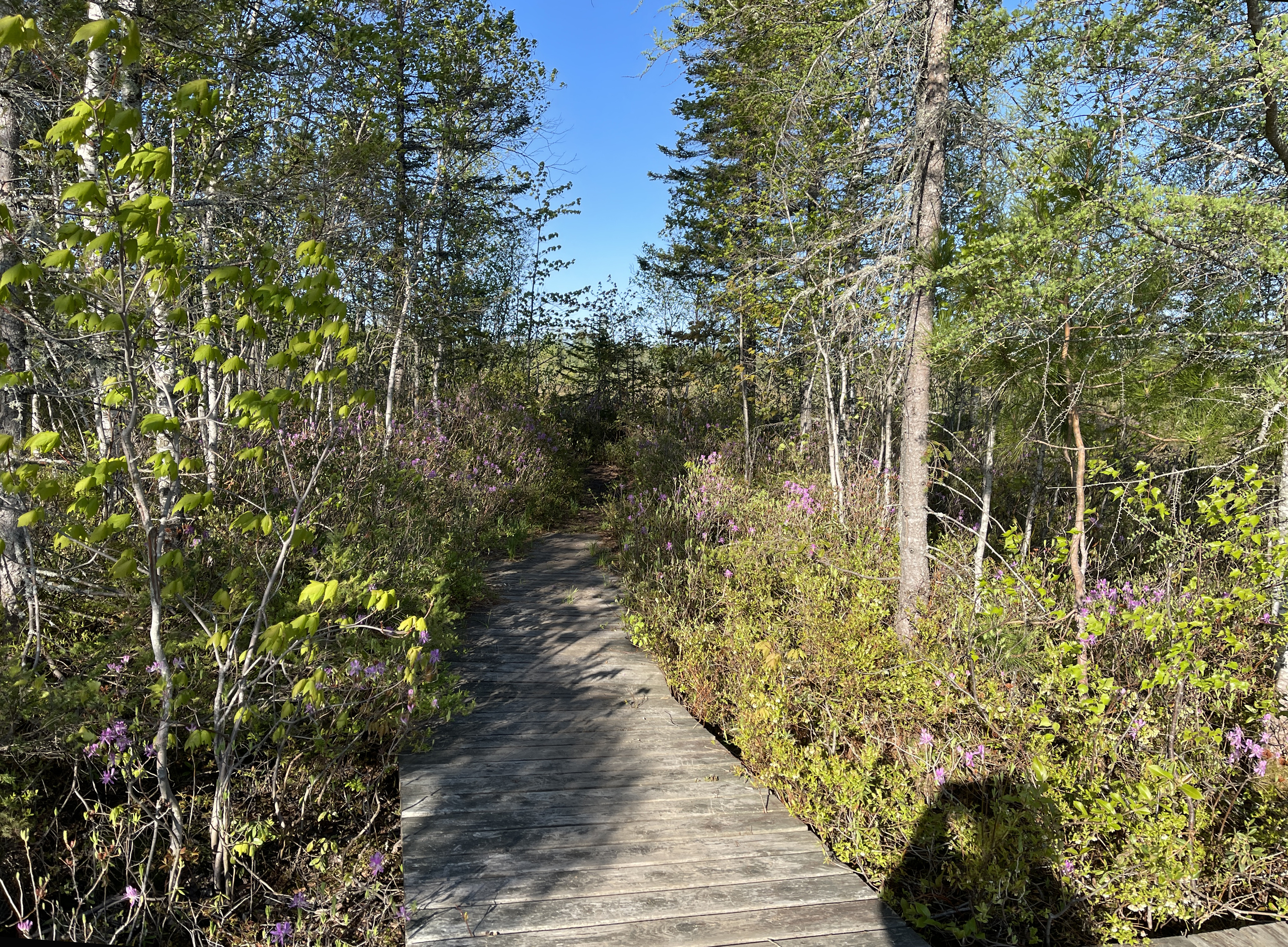
Wooden sidewalk lined with Rhododendron canadense

Parc Cœur Nature has a free 2.8 kilometres (1.7 mi) beginner-level trail. Wooden sidewalks facilitate traffic in wetter areas. Lookouts offer overviews of the bog. Along the way, there will be panels dealing with the bog, its geology, flora and fauna.

=== Catholic Church ===
The architecture of the church of Saint-Narcisse transcends in a Gothic style. It was built from 1871 to 1874. The bishop of the diocese of Trois-Rivières, Bishop Louis-François Richer Laflèche chaired the official blessing. In 1894, following a meeting of parishioners, the factory has made purchasing a system with four bells chime (bigger than the previous ones) made in Haute-Savoie, France, that is their teintement heard in the distance by the parishioners. In 1916, the factory decided on a 30 ft (9.1 m) extension of the church building a new facade with two towers. The factory also allows the acquisition of a Casavant organ. The interior of the church is the work of the painter Monti.

=== Dupont House ===
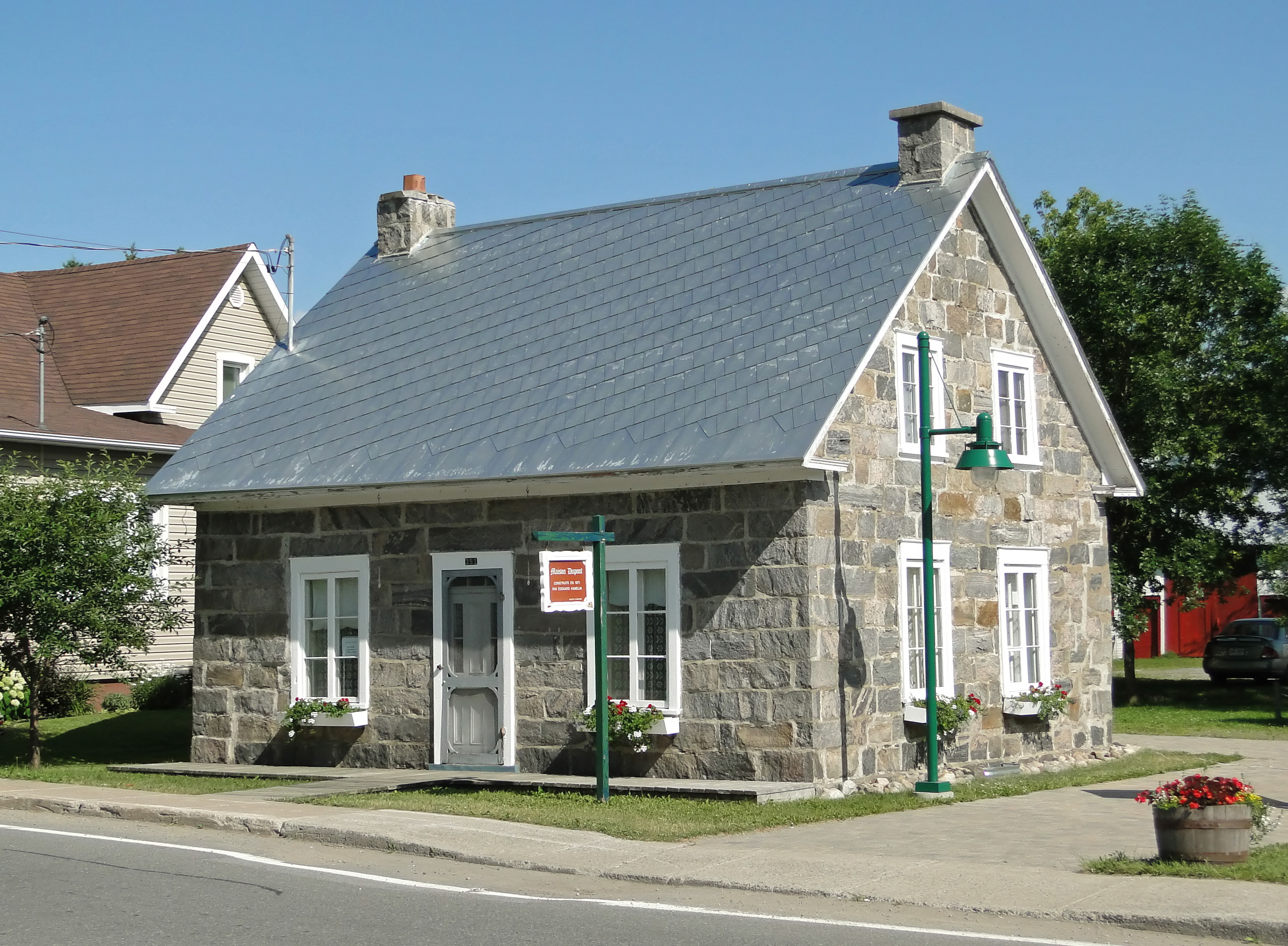
Dupont House

The Dupont House was built in 1871, adjacent to the church. This building has long served as a public meeting place for parishioners on Sundays, especially after church services celebrated in the church. This house of a classic 19th-century style is now owned by the municipality. The historical committee of the parish of Saint-Narcisse administers this historical house. The mission of the Dupont House has been transformed into an arts centre and exhibition hall.

=== Hydroelectric plant on Batiscan River ===
The hydroelectric power station of Saint-Narcisse was built between 1895 and 1897 to harness the great falls of the Batiscan River. This plant helped build the first high voltage line of the British Empire and it linked Saint-Narcisse to Trois-Rivières. Electricity Saint-Narcisse fed the electrical distribution system of the city of Trois-Rivières, including street lighting.

From the village of Saint-Narcisse, visitors access to the barrage of Batiscan River using the Route 361 on about 2.4 km (1.5 mi), then just follow road signs of Hydro-Quebec.

In the area of the falls of the Batiscan River, the Batiscan River Park was built in the wilderness, there to practice outdoor activities such as camping, walking the trails, biking, observing of flora and fauna ...

== Government ==
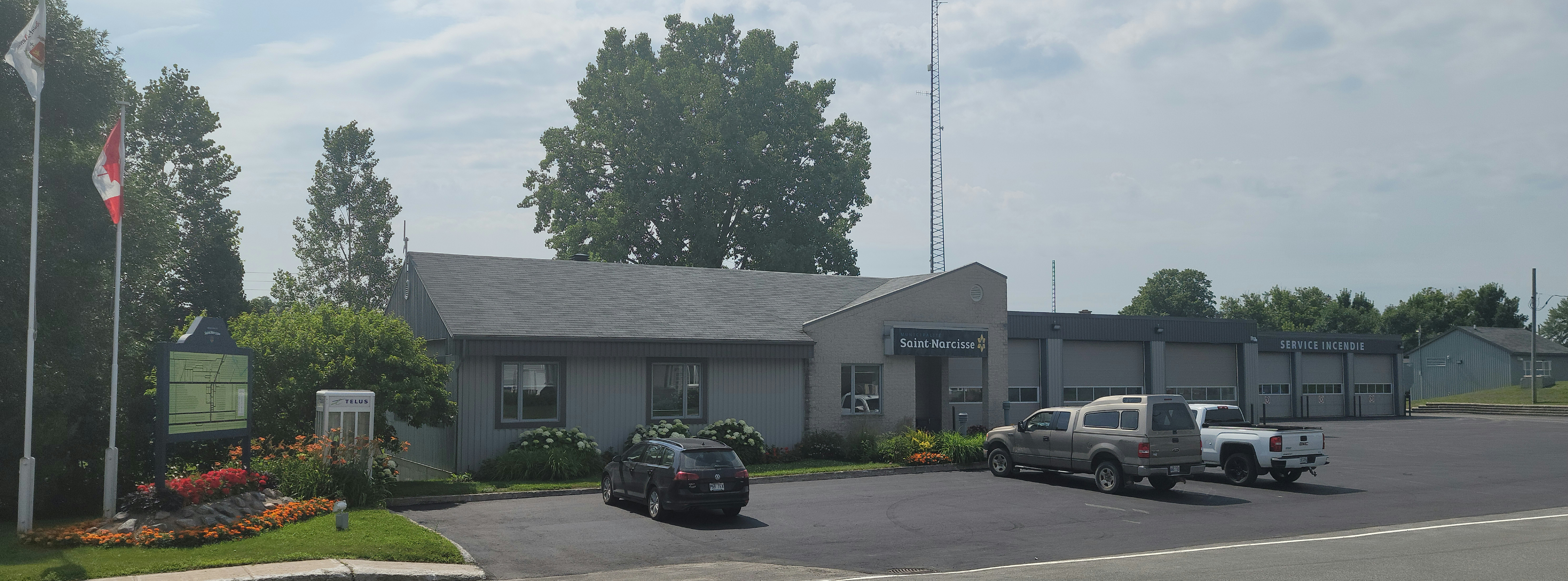
Saint-Narcisse Town hall

The territory of Saint-Narcisse is part of two old lordships, Lordship of Batiscan and Lordship of Champlain, separated by the path of the "Grande ligne" (Great Line). The municipality was erected on December 29, 1954. A second decree of April 14, 1859 clarified the boundaries of the municipality. On July 25, 1894 Louis-François Richer Laflèche ordered by the detachment of several batches of rows Sainte-Marguerite (lots 790–800) and St. Felix (lots 688–701), the parish of Saint-Maurice to attach them to the parish of Saint-Narcisse.

The parish municipality of Saint-Narcisse is one of the municipalities resulting from the first municipal boundaries of the province of Quebec. Initially part of the Champlain County, Saint-Narcisse was included in the Regional County Municipality of Francheville in 1982. In 2002, the municipality of Saint-Narcisse went to the regional county municipality of Les Chenaux.

List of former mayors:

- Wilfrid Pronovost (1929-1933)
- Romuald D. Cossette (1933-1939)
- Ephrem GrandMaison (1939-1947)
- Victor St-Arnault (1947-1955)
- Henri St-Arnaud (1955-...)
- Henri Paul Cossette
- Gilles R. Cossette (...-2005)
- Guy Veillette (2005-present)

== Notable people ==
- Marcel Trudel (29 May 1917 - 11 January 2011), 93 years, Quebec historian.
- Yanni Gourde, a hockey player with the Tampa Bay Lightning of the National Hockey League.

== See also ==
- Saint-Stanislas
