= Tavibois =

The Centre Tavibois (French pronunciation: [tavibwa]) is located in Hérouxville, in the Mékinac Regional County Municipality, in Mauricie, in Quebec, in Canada.

Community ownership of the Daughters of Jesus, this area offers a variety of services all seasons to individuals, families and groups: accommodation, meals at the Manor, meeting rooms and outdoor activities. In the history of the Mauricie, the center was an important gathering place for events secular or religious. Under the leadership of Bishop Albert Tessier, from the mid-1950s, Tavibois is recognized as a meeting place for intellectuals and artists. This center is very popular as a summer camp for youth education.

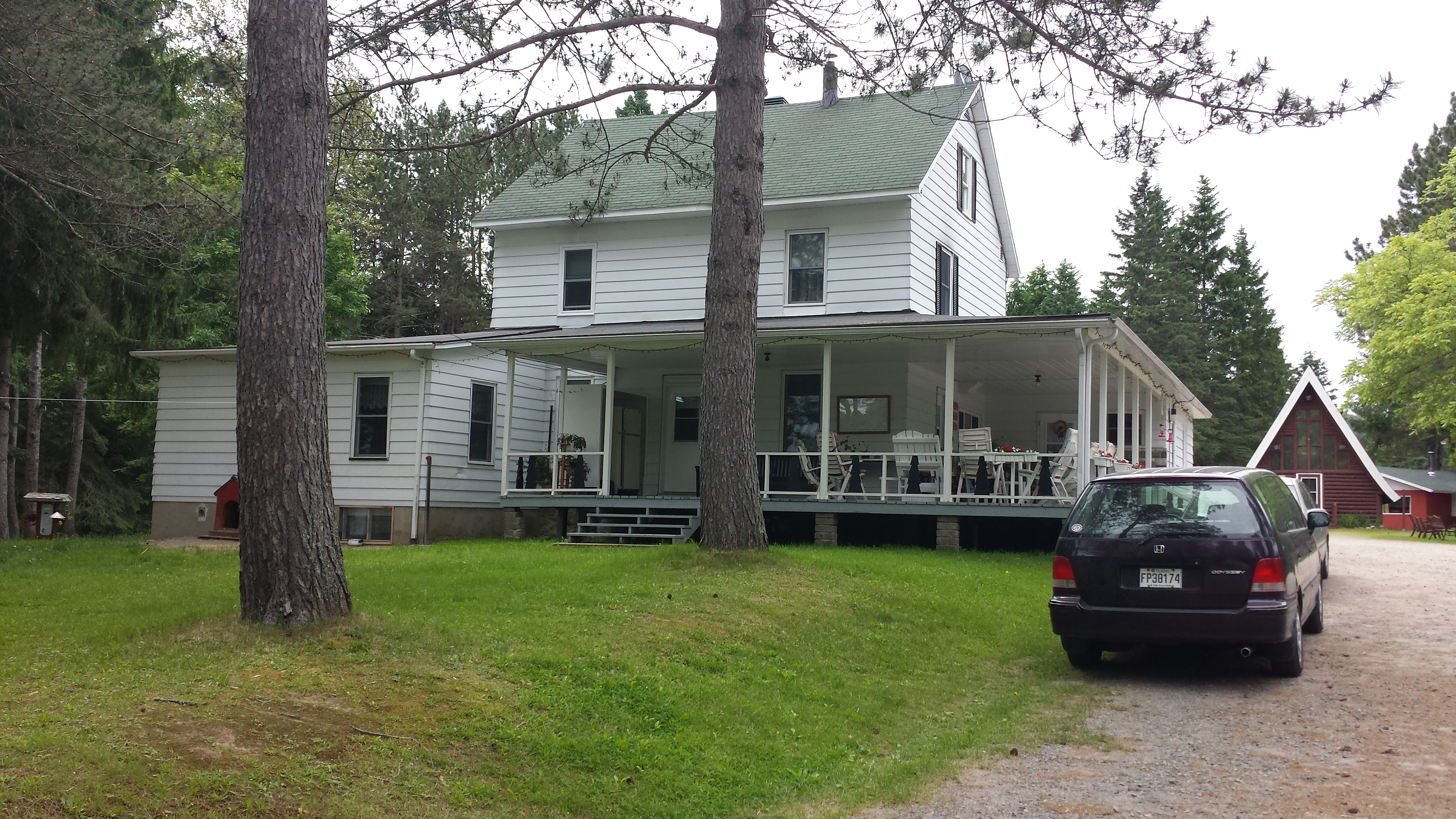

== Geography ==
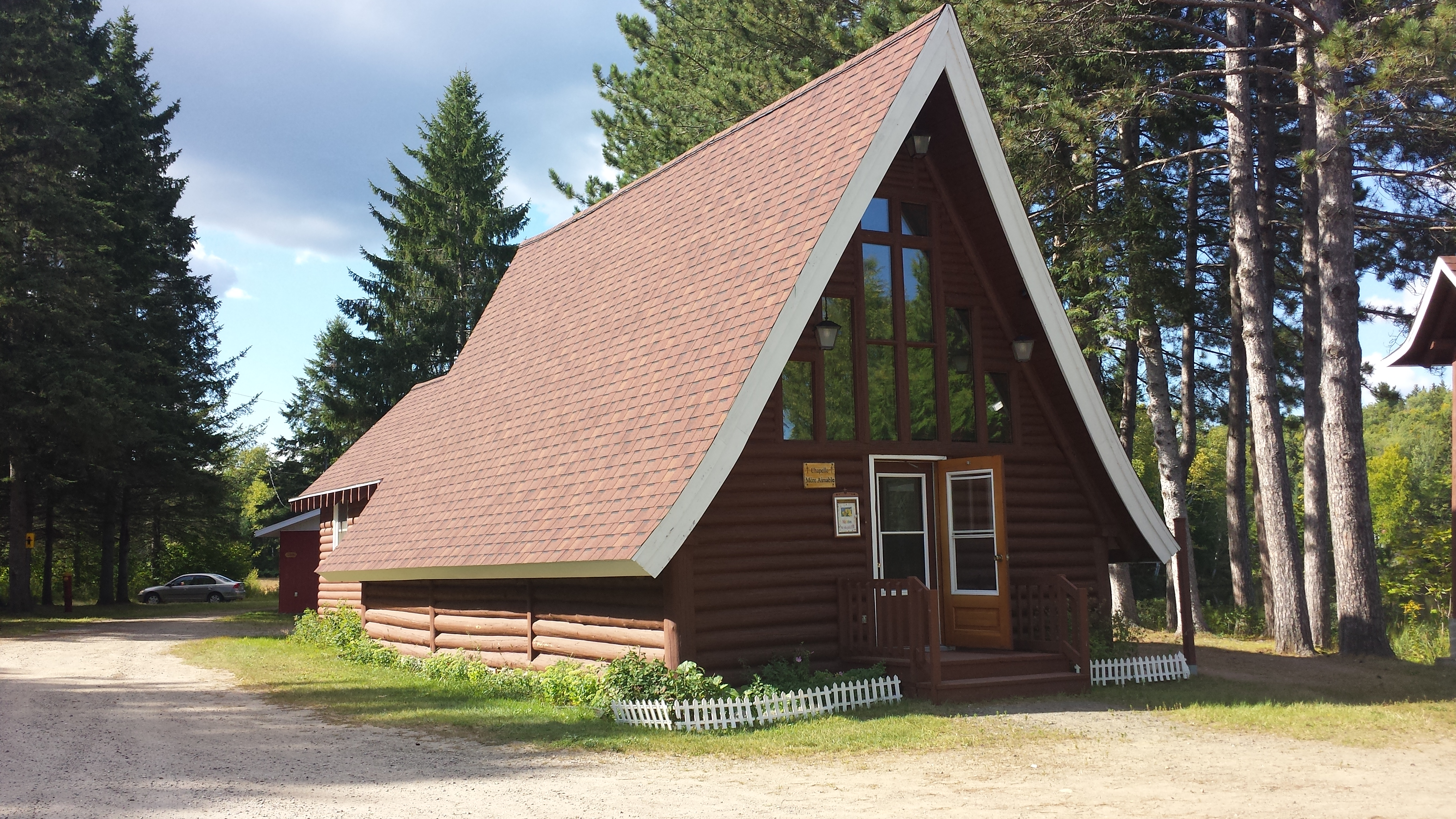
View of the exterior of the Tavibois chapel, in Hérouxville, in 2014.

To reach the "Tavibois center", visitors will go 4.9 km in road Saint-Pierre-North, from the intersection of Route 153 in Hérouxville, then turn right to the road "Chemin Tavibois". Tavibois center is close to the municipal boundary between Grandes-Piles and Hérouxville.

Despite its proximity to the Saint-Maurice River, 3.8 km (measured in a straight line), the Tavibois center is part of the watershed of the Batiscanie, Quebec. The area surrounding the Tavibois center with several wet areas is the head of the South Mékinac River, which flows in Saint-Tite in the North Mékinac River. It empties into the Rivière des Envies, upstream of the city of Saint-Tite.

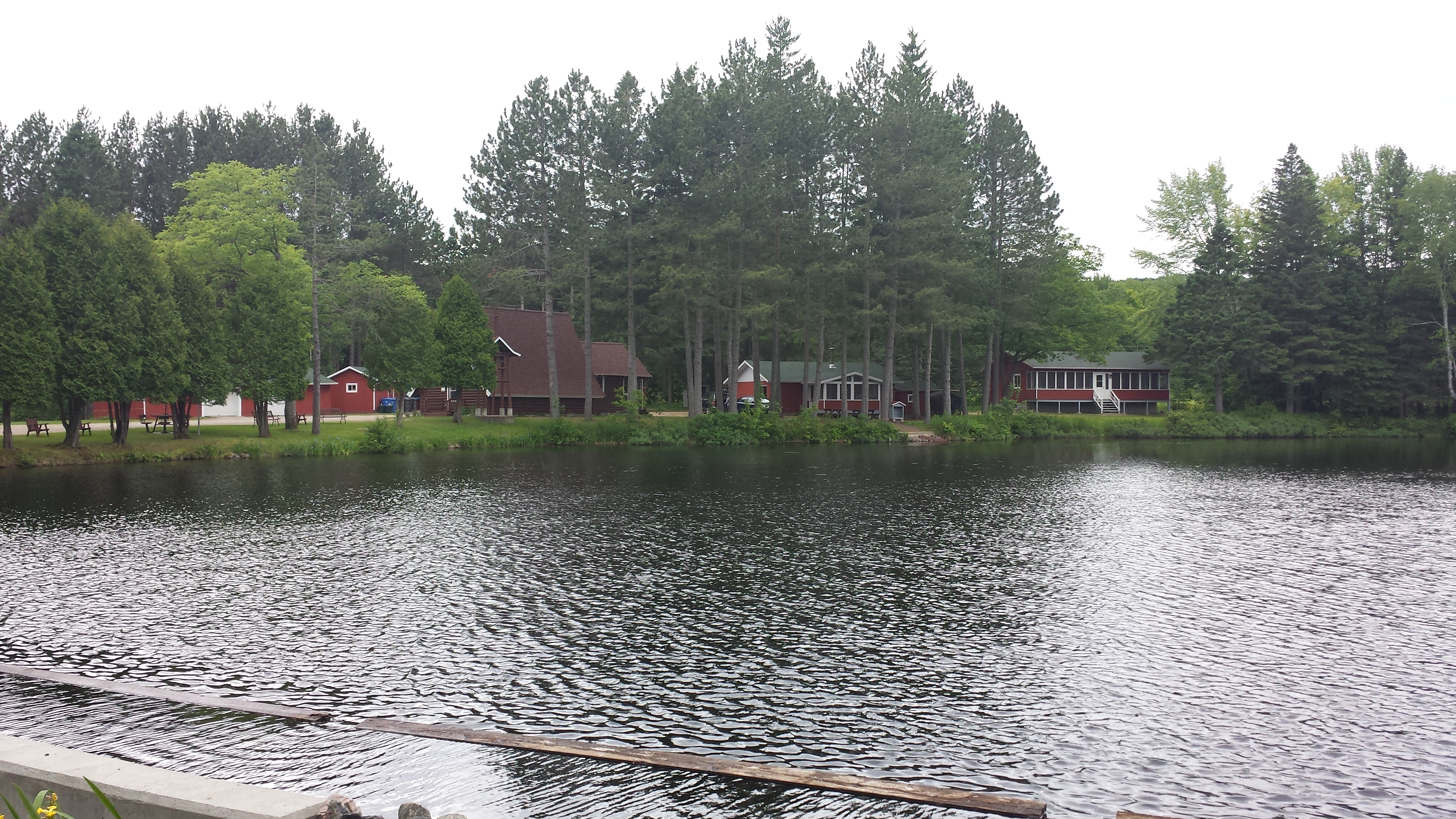
View in 2014 of the main buildings at Domaine Tavibois, Hérouxville, from the Lac Tavibois dam.

The Tavibois domain has three small lakes near the center: Tavibois, Leo and Tessier. Each lake has a retention dam. Upstream in the territory of Grandes-Piles, found the “lac à la truite” (lake of the trout) and lake Gagnon. These lakes drain into the South Mékinac River, whose path to the east (or to Saint-Tite), is more or less parallel to the path of “Petites forges” (Little forges road). This path connects Rang Saint-Pierre-North (Hérouxville) to “chemin Haut-du-lac-South” (Hérouxville).

== History ==
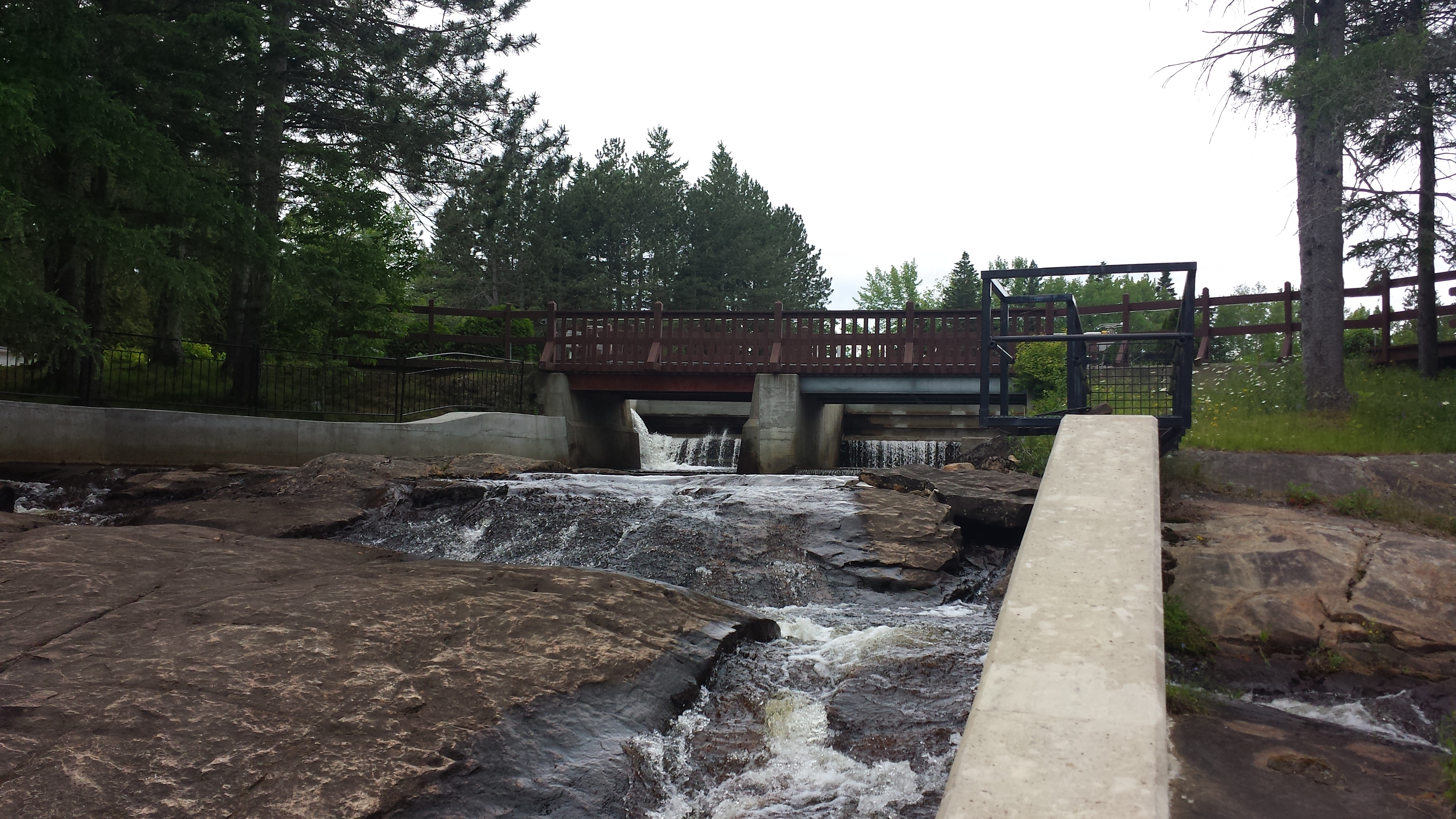
Dam at the mouth of Lake Tavibois (upper body of water) and the spillway, in Tavibois, Hérouxville, in 2014.

Formerly, this area of land was used for agriculture and forestry. At the end of the 19th century, John McDougall acquired this area which also included the Forges Saint- Joseph where iron or was mined. An old blast furnace had been built in 1870. Eventually, the Forges activities were dropped and afterwards a sawmill there was exploited until the end of the 19th century.

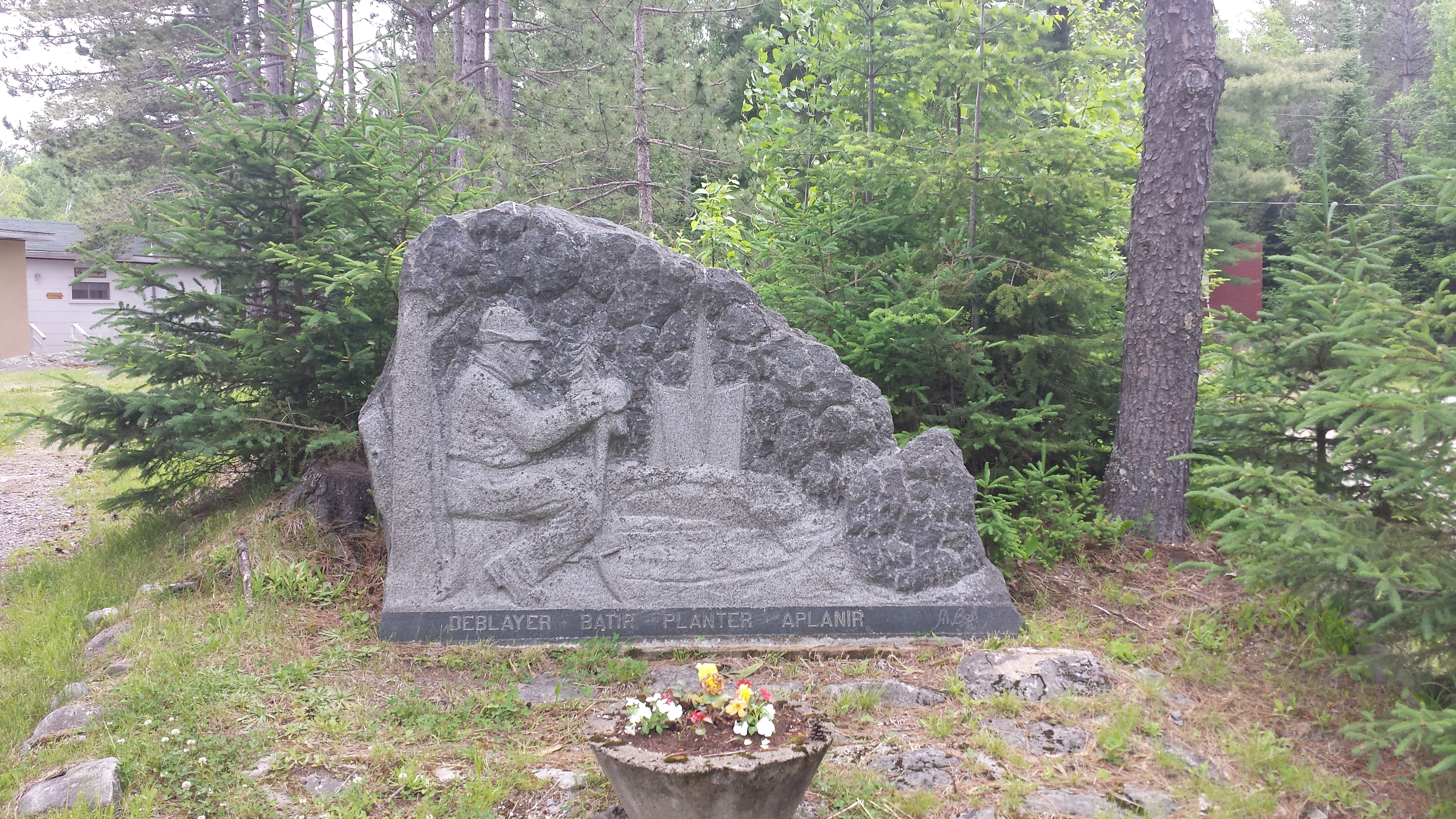
Monument to the pioneers installed on the Tavibois estate in Hérouxville.

In 1951, the area of Tavibois was acquired by three co-owners: Albert Tessier, Dr. Avila Denoncourt and Father Boivin. This land included 300 acres, including Farm Rocheleau also called “Petites forges” (Little Forges). Their first intention was to make it their fishing club and a place of relaxation and meditation. The second objective was to make it a community farm-school project. In 1956, the founders signed an agreement to partition the estate. Since the establishment of the Tavibois center, Archbishop Tessier and Dr. Denoncourt have greeted the end of the stay in the community of the Daughters of Jesus, through physical maintenance, website development and animation. The community center was then adopted before the Daughters of Jesus fully inherited the administration of this domain.

This private estate is owned by the Community of the Daughters of Jesus since 1966. Although the area is part of the heritage of the community, the facilities are open to the public as a place of meditation, contemplation or rest. Families can rent cabins at low prices; each visitor brings his bedding and food.

Tavibois hosted renowned artists including Jordi Bonet, the French poet Gustave Thibon, Pierre Bourgault, Leo Arbour, Lévis Martin, and many others. Avila Denoncourt, one of the founders of Tavibois, proved to be himself an artist - sculptor of the highest caliber, and several sculptures he fashioned can now be found at Tavibois Center.

== Toponymy ==
The designation "Tavibois" refers to the acrostic formed by the names of the three founders:

- T for Tessier (Bishop Albert Tessier)
- AVI for Avila (Dr. Avila Denoncourt)
- BOIS for Boivin (Father Paul Boivin).

== See also ==
- Hérouxville
- North Mékinac River
- South Mékinac River
- Batiscanie, Quebec
- Batiscan River
- Rivière des Envies
- Daughters of Jesus

=== Bibliography ===
- Commission de toponymie du Québec (Geographical Names Board of Quebec) – Bank of places names
- Work "Tavibois, 1951-2009 : l'héritage d'Albert Tessier aux Filles de Jésus" (Tavibois, 1951-2009: The Legacy of Albert Tessier to the Daughters of Jesus). Author: René Hardy, 1943 Septentrion Publishing, printing 2010. (in French)
- Article "Histoire régionale - Tavibois: un épisode méconnu de l'histoire de la Mauricie" (Regional History - Tavibois: a little known episode in the history of the Mauricie), by Paul Bennett, published in the Journal Le Devoir on September 4, 2010. (in French)
- Article "Exposition sur Tavibois au Musée des Filles de Jésus" (Tavibois Exhibition at the Museum of the Daughters of Jesus), by François Houde, published June 17, 2011 in the Journal Le Nouvelliste. (in French)
