= Lake Fontaine (Mékinac) =

Lake in Grandes-Piles, Quebec, Canada

Lake Fontaine (Grandes-Piles)
- "Lake Fontaine (Mékinac)" in Batiscanie, in Quebec
- Coordinates: 46°48′5″N 72°39′42″W
- Type: Natural
- Primary outflows: North Mékinac River
- Catchment area: Grandes-Piles
- Basin countries: Canada
- Max. length: 2.2 km (1.4 mi)
- Max. width: 0.5 km (0.31 mi)
- Settlements: Grandes-Piles

The Lac Fontaine (Fountain Lake) is a lake located in the municipality of Grandes-Piles, in the Mékinac Regional County Municipality, in Mauricie, in Quebec, in Canada.

== Geography ==
The "Lake Fontaine" is located in forest and mountain areas. The north end of the lake is 0.3 km south-west of the boundary of Sainte-Thècle. The southern end is located 0.4 km from the mouth of the "Lac du Renard" (Fox Lake), located in the southeast, which is a tributary of Lake Fontaine. At about 500 m north of "Lac du renard", there are three lakes "Toupies" (Spinners Lakes), whose waters flow into each other to the west to reach the Lake Fontaine.

Fontaine lake is 2.2 km long and its maximum width is 0.5 km. The southern part of the lake is a strait 0.8 km long to the bottom of a bay which receives the discharge of Philippe Lake.

The waters of Lake Fontaine pour the northwest at the end of a long bay in a small discharge of 0.5 km to the lake Nicolas that crosses North Mékinac River, which runs in the Lejeune Township of Sainte-Thècle to the south-west. continues and in Grandes-Piles to reach the north end of Lake Roberge (Grandes-Piles)

The lake fontaine is made in length, in the north-south direction. The northern part of the lake Fontaine resembles to the shape of the head of a dog schnauzer looking towards the southeast. Two bays north then represent the dog's ears.

A forest road (north-south) serving the owners of the lake passes on the west side of the lake. The "Watchtower fire path" passes near the lake (south side), this path leads to the ancient tower fender at the top of a mountain in southern of Archange Lake (Mékinac). The "chemin of lake Fontaine" from the intersection of Route 159 at the north end of Lake Roberge (Grandes-Piles), and moves towards the northeast to cross the path "Joseph-St-Amant" that penetrates deep into the Lejeune Township of Sainte-Thècle.

== Toponymy ==
The name "Lac Fontaine" (Grandes-Piles) was recorded on December 5, 1968, at the Bank of place names of Commission de toponymie du Québec

== See also ==
- Grandes-Piles
- Sainte-Thècle
- Rivière des Envies
- Lordship of Sainte-Anne-de-la-Pérade
- Lordship of Batiscan
- Mékinac Regional County Municipality
- Batiscanie, Quebec
