= Camp Val Notre-Dame =

- Location within Quebec
- Location: 100 Chemin Val Notre Dame, Hérouxville, QC G0X 1J0, Canada
- Coordinates: 46.703353°N 72.640987°W
- Elevation: 160
- Type: Vacation camp
- Season: 4 seasons
- Operated by: Rendez-vous familial Pointe St-Charles inc. (non-profit organism)
- Owner: Rendez-vous familial Pointe St-Charles inc.
- Established: 1957
- Website: campvalnotre-dame.com

The camp Val Notre-Dame is a recreational camp established in 1957, in the South Range of the Mékinac River, in the municipality of Hérouxville, in the regional county municipality (MRC) of Mékinac, in the administrative region of Mauricie, in the province of Quebec in Canada.

== Customers ==
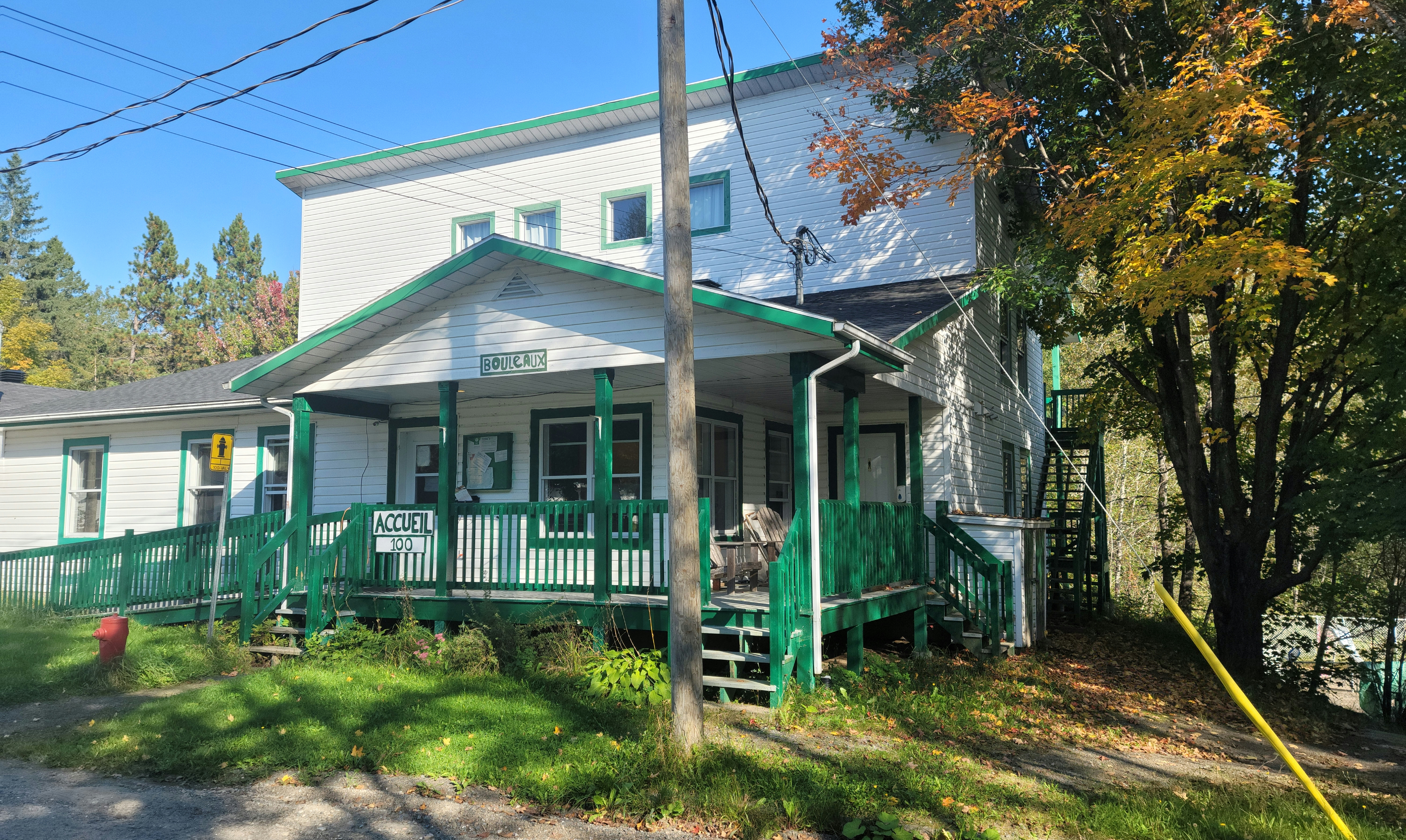
Camp Val-Notre-Dame reception chalet

Since 1987, Camp Val Notre-Dame has been a year-round family vacation camp aimed at being accessible to everyone, including children aged 0–2. The camp offers easy access to low-income families thanks to a pricing scale according to the seasons. The camp's mission is also to serve disabled people, immigrants and groups working with vulnerable clienteles in a context of family and socio-cultural recreation.

The Ministry of Education and Higher Education grants annual grants to the camp, thus making it possible to offer a discount on their stay to low-income families.

In the history of the camp, many groups have stayed at this picturesque site surrounded by nature, such as boy scouts and wolf cubs. In addition, other groups held events there, such as AFÉAS and the Golden Age which participated in "green days". In addition, the provincial archery championship was held every year on this site.

The camp has entered into an agreement with family groups in Montreal, including: Maison à petits pas, La Maison d´Haïti, The Muslim Association of Canada and the Regroupement des Marocains du Canada. The camp receives in particular multi-ethnic groups for stays of one week. In addition to associative events, the camp also welcomes groups for family events (eg: weddings, family reunions) or corporate events.

In addition, the camp is a stopover on the equestrian trail, offering various services to riders including a restaurant and accommodation, as well as a rest area for horses.

== Accreditations ==
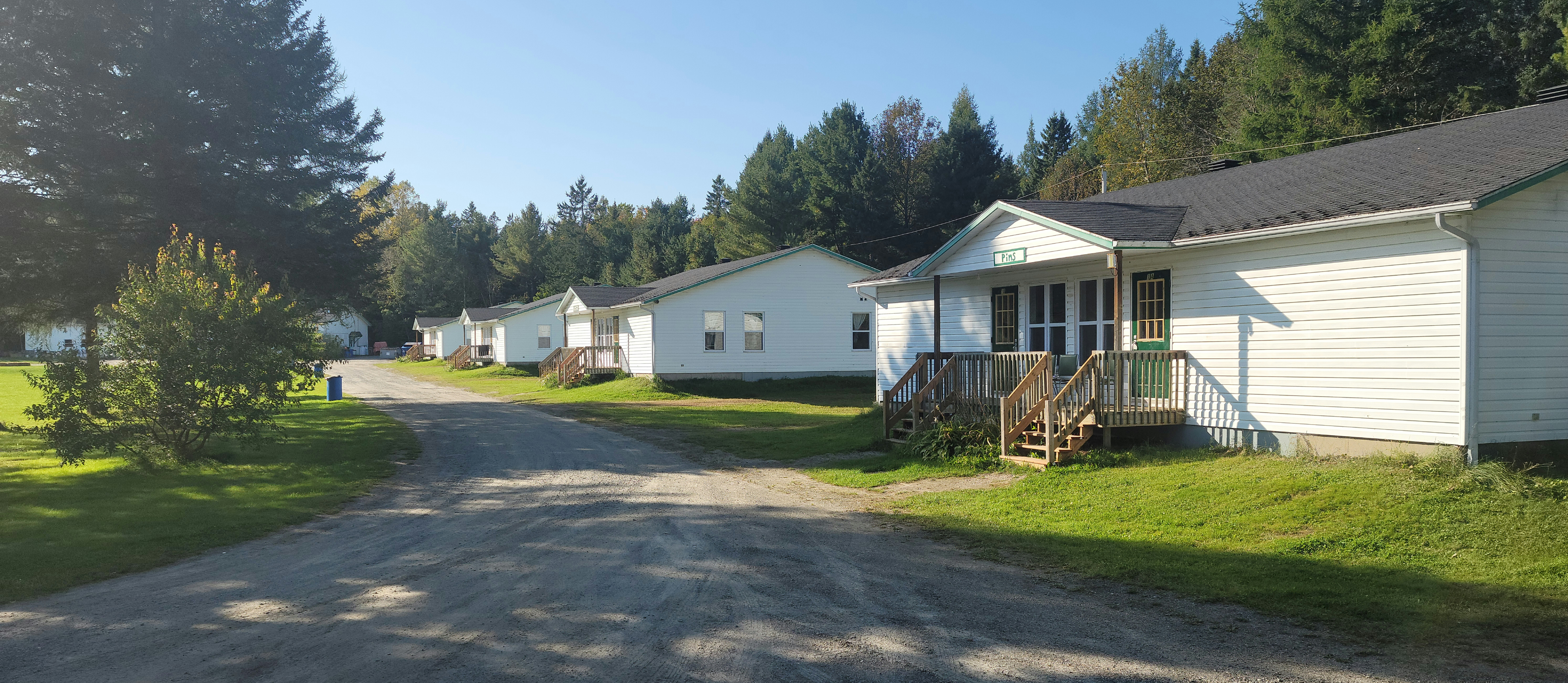
Series of cabins at Camp Val-Notre-Dame, serving as accommodation for campers and their administrators.

The Quebec Family Vacation Movement has accredited this camp. This organization assesses the quality of accommodation, the safety of activities and equipment, as well as the training of animation staff. The camp is also a member of the Tremplin santé organization; the mission of this organization is to promote the practice of physical activities as well as a healthy diet.

== Owner and members ==
In 1957, this site was acquired by the Institut des Frères de Saint-Gabriel de Champlain. The non-profit company "Camp Val Notre-Dame inc" was registered on April 27, 1978 for the operation of camp activities. This organization was in operation until October 1986, when the camp was sold.

The land rights of the Val Notre-Dame camp belong since October 1986 to the organization "Rendez-vous familial Pointe St-Charles inc". Their mission is to provide accessibility to outdoor vacations for low-income families, people with disabilities, immigrants and groups working with vulnerable clienteles in a context of family and socio-cultural recreation.

This non-profit organization in the social economy was born in 1971, following needs expressed in the neighborhood Pointe Saint-Charles in Montreal. The beginning of the organization was the initiative of Ms. Rose-Alma Girard, mother of 11 children, originally from Thetford Mines, socially involved in her Pointe Saint-Charles neighborhood.

Annually since 2015, usually in May, the camp has organized an all-you-can-eat lobster fundraising dinner to raise funds for camp activities.

In 2020, the camp has approximately 300 family members from all corners of the province. Members benefit from discounts during their stays at the camp. In 1975, a dozen families were members of the camp. In 2004, there were 250 families.

== Geography ==
The area of the camp covers 11.3 hectares straddling lots 418 and 419 of the South Rang of the Mékinac River.

The camp is set up on the north shore of Lake Ayotte (artificial lake), around the confluence of the South Mékinac River and the Mongrain stream. The entrance to the camp is located at 4.5 kilometres (2.8 mi) from the intersection of route 153 in the village of Hérouxville; either 3.0 kilometres (1.9 mi) north-west along rang Saint-Pierre-Nord road; then 1.5 kilometres (0.93 mi) north-east by Val Notre-Dame road. The entrance is on the left after the bridge spanning a bend in the Mékinac du Sud River.

The “Pointe St-Charles inc. » has a dam erected in 1982 on the South Mékinac River located 160 metres (520 ft) downstream, ie to the southwest of the bridge spanning Lake Ayotte. This concrete-gravity dam has a length of 35.7 metres (117 ft) and a height of 2.8 metres (9 ft 2 in), forming an artificial lake of 0.8 hectares (2.0 acres), at an altitude of 151 metres (495 ft) and a length of 0.7 kilometres (0.43 mi) used in particular for boating and swimming. The catchment area upstream of the dam is 26 kilometres (16 mi). This lake has a small dike with sluices and a weir. The current of the southern Mékinac river flows successively downstream into the Little Mékinac North River, rivière des Envies and Batiscan River.

The statue of the Virgin Mary was probably installed in the summer of 1961 on the first dam on the South Mékinac River located at the height of the camp in a bend in Lake Ayotte; this monument had been erected thanks to a popular subscription started in October 1960 within the Amicales St-Gabriel. This first dam erected under the current bridge was probably in operation between 1957 and 1982.

The Chemin Val Notre-Dame bridge spans a bend in this artificial lake.

== Buildings and infrastructures ==
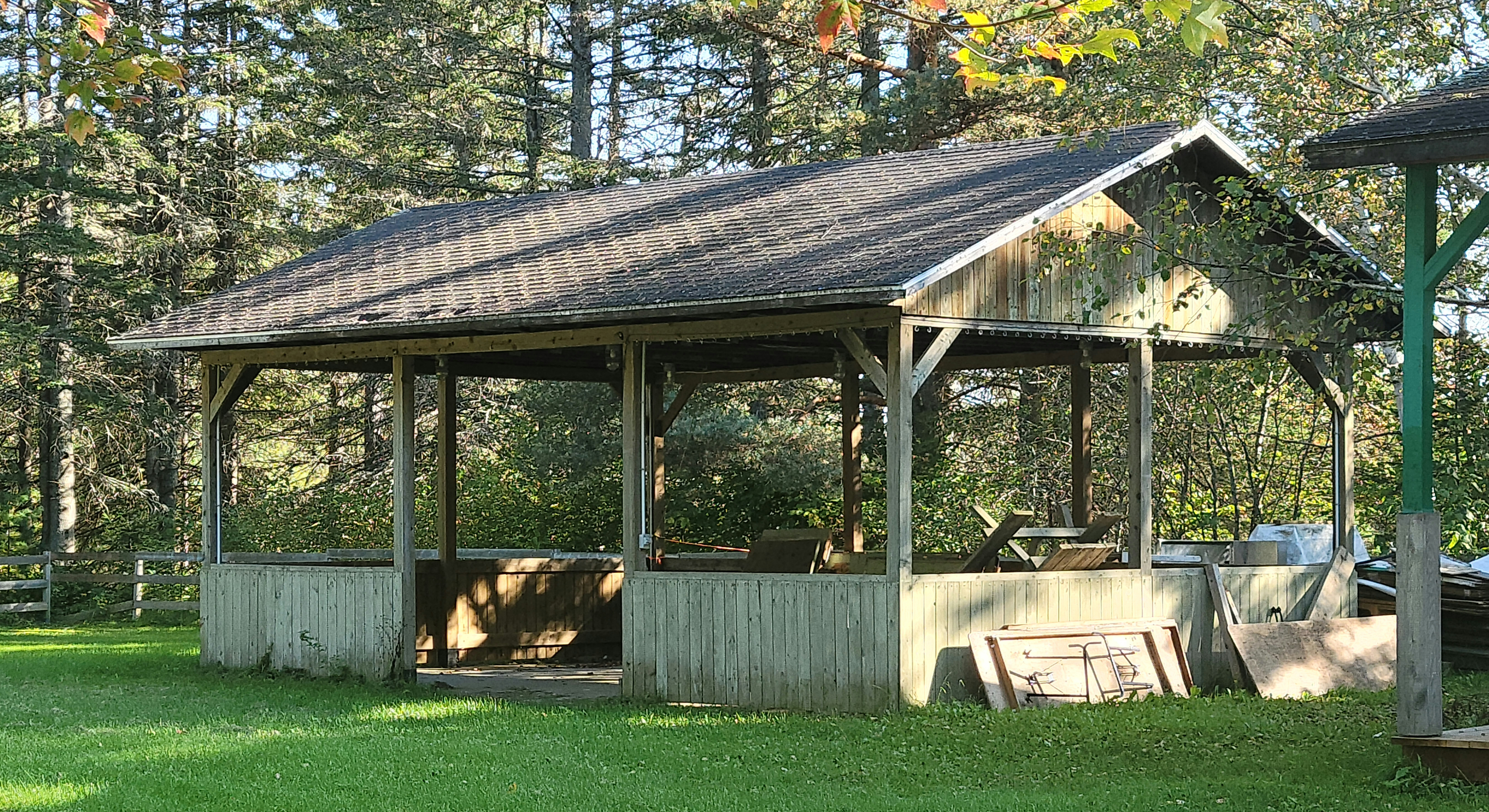
Outdoor shelter for community activities at Camp Val-Notre-Dame

The camp buildings are arranged around a loop formed by a private road; The interior of the loop is a great area for sporting activities, including soccer and ice rink, or outdoor rallies. On the 25th anniversary in 1982, the camp had dormitories, a cafeteria and a chapel. The camp was then in a fundraising campaign to renovate the chapel and other facilities. In the 1980s, there were several Canada Works projects which resulted in various improvements to the facilities. Each building and each room are identified according to a species of tree.

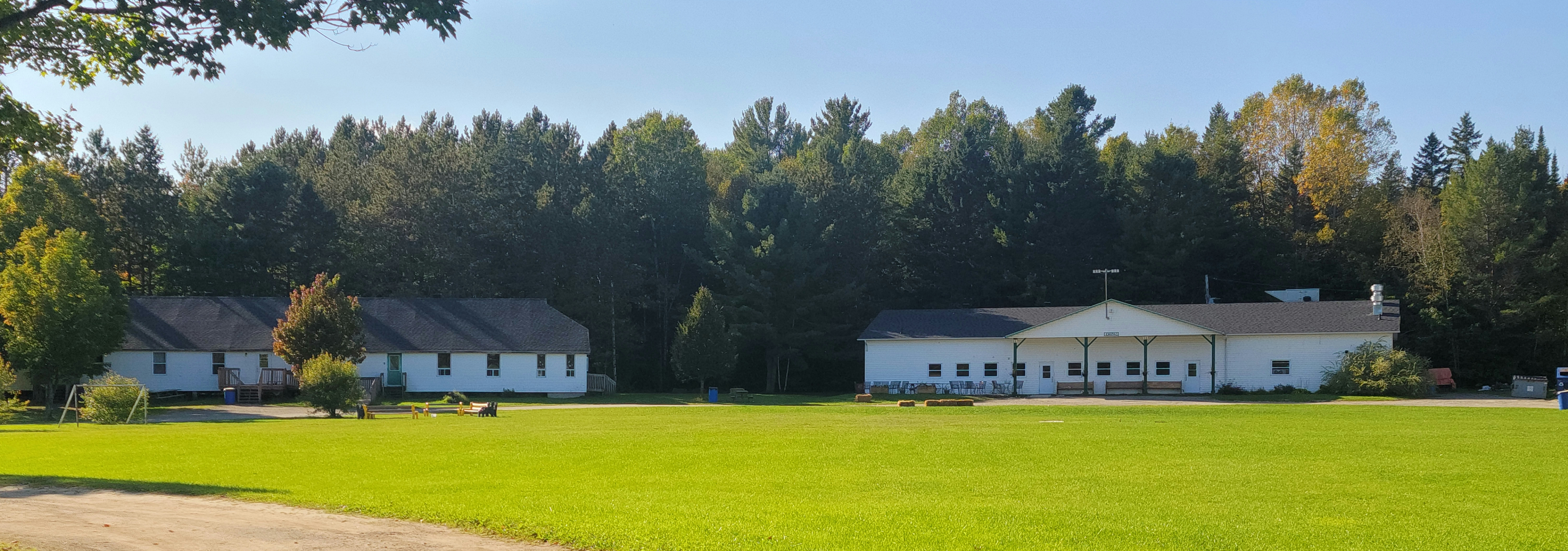
View of the cafeteria (right) and a large dormitory (left) at Camp Val-Notre-Dame

Hosting services are currently offered in:

- the two multi-family units (maximum occupancy of 12 people each) designated “Les Bouleaux”;
- the 16 cabins (from 6 to 28 places each) grouped into four buildings designated Pine, Spruce, Poplar and Aspen, built in 1990;
- Les Cèdres inn which has 7 rooms for a total capacity of 21 people. It had been refitted in 2001;
- Les Mélèzes hostel (capacity of 40 people in accommodation) is often reserved with the secondary reception hall, Les Érables (capacity of 50 people), for group stays. It had been refitted in 2002.

Meals are generally taken in the cafeteria (built in 1991), called the Les Chênes room, which has a capacity of 200 seats. While the administrative building is designated "Les Bouleaux", the reception of the camp.

== Activities and services offered ==
In the early 1980s, the camp operated 10 months a year (except December and April) with a capacity of 350 young people (aged 7 to 15) divided into small groups (one to two weeks) generally for the period from the end of June to mid-August. The camp was then directed by Brother Marcel Monette (1920-2002) and a team of 18 experienced monitors, aged 18 to 23, who were generally destined for a religious vocation. By 1984, the camp was already operating all year round. Religious services were held there regularly in the chapel until 1985.

The activities organized for young people aim to develop their team spirit, their ability, their resourcefulness and their physical resistance through a wide variety of games and activities. Often thematic activities are supervised by a team of animators.

In summer, the main activities are: swimming in the pool, water sports on the lake (canoes), cycling, hebertism, nature hikes, wild camping, archery, soccer, volleyball, softball, discovery of natural sciences, campfires, indoor games. Users can swim in a delimited area of the lake formed artificially by a dam on the Mékinac du Sud River. This lake has a small dike with sluices and a weir.

In winter, cross-country skiing, snowshoeing, tube sliding and the ice rink are very popular. Cross-country skiing and snowshoeing trails have been set up.

The camp offers a special program during the school break which usually takes place in late February or early March. It also offers a day camp in summer. The camp also offers a catering service to the public.

== History of the camp ==
Conrad Ayotte (married to Lucinda Trépanier), originally from Saint-Séverin and a leader of a Lacordaire circle, was the first to begin development of the site for recreational purposes on lots 418 and 419. He built the first wooden dam at this height on the river, locally known as the “dam à Ayotte”, thus creating Lake Ayotte. This artificial lake on the South Mékinac River was named "Ayotte Lake" after its family name.

The site was acquired on June 29, 1957 from Conrad Ayotte by the Institut des frères de Saint-Gabriel de Champlain. In 1957, the new owners immediately built a bridge over the old dam.

In July 1964, the drowning of Réjean Béland (11 years old), son of Mr. and Mrs. Paul Béland d'Hérouxville, occurred in Lake Ayotte.

The Val Notre-Dame camp was founded in 1957 by Lucien Carpentier (1912-1994), brother of St-Gabriel (religious pseudonym Brother Robert-François), from Saint-Adelphe and son of Dosithée Carpentier. Back in Mauricie in 1953, Lucien Carpentier was principal for 3 years of the Chapais school (1953-1957) of the Saint-Odilon school board, in Cap-de-la-Madeleine and principal (until 1965) of the Juniorate Notre-du-Rosaire in Champlain. He was provincial superior of the brothers of Saint-Gabriel in Champlain. He has dedicated his career to education, as a teacher and school principal. He has long been editor of magazines and newsletters for the community and for the JEC (Jeunesse Étudiante Catholique). After his career, Lucien Carpentier devoted himself from 1981 to “Aveugle à l’écoute" (Blind listening), a service for listening to the unfortunate, which he had set up after becoming blind in 1978.

As a general rule, from 1957 to 1986, the activities of Camp Val Notre-Dame were reserved for boys. From 1957 to 1970, the camp had a priestly vocation; the campers attending the Val Notre-Dame camp were generally destined for religious life. In the 1970s, summer stays were dedicated to young boys aged 8 to 13. Campers were generally recruited through offers of extracurricular activities in schools in the Mauricie run by the brothers of Saint-Gabriel, in particular: École Chapais (Cap-de-la-Madeleine), Saint-Odilon (Cap-de-la-Madeleine), Saint-Georges de Champlain (1952-1964), Juvénat Notre-Dame-du-Rosaire in Champlain, Saint-Albert (1957-1964) de Shawinigan-Sud, Collège Saint-Sauveur (1955-?), Collège Saint-Gabriel de Saint-Stanislas (1894-1972) and the Institut secondaire Montfort (Shawinigan-Sud) (1962-?).

The camp was managed from 1972 to 1982 by Brother Marcel Monette (pseudonym of Brother Alphonse-Gabriel) of the community of Brothers Saint-Gabriel. In addition to being a summer camp, the camp was initially used as a retreat for priests. In 1968, the camp had a capacity of 260 young people during the summer and Brother Julien was the camp leader.

=== 1957 to 1986 - Period of the Brothers of Saint-Gabriel ===
- 1957 - Construction of a bridge over the initial dam over the southern Mékinac river. Camp opened by the Institut des Frères de Saint-Gabriel de Champlain.
- 1960 (June 5) - Reunion of 600 people from Amicales St-Gabriel with a picnic and many outdoor activities.
- 1969 - Accreditation of the Val Notre-Dame camp by the Association des Camps du Québec.
- 1981 (August 21–30) - First edition of the Hérouxville Woods Festival held at Camp Val Notre-Dame, under the aegis of the local Optimist Club. The festival program included kiosks, archery demonstrations, sciotte and unloading competitions, in addition to a farming day and a fishing competition.
- 1982 - Celebration of the 25th anniversary of the camp with various activities. A large "25" was hung from the treetops at the top of a nearby mountain. Note: This is probably a small mountain (elevation about 18 metres (59 ft) higher than the camp site) located close to the east of the camp, as the mountain "Le Cauldron "(243 metres (797 ft)) is located 2.2 kilometres (1.4 mi) to the northwest. Connection of the camp to the municipal aqueduct network. Erection of a new concrete-gravity dam.
- 1984 - Various renovations are carried out thanks to a grant of $54,000 from the federal government.
- 1986 - No activity was organized in the summer of 1986 because the religious community was in negotiations for the cession of the camp to the organization "Rendez-vous familial Pointe St-Charles inc.".

Usually in June, the Fédération des Amicales de Saint-Gabriel or Amicale de Saint-Tite (founded in 1937 by Dr. J.G.A. Marchand) held an annual picnic; this event was held at Camp Val Notre-Dame, notably in 1960, 1961, 1981, 1983, 1984 and 1985. Usually, the Amicales des Provinces de Montréal and Champlain took part in this rallying of friends of the community of brothers, including the wives and children of former students of the Frères Saint-Gabriel. Each school run by the Brothers of Saint-Gabriel had its group of Amicales. More than 600 people participated in the 1960 one.

=== 1986 to present - Period of the "Family Rendez-vous Pointe St-Charles inc" ===
Under the aegis of the new owners, the camp grew significantly thanks to a series of government grants, which allowed for the construction of new buildings and the upgrading of facilities.

- October 1986 - Camp Val Notre-Dame is acquired by the non-profit organization “Rendez-vous familial Pointe St-Charles Inc” which was created in 1971. From now on, the activities of the camp become mixed (boys and girls) and family.
- 1987 - Announcement of an investment project of $250,000 to build four large family units (with eight bedrooms each) in the summer of 1987, as well as to renovate the entire site.
- From 1987 to 1989, the camp welcomed, in addition to families, disabled people and single children.
- 1989 - The government of Quebec grants the camp a grant of $500,000 over three years.
- Fall 1989-winter 1990 - Construction of sixteen family units in four buildings, which were used from the summer of 1990.
- Spring 1991 - Construction of a new cafeteria with a capacity of 200 places. At their annual general meeting in the fall of 1991, members of the organization inaugurated it. From now on, the general meetings of the members are still held at the camp, combined with a weekend of drudgery. The old cafeteria will now be used as a gymnasium.
- In the spring of 1996 - Installation of a swimming pool and a paddling pool for toddlers; these facilities are in operation in July. The earthworks were completed at the beginning of summer 1997.
- In the summer of 1999 - Staff inaugurate the "Les Bouleaux" building which houses all staff under one roof in the rear section; the administration at the front.
- Summer 2001 - Conversion of the "Les Cèdres" dormitory into seven family rooms to accommodate families of three people or less.
- 2002 - A camp director is hired on a permanent basis; this is Gilles Brûlé, a graduate in recreology from UQTR. This new function significantly frees up the members of the board of directors and contributes to the increase in rentals in the off-summer season.
- Winter 2004 - The "Les Mélèzes" dormitory is renovated to allow seven families of 4 people and more to stay in family rooms; the building has a large common living room.
- 2004 (May 1) - Dinner and evening commemorating the centenary of Hérouxville, to honor the five mayors of the municipality, who are still alive, among the 15 personalities who have served as mayor in history.
- 2013 - Installation of a shelter for horses and riders on the equestrian trail which passes through the Val Notre-Dame camp which actively participates in the development of equestrian tourism which then benefits from approximately 200 kilometers of trails in the MRC Mékinac.
- 2020 - Suspension since March 2020 and for an indefinite period of camp activities, following the imposition of health measures by the government to fight against the global pandemic of the Coronavirus Covid-19. Consequently, in May 2020, at the initiative of Director General Gilles Brûlé, the camp offered its kitchens to a meals-on-wheels service to feed people in need; meals are delivered to homes by volunteers.

== Toponymy ==
The toponyms "camp Val Notre-Dame" and "lac Ayotte" have not yet been formalized by the Commission de toponymie du Québec. The name of the camp is associated with the cult dedicated to Notre-Dame, within the community of the brothers of Saint-Gabriel and in Christendom.

== Appendices ==
=== Bibliography ===
- Official site of Camp Val Notre-Dame
- Press review of the history of Camp Val Notre-Dame, compiled in 2020 by historian Gaétan Veillette.

=== Related Articles ===
- Hérouxville, a municipality
- South Mékinac River
- Brothers of Saint-Gabriel, a religious congregation
- List of summer camps
