= South Mékinac River =

River in Quebec (Canada)

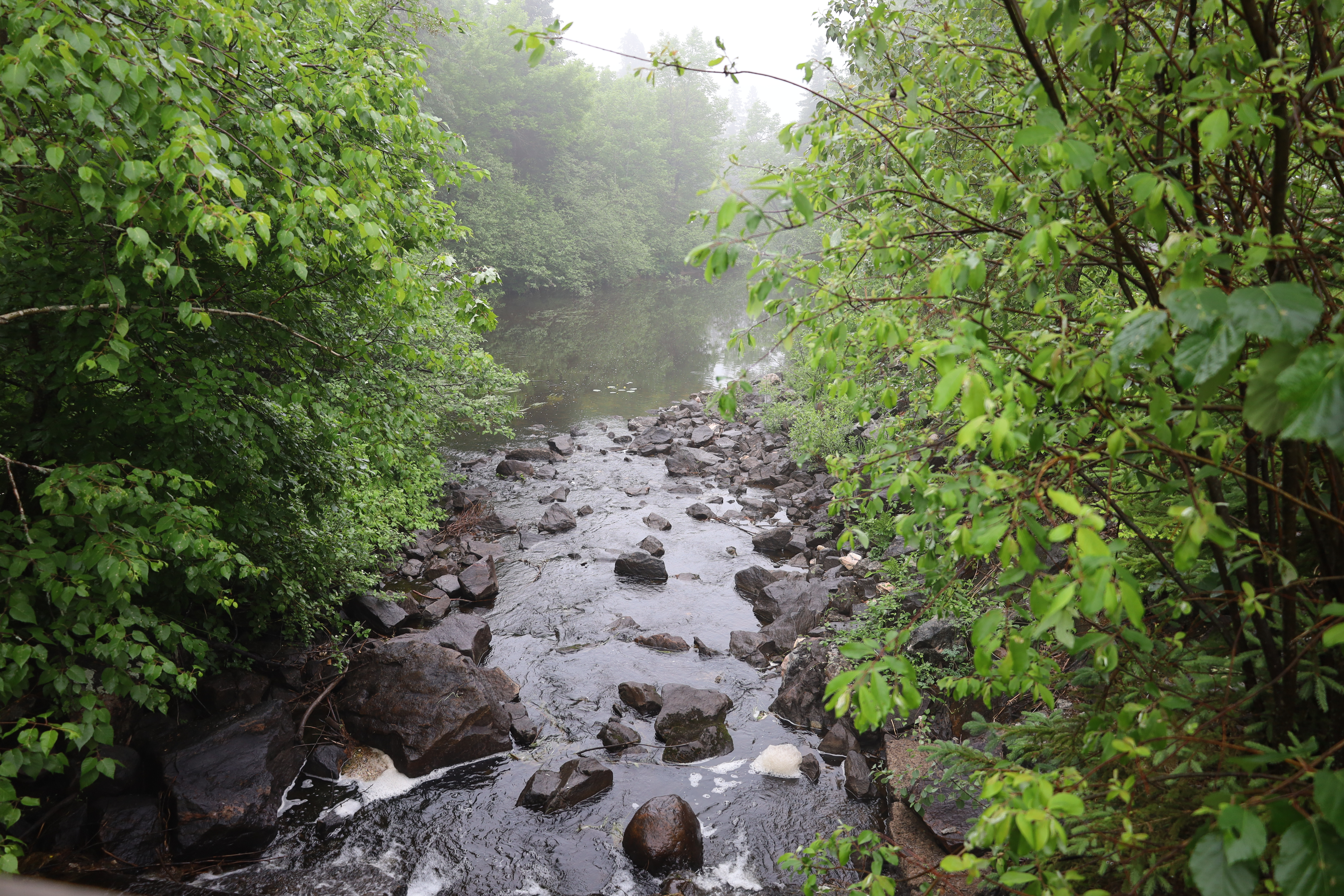
- Petit lac du Castor Road, Hérouxville

- Location within Quebec

Location
- Country: Canada
- Province: Quebec
- Region: Mauricie
- Regional County Municipality: Mékinac Regional County Municipality

Physical characteristics
- Source: Lake Gabriel
  - location: Grandes-Piles
  - coordinates: 46.751725°N 72.694965°W
  - elevation: 292 m (958 ft)
- Mouth: North Mékinac River
  - location: Saint-Tite
  - coordinates: 49°49′51″N 64°22′41″W
  - elevation: 138 m (453 ft)
- Length: 17.8 km (11.1 mi)

Basin features
- River system: Nivo-pluvial
- Tributaries
  - left: (upstream) Discharge from a small lake, discharge from a lake, discharge from a lake, discharge from two streams (via Lac Tessier), discharge from two small lakes (via Lac des Caribous).
  - right: (upstream) Ruisseau Rouille, ruisseau non identifié, décharge du lac du Castor (via le Lac à la Truite), décharge de deux petits lacs (via le Lac à la Truite).

The Rivière Mékinac du Sud (English: South Mékinac River) is a watercourse flowing from Grandes-Piles to Saint-Tite and Hérouxville in Mékinac Regional County Municipality (RCM), Mauricie, administrative region, Quebec, Canada.

== Geography ==
This river has two main sources in the Laurentian Mountains, at Grandes-Piles:

- Lake Gabriel, whose waters flow successively into Lac de la Bouteille and Lac à la Truite. Between the mouth of lac Gabriel and the north bay of lac à la Truite, the waters descend on 2.9 kilometres (1.8 mi); the water then crosses this last lake over its entire length, i.e. 900 metres (3,000 ft).
- the two Jean-Baptiste lakes, whose waters flow successively into Lac des Caribous, a small unidentified lake, Lac Gagnon (580 metres (1,900 ft)) and Lac à la Truite (900 metres (3,000 ft) in length including the bay to the north and 700 in width). The latter lake also receives the waters of Castor Lake on the southwest side. Between the mouth of Lac Jean-Baptiste (the highest) and the mouth of Trout Lake, the current descends on 4.4 kilometres (2.7 mi), including a 300 metres (980 ft) course, crossing this last lake.

Upper course

From Lac à la Truite, the waters descend for a kilometre to empty into Lac Tavibois (length: 400 metres (1,300 ft); altitude: 205 metres (673 ft)) at Grandes-Piles, located in the Tavibois area. A retention dam has been built at its mouth with automated control of the water level; this dam is located on the boundary between Grandes-Piles and Hérouxville. After this dam, the water crosses a fall to flow 50 metres (160 ft) further southeast into Lake Léo (length: 140 metres (460 ft); altitude: 186 metres (610 ft)) which has a small dam at its mouth. This lake flows eastwards into Tessier lake (length: 0.84 kilometres (0.52 mi); 181 metres (594 ft)) that the current crosses on 1.0 kilometre (0.62 mi) towards the North. The lake collects a stream (coming from the north) which drains the western slope of Le Chaudron mountain (altitude: 173 metres (568 ft)) which straddles the limit of Saint-Tite and Hérouxville, almost at the limit from Grandes-Piles.

From the dam at the mouth of Lake Tessier, the current heads northeast over 0.5 kilometres (0.31 mi), towards Le Chaudron mountain, before turning southeast to descend on 0.4 kilometres (0.25 mi) crossing Chemin des Petites-Forges, up to a stream (coming from the northeast). From there, the course of the river heads south on 1.6 kilometres (0.99 mi) first by forming serpentines, then crossing the Petit lac du Castor (length: 0.6 kilometres (0.37 mi); altitude: 174 metres (571 ft)) and very narrow), to the dam located at its mouth, south of the lake. About thirty chalets surround the Petit lac du Castor.

From this last dam, the current descends towards the south-east, crosses towards the north a small narrow lake (length: 0.9 kilometres (0.56 mi); altitude: 164 metres (538 ft)) to the small dam at its mouth. From there, the current flows on 1.65 kilometres (1.03 mi) eastward, forming two hooks, one north, the other south, to the discharge (coming from the north) of a lake. Then the current goes to 2.4 kilometres (1.5 mi), first over 0.8 kilometres (0.50 mi) south to a stream (coming from the south), then on 1.0 kilometre (0.62 mi) eastward crossing Lake Ayotte (length: 0.7 kilometres (0.43 mi); altitude: 151 metres (495 ft)) whose dam is located in the camp Val Notre-Dame, then on 0.6 kilometres (0.37 mi) south-east to the mouth of Ruille stream (coming from the south).

Lower course

From there, the river heads northeast on 650 metres (2,130 ft) where it crosses the Saint-Tite boundary. Then the river crosses another 2.5 kilometres (1.6 mi) in the zone to cut the route 159. And the mouth of the Mékinac du Sud river is 200 metres (660 ft) further away, as the water flows into the North Mékinac River.

On most of its route, approximately 13.2 kilometres (8.2 mi) (measured by water) from the mouth of lac à la Truite (or 17.9 kilometres (11.1 mi) from lac Jean-Baptiste), the river flows mainly in a forest environment. In short, the river runs 6.1 kilometres (3.8 mi) in Grandes-Piles, 9.2 kilometres (5.7 mi) in Hérouxville because of the streamers and 2.7 kilometres (1.7 mi) in Saint-Tite.

== Toponymy ==
The toponym Rivière Mékinac du Sud was formalized on December 5, 1968, at the Place Names Bank of the Commission de toponymie du Québec.

== Photos ==
South Mékinac River

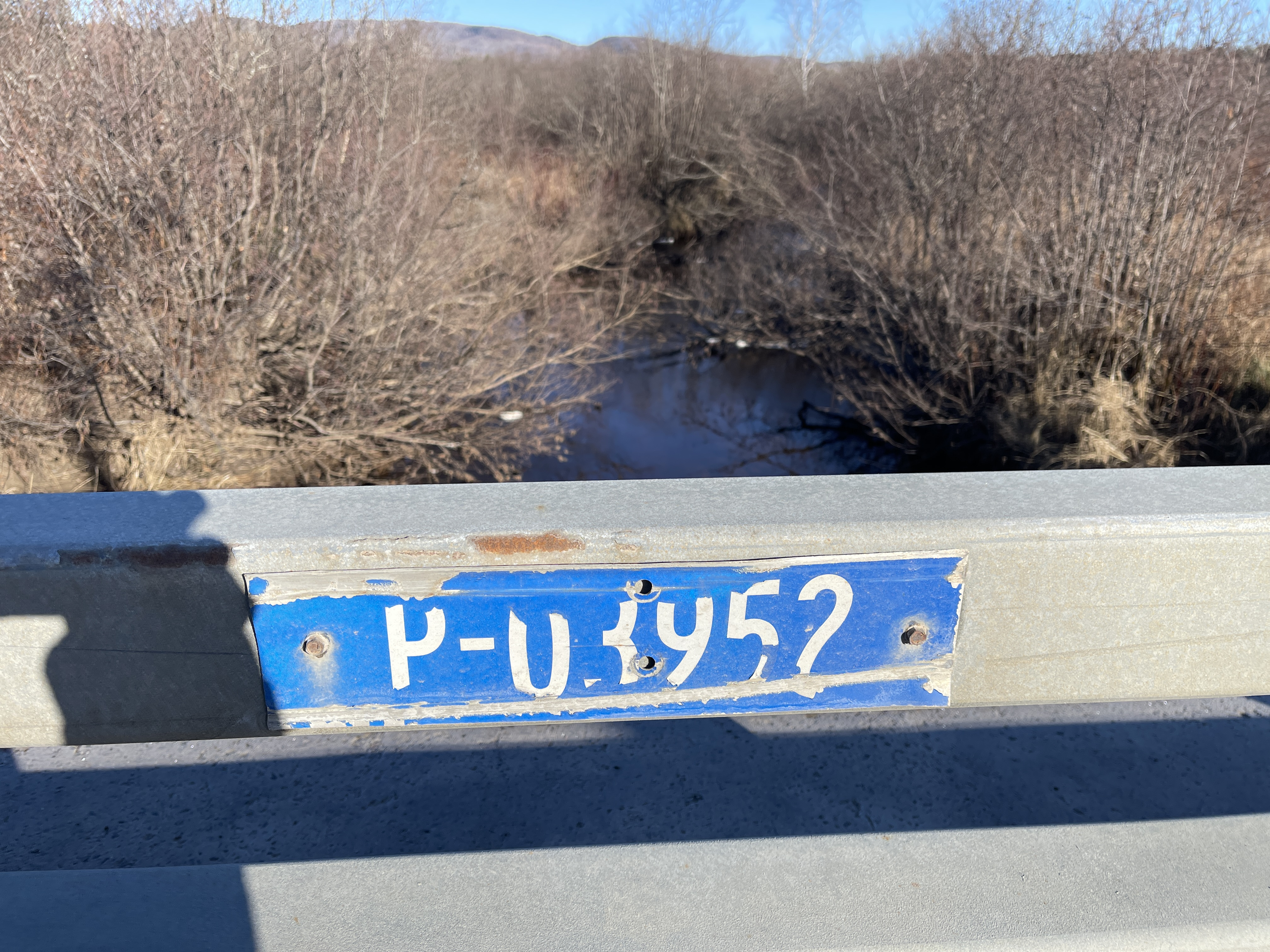
Sign on Bridge P-03952, reinforced concrete gantry, under embankment (1948), Quebec Route 359, Saint-Tite

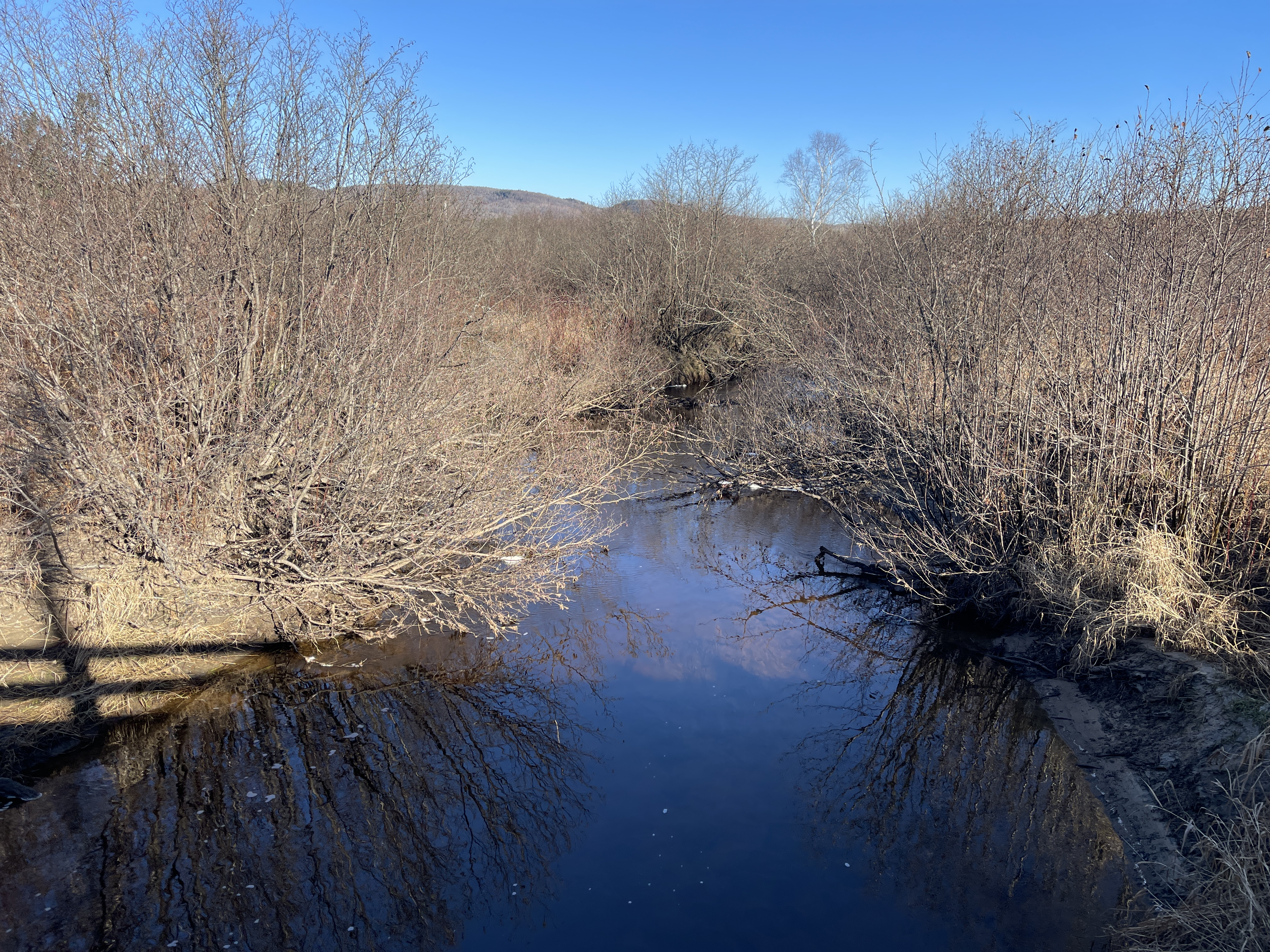
From bridge P-03952, reinforced concrete gantry, under embankment (1948), Quebec Route 359, Saint-Tite

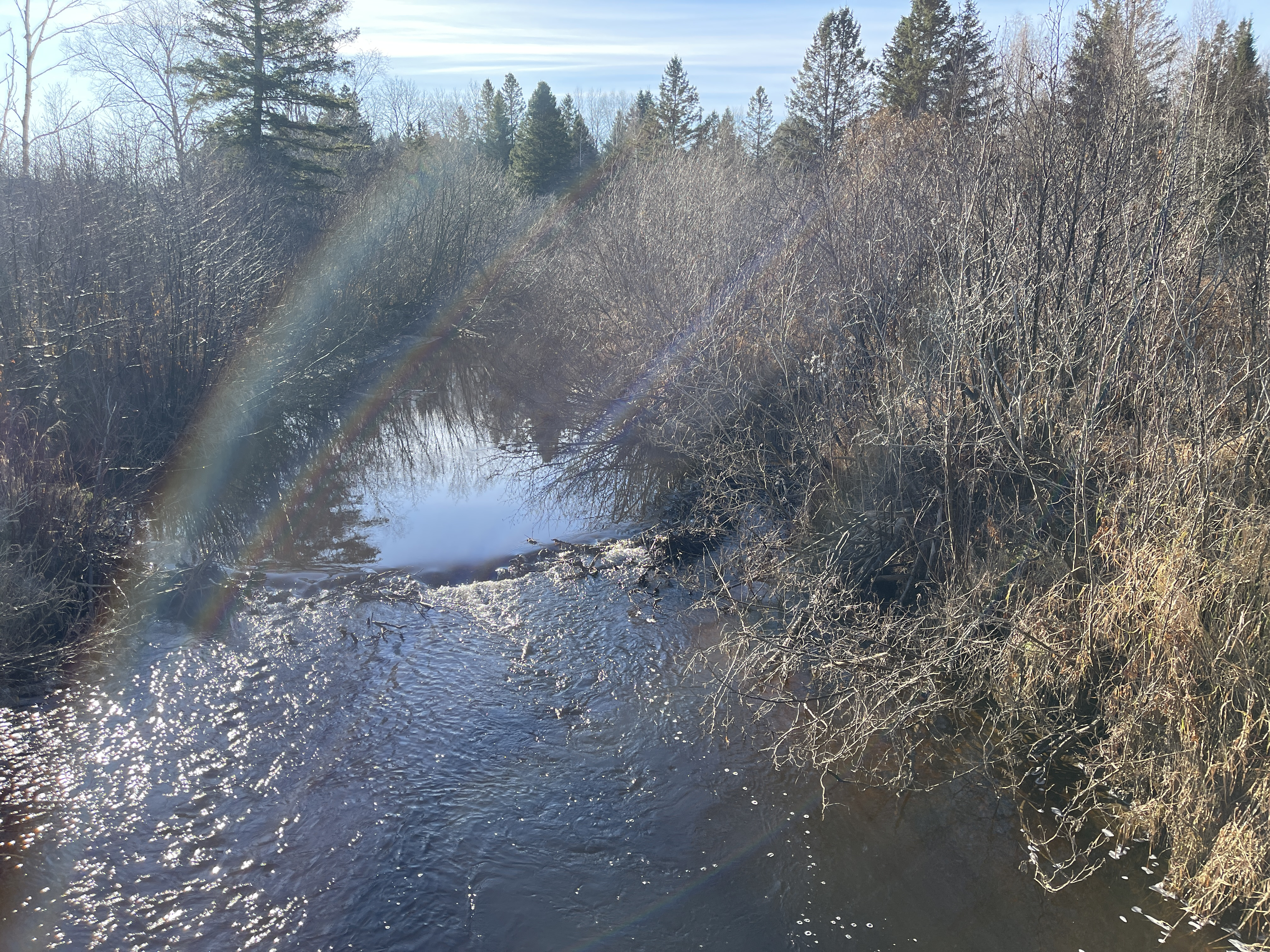
From bridge P-03952, reinforced concrete gantry, under embankment (1948), Quebec Route 359, Saint-Tite

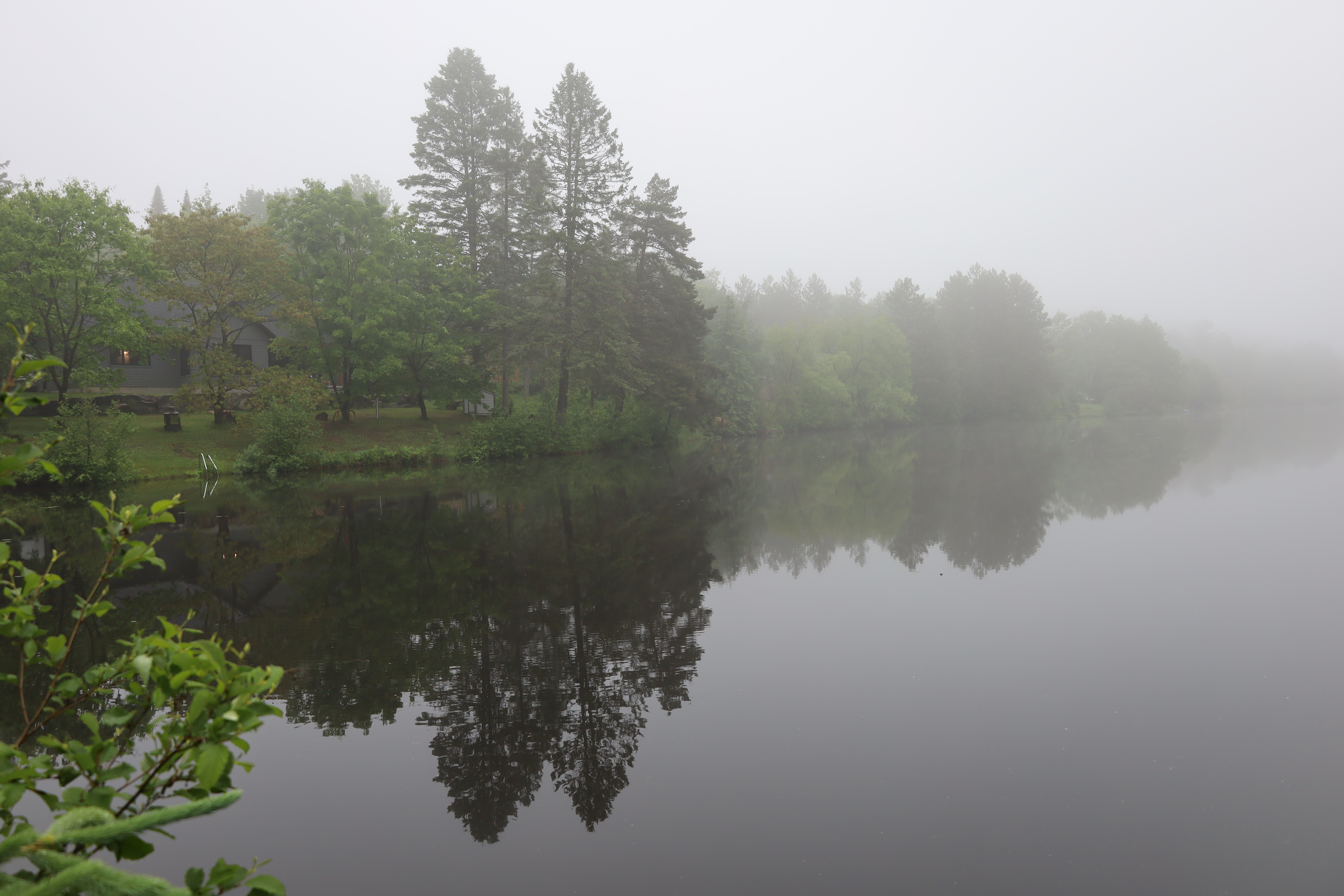
Chemin du Petit lac du Castor, Hérouxville

== Appendices ==
=== See also ===
- List of rivers of Quebec
