= Daughters of Jesus =

French Roman Catholic congregation of religious sisters

The Daughters of Jesus (French: Filles de Jésus) is a French Roman Catholic congregation of religious sisters, founded in 1834 at Kermaria-Sulard, Brittany, in the Diocese of Vannes. Its goal is the care of the sick poor, and the education of girls. Today their motto is "Following Jesus on the road of human life."

== History ==
=== Foundations ===
==== A foresighted pastor ====
The roots of the congregation lay in the vision of Pierre Noury (1743–1804), who had studied at a Jesuit college, then in a seminary run by the Vincentian Fathers. He was appointed pastor of Bignan, Morbihan, in Brittany in 1771. There he preached to the population frequently, gaining such a positive reputation among the townspeople that, after many years as pastor, he was elected mayor of the town in 1790.

During this time, Noury conceived of establishing a small community of women who would lead lives in common of prayer and charitable works. His vision, however, could not be realized as he had to flee France due to the French Revolution. During his time in exile, Noury composed many works in the Breton language, including a book of sermons and a Bible.

Noury returned to Bignan after the end of the French Terror, only to find a populace shattered and impoverished. He was soon transferred by the bishop to the cathedral in Vannes, where he died in 1804. He left his belongings to two women who had shared his vision and who ran a small school for years after his death.

==== A dedicated founder ====
A new pastor, Coëffic, came to Bignan in 1821. He learned of Noury's envisioned community and began to commit himself to implementing it. He came to know Perrine Samsom (1790–1847) who had been born in a rural hamlet of the parish. Samsom was a member of the Third Order of St. Francis, who committed herself to the service of the needy about her, nursing the sick, teaching young children the Breton language, leading prayer in the hamlet when no priest had been available during the troubled times of the Revolution.

In 1829 Coëffic invited Samsom to come to the town and direct a school for boys, with the hope that she might fully embrace Noury's vision of a dedicated community of women serving the needs of the town. Samsom accepted the challenge, eventually being joined by four other women who wished to share in this. In December 1831, they began a formal novitiate under Coëffic's supervision. The five women made their profession on 25 November 1834, thereby establishing the Daughters of Jesus as a religious institute in the Catholic Church.

Soon other women joined them, and new communities of Sisters were established in the neighboring parishes of Morbihan, in answer to the requests for them. Samsom, who had taken the religious name of Sainte Angèle, was appointed as the first Superior General of the new congregation, and is considered the founder of the congregation. She did not care for the authority entrusted to her, and as soon as a suitable replacement was found, she retired as Superior, sharing the ordinary duties of the community until her death.

=== Expansion ===
The congregation received recognition by the French government on 31 October 1842. The year prior to that, Angelique Perigualt (1820–1887) had entered the congregation, taking the name of Marie of Saint Charles. She was elected as Superior General in 1846, a position in which she would serve until her death. She established the principles of service in community and a true simplicity of life which allowed for the freedom to serve.

Under her leadership, the congregation grew from 60 sisters to over 600. A new and larger motherhouse was established in a neighboring town. Additional communities were established throughout France.

The Daughters of Jesus then began to establish themselves outside France. In 1893 a provincial house for Canada was founded at Trois-Rivières, Quebec. The sisters of the Congregation of the Daughters of Jesus, whose influence was limited in France by the law on congregations of 1880, were forced into exile at the beginning of the twentieth century by virtue of the law of 1901. The congregation then counted in France around a thousand sisters spread over 80 communities and 134 schools7. In 1903, for example, more than 100 nuns left Brittany for Canada, settling in Alberta in Saint-Albert, Calgary, Edmonton; in New Brunswick to Chatam, Bathurst and Dalhousie; in Nova Scotia in Arichat and Sidney; in Prince Edward Island in Charlottetown, etc., but mainly in Quebec (around twenty foundations, for example in Trois-Rivières: Cap-de-la-Madeleine, Batiscan, Saint-Prosper, Saint-Narcisse, Shawinigan, etc.).

In the United States, for many years they conducted an academy and hospital at Lewistown, Montana, and ran the school connected with the French-speaking Parish of St-Jean-Baptiste in Waltham, Massachusetts.

This pattern of growth was interrupted in 1904, when an anti-clerical French government forced many religious communities into exile. The Daughters of Jesus were not spared, and communities were also established in Belgium, England and Canada as places of refuge.

Later, in the 1950s, in response to the appeals of the bishops of the developing world, the Daughters opened houses in Africa, the Antilles and South America.

== Today ==
Currently, the Daughters of Jesus serve in France, Belgium, Cameroon, Canada, Chile, Colombia, the Democratic Republic of the Congo, Dominica, England and Honduras. A community of Daughters was opened in Northern Ireland in 1968 and closed in 2011.

That same year, on 1 July, the Daughters of Jesus of Brittany merged with an older congregation of the same name founded in 1820 in Vaylats in southern France. The motherhouse of the other congregation lies on the ancient pilgrimage route to Santiago de Compostela, and is one of the sites which has given hospitality to the pilgrims making this journey for a millennium.

== Sources ==
- The entry cites:
  - Max Heimbucher, Orden und Kongregationen (Paderborn, 1908);
  - Le Canada ecclesiastique (1910)
