= Lake Roberge (Grandes-Piles) =

Lake in Grandes-Piles, Quebec, Canada

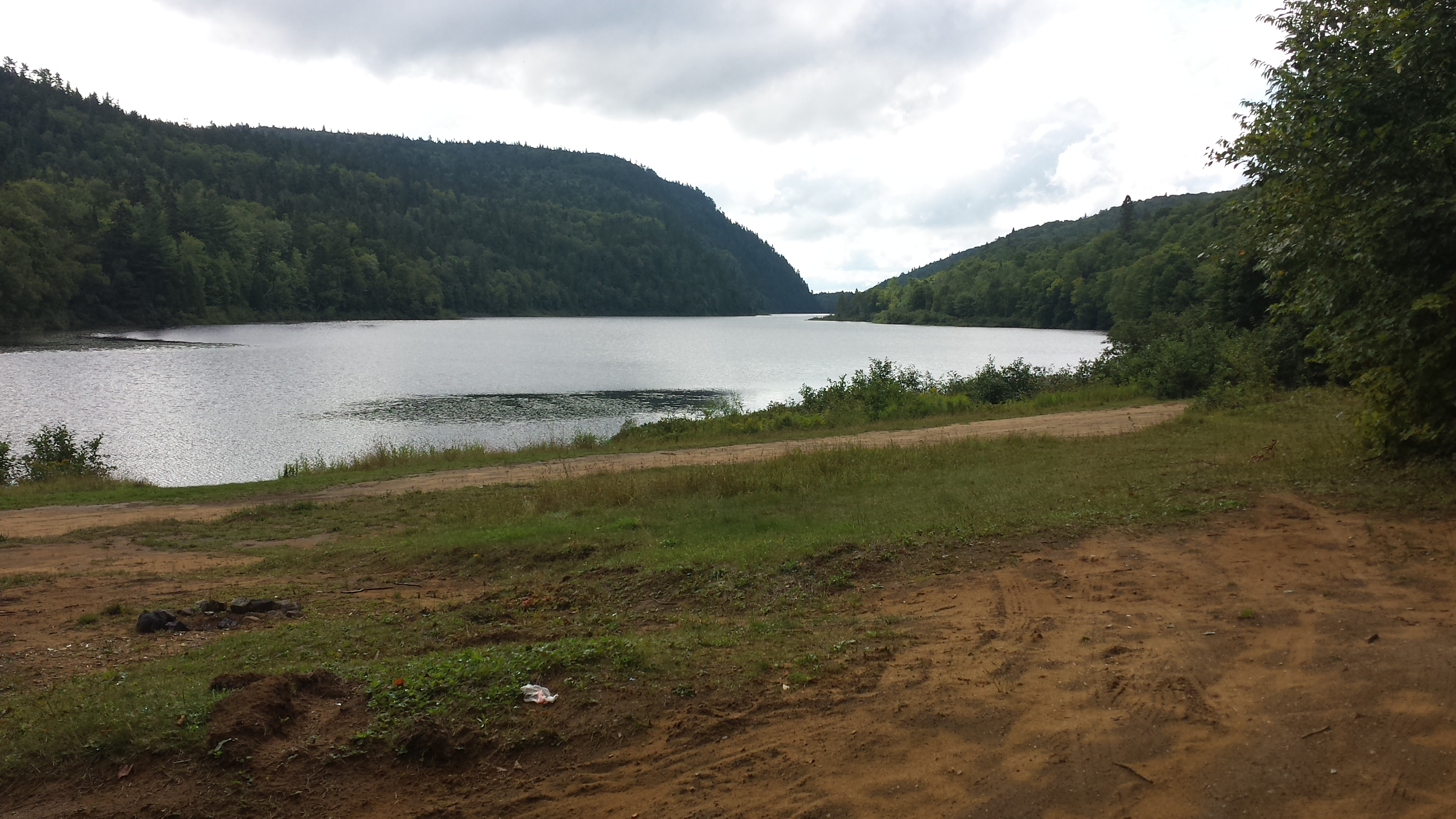
- South part of Lake Roberge (Grandes-Piles, Quebec) located in a narrow valley.

- "Lake Roberge (Grandes-Piles)" in Batiscanie, in Quebec
- Location: Grandes-Piles, Mauricie
- Coordinates: 46°45′58″N 72°40′30″W
- Lake type: Natural
- Primary outflows: North Mékinac River
- Basin countries: Canada
- Max. length: 3.4 km (2.1 mi)
- Max. width: 0.2 km (0.12 mi)

Lake Roberge is located in the municipality of Grandes-Piles, in the MRC Mekinac Regional County Municipality, in Mauricie, in Quebec, in Canada.

== Geography ==
Very elongated and narrow shape, lake Roberge (Grandes-Piles) is 3.4 kilometres (2.1 mi) of length in the northwest axis to the southeast. The maximum width is 200 m. in northern section. The lake is divided into four sections; the most important is the section of the South. Lake Roberge Valley (Grandes-Piles) is embedded between mountains in the territory of Grandes-Piles, almost at the limit of Saint-Roch-de-Mékinac.

From the mouth of Lake Roberge (located at the south end of the lake), the North Mékinac River flowing in forest area to the southeast on 6.1 kilometres (3.8 mi) (relatively in straight line, except for a few curves) to the boundary of Saint-Tite. This river flows into the Rivière des Envies, in the territory of Saint-Tite.

A segment of the Route 159 in Saint-Tite and Saint-Roch-de-Mékinac, is along the entire lake south-east. This valley is a must to travel between the area of the Saint-Maurice River and Rivière des Envies (in Saint-Tite).

The "Second Roberge Lake" is located in the territory of Saint-Roch-de-Mékinac, one km northwest of Lake Roberge (Grandes-Piles), in the same valley. This second lake Roberge is part of the watershed of the Saint-Maurice River.

The "Fountain Lake Road" connects to the Route 159 between these two lakes. The "Fountain Lake road" goes to the north-east and connects to "Joseph Saint-Amant road" in Sainte-Thècle. "Fountain Lake Road" serves a series of lakes in Grandes-Piles, including the "lake Équerre", "lake fountain", "Little lake Dorval", lake Nicolas and "lac à Pierre".

The "chemin du lac des îles (Island Lake Road)" that connects to Route 159 at the intersection of path Fountain Lake runs south to serve the Lake Clair, the "Lake of the Isles" and some other small lakes. In parallel, the "path of Clear Lake" serves the eastern part of the lake of the same name.

== History ==
In the story, "Fountain Lake Road" and "Joseph Saint-Amant road" were vital for cutting and transporting timber, the resort and the tourist activities including hunting and fishing.

== Topononymie ==
Bank of place names of Commission de toponymie du Québec (Geographical Names Board of Québec) reports 17 toponyms "Lake Roberge" in Quebec. In general, these toponyms have an ethnocentric origin, being associated with people using surname Roberge.

The name "Lake Roberge" (Grandes-Piles) was officially registered on December 5, 1968, at the Bank of place names of Commission de toponymie du Québec (Geographical Names Board of Québec)

== See also ==
- Mekinac Regional County Municipality
- Grandes-Piles
- Saint-Tite
- Saint-Roch-de-Mékinac
- Rivière des Envies
- Batiscanie, Quebec
- North Mékinac River
