= Grandes-Piles =

- Village municipality
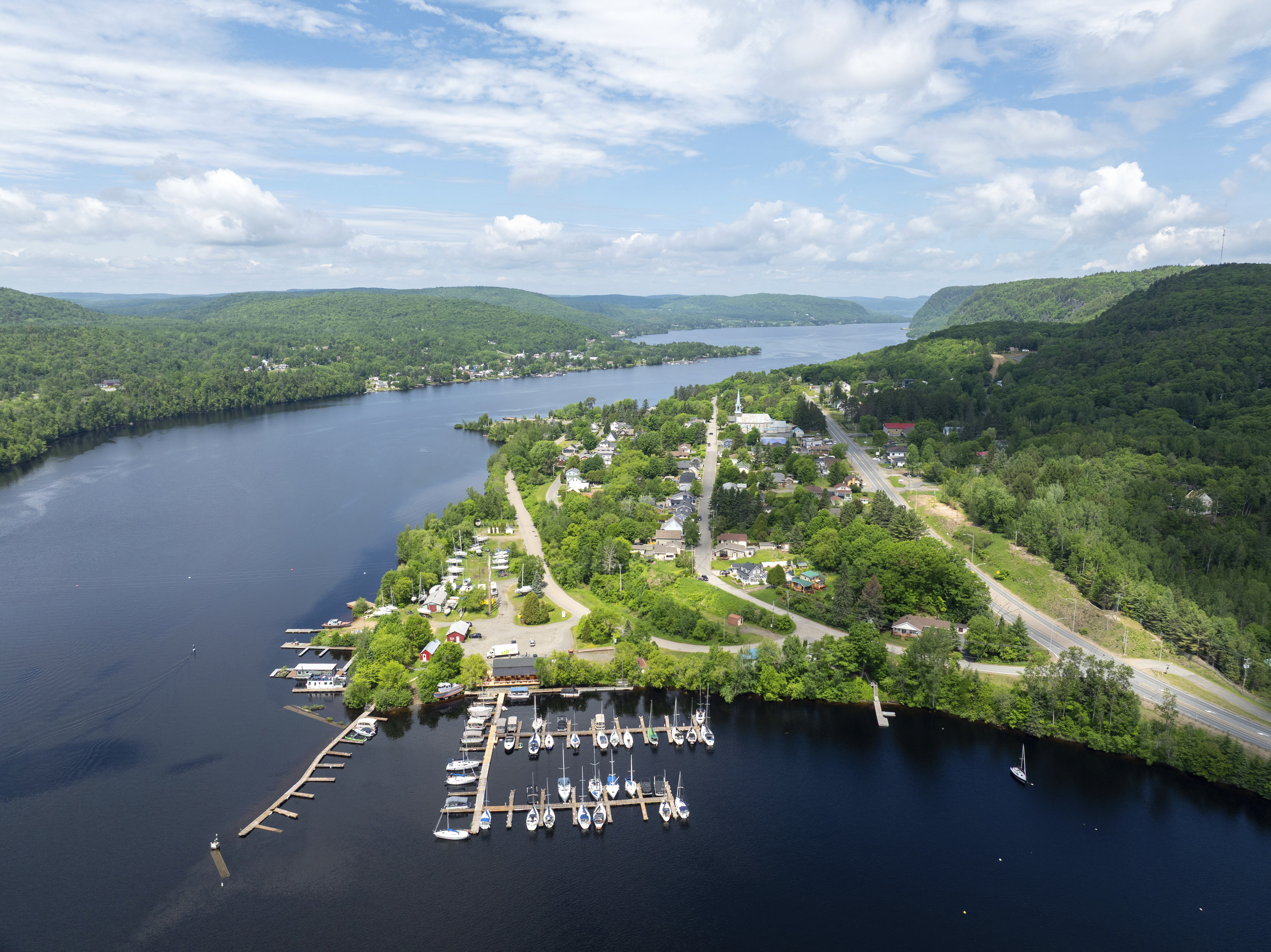
- Grandes-Piles in 2026

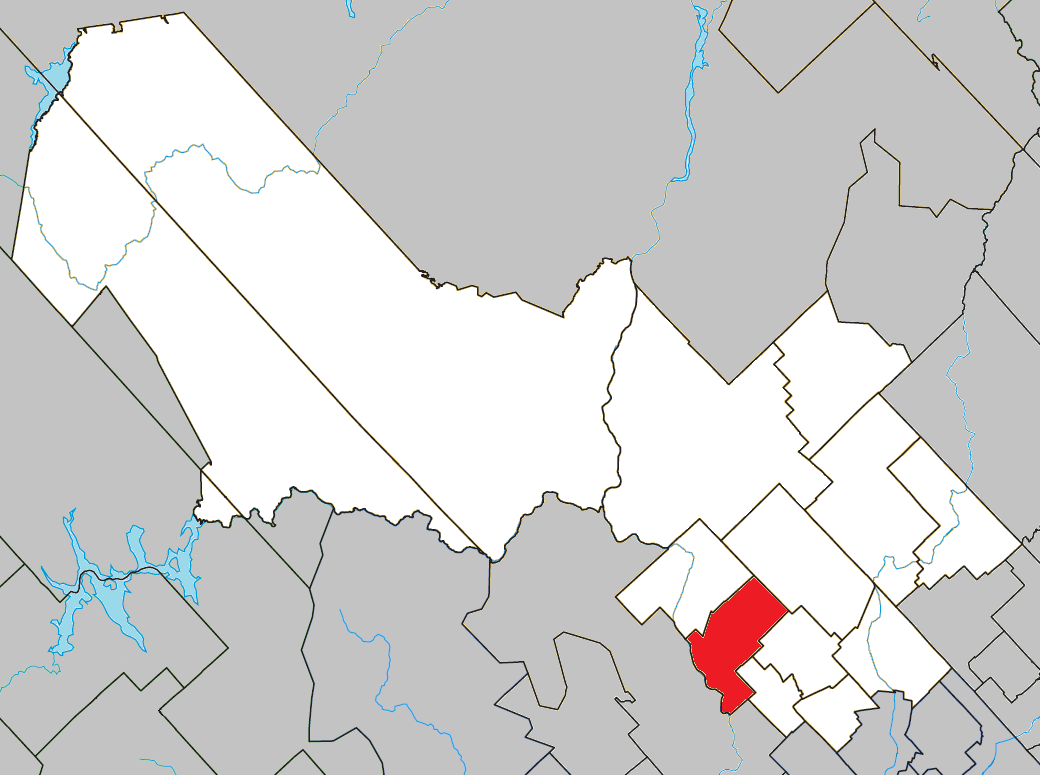
- Location within Mékinac RCM

- Location in central Quebec
- Coordinates: 46°41′N 72°44′W
- Country: Canada
- Province: Quebec
- Region: Mauricie
- RCM: Mékinac
- Settled: c. 1850
- Constituted: August 10, 1885

Government
  - Mayor: Caroline Clément
  - Fed. riding: Saint-Maurice—Champlain
  - Prov. riding: Laviolette

Area
  - Total: 120.34 km^{2} (46.46 sq mi)
  - Land: 116.97 km^{2} (45.16 sq mi)

Population (2021)
  - Total: 493
  - Density: 4.2/km^{2} (11/sq mi)
  - Change2016-21: ▲18.8%
  - Dwellings: 324
- Time zone: UTC−5 (EST)
  - Summer (DST): UTC−4 (EDT)
- Postal code(s): G0X 1H0
- Area code: 819
- Highways: R-155; R-159
- Census profile
- MAMROT info: 35040
- Toponymie info: 228457
- Website: www.grandespiles.com

Grandes-Piles (French pronunciation: [ɡʁɑ̃d pil]) is a village municipality in the Mauricie region of the province of Quebec in Canada.

The name of Grandes-Piles (literally "large piles") has uncertain origin. One of the best-known but false explanations is that it referred to a stack of entangled logs on the rocks of the Saint-Maurice that inspired the early settlers. Another explanation claims that it referred to the large rocks used by the indigenous Americans to grind grain. It may also refer to the stack of stratums, horizontal sedimentary layers that are exposed in this part of the Mauricie.

It is twinned with the city of Clamecy, Nièvre in France since 1996.

== History ==
The first settlers of Grandes-Piles arrived circa 1850 and were drawn to the area because of the large stands of white and red pine. In 1852, the Norcross & Philips Company obtained the logging rights there. From 1852 to 1855, the Saint-Maurice River from La Tuque to Trois-Rivières was dredged and prepared for log driving, and Grandes-Piles became the gateway to lumberjacks and log drivers. In 1878, the village's first sawmill was built, followed by an industrial boom which led to the construction of a railway between Trois-Rivières and Grandes-Piles.

In 1882, the post office opened. In 1885, the village was incorporated as the Parish Municipality of Saint-Jacques-des-Piles, named in honour of Jacques Buteux. At that time, it was the main transportation hub for the interior areas of the Mauricie since it was located at the head of navigation on the Saint-Maurice, and had warehouses and rail access. In 1890, 14 coal furnaces were installed and iron was produced in the town until 1920. In 1925, the road to Saint-Jacques-des-Piles was built.

In 1966, Saint-Jacques-des-Piles was renamed to Grandes-Piles, and in 1988, it changed its status to Village Municipality. In 1997, the Compagnie de flottage du St-Maurice, the company responsible for log driving on the Saint-Maurice, ceased operations and the industrial waterfront of Grandes-Piles was reclaimed for tourism.

== Geography ==
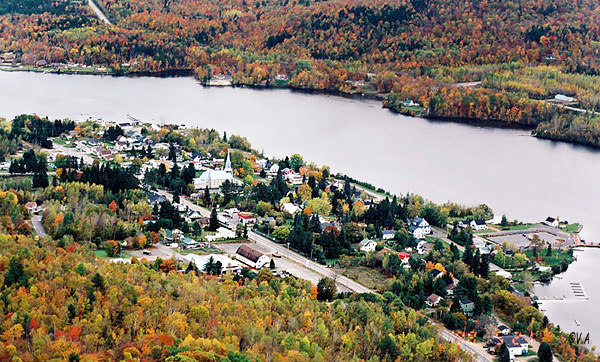
Aerial view of Grandes-Piles and the St-Maurice River

Located in Radnor Township, this small village is located on a cliff to the north of Grand-Mère, overlooking the Saint-Maurice River on the east bank. The village faces the village of Saint-Jean-des-Piles. Once annually ice bridge connecting the two villages were built from December to March. The northwestern part of the municipality faces the La Mauricie National Park, located on the west bank of the Saint-Maurice River.

This town was the birthplace of log driving in Mauricie, which stopped in 1996 after 150 years. Grandes-Piles proved to be a historic landmark in the forestry industry. Since 1996, the reopening of the waterway free of floating logs, the Saint-Maurice River offers to boaters a large choice for water sports and a paradise for sailing. In winter, the frozen river and snowy cliffs and forest become a huge area for winter sports. Boating is generally done well between the dam of Grand-Mère and the dam of La Tuque, especially when the water is high.

The lakes of the municipal flow into one of the three following rivers:

- Saint-Maurice River: creek of islands (water coming from the "Lac des Îles"), creek of Jacob (from lakes Cordon and Doris), creek Marcouiller (from Lake Marcouiller) and creek Denoncourt (draining the lake Laing, and the zone at north of the village);
- North Mékinac River: emissary of Lake Roberge (Grandes-Piles) and draining water from the territory at north of Sainte-Thècle and Saint-Roch-de-Mékinac and Grandes-Piles, including Clair Lake;
- South Mékinac River: whose head water lakes in Grandes-Piles are in mountainous regions: Gabriel Lake, Beaver Lake, Lake Trout, Gagnon Lake, Caribou Lake, Lake of the bottle, and the two lakes Jean-Baptiste. This river flows through the Tavibois center which is arranged on the boundary between the territory of Grandes-Piles and Hérouxville. Then this river quenches the "creek Rouille" before heading north-east to join the North Mékinac River in Saint-Tite. The summit of the mountain between Gabriel lake and Marcouiller lake is located just two kilometers from the Saint-Maurice River. It is the same case for the mountain between creek Jacob and Marcouiller lake. The line of the watershed between the Saint-Maurice River and Batiscan River pass through these summits. Thus, despite its proximity to the Saint-Maurice River, much of the territory of Grandes-Piles is part of the watershed of the Batiscanie.

Archange Lake is on the border of Grandes-Piles and Sainte-Thècle.

== Demographics ==
In the 2021 Census of Population conducted by Statistics Canada, Grandes-Piles had a population of 493 living in 258 of its 324 total private dwellings, a change of 18.8% from its 2016 population of 415. With a land area of 116.97 km^{2} (45.16 sq mi), it had a population density of 4.2/km^{2} (10.9/sq mi) in 2021.

Canada census – Grandes-Piles community profile

	2021	2016	2011
Population	493 (+18.8% from 2016)	415 (+15.0% from 2011)	361 (+3.1% from 2006)
Land area	116.97 km^{2} (45.16 sq mi)	120.61 km^{2} (46.57 sq mi)	120.66 km^{2} (46.59 sq mi)
Population density	4.2/km^{2} (11/sq mi)	3.4/km^{2} (8.8/sq mi)	3.0/km^{2} (7.8/sq mi)
Median age	57.6 (M: 58.4, F: 57.6)	57.0 (M: 57.2, F: 55.5)	52.2 (M: 51.8, F: 53.2)
Private dwellings	324 (total) 258 (occupied)	275 (total)	234 (total)
Median household income	$70,500	$49,280	$44,634

References: 2021 2016 2011

Historical census populations – Grandes-Piles

Year	Pop.	±%
1891	791	—
1901	626	−20.9%
1911	682	+8.9%
1921	548	−19.6%
1931	580	+5.8%
1941	629	+8.4%
1951	571	−9.2%

Year	Pop.	±%
1956	588	+3.0%
1961	580	−1.4%
1966	547	−5.7%
1971	495	−9.5%
1976	459	−7.3%
1981	455	−0.9%
1986	415	−8.8%

Year	Pop.	±%
1991	363	−12.5%
1996	371	+2.2%
2001	374	+0.8%
2006	350	−6.4%
2011	361	+3.1%
2016	415	+15.0%
2021	493	+18.8%

Source: Statistics Canada

Mother tongue (2021):

- English as first language: 2.0%
- French as first language: 97.0%
- English and French as first languages: 0%
- Other as first language: 1.0%

== Attractions ==
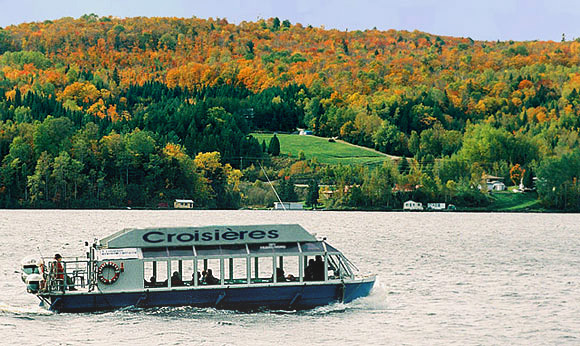
River cruise

Grandes-Piles reserve several attractions for visitors on the East banks of the Saint-Maurice River:

- The Musée du Bûcheron (Museum of lumberjack) (forested village) is a major touristic destination in Mauricie, tells the story of the log drive and the region. Located in the village of Grandes-Piles, the museum covers a hundred years of history (1850–1950) through a tour of 25 thematic camps related to different dependencies of a traditional camp: the "cache", the men's camp, the cookhouse, stable, blacksmith shop, barn, office, the sharpening shed, home of the log driver, the meter, the sawmill, the shed to "voiturerie", tower fender... The museum also has a room of show and documentaries. Visitors find the harsh lifestyle of lumberjack (mostly men) and their tools. Schedule: June to October.
- The City Park with its panoramic view, with a dock and picnic tables near the creek Marcouiller on the edges of the route 155. This park offers a splendid view of the Saint-Maurice River and the "Pointe to the mine". This park is the gathering place for many events such as summer concerts, the national party, the Festi-Volant, various family parties, weddings, etc.
- Nature and its cliffs. Between the villages of Grandes-Piles and Saint-Roch-de-Mékinac, the coastal road (Route 155) on the east side of the Saint-Maurice River overlooks the cliffs of the "3rd East Row of the Saint-Maurice River". In addition, visitors can complete a road course using the Route 159 to see views from Saint-Roch-de-Mékinac and Saint-Tite.
- Aire Nature Grandes-Piles (Lac Clair) (Grandes-Piles Nature Area (Clear Lake)) is a protected area located in the 4th row and accessible through the Route 159; the intersection of "Lac Clair" (Clear Lake) road is located between the Lake Roberge (Grandes-Piles) and the "second lake Roberge". "Grandes-Piles Nature Area (Clear Lake)" offers primitive campsites, prospector tents and a cottage. Visitors can undertake outdoor activities: canoeing, kayaking, snorkeling, hiking, geocaching, fishing for trout and even join the National Trail.

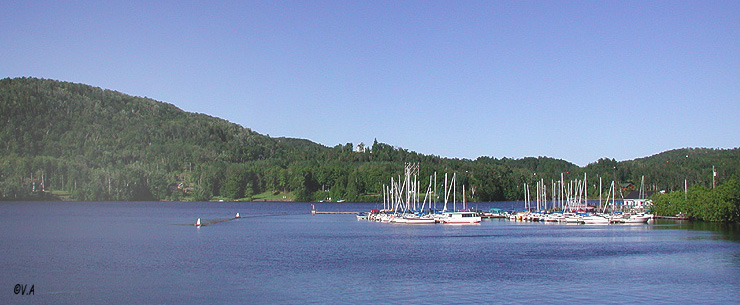
Marina

- The Marina Grandes-Piles has various services for boaters, including boat launch water, a terrace restaurant and quaies can accommodate more than 100 boats. Boaters enjoy the immense body of water generated by the hydroelectric dam Grand-Mère. The rising waters had flooded the old Falls on the Saint-Maurice River, near the village of Grandes-Piles.
- The Domaine Tavibois is located at the west end of Saint-Pierre North row on the boundary between Hérouxville and Grandes-Piles. Community ownership of the Daughters of Jesus, this area offers a variety of services all seasons to individuals, families and groups: accommodation, meals at the Manor, meeting rooms and outdoor activities. In the history of the Mauricie, the center was an important gathering place for events secular or religious.
- The Villa du Lac du Castor is a second home built by Pierre Thibault in 1998 and 2001 who received the 2000 Award of the Ordre des architectes du Québec.

== Notable people ==
- Philippe Lemay, born 1977, Canadian curler
