= North Mékinac River =

North Mekinac River
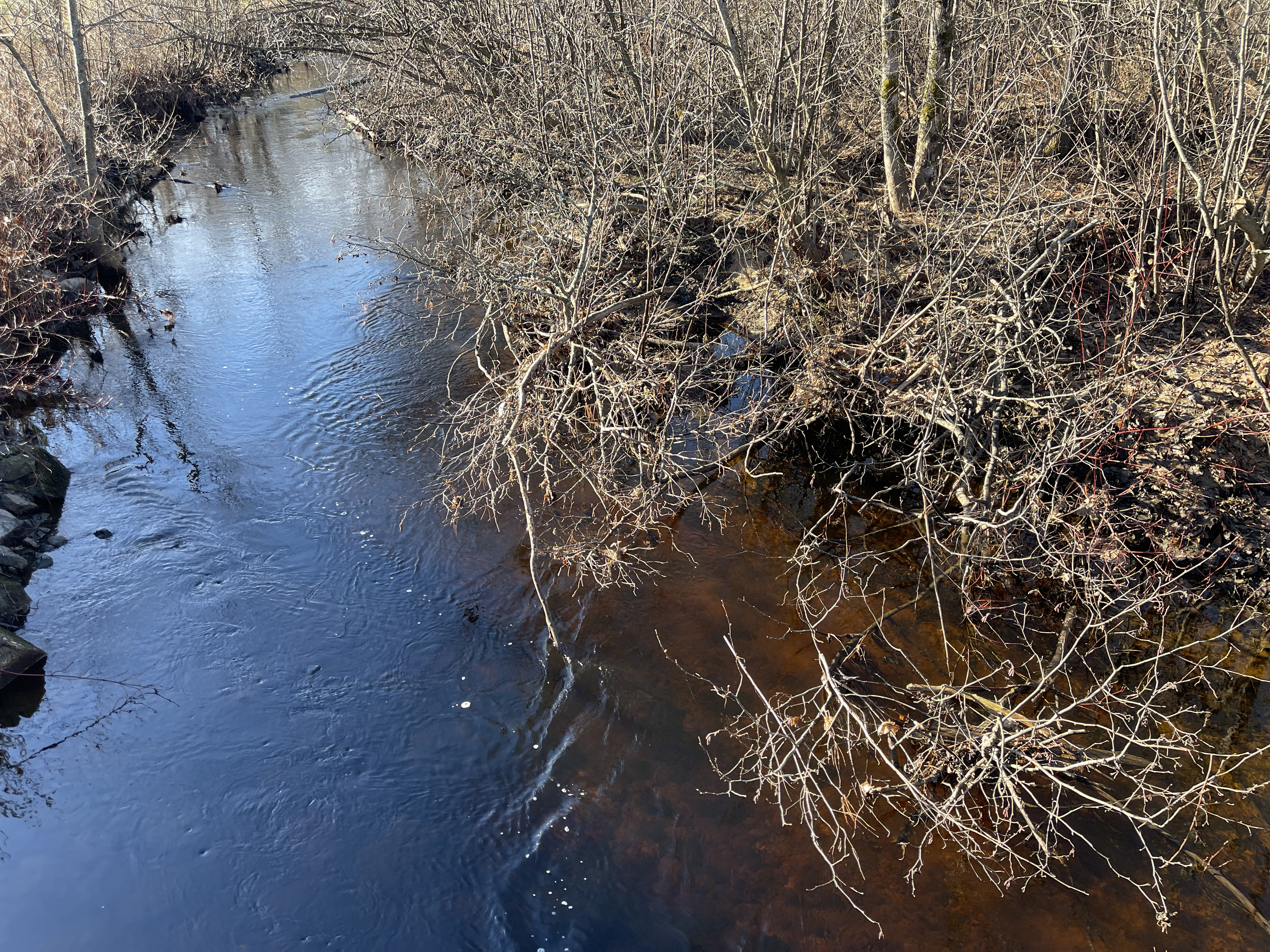
- From bridge P-03959, steel-wood, under embankment (1982), Rang du Haut-du-Lac Nord, Saint-Tite

Location
- Country: Canada

Physical characteristics
- Source
  - location: Grandes-Piles
  - coordinates: 46.73528°N 72.61056°W
  - elevation: 302 m (991 ft)
- Mouth
  - location: Rivière des Envies at Saint-Tite
  - elevation: 131 m (430 ft)
- Length: 28 km (17 mi)

The North Mekinac River flows from North to South, in three municipalities (Sainte-Thècle, Grandes-Piles and Saint-Tite), in Mauricie region, Mékinac Regional County Municipality, Quebec, Canada.

== Science ==
According to the research station set up by the Benthos Network (2008), the North Mékinac River is in good health. Note: Based on the composition of the benthic community collected on the natural substrate of streams and the condition of the habitat, the monitoring of the health of the benthos (natural substrate) allows the assessment of the health status of shallow streams with coarse and soft substrate.

== Toponymy ==
The toponym "Rivière Mékinac du Nord " was registered on December 5, 1968 in Commission de toponymie du Québec.

== Photos ==
Rivière Mékinac Nord

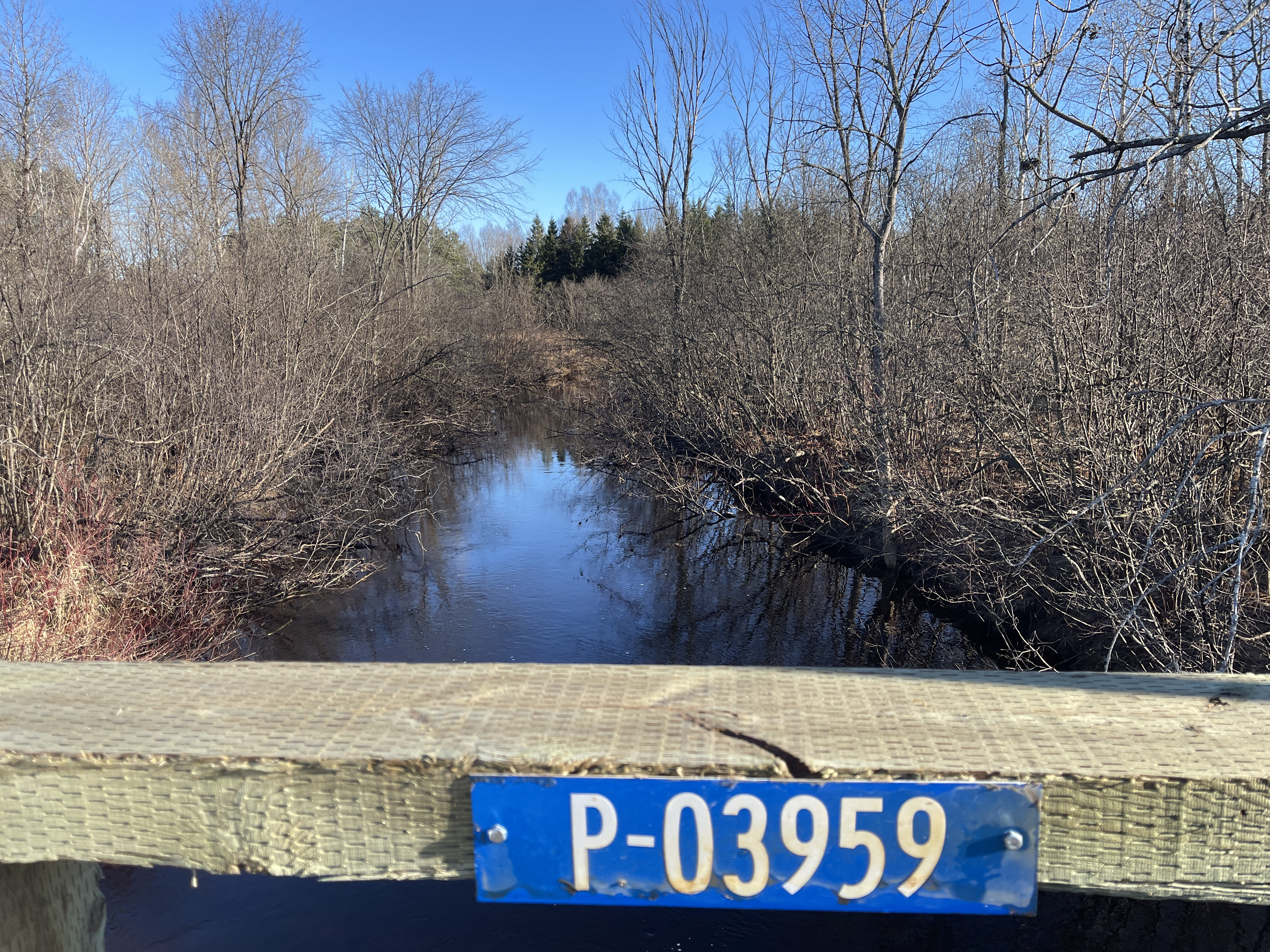
Panel on Bridge P-03959, steel-wood, under embankment (1982), rang du Haut-du-Lac Nord, Saint-Tite

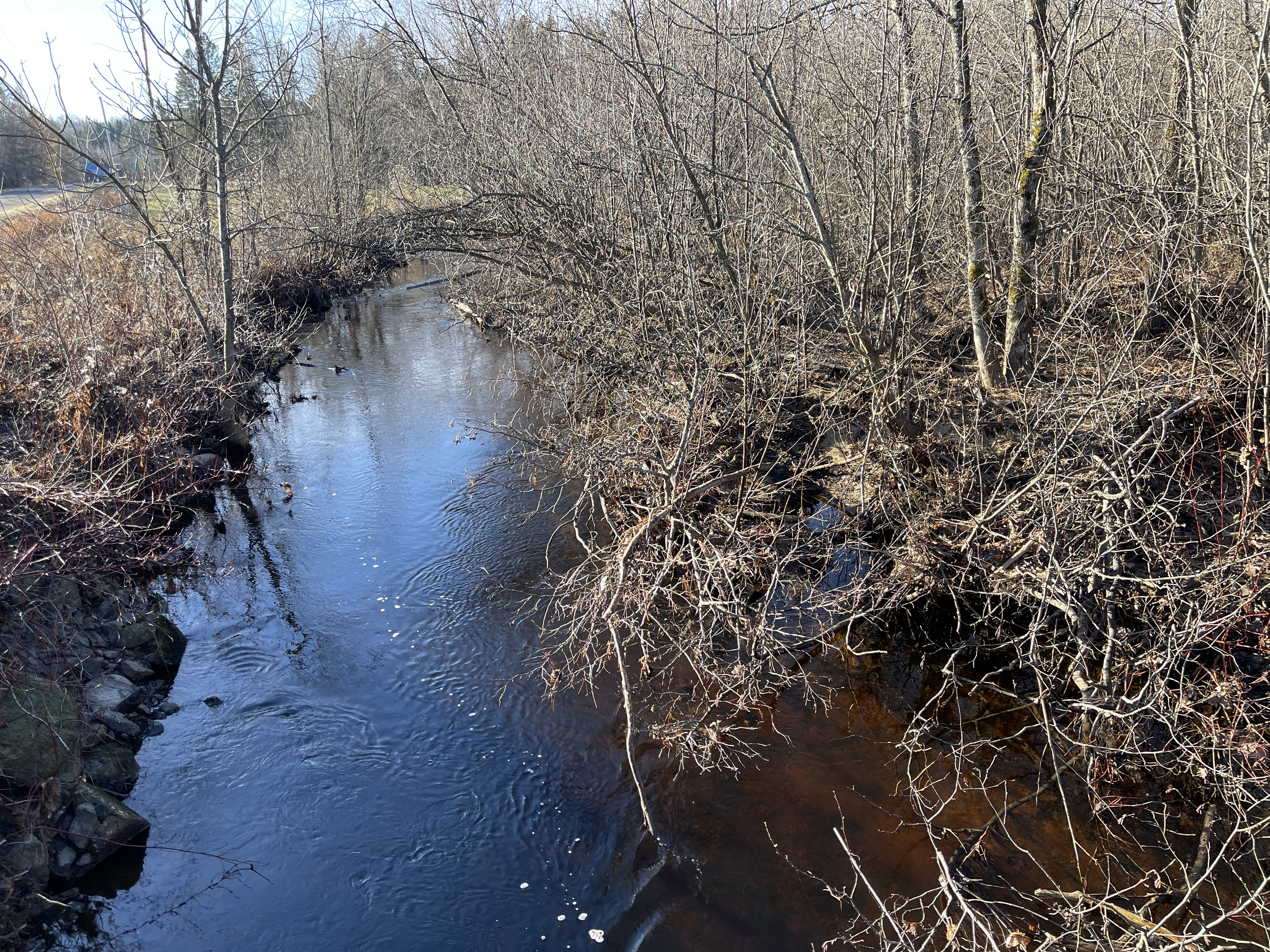
From bridge P-03959, steel-wood, under embankment (1982), rang Haut-du-Lac Nord, Saint-Tite

== See also ==
- Fishing regulations at Rivière Mékinac du Nord and fishing spot nearby
- Mékinac Regional County Municipality
- Grandes-Piles
- Saint-Tite
- Sainte-Thècle
- South Mékinac River
- Rivière des Envies
- Batiscanie, Quebec
- Batiscan River
- Lake Roberge (Grandes-Piles)
- Lake Fontaine (Mékinac)
- Lejeune Township
