= Saint-Tite station =

Railway station in Quebec, Canada

Saint-Tite Railway Station
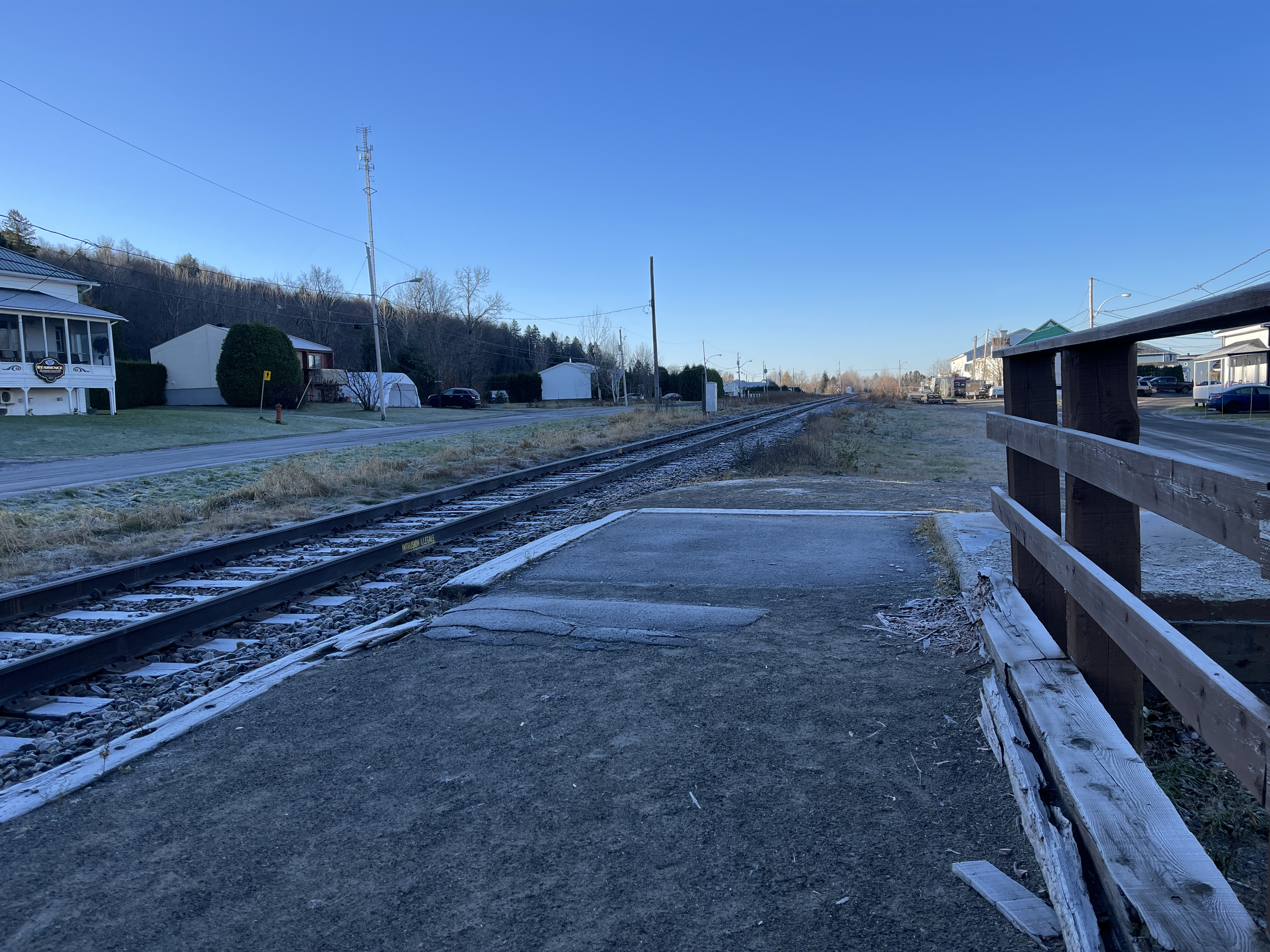
- Former Via Rail Canada Station Platform, Marchildon Street

General information
- Coordinates: 46.7231°N 72.5642°W

Other information
- Status: Sign post

Services
Preceding station	Via Rail	Following station
Hervey toward Jonquière	Montreal–Jonquière	Garneau toward Montreal
Hervey toward Senneterre	Montreal–Senneterre	Garneau toward Montreal
Former services
Preceding station	Canadian National Railway	Following station
Hérouxville toward Montreal	Montreal – Rivière-à-Pierre	Ste. Thècle toward Rivière-à-Pierre
Location

Saint-Tite station is a Via Rail Canada station in Saint-Tite, Quebec, Canada. It is located on Marchildon Street.

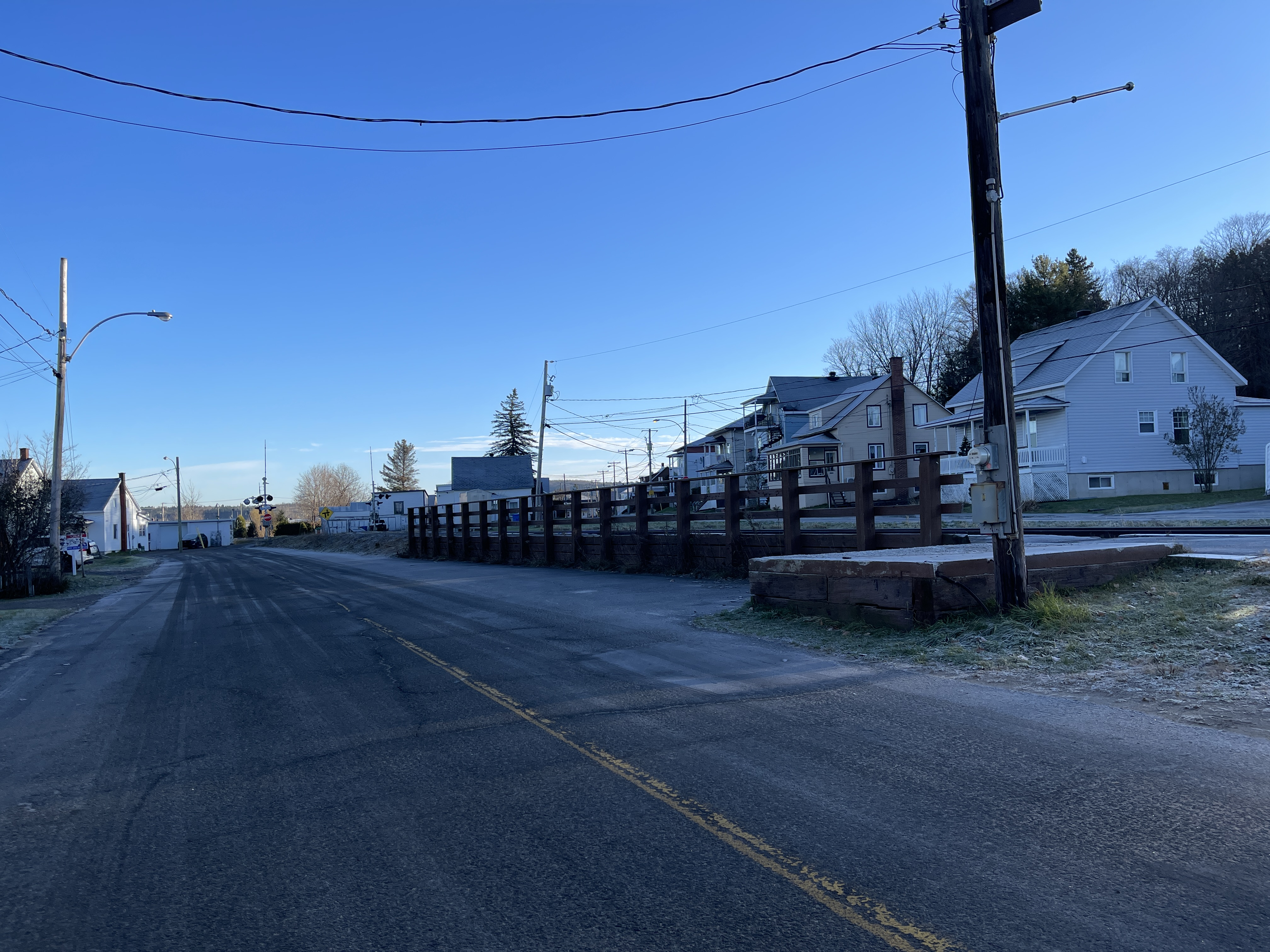
St. Tite, Marchildon Street, former Via Rail Canada Station Platform

Railway Fever 1878: The vast territory north of the St. Lawrence Plain, with its opening onto the immensity of the Canadian Shield, evokes grandiose dreams. In 1878, St. Laurence, Lower Laurentian & Saguenay obtained permission to build a track between Trois-Rivières and Saguenay-Lac-Saint-Jean via Saint-Tite.
