= Hervey station =

Railway station in Quebec, Canada

Hervey
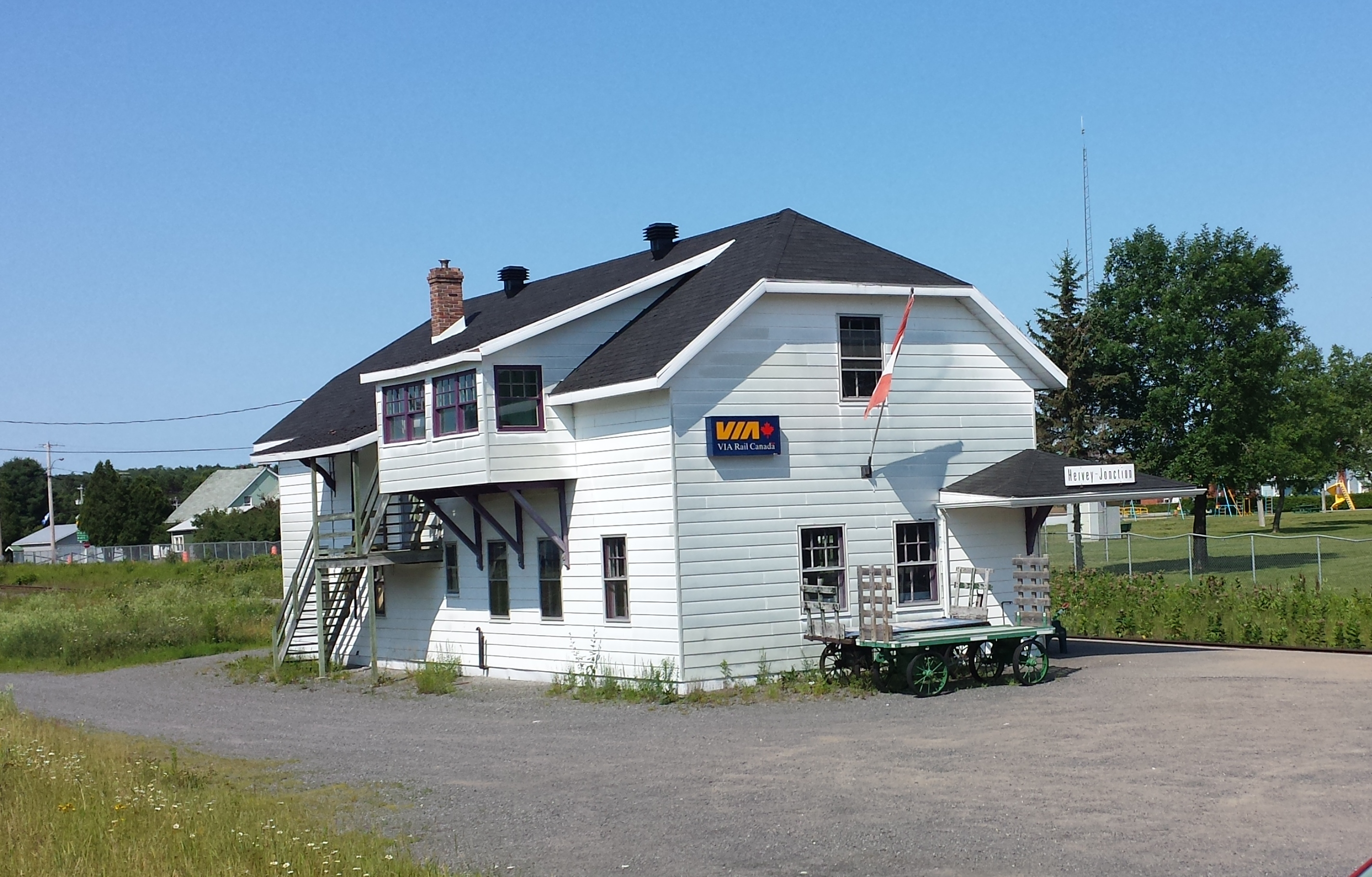
- The station, near the Catholic church

General information
- Coordinates: 46°51′11″N 72°28′09″W

Construction
- Structure type: Sign post

Services
Preceding station	Via Rail	Following station
Rousseau toward Jonquière	Montreal–Jonquière	Saint-Tite toward Montreal
La Tuque toward Senneterre	Montreal–Senneterre	Saint-Tite toward Montreal
Former services
Preceding station	Canadian National Railway	Following station
Audy toward Cochrane	Cochrane – Quebec	Thomas toward Quebec
Ste. Thècle toward Montreal	Montreal – Rivière-à-Pierre	Lac aux Sables toward Rivière-à-Pierre
Location

Hervey station or Hervey-Jonction station is a railway station in Hervey-Jonction, Quebec, Canada.

This station was built in 1905 when the National Transcontinental Railway (NTR) transcontinental railway main line was built between (Moncton–) Quebec City to the east and Western Canada to the west at a point where the line crossed the Canadian Northern Railway (CNoR) line from Montreal to the Lac Saint-Jean region. The lines eventually all came to be operated by the Canadian National Railway. Today, the station is where two Via Rail routes travelling together from Montreal (the Montreal–Jonquière train and the Montreal–Senneterre train) stop to perform a split and continue their journey in separate directions. The trains arrive from the south on the former CNoR tracks from Montreal; the train to Jonquière continues northeast along the former CNoR line; and the train to Senneterre heads northwest along the former NTR line. The trains combine here on the way back to Montreal.

The current site of the station is located just opposite the chapel Hervey-Jonction, in the heart of the village since 2007. The previous site of the station was located about 300 metres (980 ft) east along the former NTR line that connected Hervey-Junction to Quebec City. This section of railway ceased to be used in 2007 after 100 years of use.

The first station was located on the CNoR line at the south of the village of Hervey Junction, near the boundary with Sainte-Thècle.
