= Ahuntsic station (Via Rail) =

Railway station in Montreal, Quebec, Canada

Ahuntsic
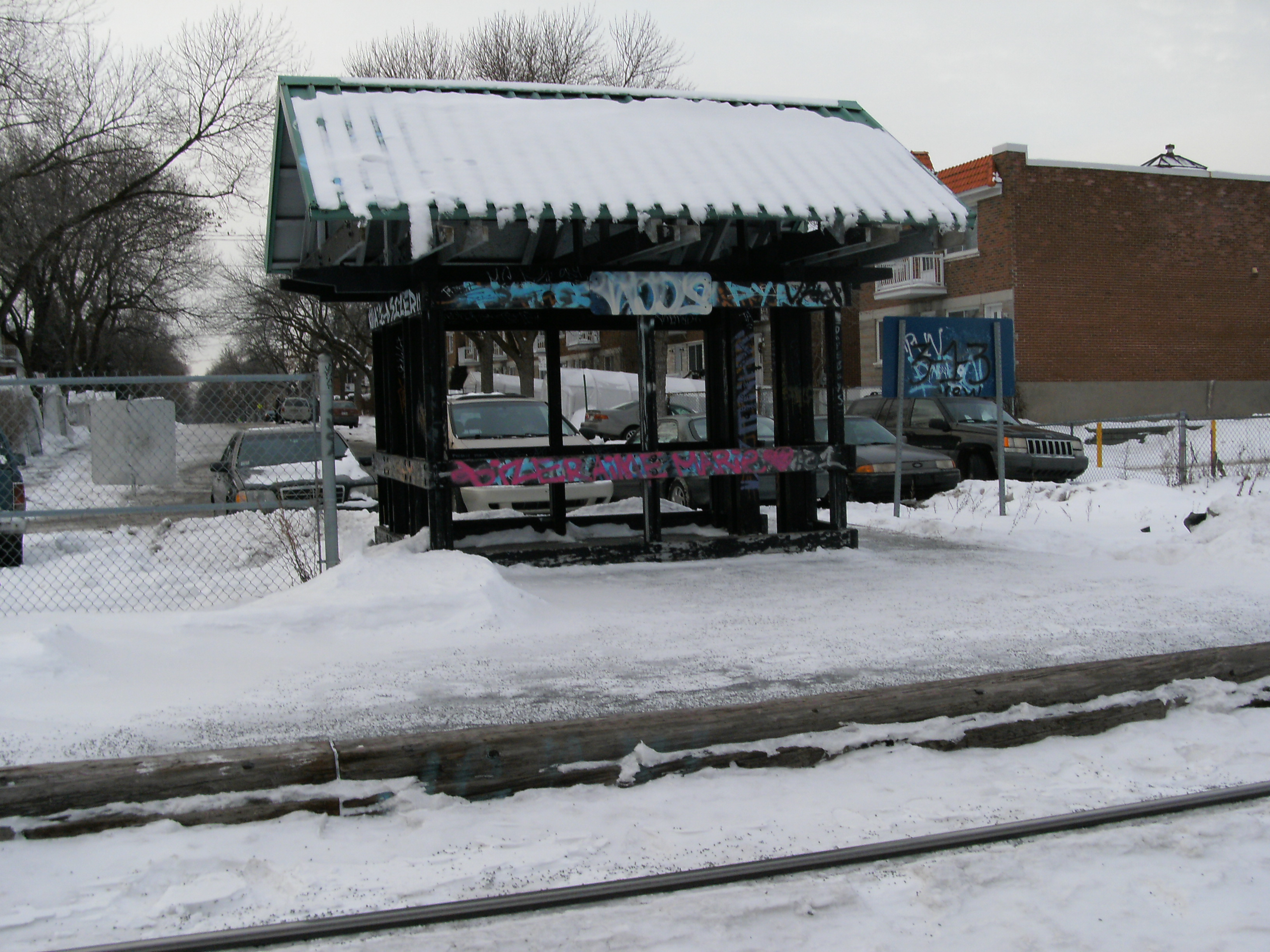

General information
- Location: Durham Avenue, Ahuntsic-Cartierville, Montreal, Quebec, Canada
- Coordinates: 45.5531°N 73.6522°W
- Platforms: 1 side platform
- Tracks: 1

History
- Closed: July 3, 2017

Former services
Preceding station	Via Rail	Following station
L'Assomption toward Jonquière	Montreal–Jonquière	Montreal Terminus
L'Assomption toward Senneterre	Montreal–Senneterre	Montreal Terminus
Preceding station	Canadian National Railway	Following station
Services in 1948
Mount Royal toward Montreal	Montreal – Rawdon; Local stops	Sault au Recollet toward Rawdon
Location

Ahuntsic station is a former intercity railway station in the Ahuntsic-Cartierville borough of Montreal, Quebec, Canada. It was an unstaffed shelter that served as an optional stop for two Via Rail routes running from Montreal. It was located on Durham Avenue, near the Sauvé metro station; the Exo Mascouche commuter rail line stops at the Sauvé station nearby.

On July 3, 2017, Via Rail ceased serving Ahuntsic and L'Assomption stations, and began serving Sauvé and Anjou stations instead. Both new stations are commuter rail stations operated by the Réseau de transport métropolitain (RTM).

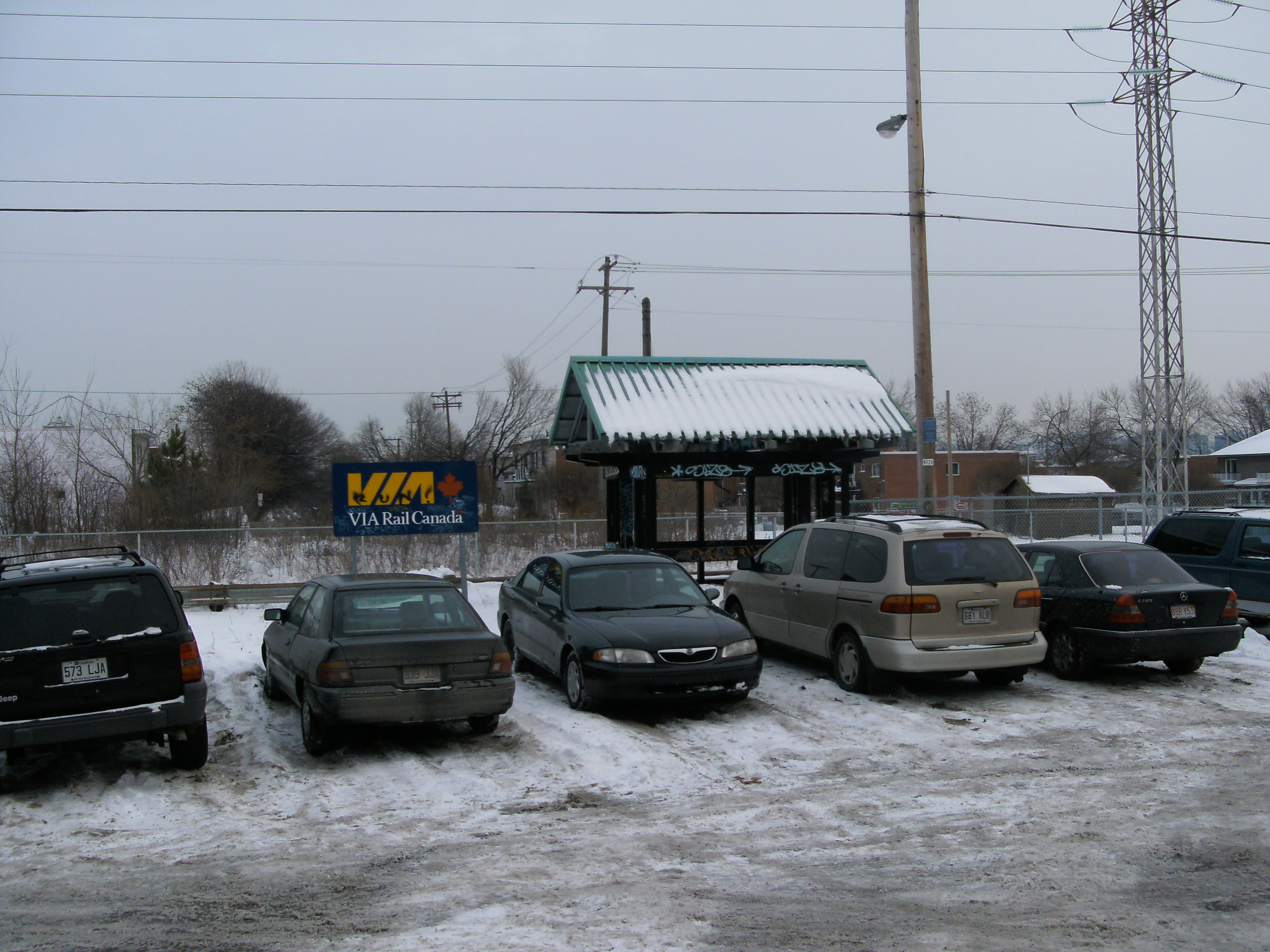
Via Rail's Ahuntsic station in Montreal, seen from Durham Avenue.
