= Dividing train =

Passenger train that separates into two along its route

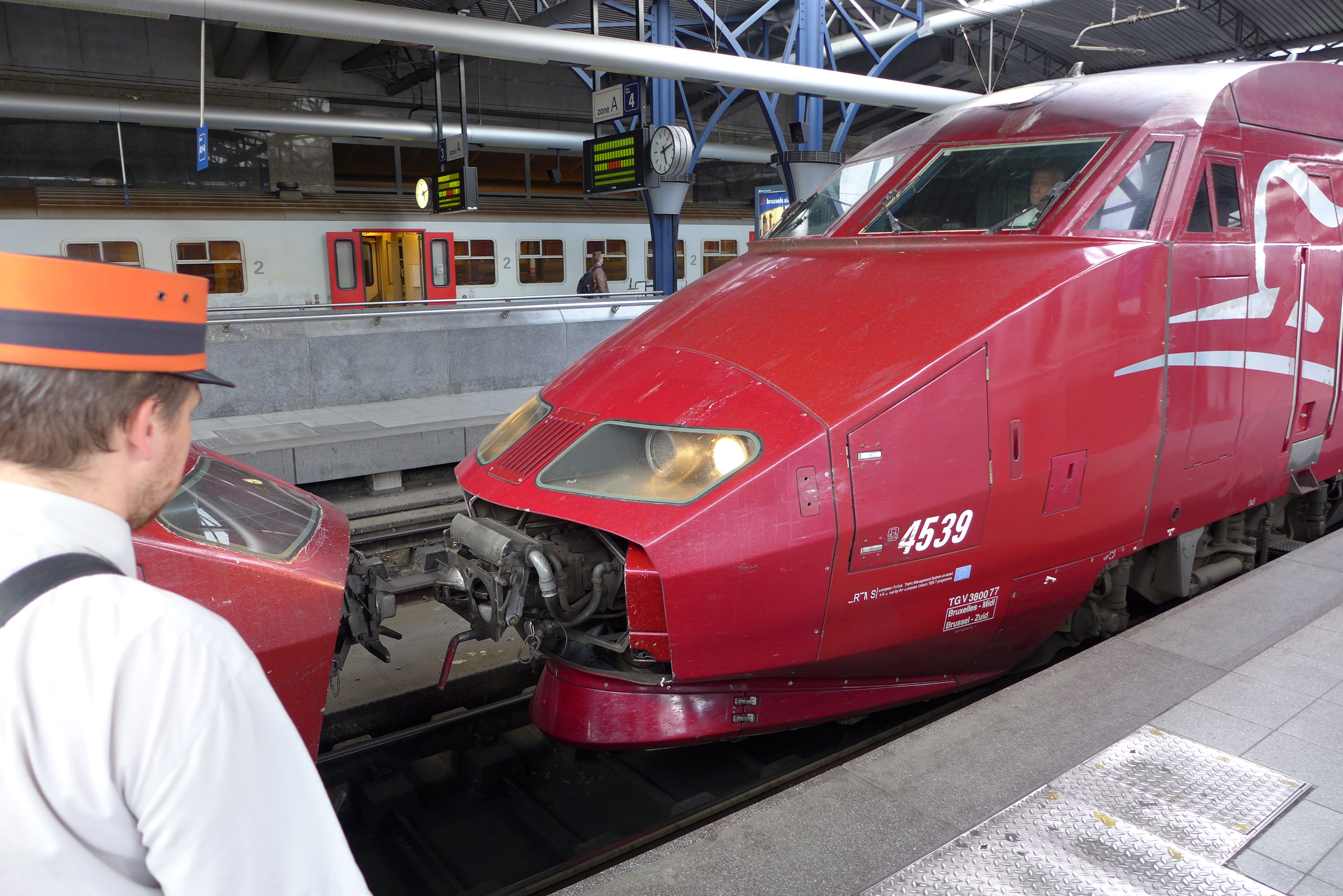
Thalys PBA train from Amsterdam Centraal couples with another unit at Brussels-South before continuing to Paris-Nord

A dividing train is a passenger train that separates into two trains partway along its route, so as to serve two destinations. Inversely, two trains from different origins may be coupled together mid-route to reach a common endpoint. Trains on complex routes may divide or couple multiple times. The general term for coupling two or more trains along their shared route sections is portion working.

For example, the westbound Empire Builder travels from Chicago Union Station to Spokane, Washington, where its cars are divided into two trains: one continues to Portland Union Station and one to King Street Station, Seattle. On the eastbound trip, trains from Portland and Seattle are coupled at Spokane before traveling as one train to Chicago.

Dividing trains are useful where line capacity is limited, allowing multiple trains to use the same path over a congested part of a network. The common sections will often be the busiest parts of the routes.

== Operation ==
Video: Coupling of two ICE T portions in Leipzig, 2017

On the initial leg of its journey, the train is driven as normal by a single crew. At a designated station before a junction, the train stops and some of the cars are detached, with passengers or goods still on board. The front part of the train then departs to run the remainder of its route. A second train is then formed from the detached cars, the points are changed at the junction, and a new crew drives the train on a different route to a second destination. Where the train is formed of multiple units – self-contained trainsets with their own propulsion and driving cabs – two or more units work in multiple on the first leg. After detachment, the second crew drives in the trailing unit's front cab.

On the return journey, the two trains may join at the same station where they divided. Special signalling is required at the station to allow a following train to enter the block currently occupied by the train in front in order for the two to couple. The British rail network uses a shunt signal to authorize this type of movement.

=== Possible combinations ===
A variety of portion working combinations is possible. For example:

- Two trains may each depart from separate termini, be coupled together en route, and arrive at their single destination together.
  - Vice versa, a pair of trains may depart together from the same terminus, be separated en route, and then continue to separate destinations.
- Two trains may each depart from separate termini, be coupled together, and later separated, en route, and then continue to separate destinations.
- A train may depart from a terminus, be coupled en route to another train departing from the point where the coupling occurs, and then the two trains will continue together to their single destination, thus providing a longer train for a busier portion of the route (or vice versa).
- A train may depart from a terminus, and divide at a station en route, with both portions then continuing to the same destination, but the first running an express stopping pattern, and the second part stopping more frequently. In the reverse of this, the second portion is the faster of the two, catching up the slow train at the point where they join.

=== Issues ===
For portion working to be successful, the operator may need to address many issues. For example:

- Locations for coupling and uncoupling must be designated.
- The best combinations of services must be carefully considered.
- Coupling and uncoupling takes time.
- Portion working can transfer disruption from one section to the wider network.

Dividing trains can sometimes cause issues for unwary travellers, who may board the wrong car and thus arrive at an unexpected destination.

== Examples ==
=== Australia ===
- Canberra Monaro Express – Sydney Central to Canberra and Cooma dividing at Queanbeyan (1955–73 and 1986–88)
- NSW TrainLink Northern Tablelands Xplorer – Sydney Central to Armidale and Moree dividing at Werris Creek (1941–84 and 1993–present)

=== Belgium ===
- IC trains between Genk and Knokke or Blankenberge (IC 1527–1542) used to be divided in Bruges, the front part went to Knokke (IC 1627–1642) while the rest continued to Blankenberge and the same occurred on the return leg (IC 1505–1520). The consists were either made up with AM96 EMU's (enable passage from set coach to another) or M6 coaches hauled by Class 19 locomotives. In the latter case, cab cars and engines are fitted with automatic couplers to allow quick separation. On periods with high affluence or when facing problems, these IC trains could run entirely to one destination (usually Blankenberghe) and another trainset was provided for the leg between Bruges and Knokke. This dual service ended with the new transport timetable introduced in December 2017. Now, separate trains are used for each destination.
- despite not being advertised as coupling trains, some IC trains between Lille Flandres and Tournai are then coupled with one or two AM96 trainsets going from Tournai or Kortrijk to Namur, therefore allowing to travel directly from Lille to Namur.
- The same happens with IC trains Between Lille Flandres and Mouscron. At Mouscron, they are coupled with AM96 multiple units which then run IC trains between Mouscron and Antwerp Centraal.

=== Canada ===
Route	From	Dividing at	Destination
Montreal–Senneterre train	Montreal Central Station	Hervey	Senneterre
Montreal–Jonquière train	Montreal Central Station	Hervey	Jonquière
Corridor trains 50 & 52	Toronto Union Station	Brockville	Ottawa
Corridor trains 60 & 62	Toronto Union Station	Brockville	Montreal Central Station

=== Germany ===
- There are several dividing regional and high-speed trains all over Germany. ICE trains from Munich often split at Hanover into sections for Bremen and for Hamburg. ICE from Berlin split at Hamm into sections for Cologne and for Düsseldorf.
- Munich S-Bahn: Line S1 serves both Freising and Munich Airport by splitting at Neufahrn bei Freising station
- Hanover Stadtbahn: In the evenings and on Sundays the lines 2 and 8 of Hanover's light rail system work with dividing trains. Trains start in Alte Heide as line 2 and divide at Peiner Straße stop. One part continues as line 8 to Messe Nord, the other as line 2 to Rethen. In the other direction, trains reconnect at Bothmerstraße station and run as line 2 to Alte Heide.
- Hamburg S-Bahn: The trains on the line S1 of Hamburg's S-Bahn system usually split at Ohlsdorf into sections for Hamburg Airport and for Poppenbüttel.
- Since 2014, the Regional-Express services RE 1 Mannheim–Saarbrücken–Trier–Koblenz and RE 11 Luxembourg City–Trier–Koblenz operate jointly with trains dividing in Trier main station. The RE 1 part is operated by the German DB Regio South-West with a Stadler FLIRT single-deck EMU as part of the Süwex network, while the RE 11 part is operated by the Luxembourgish Société Nationale des Chemins de Fer Luxembourgeois with a double-deck Stadler KISS EMU. This is probably the only situation where a single-deck and a double-deck train of two countries' national railways divide
- Since 2018, the Regional-Express service RE 7 Hamburg–Elmshorn–Neumünster–Kiel/Flensburg is split at Neumünster with the front train continuing to Kiel, the rear to Flensburg.

=== Japan ===
There are several dividing train services in Japan, and each route has its own name.

Route	From	Dividing at	Destination	Remarks
Komachi	Tokyo Station	Morioka Station	Akita Station	Shinkansen high-speed train services
Hayabusa	Tokyo Station	Morioka Station	Shin-Hakodate-Hokuto Station	Shinkansen high-speed train services
Sunrise Izumo	Tokyo Station	Okayama Station	Izumoshi Station	Overnight sleeper services
Sunrise Seto	Tokyo Station	Okayama Station	Takamatsu Station	Overnight sleeper services
Narita Express	Narita Airport	Tokyo Station	Yokohama, Ōfuna	Airport rail link
Narita Express	Narita Airport	Tokyo Station	Shinjuku, Ōmiya, Takao	Airport rail link

=== United Kingdom ===
The practice of portion working has been followed for a long time on the third rail network of lines in the South East of England, and has been more widely practised in continental Europe. Elsewhere in the United Kingdom, the practice has been less common, because of a general reluctance to design the necessary modern signalling systems, and because of legal constraints on competition between operators.

Dividing trains operate on several lines on the British railway network, mainly (although not exclusively) in the south of the country. To ensure consistent journey times, the front part of a dividing train usually becomes the rear of the returning service when it reunites.

In addition, some services detach carriages part-way along the route, and pick them back up on the return journey. This may be because a portion of the line has short platforms at a number of its stations, or because demand is much higher on one section than another.

Route	From	Dividing at	Destination	Remarks
Arun Valley line	London Victoria	Horsham	Front part non-stop to Barnham, then semi-fast or all-stations to Portsmouth Harbour	On Sundays calls at all stations to Barnham and divides there.
Arun Valley line	London Victoria	Horsham	Rear all stations to Bognor Regis	On Sundays calls at all stations to Barnham and divides there.
Caledonian Sleeper (Lowland)	London Euston	Carstairs	Front part to Edinburgh Waverley	
Caledonian Sleeper (Lowland)	London Euston	Carstairs	Rear part to Glasgow Central	
Caledonian Sleeper (Highland)	London Euston	Edinburgh Waverley	Front part to Inverness	
Caledonian Sleeper (Highland)	London Euston	Edinburgh Waverley	Middle part to Aberdeen	
Caledonian Sleeper (Highland)	London Euston	Edinburgh Waverley	Rear part to Fort William	
Cambrian Coast Line	Birmingham New Street	Machynlleth	Front part to Aberystwyth	Both parts call at Dovey Junction, but use separate platforms there, and therefore must divide one stop earlier.
Cambrian Coast Line	Birmingham New Street	Machynlleth	Rear part to Pwllheli	Both parts call at Dovey Junction, but use separate platforms there, and therefore must divide one stop earlier.
Caterham line Tattenham Corner line	London Bridge	Purley	Front part to Caterham	Colloquially known as the "Cat & Tat". Was the most common service pattern on the branches from Purley before resignalling work made them an extension of the Brighton Main Line local tracks.
Caterham line Tattenham Corner line	London Bridge	Purley	Rear part to Tattenham Corner	Colloquially known as the "Cat & Tat". Was the most common service pattern on the branches from Purley before resignalling work made them an extension of the Brighton Main Line local tracks.
Chatham Main Line	London Victoria	Faversham	Front part to Ramsgate	
Chatham Main Line	London Victoria	Faversham	Rear part to Dover Priory	
East Coastway Line	London Victoria	Eastbourne	Front terminates at Eastbourne	
East Coastway Line	London Victoria	Eastbourne	Rear part to Ore	
South West Main Line	London Waterloo	Bournemouth	Front part to Weymouth	Most Dorset stations beyond Bournemouth have short platforms. During peak hours, trains divide at Southampton Central, with the front portion running fast to Bournemouth, then most or all stations to Weymouth. The rear part calls at most or all stations to Bournemouth or Poole.
South West Main Line	London Waterloo	Bournemouth	Rear part terminates at Bournemouth, or runs separately to Poole	Most Dorset stations beyond Bournemouth have short platforms. During peak hours, trains divide at Southampton Central, with the front portion running fast to Bournemouth, then most or all stations to Weymouth. The rear part calls at most or all stations to Bournemouth or Poole.
South West Main Line	London Waterloo	Eastleigh	Front 5 carriages to Poole	Sunday service
South West Main Line	London Waterloo	Eastleigh	Rear 5 carriages to Portsmouth Harbour	Sunday service
West of England Main Line	London Waterloo	Salisbury	Front part to Exeter St Davids	
West of England Main Line	London Waterloo	Salisbury	Rear part terminates at Salisbury	

=== United States ===
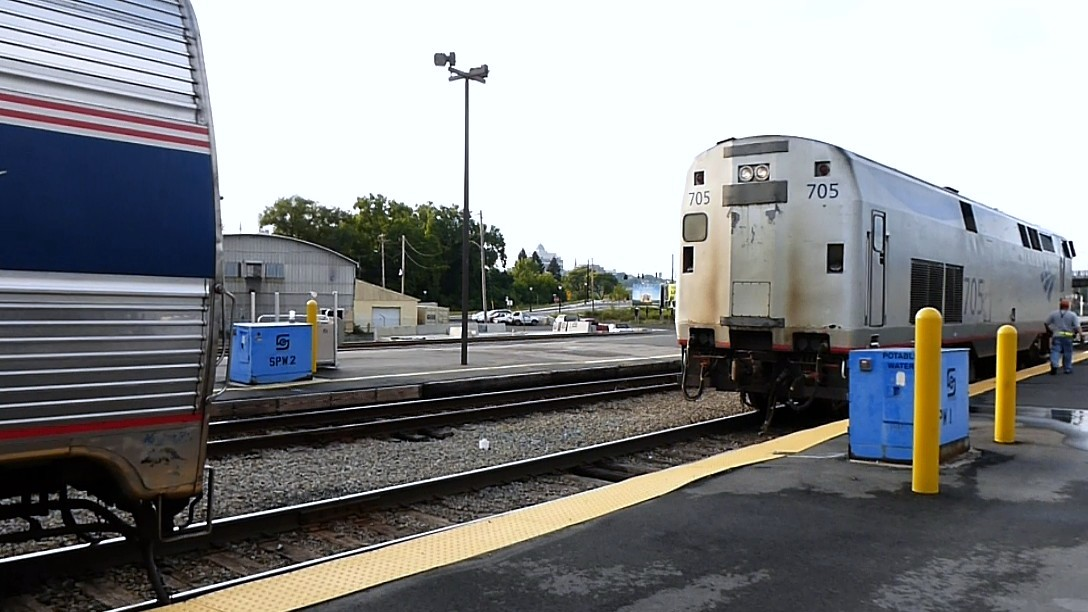
The westbound Lake Shore Limited coupling process at Albany–Rensselaer.

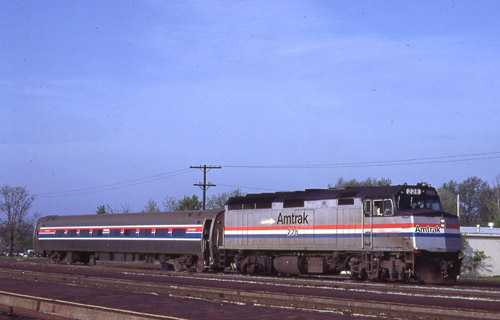
The River Cities consisted of a single coach conveyed between the Mules at St. Louis and the City of New Orleans at Carbondale.

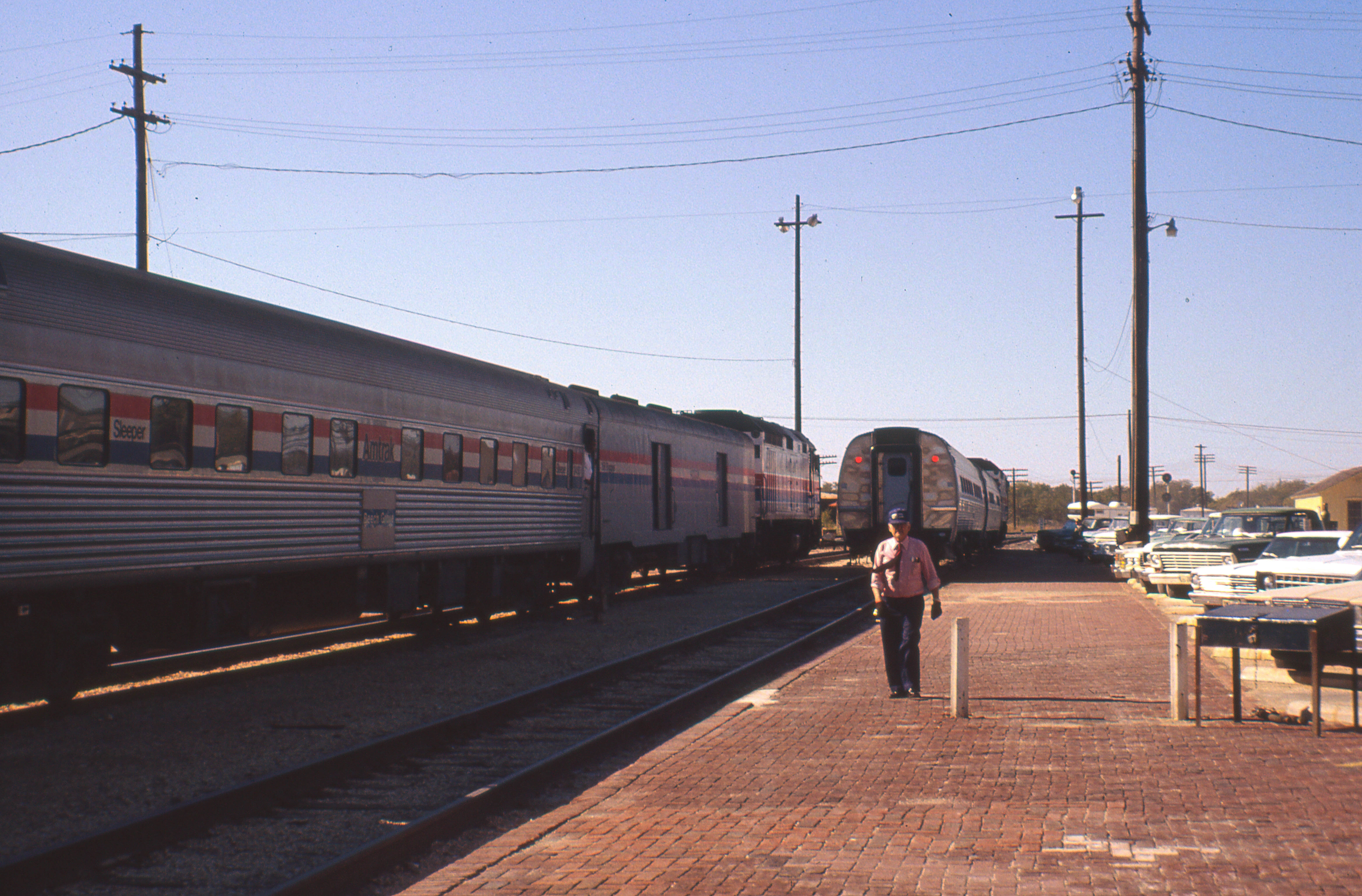
The Houston and Laredo sections of the Inter-American assembling at Temple.

Route	From	Dividing at	Destination	Remarks
Amtrak routes
Empire Builder	Chicago	Spokane	Seattle	
Empire Builder	Chicago	Spokane	Portland	
Lake Shore Limited	Chicago	Albany–Rensselaer	Boston South Station	
Lake Shore Limited	Chicago	Albany–Rensselaer	New York	
Texas Eagle	Los Angeles	San Antonio	Chicago	The division occurs only for the Sunset Limited's three weekly round trips. The Texas Eagle runs an additional four round trips per week between San Antonio and Chicago alone.
Sunset Limited	Los Angeles	San Antonio	New Orleans	The division occurs only for the Sunset Limited's three weekly round trips. The Texas Eagle runs an additional four round trips per week between San Antonio and Chicago alone.
Former Amtrak routes
James Whitcomb Riley	Chicago	Charlottesville	Washington, D.C.	1971–1976
James Whitcomb Riley	Chicago	Charlottesville	Newport News	1971–1976
Floridian	Chicago	Jacksonville	St. Petersburg	1971–1979
Floridian	Chicago	Jacksonville	Miami	1971–1979
National Limited	Kansas City	Harrisburg (pre-1978); Philadelphia (post-1978)	New York	1971–1979
National Limited	Kansas City	Harrisburg (pre-1978); Philadelphia (post-1978)	Washington, D.C.	1971–1979
Lone Star	Chicago	Fort Worth	Dallas	1975–1976, 1977–1979
Lone Star	Chicago	Fort Worth	Houston	1975–1976, 1977–1979
Inter-American	Chicago	Temple	Houston	1979–1981
Inter-American	Chicago	Temple	Laredo	1979–1981
Pioneer	Chicago	Ogden; Denver (post-1991)	Seattle	1980–1997
San Francisco Zephyr and California Zephyr	Chicago	Ogden; Denver (post-1991)	Oakland	1980–1997
Desert Wind	Chicago	Ogden; Denver (post-1991)	Los Angeles	1980–1997
River Cities	New Orleans	Carbondale	Kansas City	1984–1993
City of New Orleans	New Orleans	Carbondale	Chicago	1984–1993
Gulf Breeze	New York	Birmingham	Mobile	1989–1995
Crescent	New York	Birmingham	New Orleans	1989–1995

== See also ==
- Interchange
- Slip coach
- Through coach
- Sections in North America
- Express train
