= Joliette station (Via Rail) =

Railway station in Quebec, Canada

Joliette
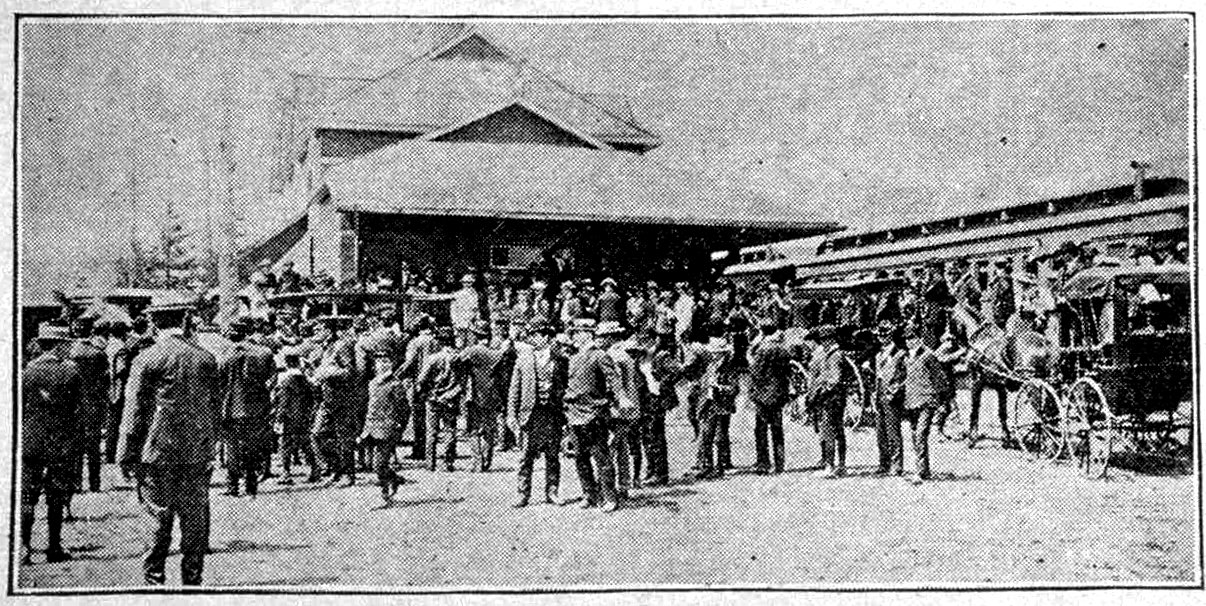
- Vacationers at the station, circa 1905

General information
- Location: 380 Champlain Street; Joliette, Quebec; Canada
- Coordinates: 46.0293°N 73.4440°W
- Operator: Via Rail
- Line: Montreal-Hervey Junction trunk

Other information
- Status: Staffed station

Services
| Preceding station | Via Rail | Following station |
|---|---|---|
| Saint-Justin toward Jonquière | Montreal–Jonquière | Anjou toward Montreal |
| Saint-Justin toward Senneterre | Montreal–Senneterre | Anjou toward Montreal |
Former services
| Preceding station | Via Rail | Following station |
|---|---|---|
| Saint-Justin toward Jonquière | Montreal–Jonquière | L'Assomption toward Montreal |
| Saint-Justin toward Senneterre | Montreal–Senneterre | L'Assomption toward Montreal |
| Preceding station | Canadian National Railway | Following station |
| Crabtree toward Montreal | Montreal – Rivière-à-Pierre | Ste. Elizabeth toward Rivière-à-Pierre |
Location

Joliette railway station is a Heritage Railway Station located at 380 Champlain Street in Joliette, Quebec, Canada. It is operated by Via Rail on two routes running from Montreal, Quebec.

== See also ==
- List of designated heritage railway stations of Canada
