= Shawinigan station =

Railway station in Quebec, Canada

Shawinigan
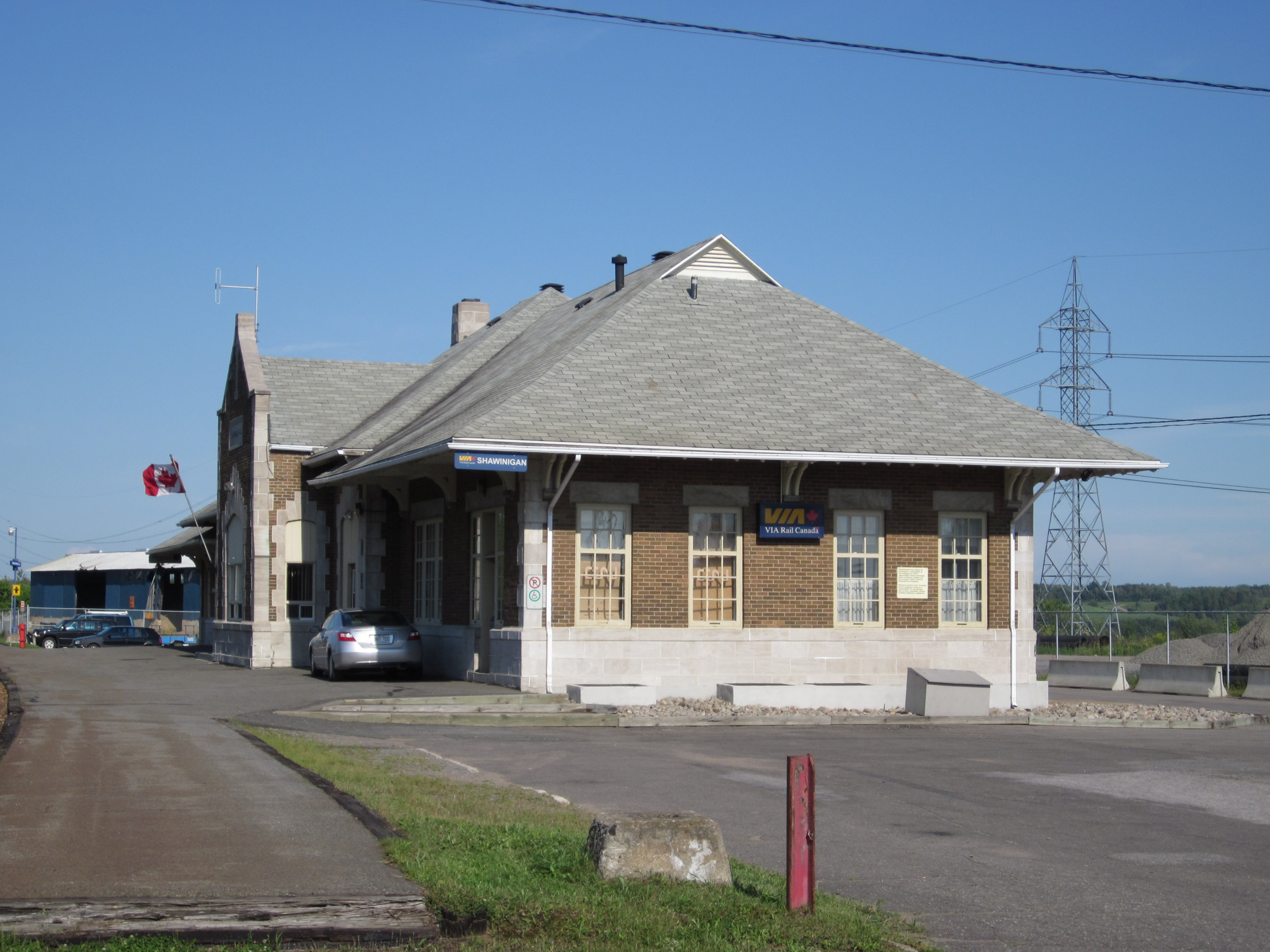

General information
- Location: 1560 Chemin du CN, Shawinigan, Quebec, Canada
- Coordinates: 46°32′59″N 72°44′43″W
- Owner: Via Rail
- Platforms: 1 side platform
- Tracks: 1

Construction
- Structure type: Shelter; Heritage building

History
- Opened: 1929
- Former names: Shawinigan Falls

Services
Preceding station	Via Rail	Following station
Grand-Mère toward Jonquière	Montreal–Jonquière	Charette toward Montreal
Grand-Mère toward Senneterre	Montreal–Senneterre	Charette toward Montreal
Former services
Preceding station	Canadian National Railway	Following station
Val Pichette toward Montreal	Montreal – Rivière-à-Pierre	Grand-Mère toward Rivière-à-Pierre
Location

Shawinigan station is located on Chemin du CN in Shawinigan, Quebec, Canada. It is a former CN Rail station and is currently used by Via Rail for two routes running from Montreal. The station is staffed and is wheelchair-accessible. It is a designated Heritage Railway Station.
