= L'Assomption station =

Railway station in Quebec, Canada

L'Assomption
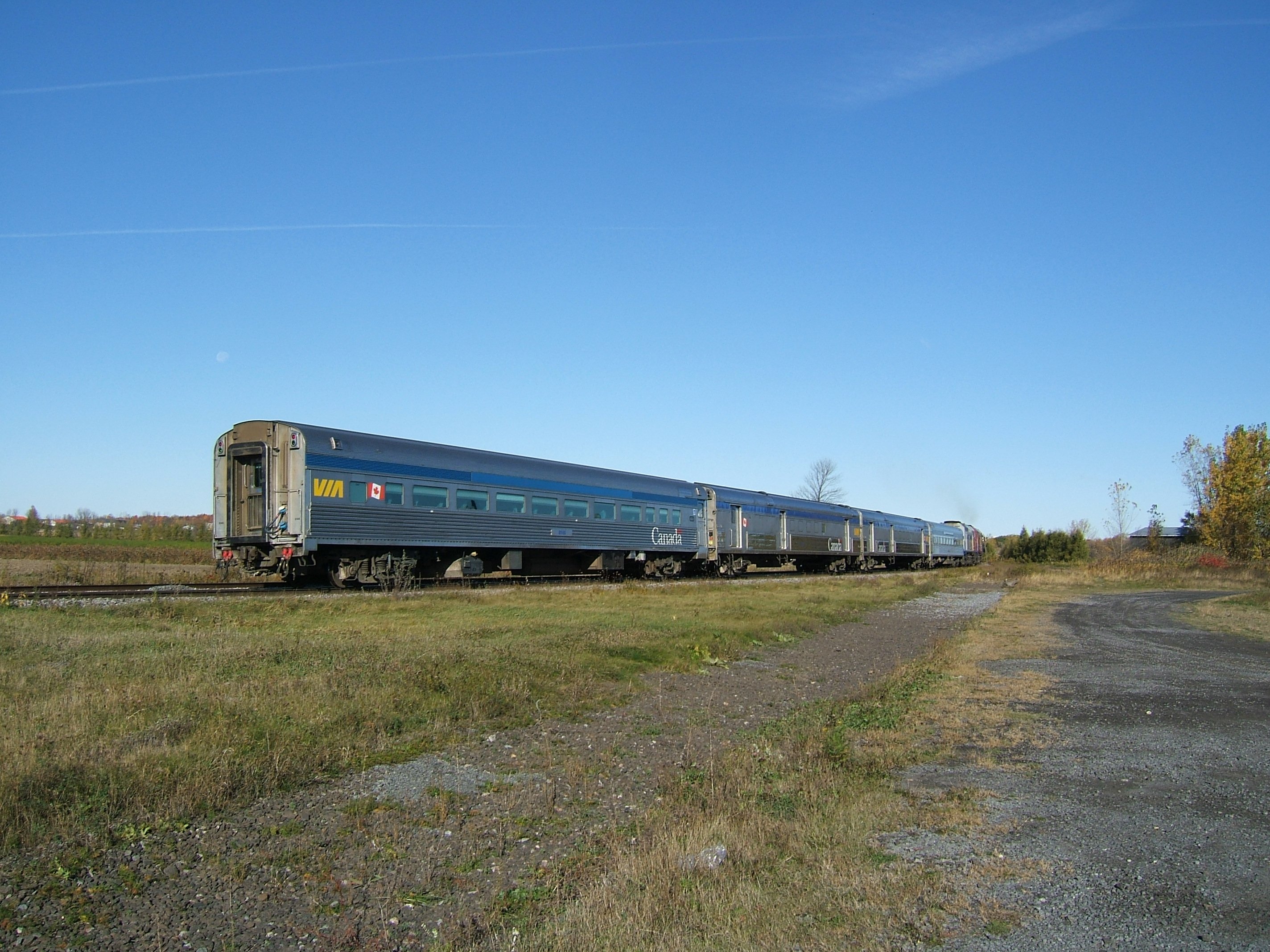
- L'Assomption station with the Senneterre/Saguenay train departing

General information
- Location: L'Assomption, QC, Canada
- Coordinates: 45.8192°N 73.4365°W
- Platforms: 1 side platform
- Tracks: 1

History
- Closed: July 3, 2017

Former services
Preceding station	Via Rail	Following station
Joliette toward Jonquière	Montreal–Jonquière	Ahuntsic toward Montreal
Joliette toward Senneterre	Montreal–Senneterre	Ahuntsic toward Montreal
Preceding station	Canadian National Railway	Following station
Services in 1948
St. Paul I'Ermite toward Montreal	Montreal – Rawdon; Local stops	L'Epiphanie toward Rawdon
Location

L'Assomption station is a former Via Rail station in L'Assomption, Quebec, Canada. It is marked only by a signpost and served as an optional stop for two Via Rail routes running from Montreal, Quebec.

On July 3, 2017, Via Rail ceased serving Ahuntsic and L'Assomption stations, and began serving Sauvé and Anjou stations instead. Both new stations are commuter rail stations operated by the Réseau de transport métropolitain (RTM).
