= Jonquière (disambiguation) =

Jonquière could refer to the following:

== Places ==
- Jonquière, city in Canada
- Fort La Jonquière - former French fort
- Jonquières, Vaucluse - Commune in France
- Montreal–Jonquière train - passenger train
- Jonquière Marquis - ice hockey Team

== Politics ==
- Jonquière-Kénogami - former electoral district
- Jonquière (federal electoral district)
- Jonquière (provincial electoral district)
- Jonquière—Alma - former federal electoral district

== Other ==
- Cégep de Jonquière - university
- Jacques-Pierre de Taffanel de la Jonquière, Marquis de la Jonquière - politician
- Jonquière station - train station
- Jonquière Condors - former minor league hockey team
- HMCS Jonquiere - WW2 ship
- Ernest de Jonquières - French mathematician
