= Chambord station =

Railway station in Quebec, Canada

Chambord
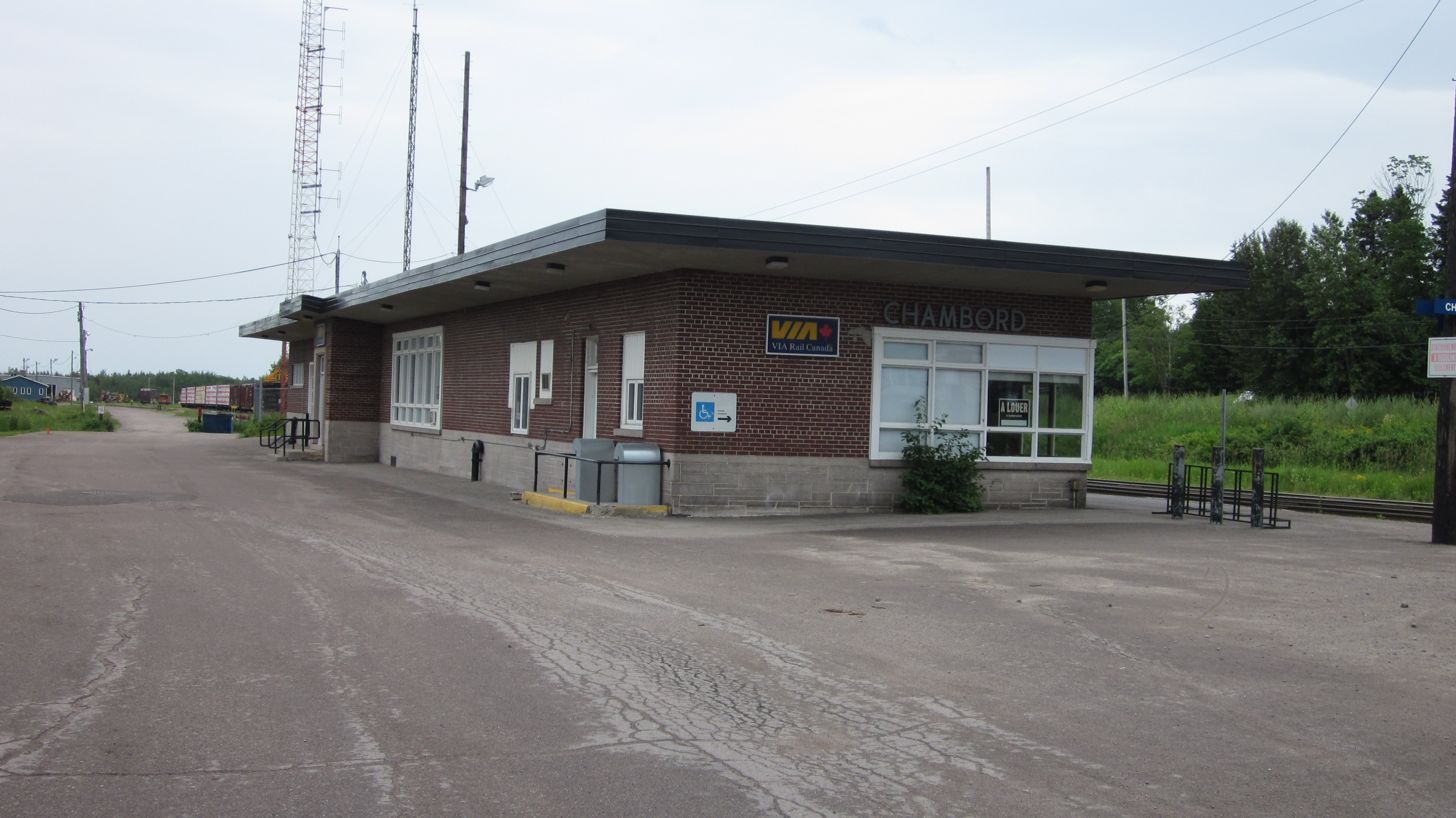

General information
- Location: 169 rue de la Gare, Chambord, Quebec; Canada
- Coordinates: 48.4214°N 72.0589°W
- Platforms: 1 side platform
- Tracks: 1

Construction
- Structure type: Shelter

Services
Preceding station	Via Rail	Following station
Hébertville toward Jonquière	Montreal–Jonquière	Lac-Bouchette toward Montreal
Former services
Preceding station	Canadian National Railway	Following station
Lac à Belley toward Quebec	Quebec – Chicoutimi	Desbiens toward Chicoutimi
Val Jalbert toward Dolbeau	Dolbeau – Chambord	Terminus
Location

Chambord station is a Via Rail station in Chambord, Quebec, Canada, a municipality on the southern edge of Lac Saint-Jean. It has limited opening hours, but the station and platform are accessible by wheelchair.

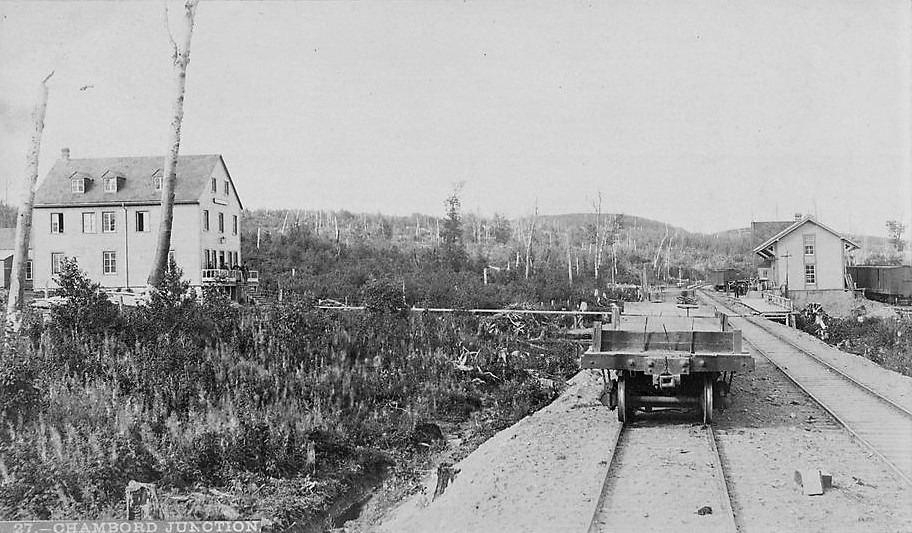
Quebec and Lake Saint-John Railway: Chambord Junction, between 1887 and 1890

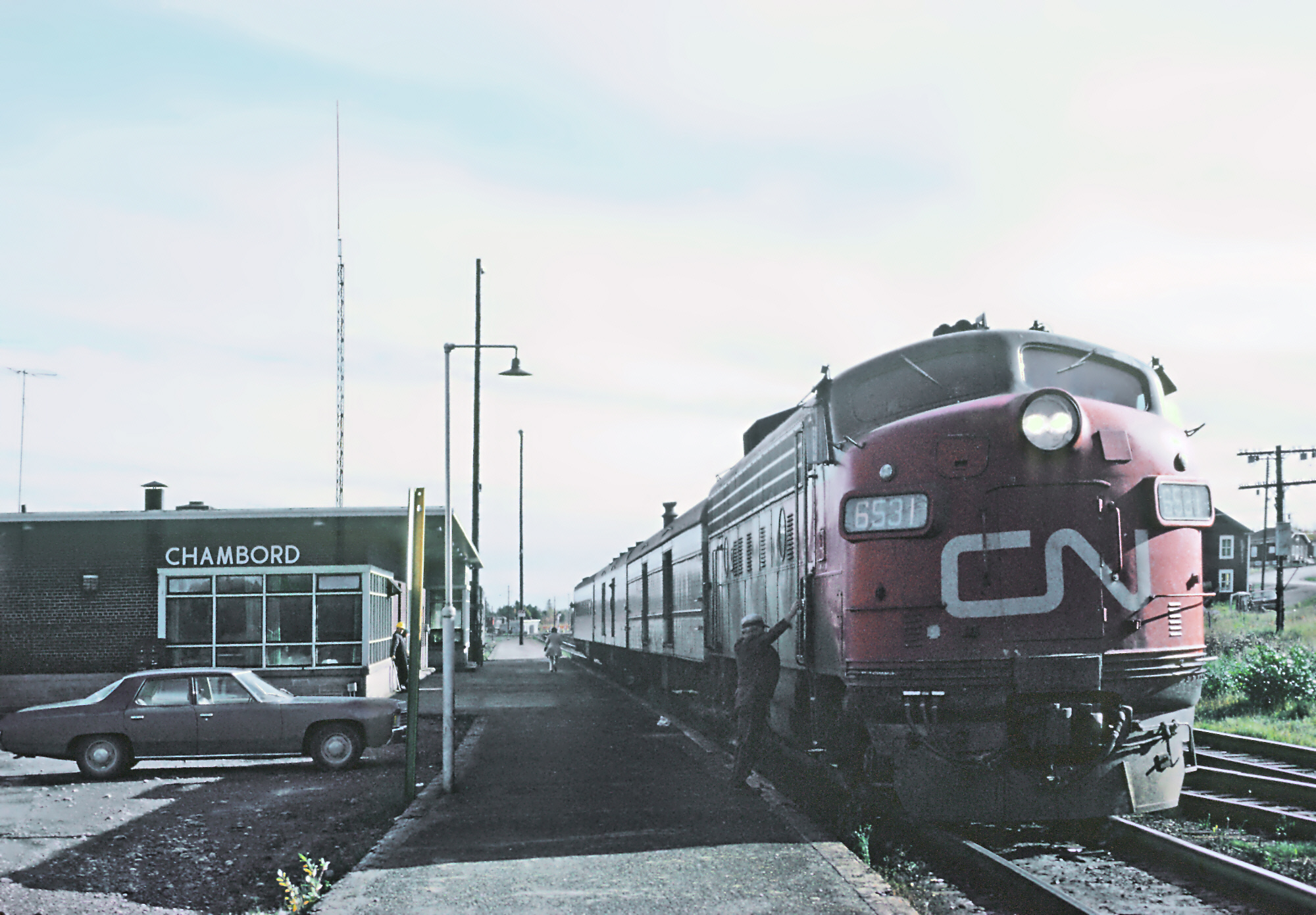
CN FP9 6531 at Chambord in October 1971
