= Hébertville (disambiguation) =

Hébertville is a municipality in Quebec.

Hébertville may also refer to:

- Hébertville-Station, Quebec, Canada
- Hébertville station, a railway station in Hébertville-Station, Quebec, Canada

== See also ==
- Herbertville
