= Cross of Gaspé =

Coordinates: 48.8276°N 64.4842°W

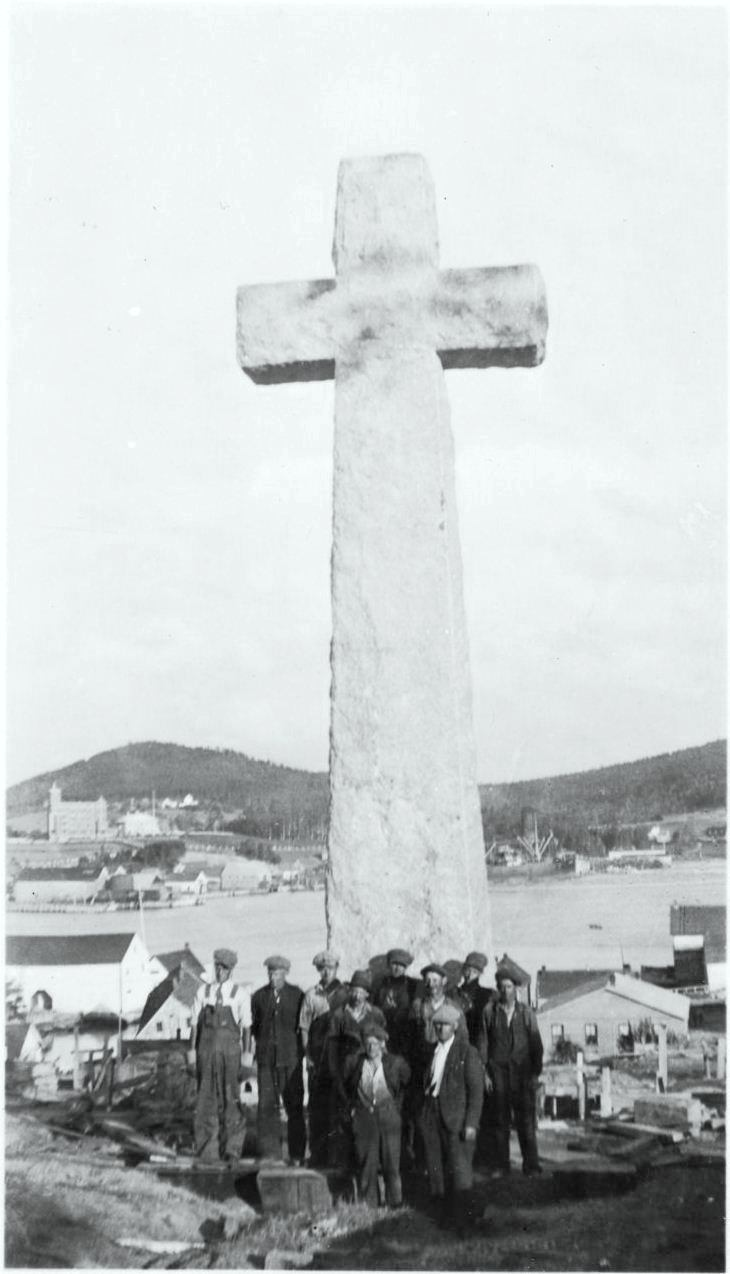
Cross of Gaspé at the time of its erection in 1934

The Cross of Gaspé is a monolithic granite cross installed in 1934 in the town of Gaspé, Quebec, commissioned by the Government of Canada to commemorate the 400th anniversary of the arrival of French explorers in Canada. The original Cross of Gaspé was erected on July 24, 1534 overlooking the bay of Gaspé, by the team of Jacques Cartier on his first trip exploration in the Gulf of St. Lawrence. Planting the cross symbolized the ownership of the territory on behalf of the King of France, Francis I. The original 30 feet (9.1 m) wooden cross was probably planted on the edge of the basin north of the York River.

== Granite Cross at Gaspé ==
This cross of Gaspé was commissioned by the federal government at a cost of $7,000 to commemorate the 400th anniversary of the arrival of French explorer Jacques Cartier in the Bay of Gaspé on July 24, 1534. It was unveiled on August 25, 1934.

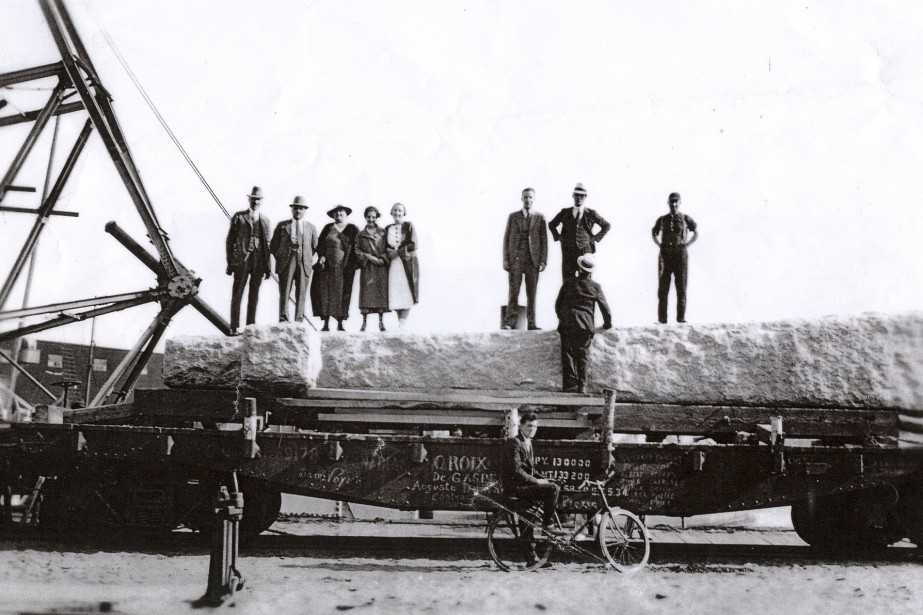
Transporting the granite cross by rail, 1934

The cross was carved in 1934 from a single block of grey granite, extracted from the Auguste Dumas quarry in Rivière-à-Pierre, Quebec. The cross weighs more than 42 tons and was transported to Quebec City on two cars by rail from Rivière-à-Pierre. The cross was then carried on a coaster to the Gaspé dock. From the dock, the cross was drawn on rollers using hoists by one of the first tractors to be used in Gaspé and raised using a rail system of pulleys and cables, driven by the strength of many horses and a tractor.

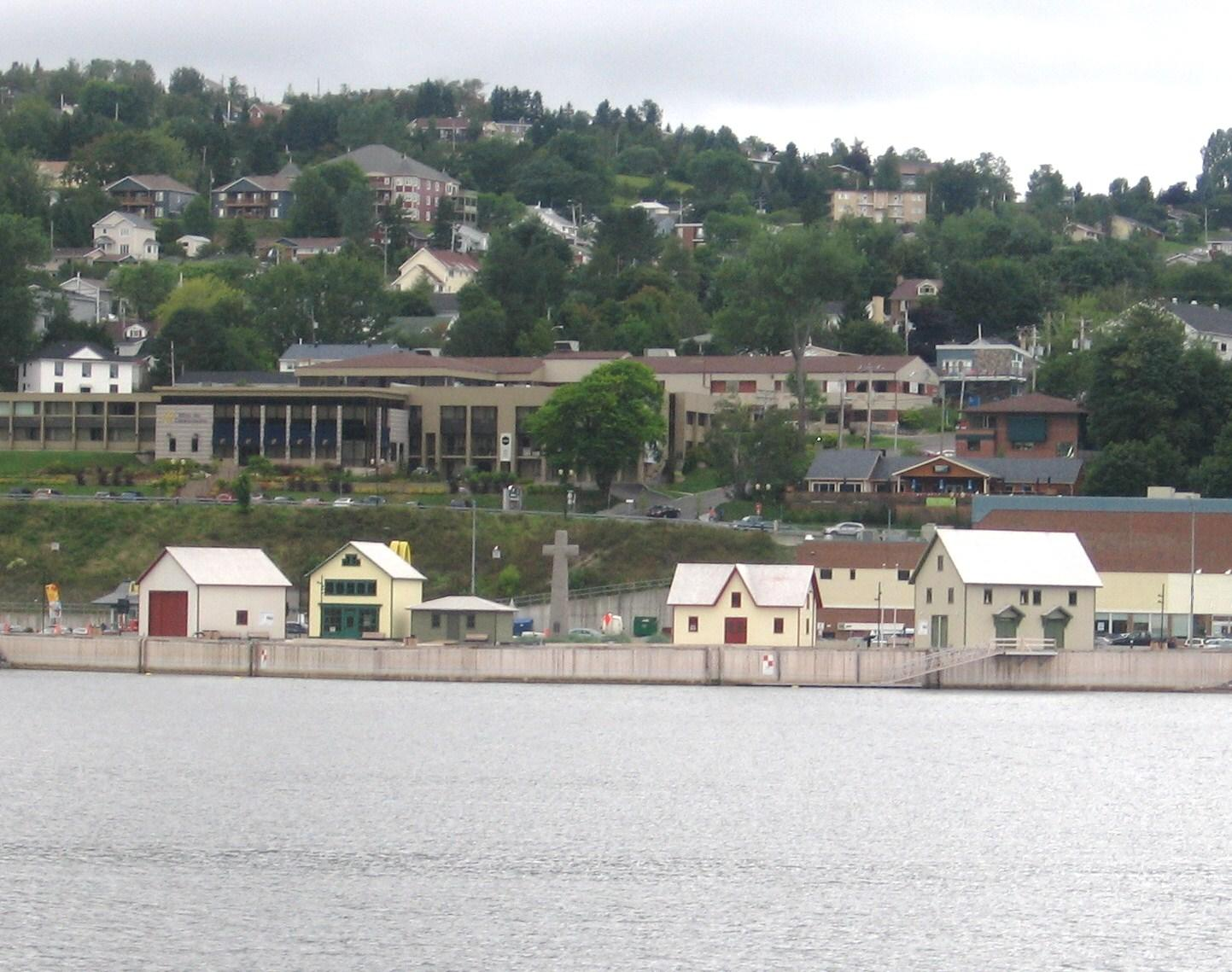
Monolithic granite cross in Gaspé

A commemorative plaque located at the foot of the cross of Gaspé was inaugurated on August 23, 2009 (75 years after the erection of the granite cross), in memory of artisans of Rivière-à-Pierre, Quebec who extracted and cut this block of granite which become the monolithic cross.

The Cross of Gaspé has been located at three sites in Gaspé. From 1934 to 1979 it was on Queen Street facing the current "Place Jacques-Cartier" business centre, on the same site of a Second World War memorial. From 1979 to Fall 2012 it stood on the grounds of the Cathedral of Christ-Roi. In October 2012, it was moved to a new site "Gaspé, Berceau du Canada" (Gaspé, Cradle of Canada), on the water near the Gaspé bridge.

== Replica of the cross at Rivière-à-Pierre (Quebec, Canada) ==
A replica of the cross was cut by Rivière-à-Pierre craftsmen and erected in the heart of the village of Rivière-à-Pierre located in Batiscanie, in the province of Quebec, Canada. This cross of granite is half the height of the original cross of Gaspé.

== Cross of Saint-Malo, France ==
A cross was erected at the Solidor Tower in (Saint-Malo), France to mark the erection of a wooden cross on July 24, 1534 by the French explorer Jacques Cartier in Gaspé.
