= L'Assomption (disambiguation) =

L'Assomption is a city in Quebec, Canada.

L'Assomption may also refer to:

- L'Assomption Regional County Municipality in Quebec
- L'Assomption (provincial electoral district), a provincial electoral district in Quebec
- L'Assomption (federal electoral district), a former federal electoral district in Quebec
- Joliette—L'Assomption—Montcalm, a former federal electoral district in Quebec
- L'Assomption River, a river in Quebec
- L'Assomption station, a former railway station in Quebec

== See also ==
- Assomption (Montreal Metro), a station on the Montreal Metro (subway)
