= La Tuque station =

Railway station in Quebec, Canada

La Tuque
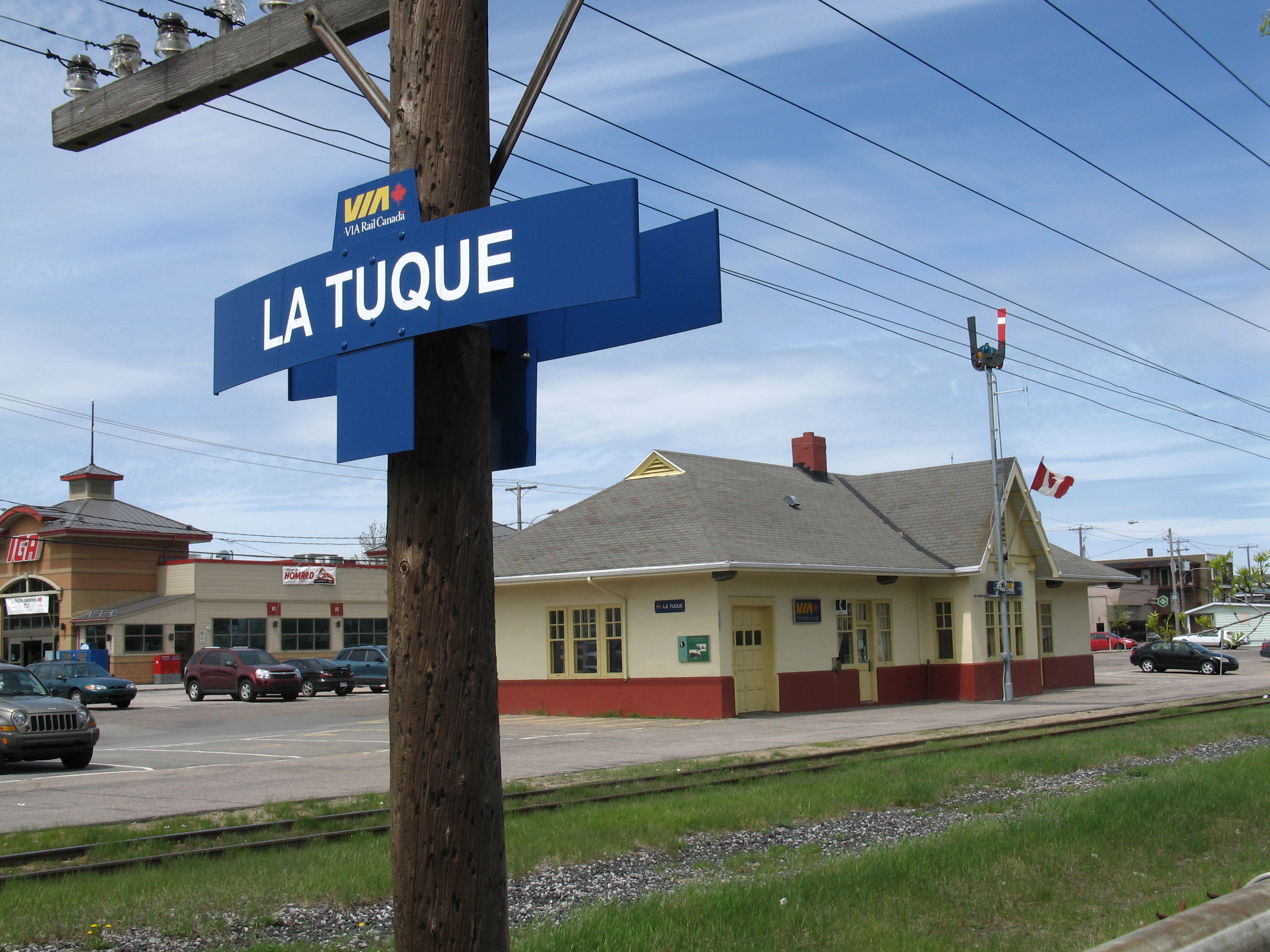
- La Tuque station

General information
- Coordinates: 47°26′22″N 72°46′57″W

Construction
- Structure type: Staffed station

Services
Preceding station	Via Rail	Following station
Fitzpatrick toward Senneterre	Montreal–Senneterre	Hervey toward Montreal
Former services
Preceding station	Canadian National Railway	Following station
Fitzpatrick toward Cochrane	Cochrane – Quebec	St. Maurice Club toward Quebec
Location

La Tuque station is a Via Rail station in La Tuque, Quebec, Canada. It is located on Rue St-Louis and is staffed. The platform is accessible by wheelchair, but there is no other wheelchair access.
