= Hébertville station =

Railway station in Quebec, Canada

Hébertville
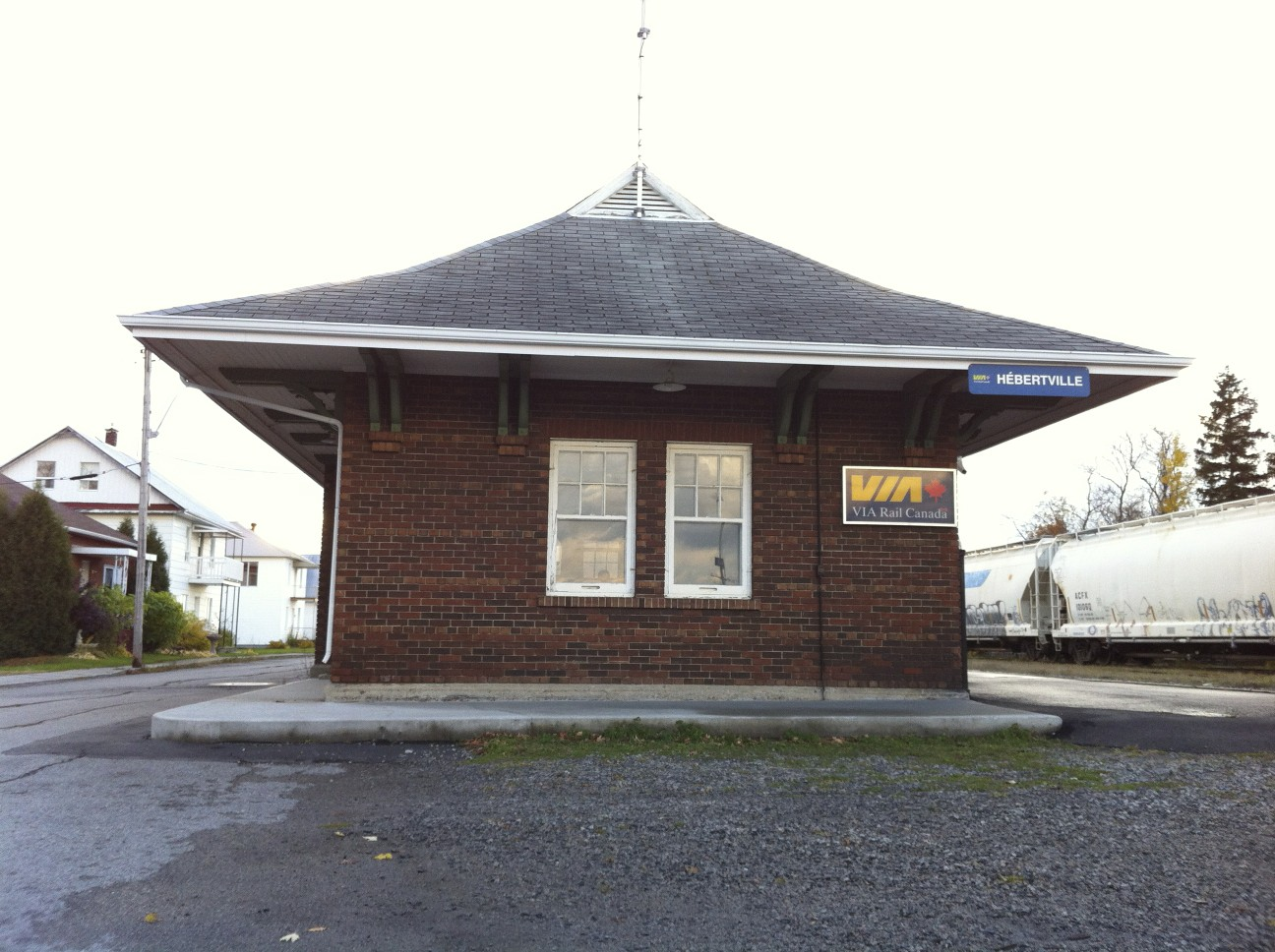
- View of the station in 2012

General information
- Coordinates: 48.4433°N 71.6627°W

Other information
- Status: Sign post

Services
Preceding station	Via Rail	Following station
Jonquière Terminus	Montreal–Jonquière	Chambord toward Montreal
Former services
Preceding station	Canadian National Railway	Following station
St. Gédéon toward Quebec	Quebec – Chicoutimi	Saguenay Power toward Chicoutimi
Location

Hébertville station is a Via Rail station in Hébertville, Quebec, Canada. It is located on Rue St-Louis, 3 km south of Saint-Bruno. It is designated a Heritage Railway Station of Canada.
