= Société de transport du Saguenay =

Public transport organization in Saguenay, Québec

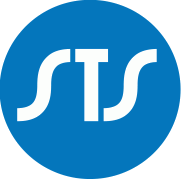

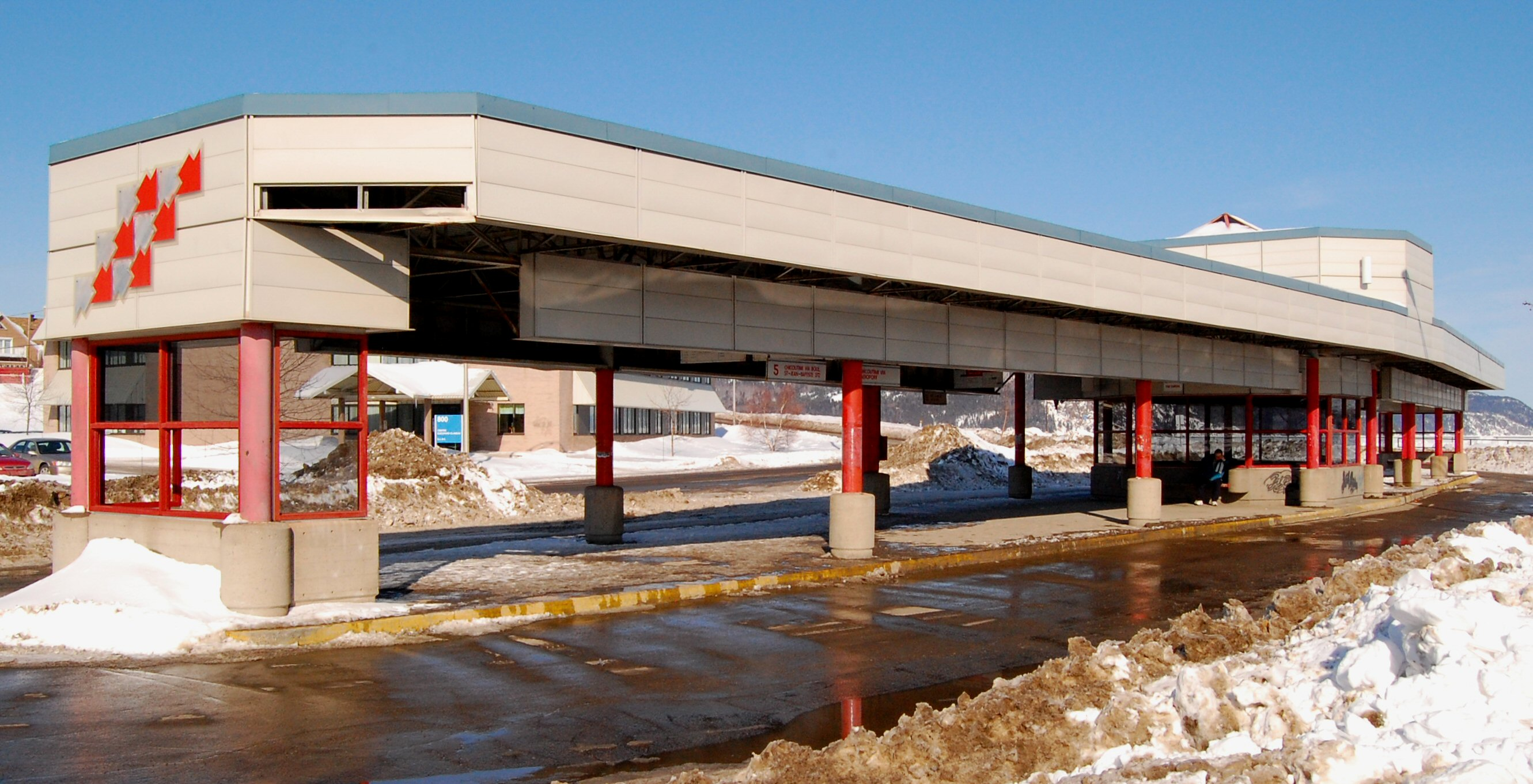
- Terminal at La Baie
- Founded: 2002
- Headquarters: 1330, rue Bersimis; Saguenay, Quebec; G7K 1A5
- Locale: Saguenay, Quebec
- Service type: Bus service, paratransit
- Routes: 36
- Hubs: 3
- Website: French language site

Société de transport du Saguenay (STS) is the public transport company in Saguenay, Quebec, Canada, formerly the Corporation intermunicipale de transport du Saguenay (CITS). They operate from three main terminals located in the boroughs of Chicoutimi, Jonquière and La Baie. The network covers a large part of the city including industrial, commercial and residential areas, with interurban links between the former municipalities and to the townships of Laterrière in the south and Shipshaw and Tremblay in the north.

== Services ==
A variety of services is provided including: regular public transit; specialized transport for people with disabilities; school bus services; charter coach services; special events transportation. To use the paratransit service, you must complete an eligibility form and be approved by a committee composed of health care professionals, people representing persons with disabilities and a member of the company.

== Routes ==
=== Regular Routes ===
- 4 - Centre d'achat via Université
- 10 - Notre Dame du Saguenay
- 11 - St. Paul
- 11C - Chicoutimi via St. Paul
- 11J - Jonquière via St. Paul
- 12 - Riviere-du-Moulin
- 14 - Coopérative
- 15N - Centre-ville via Talbot/centres d'achats
- 15S - Boulevard du Royaume via centres d'achats/Talbot
- 16 - Côte de la Réserve
- 18/18J - Des Écrivains
- 20 - Sainte-Claire
- 21 - Boulevard Sainte-Geneviève
- 22 - Vanier/Constantin
- 23 - Aréna du Plateau via Côte Verdun
- 24 - Saint-Luc
- 30 - Les Galeries
- 31 - Saint-Raphaël
- 32 - Saint-Georges
- 33 - Saint-André
- 34 - Kénogami
- 35 - Des Oiseaux/Petite-France
- 36 - Cépal
- 37 - Terminus Jonquière via Ste-Émilie/Faubourg Sagamie via Cégep
- 38 - Saint-Jacques/Plateau Deschênes
- 39 - Carré Davis/Saint-Philippe
- 43 - Faubourg vers Rond-Point
- 50 - Des Érables
- 51 - Polyvalente La Baie
- 52 - Boulevard de la Grande-Baie
- 54 - Chemin St-Louis
- 60 - Secteur de Laterrière/St-Pierre - St-Paul
- 62 - Secteur de Laterrière/St-Isidore - de l'Église

=== Long Distance Routes ===
- 2 - Chicoutimi/Jonquière via Boulevard de Royaume
- 3 - Chicoutimi/Jonquière via Boulevard du Saguenay
- 5 - La Baie/Chicoutimi via Boulevard St-Jean-Baptiste
- 6 - La Baie/Chicoutimi via Aéroport
- 65 - Chicoutimi à Canton Tremblay/Shipshaw/St-Ambroise
- 67 - Jonquière à Shipshaw/St-Ambroise
