= Christ the King Cathedral (Gaspé) =

Coordinates: 48.8297°N 64.4867°W

- Cathédrale du Christ-Roi de Gaspé
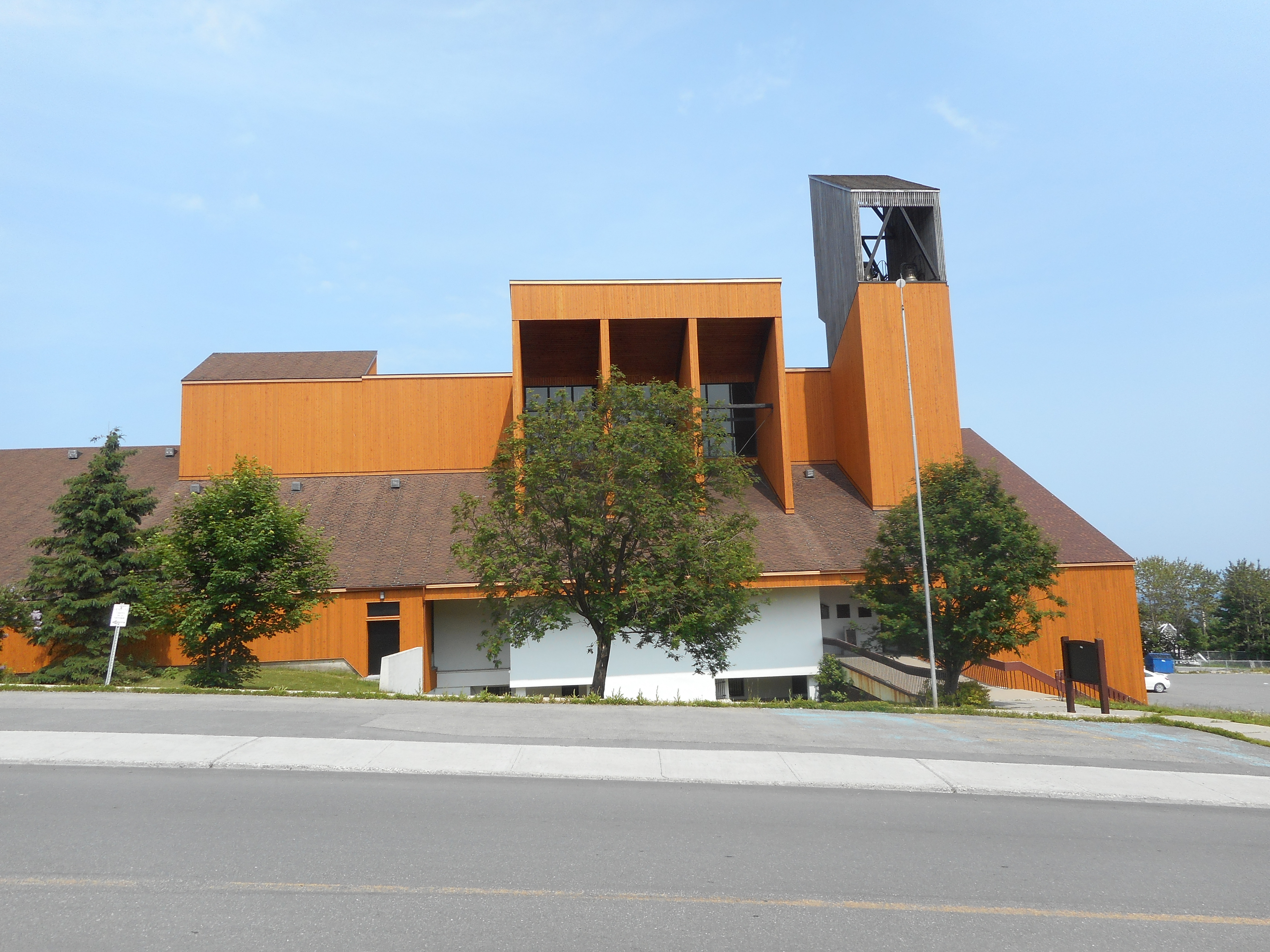
- Christ the King Cathedral
- Location: Gaspé, Quebec
- Country: Canada
- Denomination: Roman Catholic

History
- Dedication: Christ the King
- Consecrated: 1969

Architecture
- Architect: Gérard Notebaert
- Style: Shed style
- Years built: 1968–1969

Christ the King Cathedral (French: Cathédrale du Christ-Roi de Gaspé) is a church building in the city of Gaspé, Quebec, in eastern Canada. Located on rue de la Cathédrale, adjacent to the Saint-Rosaire Gaspé Elementary School, it is the only wooden cathedral in North America.

== History ==
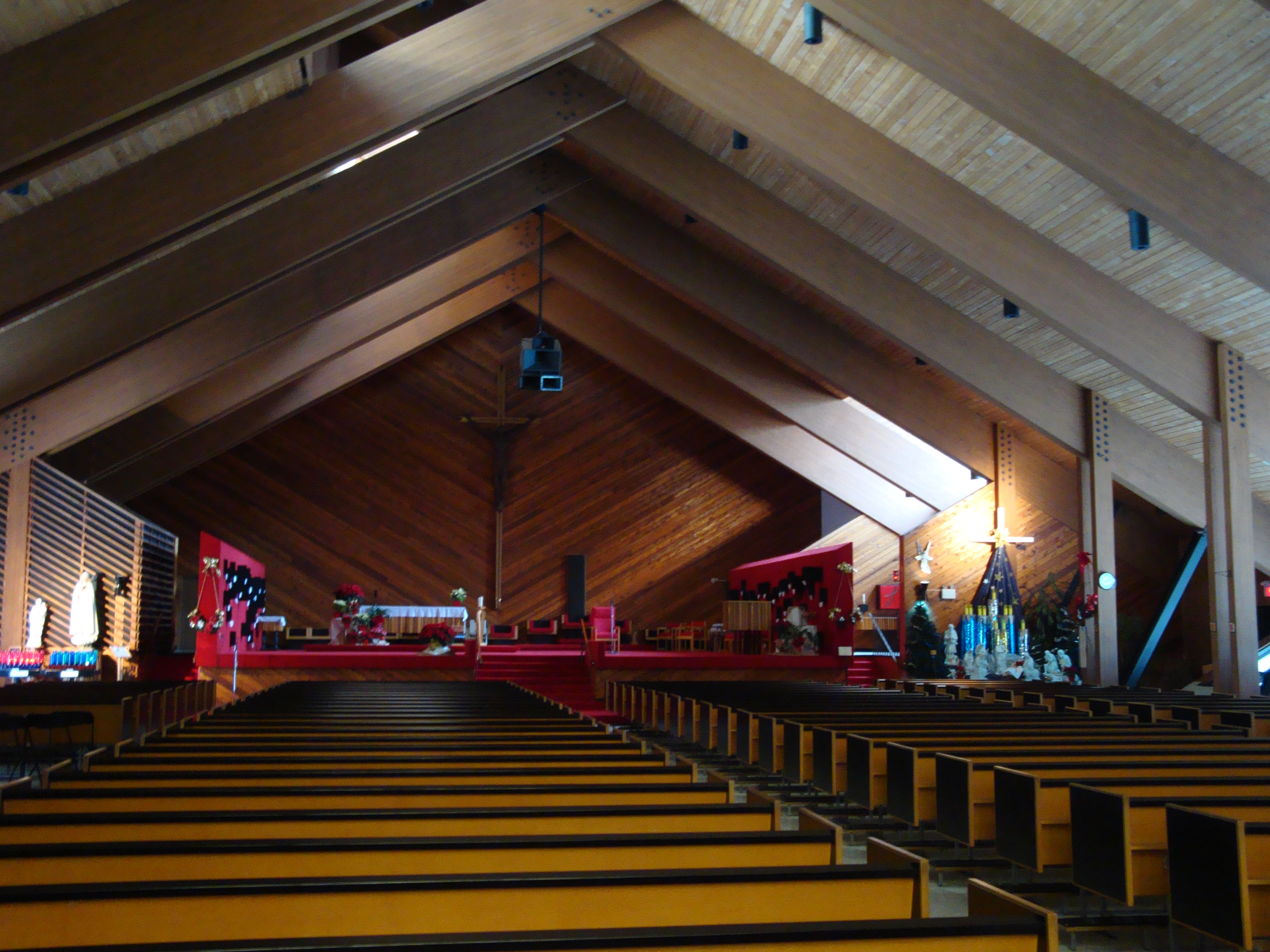
Interior view

The first two places of worship erected in Gaspé to meet the needs of the Catholic population were simple chapels; the first was built around 1825 and the second in 1860.

During the creation of the Diocese of Gaspé by Pope Pius XI on May 5, 1922, the parish church of St. Albert was promoted to the status of cathedral. The appointment of the first bishop of the diocese, Bishop François-Xavier Ross, was held in December 1922, but he could not reach Gaspé to take charge and organize the diocese until February 1923. The first cathedral was destroyed by a fire in March 1929.

It was not until the mid-1960s that Bishop Jean-Marie Fortier commissioned the Montreal architect Gérard Notebaert (1937–1979) to design a new cathedral for the Diocese of Gaspé. Bishop Gilles Ouellet consecrated the building in 1969.

On January 25, 2001, the Cathedral of Christ the King was recognized as a historic monument by the Ministry of Culture and Communications of Quebec.

== See also ==
- Roman Catholicism in Canada
