= Chicoutimi station =

Railway station in Quebec, Canada

Coordinates: 48.431°N 71.082°W

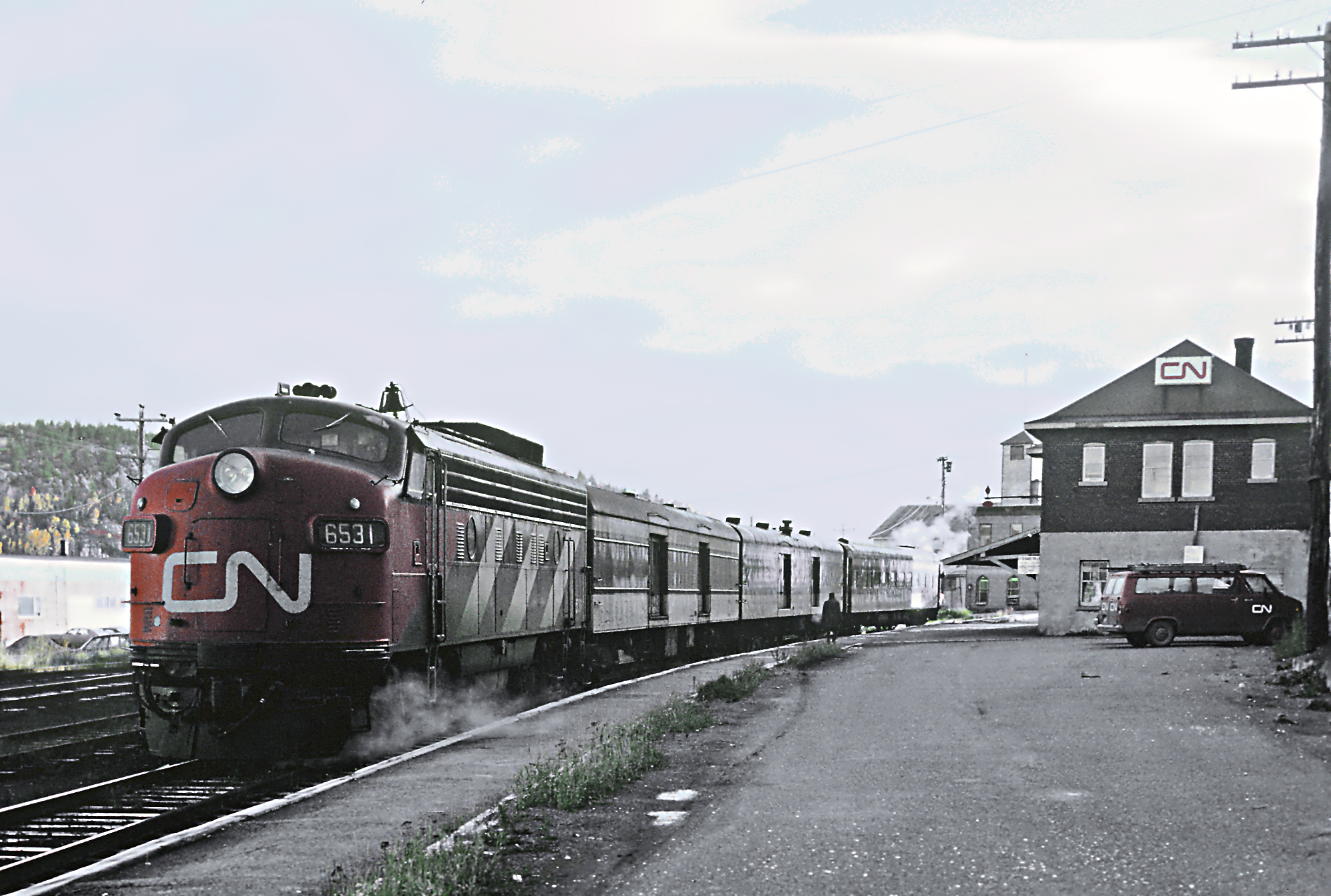
- Train at the station in 1971

General information
- Location: Canada
Location

Chicoutimi station is a former Canadian National Railway Company railway station in the Chicoutimi borough of the city of Saguenay in Quebec's Saguenay–Lac-Saint-Jean region.

When the station was built, it was adjacent to Chicoutimi's port.

All train service to Chicoutimi ended in 1988. On April 29, 1988, the Railway Transport Committee of the Canadian Transport Commission authorized CN to abandon its line between Ha Ha Bay Junction and Chicoutimi, and CN and VIA Rail to abandon passenger service between Jonquière and Chicoutimi.

The building is still in use, following controversial renovations in 1995, but is no longer connected to the railway network.

== Sources ==
- Bouchard, Russel; Tremblay, Éric (2001). "L'édifice de la gare de Chicoutimi". Saguenayensia (in French). 43 (1). Société historique du Saguenay: 3.
- Tremblay, Eric; Bouchard, Russel (2000). Petite histoire de l'édifice de la gare de Chicoutimi (in French). Les Immeubles Murdock. p. 28.
