= Rivière-à-Pierre =

- Municipality
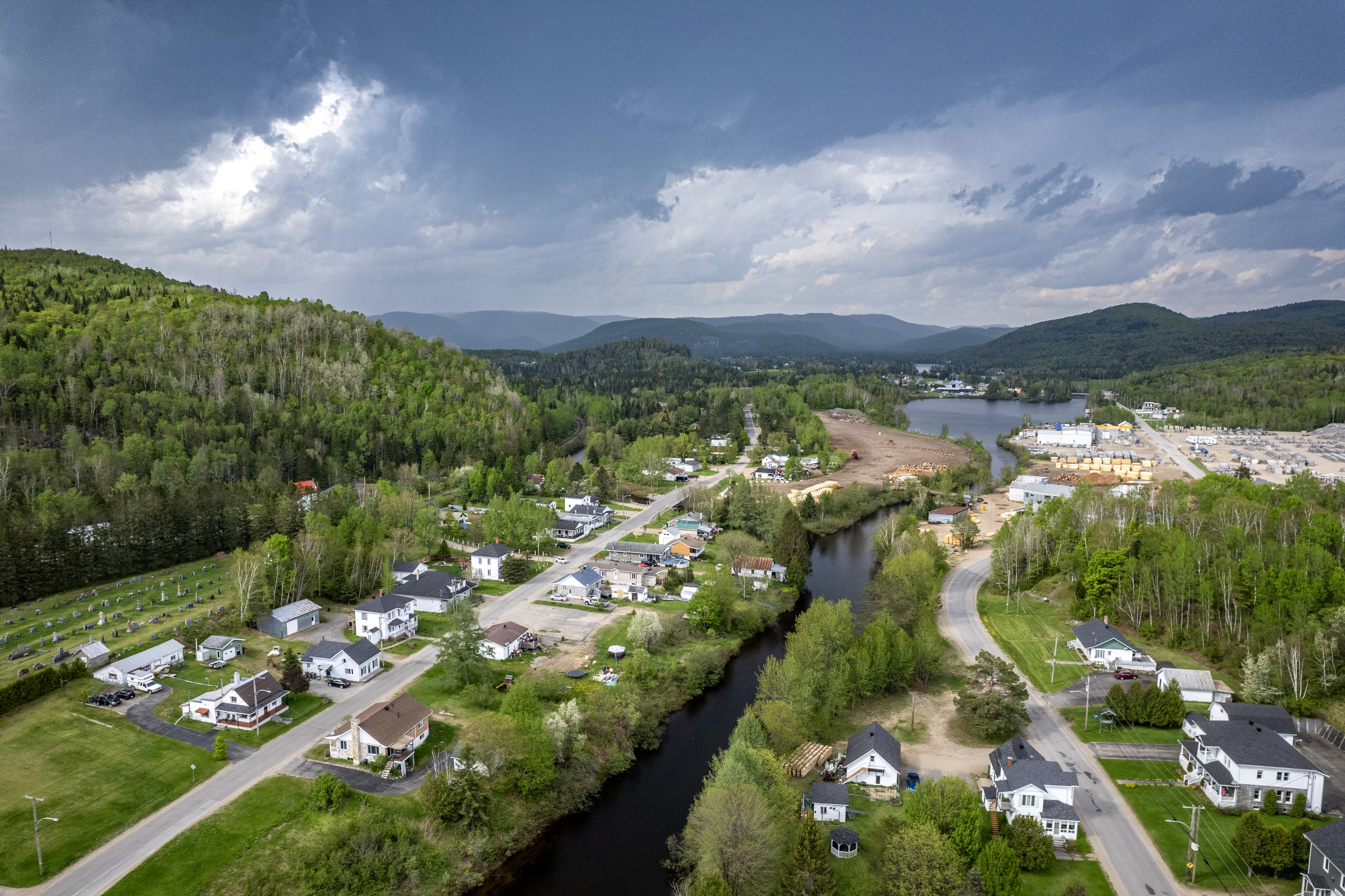

- Coat of arms Logo
- Motto: Paix et fidélité (Peace and loyalty)
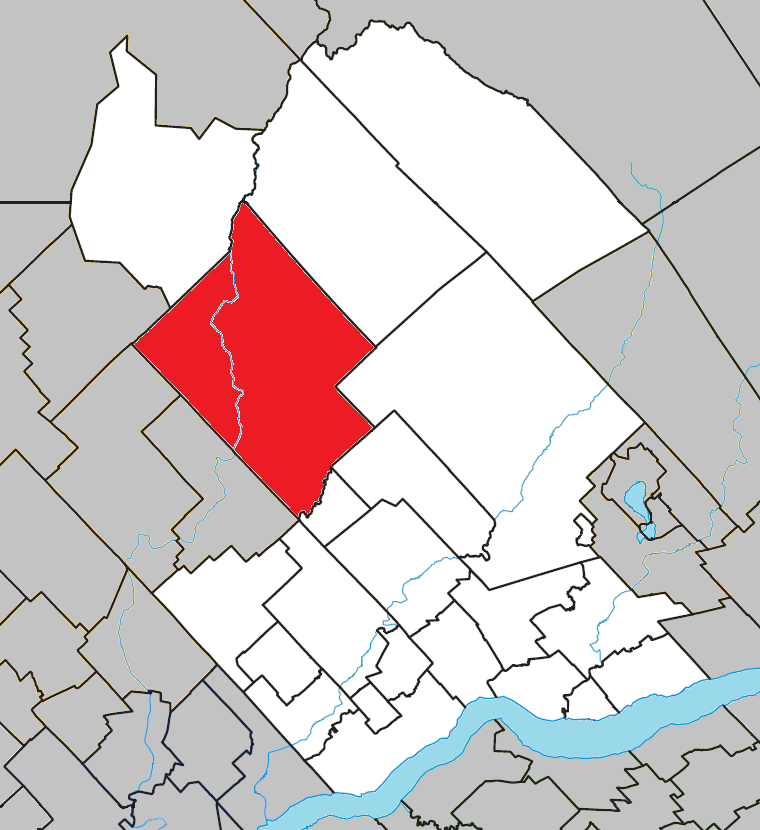
- Location within Portneuf RCM

- Location in central Quebec
- Coordinates: 46°59′N 72°11′W
- Country: Canada
- Province: Quebec
- Region: Capitale-Nationale
- RCM: Portneuf
- Settled: 1880
- Constituted: October 11, 1897

Government
  - Mayor: Danielle Ouellet
  - Fed. riding: Saint-Augustin—Portneuf—Jacques-Cartier
  - Prov. riding: Portneuf

Area
  - Total: 537.73 km^{2} (207.62 sq mi)
  - Land: 515.62 km^{2} (199.08 sq mi)

Population (2021)
  - Total: 625
  - Density: 1.2/km^{2} (3.1/sq mi)
  - Pop (2016–21): ▲7%
  - Dwellings: 609
- Time zone: UTC−5 (EST)
  - Summer (DST): UTC−4 (EDT)
- Postal code(s): G0A 3A0
- Area codes: 418 and 581
- Highways: R-367
- Website: www.riviereapierre.com

Rivière-à-Pierre (French pronunciation: [ʁivjɛʁ a pjɛʁ]) is a municipality of the Portneuf Regional County Municipality, in the administrative region of the Capitale-Nationale, Quebec, Canada. This area of the Laurentian Mountains is part of the Batiscanie and has more than 200 lakes. The village of Rivière-à-Pierre was developed on each side of the river that bears its name. Rivière-à-Pierre is the second largest municipality in the Portneuf RCM in terms of area.

The Rivière-à-Pierre railway station, located in the village is served by Via Rail.

== Etymology ==
The name "Rivière-à-Pierre", used as Rivière-à-Pierre since at least 1829 by the surveyor Jean-Pierre Proulx, was recorded on December 5, 1968, to the register of the Commission de toponymie du Québec (Toponymic Commission of Quebec). As the riverbed was once considered very rocky and flows through many crags, it seemed quite natural to assign this name, which was adopted by the municipality in 1948."

== History ==
The first settlers arrived in Rivière-à-Pierre around 1880, living off forestry and agriculture. The first pioneers acquired lands around lac Vert (Green Lake), upstream of the village. The place was known at that time as the Mission du canton de Bois (Mission of Bois Township), named after Louis-Édouard Bois (1813–1889), former priest of Maskinongé and historian of French Canada.

Shortly thereafter, granite was discovered, which led to the development of granite quarries. The arrival of the Lower Laurentian Railway in 1888 brought more people and more business to the town. Simultaneously, the exploitation of granite became the predominant industry in Rivière-à-Pierre.

In 1884, the mission of Saint-Bernardin-de-Sienne was formed.

In 1885, the railroad linking Quebec City to Lac Saint-Jean reached the fledgling village of Rivière-à-Pierre, resulting in the arrival of new settlers. That same year, the post office and the Rivière-à-Pierre railway station opened, followed by the chapel in 1890. In 1897, the municipality of canton de Bois (Bois Township) was established, with Joseph-N. Perron as first mayor.

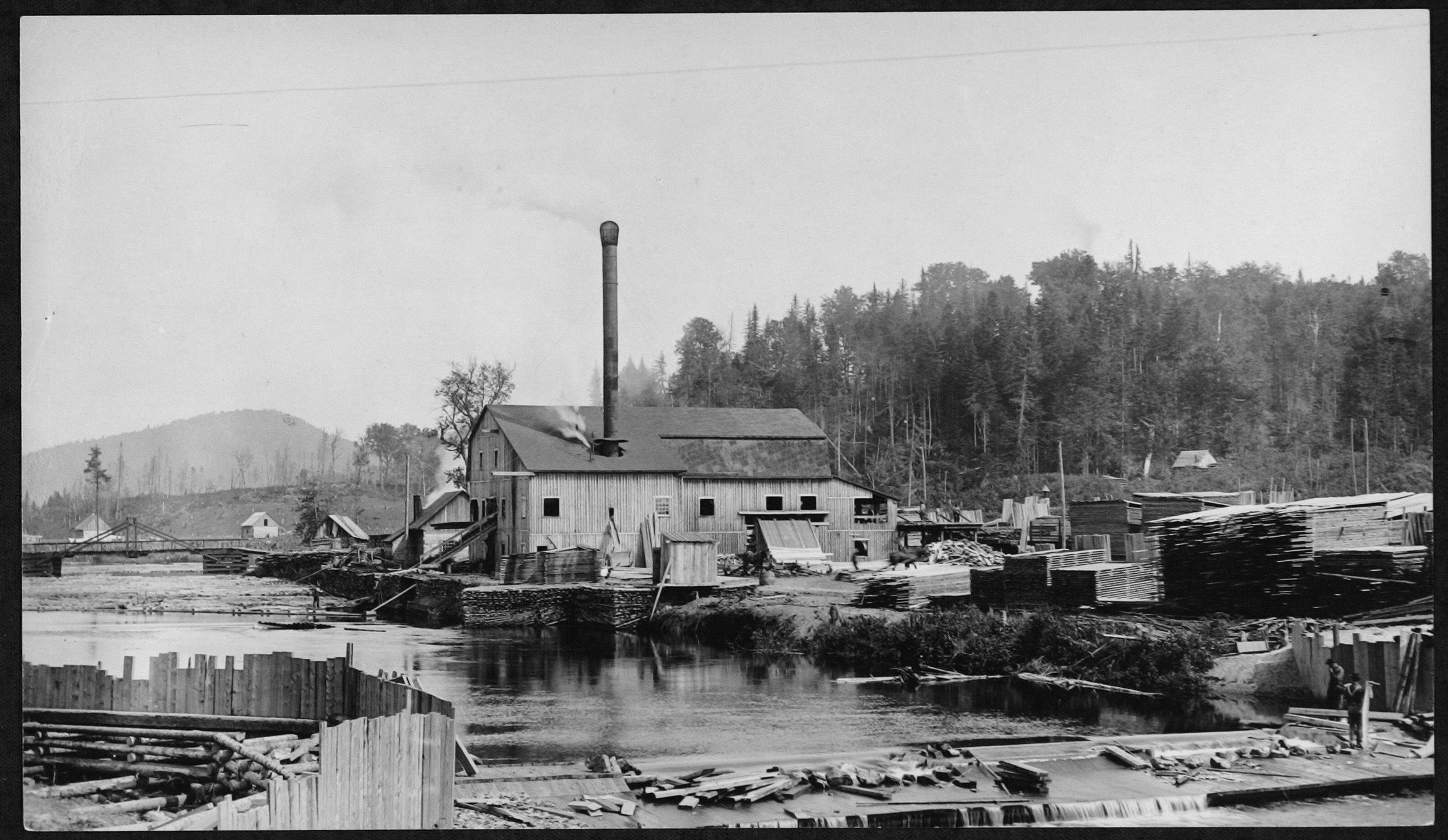
Rivière-à-Pierre circa 1900

In 1908, the mission of Saint-Bernardin-de-Sienne was officially elevated and canonically established as a parish.

In 1928, an electricity company was established, operating a hydroelectric dam in the Chute de la Marmite (Kettle Falls) located north of the village. In 1947, the Shawinigan Water & Power Company acquired this local power company.

The Saint-Raymond Road was built in 1936 (not paved until 1976). Before 1936, the only road suitable for motor vehicles was the one between Rivière-à-Pierre and Notre-Dame-des-Anges. In 1948, Township Municipality of Bois changed its name and statutes to become the Municipality of Rivière-à-Pierre.

Saint George College was built in 1938. From 1903, the boarding school École Saint-Joseph du Sacré-Coeur educated the town's children. Nuns of the Servants of Saint-Coeur-de-Marie operated this school until its closure in 1970. This former convent served as a day school from 1970 until 1982 when the new Saint-Coeur-de-Marie school was opened. The convent was demolished in 1986 to erect a community centre.

In 1968, the Portneuf Wildlife Reserve was established.

In 1990, the citizens of Rivière-à-Pierre celebrated the centenary of the parish. A millennium monument in grey granite was unveiled.

== Demographics ==
=== Population ===
Historical Census Data - Rivière-à-Pierre, Quebec

Year	Pop.	±%
1901	729	—
1911	848	+16.3%
1921	842	−0.7%
1931	815	−3.2%
1941	896	+9.9%
1951	953	+6.4%
1956	860	−9.8%

Year	Pop.	±%
1961	873	+1.5%
1966	792	−9.3%
1971	791	−0.1%
1976	662	−16.3%
1981	690	+4.2%
1986	682	−1.2%
1991	672	−1.5%

Year	Pop.	±%
1996	694	+3.3%
2001	689	−0.7%
2006	694	+0.7%
2011	671	−3.3%
2016	584	−13.0%
2021	625	+7.0%

Source: Statistics Canada

Private dwellings occupied by usual residents (2021): 328 (total dwellings: 609)

=== Language ===
Mother tongue (2021)
Language	Population	Pct (%)
French only	620	99.2%
English only	5	0.8%

== Economy ==
Rivière-à-Pierre is a gateway to the Portneuf Wildlife Reserve, bringing many visitors, campers, hikers, hunters and fishermen into this wilderness. Until 1968, many private clubs were active in this area. Its territory is sparsely populated and dotted with many lakes, bringing cottagers to the municipality during the summer. The resorts contribute significantly to the local economy.

Rivière-à-Pierre is an important extraction center of architectural stones in Quebec. In Rivière-à-Pierre, many homes and public buildings include granite in their architecture: exterior walls, columns, sidewalks, driveway pavers, patios, stairs, galleries, etc. Stonemasons and stone engravers also use their talents to produce various accessories in granite: picnic tables, fences, poles, street numbers of houses, desks, benches, stands, ornaments, etc.

== Attractions ==
=== Multi-functional track ===
The Rivière-à-Pierre railway station is the terminal point (at the 68th km) of the Jacques Cartier/Portneuf multi-functional track, which is referred to as the no. 6 of the Route verte from 2007. The development project of this track was initiated in 1993 by leaders of the region and was officially opened to the public in July 1998. Thanks to the efforts of municipalities of the Portneuf regional county municipality (RCM) and La Jacques-Cartier RCM for the acquisition of land. This track has been built on the right-of-way of the old disused CNR railway, designated "Corridor des cheminots ("Corridor of Railroad employees"), linking Rivière-à-Pierre to Shannon. From Rivière-à-Pierre, the former railway corridor crosses, from east to west, a series of villages in Portneuf County generally in parallel of Route 367:

- St. Leonard de Portneuf (km 39.3),
- Saint-Raymond (km 32.5),
- Lac-Sergent (km 21.7),
- Sainte-Catherine-de-la-Jacques-Cartier (km 14),
- Shannon (km 4.6),
- Saint-Gabriel-de-Valcartier (km 0).

This track has various service points (nearby) for walkers accommodation: restaurant, convenience store, public restrooms, rest areas, shelters, picnic tables, a few water points, parking, etc. It also offers enchanting scenery and observation sites (e.g.: the "Chute à l'ours" (fall of the bear) at km. 48.5) with lookouts. This track also connects to other trails (e.g. track Dansereau at 16th km, between Pont-Rouge and Sainte-Catherine-de-la-Jacques-Cartier) or mountain bike tracks. In summer, this "route verte" (Green road) track is mostly taken by cyclists, walkers and rollerbladers, and in winter, by followers of rackets, skiing or walking.

In Rivière-à-Pierre, the Municipal Council has contributed to the development on the edge of the track, including the construction of a docking station with permanent toilets. In addition, companies granite Rivière-à-Pierre have fabricated picnic tables in granite at the reception.

=== Granite quarry ===
At the beginning of the colonization of Rivière-à-Pierre, the operation of granite stone was a craftsman approach. The stone was cut by hand tools using the power men's force. Granite industry has grown with the arrival of the railway Grand Trunk which came to the village in 1888 from the "Basse Mauricie" (Lower Mauricie). This railway connects the Mauricie to Lac Saint-Jean. The first major quarries were those of Joseph-N. Perron and Fortunat Voyer in 1894. The pink granite of the Langelier building in the city of Quebec came from the quarry of Fortunat Voyer.

In the early 20th century, near the village, two new pink granite quarries started their production, one of which has provided the equivalent of two thousand wagons of stone used in the erection of pillars of Quebec Bridge in 1907. From 1920 to 1960, new quarries started for the extraction of pink granite.

In 1938, the merger of companies Dumas and Arthur Fortunat Voyer et Fils, which began the new company Dumas et Voyer, contributed to the growth of the industry according to Quebec Natural Resources website.

In 2005, 17 quarries producing panels and slices of stone, which serve in a variety of stone products, including monuments, walks, curbs, paving stones, the collection of buildings, making tile. Stonemasons also shape parts ordered on stones.

The 1960s marked the operational phase the most significant in the history of Rivière-à-Pierre, while 18 new granite quarries come into activities. The extraction of green granite began in 1961, by the "White Diamond Granite" company. This variety of granite, designated Forest Green or Green Atlantic, became popular after being chosen as the materials for the erection in 1983 of the headquarters building of the IBM company in New York City. Two new quarries producing brown granite, began in 1962 by Dumas et Voyer company; the variety Caledonia is extracted and is particularly known for its purity.

Since the discovery of granite Rivière-à-Pierre, fifty quarries were exploited. In the second half of the 19th century, small family quarries and/or craftsmen have been replaced or acquired by larger companies. Modern facilities for sawing stone and transport have supplanted the old means of extraction.

=== Granite Interpretation Centre ===
Built in 1947, the fire tower built in front of the town hall, formerly used for drying fire hoses in village of Rivière-à-Pierre. Today, this building is occupied by the Granite Interpretation Centre. The fire tower is one of the few still remaining in Quebec.

This fire tower building was renovated in 2002 by the municipality. Craftsmen of companies working in the granite in Rivière-à-Pierre contributed to its development, particularly in manufacturing picnic tables at the reception of the multifunctional trail Jacques-Cartier/Portneuf. Formed at the initiative of the citizens of Rivière-à-Pierre, interpretation center, which began operations in the summer of 2002, highlights the granite which is a plutonic rock composed of quartz, mica and feldspar crystallized in form of grains visible to the eye. According to geologists, there are at least twelve different kinds of granites coming from granite quarries in Rivière-à-Pierre, which are not all commercially exploited. This granite is one of the finest natural and distinctive, which is widely recognized in Quebec in Canada and the rest of the North America for its quality and its color. This stone is also exported globally, including Japan, Australia, Spain, Taiwan and South Korea.

The Granite Interpretation Centre in the village of Rivière-à-Pierre presents in-depth operations, processing, transport, market and derived products from granite. The Centre highlights that, in 1934, during the commemoration of the 400th anniversary of the arrival of Jacques Cartier in North America, the parish of Canton (Township) Bois (now referred to as "Municipality of Rivière-à-Pierre") has contributed to the erection of the Cross of Gaspé. This monolithic cross inaugurated on August 25, 1934, in Gaspé, was cut in the "Carrière Auguste Dumas et Cie" (Quarry of Auguste Dumas & Cie) in Rivière-à-Pierre.

Stonemasons and stone engravers have the merit of having contributed to many granite architectural works from Rivière-à-Pierre, including: Olympia York, Toronto Dominion, Battery Park New York, the National War Memorial near the Canadian Parliament in Ottawa, Quebec Bridge pillars, The Citadel (Quebec), metros stations in Montreal, Grand Séminaire de Québec, Basilica of Sainte-Anne-de-Beaupré as of 1923 which burned on March 29, 1922, curbs and roads in Quebec, in Ontario, in New Brunswick and in United States, base sections of the Statue of Liberty in New York City, Parthenais Building in Montreal built around 1965, skyscraper Philip Morris in New York City built in 1982–83, along the quay walls of the Saint-Charles River in the Quebec City... Almost all cemeteries Quebec have tombstones and monuments, includes pieces of granite which were extracted (and/or cut) at Rivière-à-Pierre in the history.

Located in front of City Hall (835 rue Principale (Main Street), Rivière-à-Pierre – Tel.: 418-323-2112), the Granite Interpretation Centre is open to visitors during the summer season.

=== "Marmite" Fall ===
At 4,4 km from the center of the village; or 2.2 km northeast of the "Lake of the farm", in the North-East, along the "rivière-à-Pierre" road, the "Chute de la marmite" (fall of the pot) has particular geological character. On a long run, the rushing waters of the river worn the rock creating many pots ("marmites" in French). The site "Chute de la Marmite" is ideal for nature lovers and a public park was built around. From 1928, the Electricity Company operated a hydroelectric dam at the "Marmite Fall". In addition, the Eastern front door "Rivière-à-Pierre" of the Portneuf Wildlife Reserve is situated in the Fall of Marmite.

=== Railway station ===
The Montreal-Jonquière rail link is still in operation, both for the transport of goods and for travellers. Rivière-à-Pierre railway station is still used to serve travellers. A while ago, the railway line that once linked Rivière-à-Pierre directly to Quebec (through the Portneuf County) was dismantled. The Jacques-Cartier/Portneuf multifunctional trail has been built on the foundations of the former Canadian National Railway line.

=== Church and rectory ===
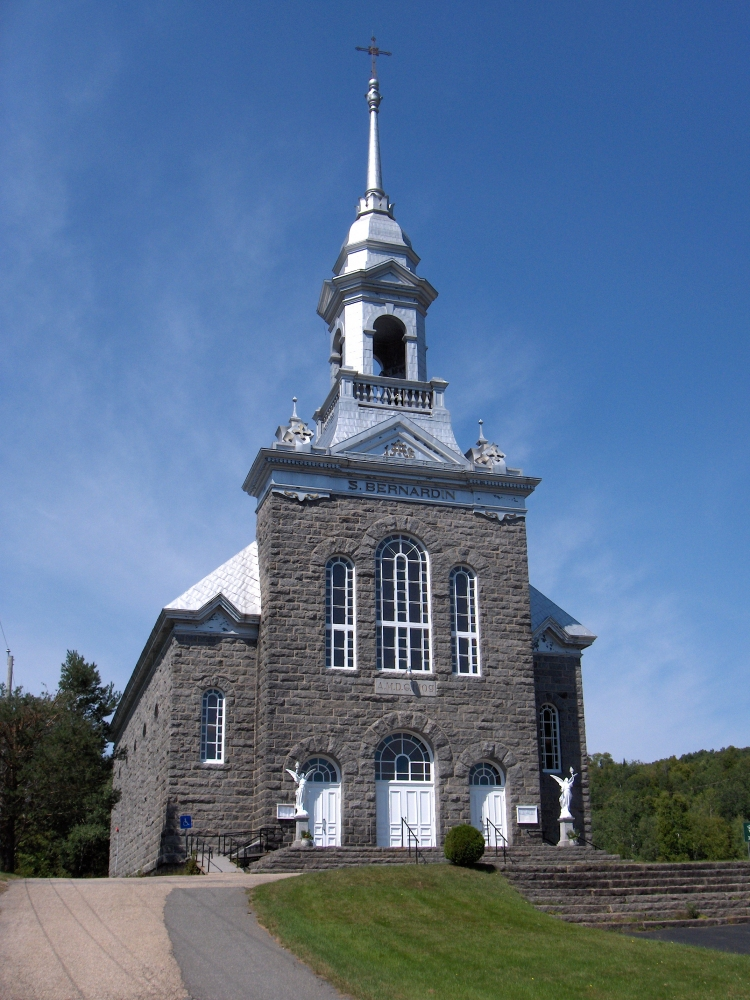
Church Saint-Bernardin in Rivière-à-Pierre

The Catholic parish of "Saint-Bernardin-de-Sienne" (St. Bernardine of Siena) was established canonically in 1908. The church was built in 1909 based on plans designed by the architect Joseph-Georges Bussières. Granite of Rivière-à-Pierre has been used for the erection St. Bernardin's Church, the presbytery and the replica of the cross of Gaspé. The flight of steps and two large staircases, in front of the church, are also made of gray granite stone. On August 22, 1937, a pulpit of carved granite built in three monolithics pieces by Jos Lassonde, Patrice Tremblay and Omer Laroche was installed in the Church of "Saint-Bernardin" (St. Bernardin) at Rivière-à-Pierre. On 14 May 1954, the pulpit was transported to Montmartre Canadian, on Blvd. Saint-Louis, Quebec City. Then 36 years later, during celebrations of the centenary of Rivière-à-Pierre in 1990, this pulpit was returned to Rivière-à-Pierre.

=== Replica of the cross of Gaspé ===
A replica of the cross of Gaspé was built in the village of Rivière-à-Pierre. This cross is half of the height of the original cross of Gaspé erected in Gaspé.

The monolithic original cross installed in Gaspé had been cut in 1934, from a block of gray granite extracted from the career of Auguste Dumas at Rivière-à-Pierre. This cross of Gaspé that weighs more than 42 tons, was transported by two railway wagon from Rivière-à-Pierre. Then the cross was carried on a coaster to dock of Gaspé. This cross was erected on its base using a rail system of pulleys and cables, driven by the strength of many horses. A commemorative plaque, located at the foot of the cross of Gaspé, was inaugurated on August 23, 2009, in memory of artisans of Rivière-à-Pierre who extracted and cut the block of stone, which became a monolithic cross.

Built in 1934 and sponsored by the federal government to commemorate the 400th anniversary of the arrival of French explorer Jacques Cartier in Gaspé Bay, July 24, 1534, the Gaspé cross is 32 feet in height. The original craftsmen would be listed at the top.

== Government ==
The parish of the canton Wood was established civil Oct. 11, 1897.

First mayor: Josph-N. Perron from 1893. Actual mayor: Ghislaine Noreau, since 2009.

== See also ==
- Portneuf Regional Natural Park
