= Montreal–Senneterre train =

Passenger train service between Montreal and Senneterre, Quebec

- Combined map of the Montreal–Senneterre and its sister train, the Montreal–Jonquière

Overview
- Service type: Regional rail
- Status: Operating
- Locale: Quebec, Canada
- Predecessor: Abitibi
- Current operator: Via Rail
- Former operator: Canadian National Railway
- Ridership: 186 per week (2019)
- Annual ridership: 10,388 (2019)

Route
- Termini: Montreal, Quebec; Senneterre, Quebec
- Distance travelled: 717 km (446 mi)
- Average journey time: 13 hours and 32 minutes (to Senneterre), 13 hours and 18 minutes (to Montreal)
- Service frequency: 3 trains per week
- Train number: 603, 604, 606

On-board services
- Class: Economy
- Seating arrangements: No Reserved Economy seating

Technical
- Track gauge: 1,435 mm (4 ft 8 1/2 in)
- Operating speed: 75 mph (121 km/h) (top)

The Montreal–Senneterre train (formerly called the Abitibi) is a passenger train operated by Via Rail between Montreal and Senneterre, in the Abitibi-Témiscamingue region of Quebec, Canada.

The journey from end to end takes approximately 13.5 hours. Many small hunting and fishing clubs operate along the route and appear as request stops in the timetable. It is also possible to make a reservation to get off at an unmarked spot.

The train travels three times a week. Between Montreal and Hervey-Jonction, it travels on the same line as the Montreal–Jonquière train, another regional route.

== Route ==
The main stops of the Montreal–Senneterre train are:

- Montreal (Central Station)
- Joliette (Station)
- Shawinigan (Station)
- Hervey-Jonction (Station; connection to Montreal–Jonquière train)
- La Tuque (Station)
- Fitzpatrick
- Parent
- Clova
- Senneterre (Station)
