= Jonquière station =

Railway station in Quebec, Canada

Jonquière
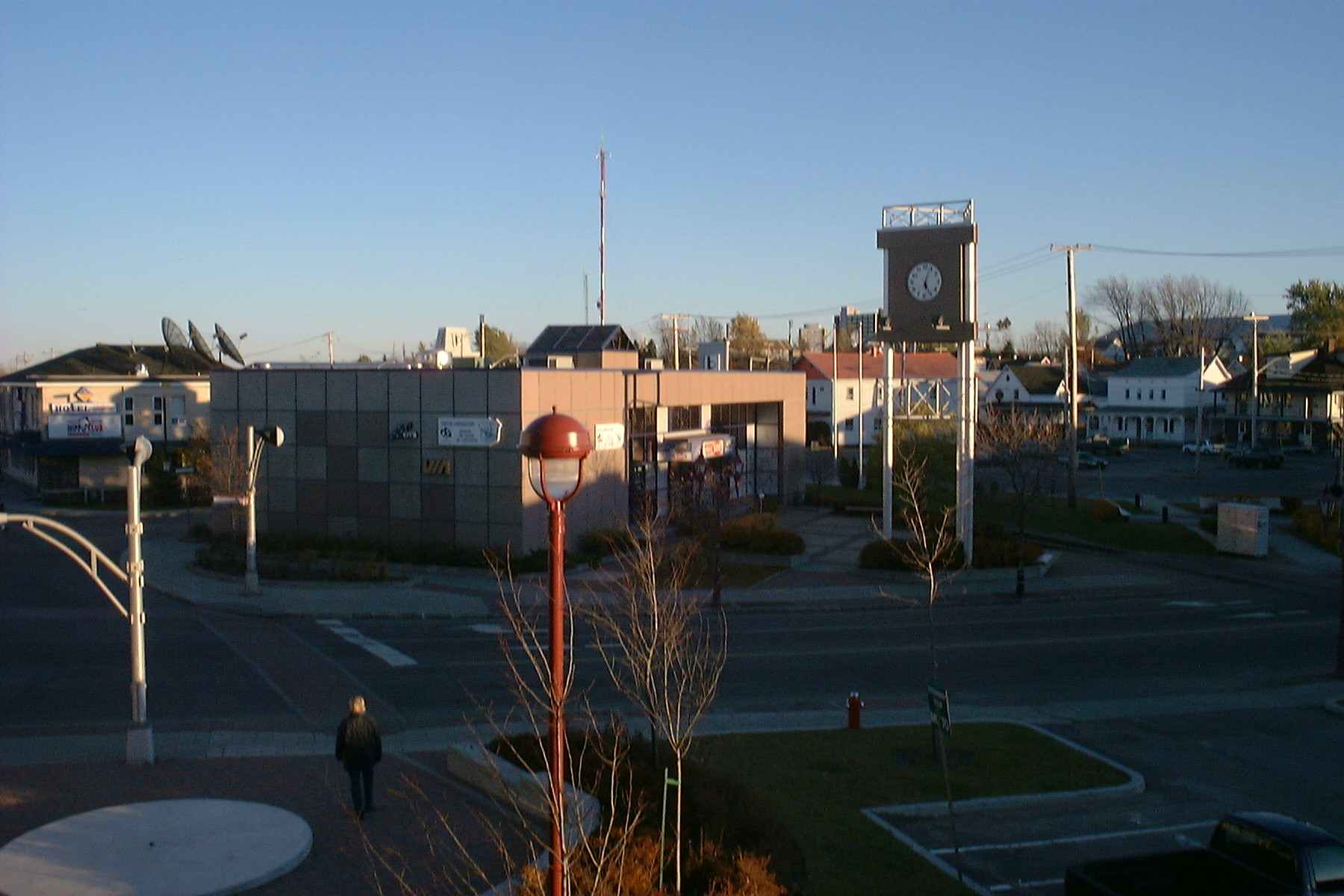

General information
- Location: 2439, rue Saint-Dominique; Saguenay, Quebec; G7X 6K9
- Coordinates: 48.4121°N 71.2544°W
- Platforms: 1 side platform
- Tracks: 1
- Connections: Société de transport du Saguenay

Construction
- Structure type: Staffed station

Services
Preceding station	Via Rail	Following station
Terminus	Montreal–Jonquière	Hébertville toward Montreal
Former services
Preceding station	Canadian National Railway	Following station
La Ratiere toward Quebec	Quebec – Chicoutimi	Arvida toward Chicoutimi
Location

Jonquière station is a Via Rail station in Saguenay, Quebec, Canada. It is located on rue Saint-Dominique in the former city of Jonquière. It is the final stop of Via Rail's Montreal–Jonquière train. The station is staffed and is wheelchair-accessible.
