= Senneterre station =

Railway station in Quebec, Canada

Senneterre
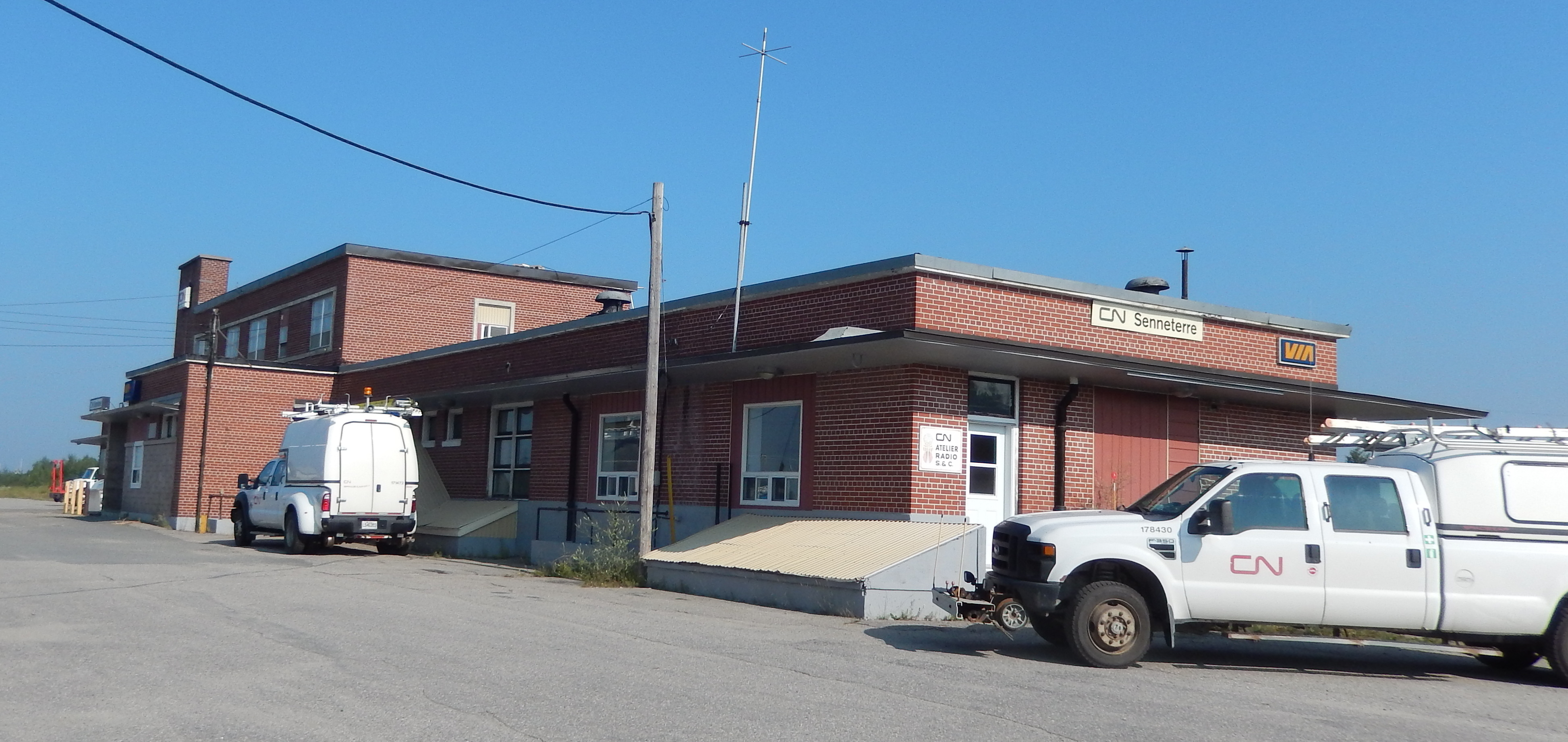

General information
- Location: 171, 4ème rue ouest, Senneterre; Quebec; Canada
- Coordinates: 48.3922°N 77.2442°W
- Platforms: 1
- Tracks: 1
- Train operators: Via Rail

Construction
- Structure type: Staffed station

Other information
- Website: Senneterre train station

History
- Opened: 29 April 1914

Services
Preceding station	Via Rail	Following station
Terminus	Montreal–Senneterre	Mégiscane toward Montreal
Former services
Preceding station	Canadian National Railway	Following station
Tiblemont toward Cochrane	Cochrane – Quebec	Phipps toward Quebec
Location
- Location within Quebec Location within Canada

Senneterre station is a Via Rail station in Senneterre, Quebec, Canada. It is the final stopover of Via Rail's Montreal–Senneterre train. The station is staffed and is wheelchair-accessible.
