= Montreal–Jonquière train =

Passenger train service between Montreal and Saguenay, Quebec

- Combined map of the Montreal–Jonquière and its sister train, the Montreal–Senneterre

Overview
- Service type: Regional rail
- Status: Operating
- Locale: Quebec, Canada
- Predecessor: Saguenay
- Current operator: Via Rail
- Former operator: Canadian National Railway
- Ridership: 208 per week (2019)
- Annual ridership: 10,985 (2019)

Route
- Termini: Montreal, Quebec; Jonquière, Quebec
- Distance travelled: 510 km (320 mi)
- Average journey time: 10 hours and 48 minutes to Montreal, 11 hours and 22 minutes to Jonquière
- Service frequency: 3 trains per week
- Train number: 600, 601, 602

On-board services
- Class: Economy
- Seating arrangements: No Reserved Economy seating

Technical
- Rolling stock: GMD F40PH-2D; Budd stainless steel cars
- Track gauge: 1,435 mm (4 ft 8 1/2 in)
- Operating speed: 75 mph (121 km/h) (top)

The Montreal–Jonquière train (formerly the Saguenay) is a passenger train operated by Via Rail between Montreal and Saguenay (borough of Jonquière) in Quebec, Canada. The train once operated as far as Chicoutimi.

Many small hunting and fishing clubs operate along the route and appear as optional stops on the timetable. It is also possible to make a reservation to get off at an unmarked spot.

The train travels three times a week. Between Montreal and Hervey-Jonction, it travels together with the Montreal–Senneterre, another regional train.

== Route ==
The main stops of Montreal–Jonquière train are:

- Montreal (Central Station)
- Joliette
- Shawinigan
- Hervey-Jonction (connection to the Montreal–Senneterre train)
- Rivière-à-Pierre
- Lac-Édouard
- Chambord
- Hébertville-Station (near Alma)
- Jonquière (in Saguenay)
