= Cameron Highlanders of Ottawa (Duke of Edinburgh's Own) =

Canadian Army Primary Reserve infantry regiment

Coordinates: 45.421397°N 75.688822°W

The Cameron Highlanders of Ottawa (Duke of Edinburgh's Own)
- Regimental badge
- Active: 1866–1875; 1881–present
- Country: Canada
- Branch: Canadian Army
- Type: Infantry
- Role: Light infantry
- Size: 300 (battalion)
- Part of: 33 Canadian Brigade Group
- Garrison/HQ: Ottawa
- Nickname: Camerons
- Motto: Advance
- March: "The March of the Cameron Men" and "Piobearached o' Donald Dubh"
- Engagements: Fenian Raids; North-West Rebellion; Low Rebellion; Second Boer War; First World War; Second World War; War in Afghanistan
- Battle honours: See #Battle honours
- Website: www.canada.ca/en/army/corporate/4-canadian-division/the-cameron-highlanders-of-ottawa.html

Commanders
- Current commander: Lieutenant-Colonel Ryan Hendy, CD
- Regimental Sergeant Major: Chief Warrant Officer Mark Gray, CD
- Honorary Colonel of the Regiment: Honorary Colonel Dan MacKay, CD
- Honorary Lieutenant-Colonel of the Regiment: Hon Lieutenant-Colonel Barbara Farber

Insignia
- Tartan: Cameron of Erracht

The Cameron Highlanders of Ottawa (Duke of Edinburgh's Own) is a Canadian Army Primary Reserve infantry regiment.

== Regimental badge ==
The regimental badge is laid out as follows: within a wreath of thistles and maple leaves, the figure of St Andrew with cross is shown standing on a mount charged with a plaque inscribed ADVANCE. On the lower bend of the wreath there are two rolls, the upper inscribed THE CAMERON HIGHLANDERS the lower OF OTTAWA (M.G.).

== Lineage ==
=== The Cameron Highlanders of Ottawa ===
- Originated on 5 August 1881, in Ottawa, Ontario, as the 43rd Battalion of Infantry
- Redesignated on 19 August 1881, as the 43rd Ottawa and Carleton Battalion of Rifles
- Redesignated on 8 May 1900, as the 43rd Regiment Ottawa and Carleton Rifles
- Redesignated on 1 March 1902 as the 43rd Regiment, Duke of Cornwall's Own Rifles
- Redesignated on 12 March 1920, as The Ottawa Regiment (The Duke of Cornwall's Own)
- Redesignated on 15 September 1922, as The Ottawa Highlanders
- Redesignated on 10 August 1933, as The Cameron Highlanders of Ottawa
- Amalgamated on 15 December 1936, with B Company of the 4th Machine Gun Battalion, CMGC and Redesignated as The Cameron Highlanders of Ottawa (Machine Gun)
- Redesignated on 7 November 1940, as the 2nd (Reserve) Battalion, The Cameron Highlanders of Ottawa (Machine Gun)
- Redesignated on 1 April 1942, as the 2nd (Reserve) Battalion, The Cameron Highlanders of Ottawa
- Redesignated on 18 May 1946, as The Cameron Highlanders of Ottawa
- Redesignated on 1 September 1954, as The Cameron Highlanders of Ottawa (Machine Gun)
- Redesignated on 1 August 1959, as The Cameron Highlanders of Ottawa

=== Lineage chart ===
Lineage chart

1856	Independent infy and rifle coys
1881	43rd Bn of Infy
1881	43rd "Ottawa and Carleton" Bn of Rifles
1900	43rd Regt "Ottawa and Carleton Rifles"
1902	43rd Regt, Duke of Cornwall's Own Rifles
1914	38th Bn, CEF
1916	207th “Overseas” Bn, CEF
1917	Absorbed by 7th Reserve Bn
1920	Disbanded	1st Bn (38th Bn, CEF), The Ottawa Regt (The Duke of Cornwall's Own)	2nd Bn (207th Bn, CEF), (Note: Reserve) The Ottawa Regt (The Duke of Cornwall's Own)
1922	1st Bn (38th Bn, CEF), The Ottawa Highlanders	2nd Bn (207th Bn, CEF), The Ottawa Highlanders
1933	1st Bn (38th Bn, CEF), The Cameron Highlanders of Ottawa	2nd Bn (207th Bn, CEF), The Cameron Highlanders of Ottawa
B Coy, 4th MG Bn, CMGC
1936	The Cameron Highlanders of Ottawa (MG)	Disbanded
1939	The Cameron Highlanders of Ottawa (MG), CASF
1940	1st Bn, The Cameron Highlanders of Ottawa (MG), CASF	2nd (Reserve) Bn, The Cameron Highlanders of Ottawa (MG)
1942	2nd (Reserve) Bn, The Cameron Highlanders of Ottawa
1943	3rd Infy Div. Support Bn (The Cameron Highlanders of Ottawa), CIC, CASF
1944	1st Bn, The Cameron Highlanders of Ottawa (MG), CIC, CASF
1945	Disbanded	3rd Bn, The Cameron Highlanders of Ottawa (MG), CIC, CAOF
1946	The Cameron Highlanders of Ottawa	Disbanded
1954	The Cameron Highlanders of Ottawa (MG)
1959	The Cameron Highlanders of Ottawa
2013	The Cameron Highlanders of Ottawa (Duke of Edinburgh's Own)

== Perpetuations ==
- 38th Battalion (Ottawa), CEF
- 207th (Ottawa-Carleton) Battalion, CEF

== History ==
=== Early years ===
The 1st Volunteer Militia Rifle Company of Ottawa was formed on April 3, 1856. At that time, the bulk of Canada's militia existed as small, independent companies scattered throughout the provinces. In 1866, the 43rd Battalion of Infantry (otherwise known as the Carleton Blazers) was formed in Bells Corners (now part of Ottawa) with companies in many of the surrounding communities and absorbed Ottawa's volunteer rifle company. This company is perpetuated to this day as "A" Company of The Cameron Highlanders of Ottawa.

=== Defence of Canada ===
The 43rd Battalion's first call to service came in 1870 when they were deployed to the Prescott area to defend Canada against Fenian raids. They saw no action there and quickly returned to Ottawa. Because they were so spread out, maintaining troop strength was difficult and in 1875, the regiment was disbanded.

In 1881, the unit was stood up again but this time as the 43rd "Ottawa and Carleton" Battalion of Rifles with the Ottawa volunteer rifle company and a number of other companies in communities on the Ontario and Quebec sides of the Ottawa River. No 2 Company, 43rd "Ottawa and Carleton" Battalion of Rifles, which was garrisoned in Hull is currently perpetuated by Le Régiment de Hull.

=== Boer War ===
Over the next 20 years, the 43rd's soldiers would see action in the North-West (Riel) Rebellion and in the Second Boer War. However, the battalion sent only volunteers to participate in these conflicts and never deployed formed units. They deployed against civil disturbances as well, such as the Low Rebellion.

During the Boer War, Private Richard Rowland Thompson, from Ottawa, was awarded the Queen's Scarf, a scarf crocheted by Queen Victoria, for bravery and his actions saving wounded soldiers.

In 1902, the regiment so impressed the Duke of Cornwall (later King George V) that he became the Camerons' first honorary colonel and allowed the regiment to bear his name. The regiment was then known 43rd Regiment, Duke of Cornwall's Own Rifles.

=== World War I ===
1914, when the First World War began, the unit was mobilized for action. However, once again, the unit did not go overseas as a formed unit. Instead, the unit was used to recruit and train soldiers mostly for the 2nd, 38th, and 207th battalions of the Canadian Expeditionary Force. The Camerons perpetuate the 38th and 207th battalions. The 38th saw action in France from 1916 to 1918 and received many battle honours. The members who served were also well decorated. The 207th left in June 1917 for France and were used as a reserve force for many units.

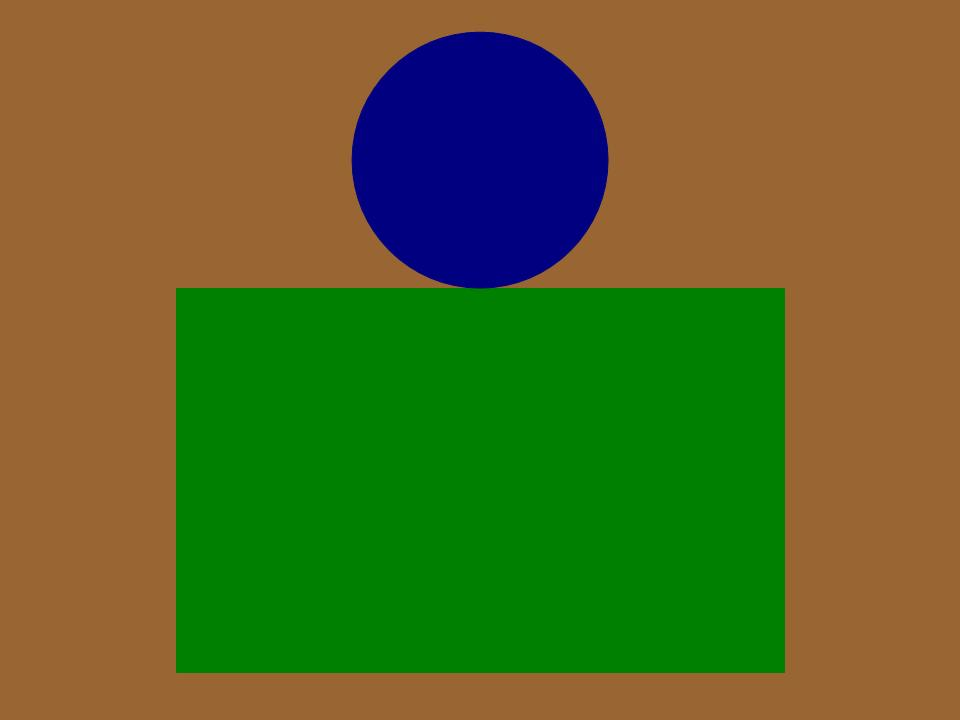
Battle patch of the 38th Battalion, CEF

=== Interwar ===
During the interwar years, the 43rd Regiment was reorganized and renamed on several occasions. In March 1920, it was converted from line infantry to a highland regiment and renamed The Ottawa Regiment (The Duke of Cornwall's Own). The regiment was allocated two battalions, the 1st Battalion (38th Battalion, CEF) and the 2nd Battalion (207th Battalion, CEF) (the 2nd Battalion existed only on paper), as a means of retaining the history and honours of the wartime Canadian Expeditionary Force battalions. In 1922, the 43rd Regiment was renamed The Ottawa Highlanders and, in 1933, it was renamed The Cameron Highlanders of Ottawa. "(M.G.)" (for machine gun) was added to the regimental title in 1936. Since 1881, the unit has shared the City of Ottawa's motto, Advance.

The Cameron Highlanders supported its then-colonel-in-chief and the king of Canada, George VI, and his wife, Queen Elizabeth, during their royal tour of the country in 1939, including during the unveiling of the National War Memorial, and received, in recognition, the King's and regimental colours on Parliament Hill in October of that year.

=== World War II ===
July 1940, the Cameron Highlanders of Ottawa's active service battalion left for garrison duty in Iceland, which ended in April 1941 when they sailed to England. On 6 June 1944, the Camerons were the only Ottawa unit to land on D-Day at Juno Beach. The 1st Battalion consisted of three machine gun companies and one mortar company. Following the landing on D-Day, the battalion fought in almost every battle in the northwestern Europe campaign. However, the battalion's soldiers were often attached as platoons and companies in support of other units, so the battalion never fought as an entire entity. During this time, the 2nd Battalion recruited and trained soldiers in Canada for overseas duty. The 3rd Battalion was formed in July 1945 as a part of the Canadian Army Occupation Force in Germany.

=== Modern conflicts (NATO and United Nations missions) ===
Since the Second World War, the regiment has remained in Ottawa. It is now a light infantry regiment.

Since 1985, the regiment's soldiers have served as deployed members on NATO and United Nations missions across the world and as members of Canadian Forces peacekeeping operations in Bosnia, Kosovo, The Congo, Cyprus, Israel, Somalia, and Syria, among other deployments.

During the deployment of a Canadian troops to Afghanistan, a number of Camerons served as reserve augmentees to the regular force as part of the NATO ISAF force. Camerons served in nearly every element of the task force with an infantry presence. They were involved in a full spectrum of operations, from the intense close combat of Operation Medusa in September 2006 and mentoring and training the Afghan National Army, to less conventional infantry tasks including civil-military cooperation, psychological operations, escort of logistical convoys, and force-protection duties at ISAF installations. The regiment continues to actively encourage members to volunteer for operational deployments, resulting in more Camerons serving overseas in recent years than in any period since the Second World War.

In August 2013, the Cameron Highlanders of Ottawa were granted the secondary title of Duke of Edinburgh's Own after its colonel-in-chief. Prince Philip, Duke of Edinburgh, was colonel-in-chief from 1967 until his death in 2021.

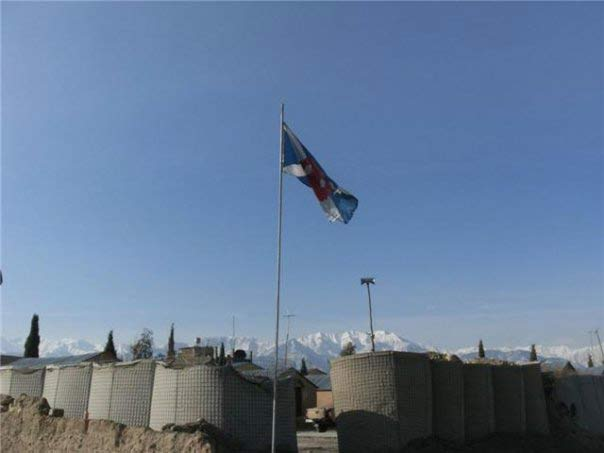
The regimental flag of the Cameron Highlanders of Ottawa flies above a NATO installation near Tora Bora in Afghanistan

== Regimental identity ==
The 43rd Ottawa and Carleton Battalion of Rifles was first permitted to adopt the motto "Advance" and to bear the same upon its appointments in accordance with General Order 82 dated 13 January 1882. This motto has been continued by all successors to the 43rd, including the regiment today. It is also the motto of the City of Ottawa. The Camerons are proudly known as Ottawa's regiment, and they hold the freedom of the city of Ottawa.

A new recruit to the regiment is given their Balmoral bonnet headdress and their Camerons cap badge upon completion of their Soldier Qualification course. Following the completion of their DP1 Infantry course, they are given the blue hackle that sits between the tartan patch and the cap badge, and extends out the top of the badge.

As a Highland regiment, the dress uniform of the Camerons is very similar to other Canadian-Scottish regiments. The Camerons wear traditional Scottish kilts patterned off of the Queen's Own Cameron Highlanders' Cameron of Erracht. The green Canadian Forces jacket is cut in a manner that the skirts curve outwards and downwards above where a belt buckle would rest. In addition to the kilt, the soldiers of the Camerons wear a leather sporran, and oxford shoes and Lovat hose with red garter flashes in lieu of ankle boots. Higher orders of dress include white spats, a white sporran (hair sporran for officers and senior NCOs), and a white belt. The regiment also possesses traditional scarlet doublets and feather bonnets that are worn for ceremonial purpose such as guard formations and the annual Remembrance Day parade.

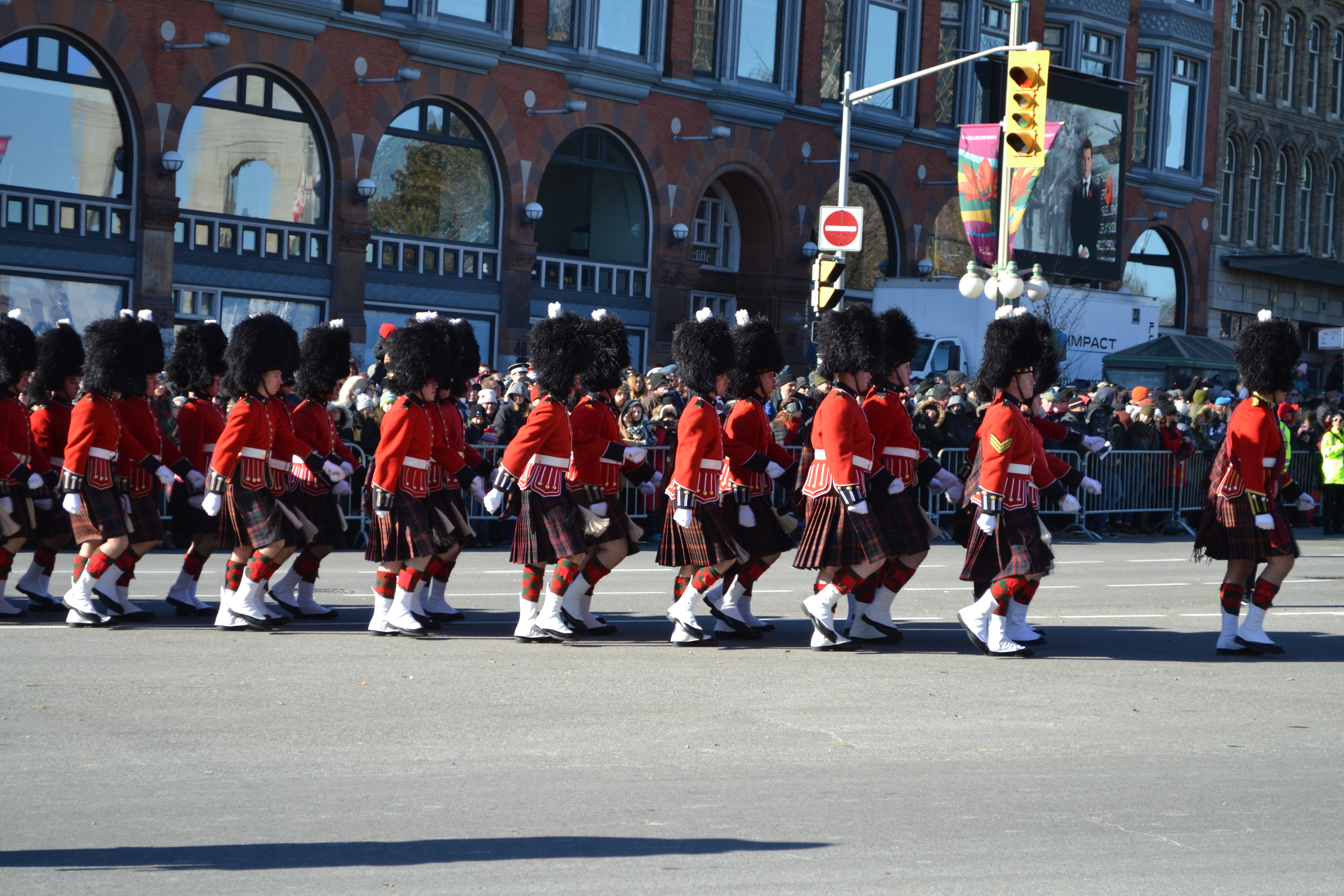
The regiment during a Remembrance Day parade in Ottawa.

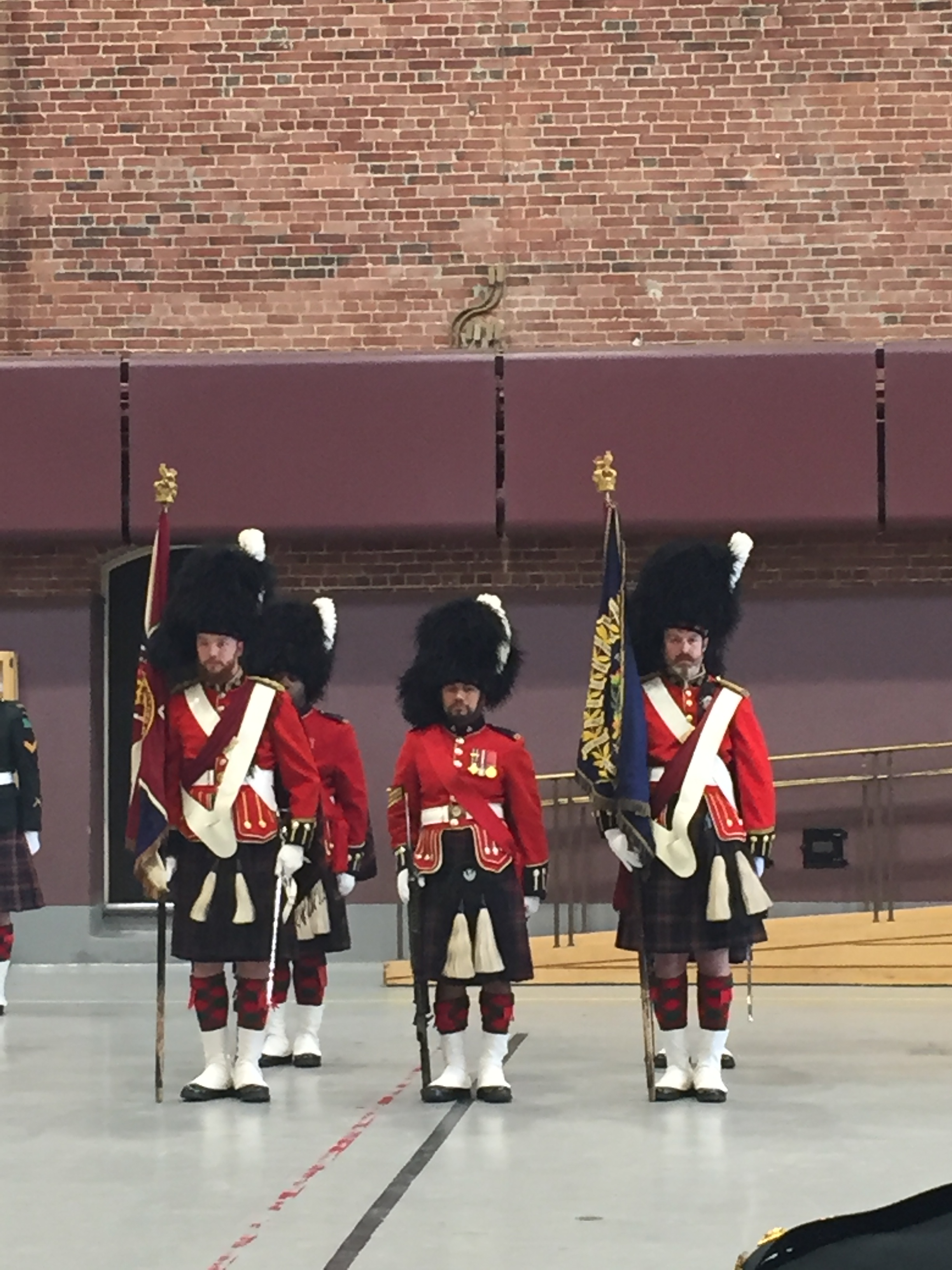
The Colour Party with Lt Busby, Sgt Rivera and 2Lt Fortner shown, participate in the Change of Command Parade on 7 September 2019

== Regimental structure ==
The regiment is composed of 265 officer and non-commissioned members. The regimental structure is as follows:

- Headquarters and Service Company (based out of Cartier Square Drill Hall)
  - Regimental Headquarters
  - Company Headquarters
  - Regimental Operations cell
  - Battalion Orderly Room
  - Regimental Quartermaster Stores
  - Pipes and Drums
- A Company (based out of Cartier Square Drill Hall)
  - Composed of:
    - Company Headquarters
    - 4 Rifle Platoons
    - Company Weapons Det
- B Company (based out of Lynwood Mall, Bells Corners)
  - Composed of:
    - Company Headquarters
    - Training Cadre that focus on
      - Preparatory training for the Infantry Junior Leadership Course
      - Preparatory training for the Infantry Platoon Commander Course
      - Basic Military Qualification Course
- 33 Influence Activities Company (based out of Cartier Square Drill Hall)
  - The Influence Activities Company mission is to promote, enable, and synchronize Influence Activities (IA) capabilities in support of the Canadian Armed Forces (CAF) across the full spectrum of operations. The IA Coy trains for capability development and for the preparation of personnel in both Civil-Military Cooperation (CIMIC) and Psychological Operation (PSYOPS) training. It also ensures the presence of an operationally viable and relevant influence capability while ensuring that its personnel are ready to support CAF deployments at any time and in and anywhere.
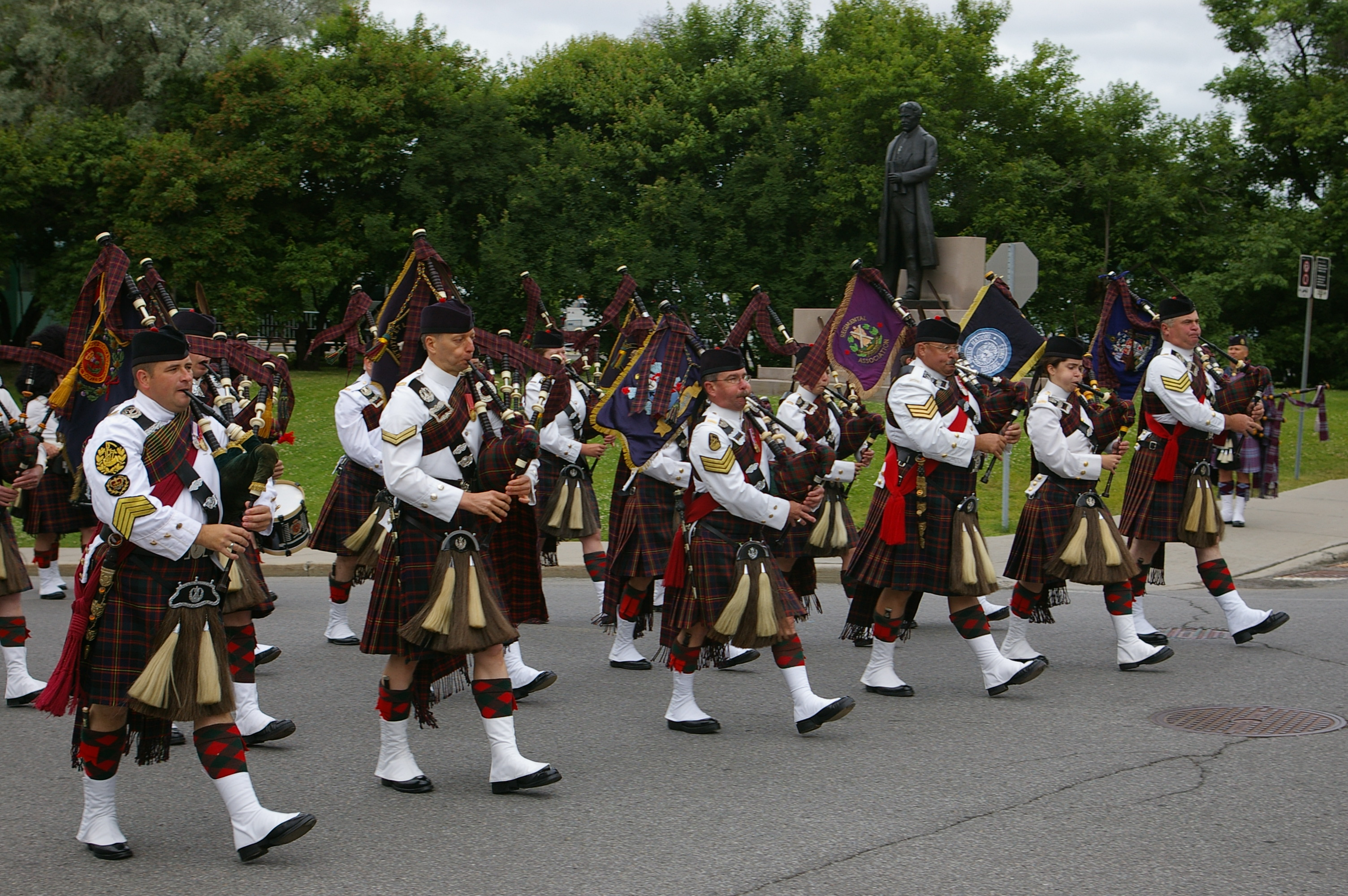
The pipe band during a Canada Day procession in 2007.

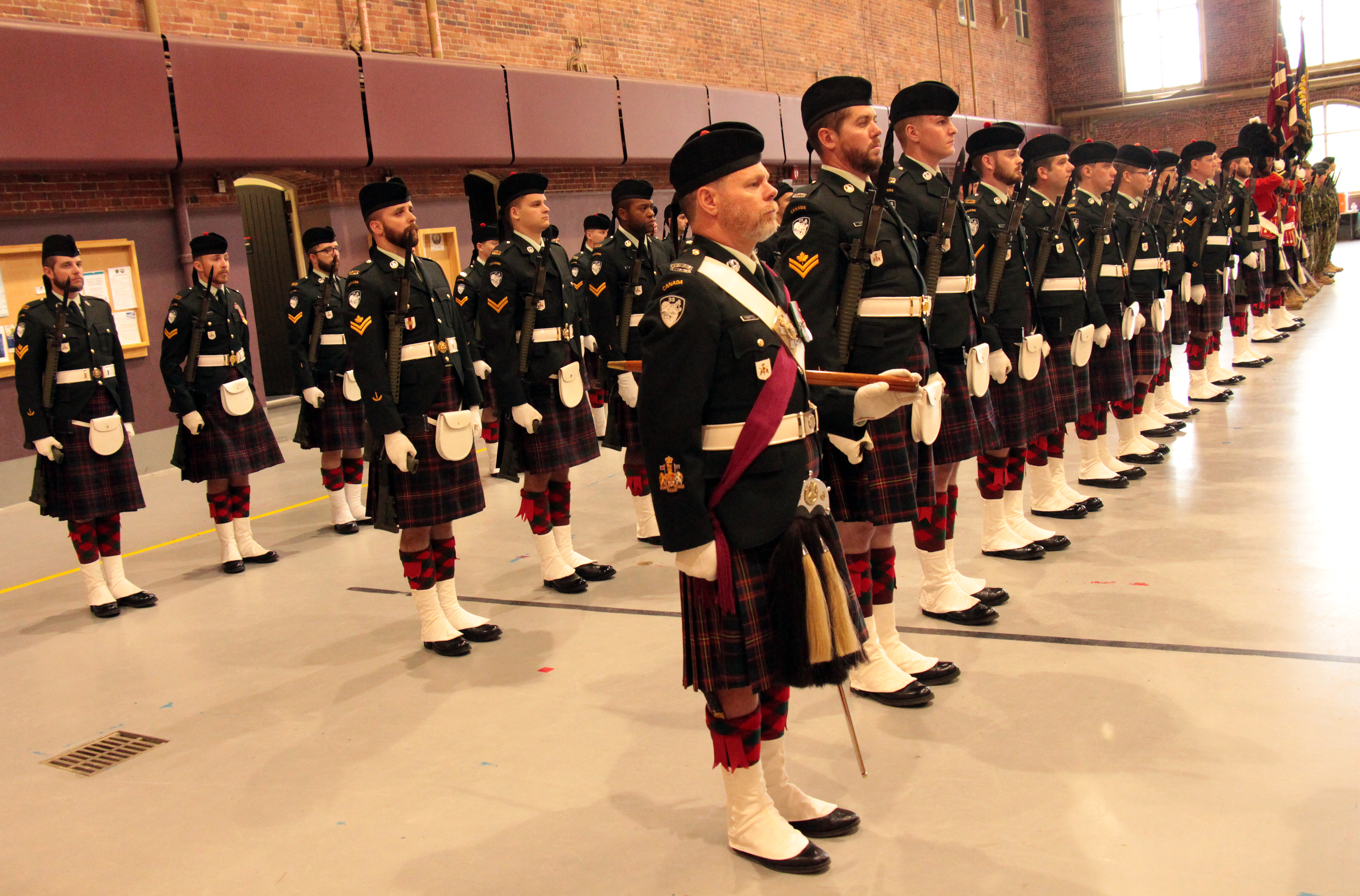
Change of Command Parade 7 September 2019 with Regimental Sergeant-Major, Chief Warrant Officer Drummond Robertson along with No 1 Guard.

== Training ==
The Regiment's main effort is to recruit, train and prepare Infantry soldiers to deploy on operations, both domestically and abroad. To accomplish this, the Regiment conducts training every Thursday night from September through to June each year. Training consists of basic soldier skills, individual battle task standards, and more advanced training operations based on contemporary training doctrine focused on infantry small unit tactics at the Section (8 person) and Platoon (34 people) levels. The intent is to developing standard operating procedures and work up training to prepare for the conduct of Field Training Exercises which are typically conducted at CFB Petawawa or nearby at the Connaught Ranges. Field Training Exercises are usually conducted once per month from September to June each year.

During the summer months, the regiment is stood down for training in order to allow soldiers to attend nationally organized and conducted training in order to obtain necessary skills and qualification to proceed in rank. These courses vary in length and are typically conducted at bases throughout the country, with the majority at CFB Meaford, CFB Petawawa and CFB Gagetown.

In 2019 the regiment was assigned the Reconnaissance Mission Task by the Commander Canadian Army. This task is intended to have the Regiment recruit, train and prepare an Infantry Close Reconnaissance Platoon ready to deploy on operations as part of 3 RCR.

== Domestic operations ==
Camerons have been extensively involved in Operations both domestically and abroad. At home Camerons were deployed as part of the relief efforts during the January 1998 North American ice storm. The Regiment was deployed to, and supported relief efforts in the town and vicinity of Maxville, Ontario.

The Regiment also supported flood relief efforts in the Ottawa-Gatineau area in 2017 (OPERATION LENTUS 17) and in Ottawa and Constance Bay area in 2019 (OPERATION LENTUS 2019).

== Regimental affiliations ==
The Highlanders, 4th Battalion, Royal Regiment of Scotland (4 SCOTS) is an infantry battalion of the Royal Regiment of Scotland. It perpetuates the lineage of the Queen's Own Cameron Highlanders, a former Scottish regiment of the British Army.

- United Kingdom – The Highlanders

== Battle honours ==
The regiment has been awarded 38 battle honours, of which 20 (denoted below in all caps) are emblazoned on the regimental colour.

South Africa
- SOUTH AFRICA 1899-1900
Great War
- Mount Sorrel
- SOMME 1916
- Ancre
- Ancre Heights
- ARRAS
  - 1917
  - 1918
- VIMY 1917
- YPRES, 1917
- PASSCHENDAELE
- AMIENS
- Scarpe 1918
- DROCQUORT-QUĖANT
- HINDENBURG LINE
- CANAL DU NORD
- VALENCIENNES
- Sambre
- France and Flanders, 1916–18
Second World War
- NORMANDY LANDING
- CAEN
- CARPIQUET
- The Orne
- BOURGUĖBUS RIDGE
- Faubourg de Vaucelles
- FALAISE
- Quesnay Wood
- The Laison
- BOULOGNE 1944
- THE SCHELDT
- Breskens Pocket
- The Rhineland
- Waal Flats
- THE HOCHWALD
- THE RHINE
- Zutphen
- Deventer
- Leer
- NORTH-WEST EUROPE 1944-1945
Afghanistan
- AFGHANISTAN

== Victoria Cross recipients ==
=== Claude Patrick Joseph Nunney ===
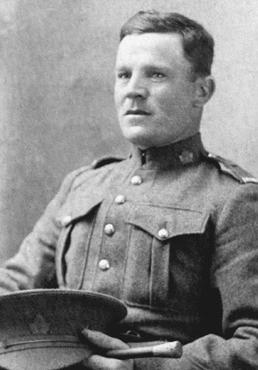
Claude Nunney

Claude Nunney was a member of the 38th (Ottawa) Battalion, Canadian Expeditionary Force which is perpetuated by the Cameron Highlanders of Ottawa. Nunney was a private in the First World War when the following deeds took place for which he was awarded the VC:

For most conspicuous bravery during the operations against the Drocourt-Quéant Line on Sept. 1st and 2nd, 1918.

On Sept. 1st, when his battalion was in the vicinity of Vis-en-Artois, preparatory to the advance, the enemy laid down a heavy barrage and counter-attacked. Pte. Nunney, who was at this time at company headquarters, immediately on his own initiative proceeded through the barrage to the company outpost lines, going from post to post and encouraging the men by his own fearless example. The enemy were repulsed and a critical situation was saved.

During the attack on Sept. 2nd, his dash continually placed him in advance of his companions, and his fearless example undoubtedly helped greatly to carry the company forward to its objectives. When his battalion which was preparing to advance, and was heavily counter-attacked by the enemy, Private Nunney on his own initiative, went forward through the barrage to the company out-post lines, going from post to post and encouraging the men by his own fearless example.

– London Gazette 13 December 1918

He died aged 25, 16 days after receiving what proved to be mortal wounds and was buried at Aubigny Communal Cemetery Extension, near Aubigny-en-Artois (Grave reference number IV. B. 39).

=== Thain Wendell MacDowell ===
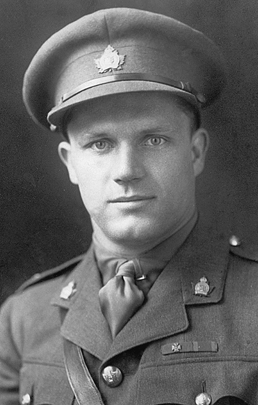
Thain MacDowell

Thain Wendell MacDowell was one of four soldiers to earn the Victoria Cross in the Battle of Vimy Ridge.

On 9 April 1917 at Vimy Ridge, France, Captain MacDowell, with the assistance of two runners (company orderlies, Pvts. James T. Kobus and Arthur James Hay, both of whom were awarded the DCM for their part) reached the German position ahead of his company. After destroying one machine-gun nest he chased the crew from another. MacDowell then spotted one German going into a tunnel. At the base of the tunnel, MacDowell was able to bluff the Germans to think he was part of a much larger force, resulting in the surrendering of two German officers and 75 German soldiers. He sent the prisoners up out the tunnel in groups of 12 so that Kebus and Hay could take them back to the Canadian line. Seeing that he had been fooled, a German prisoner grabbed a rifle and tried to shoot one of the runners. The German was then shot and killed.

Although wounded in the hand, MacDowell continued for five days to hold the position gained, in spite of heavy shellfire, until eventually relieved by his battalion. He was promoted to the rank of Major following his actions at Vimy Ridge.

== Freedoms ==
The regiment has received the freedom of the city of several locations throughout its history. These include:

- (Ontario) 24 May 1969: Ottawa.
- (France) 8 May 2019: Vis-en-Artois.

== Drill hall ==
Site	Date(s)	Designated	Location	Description	Image
Cartier Square Drill Hall	1879	Classified - 1985 Register of the Government of Canada Heritage Buildings	On the bank of the Rideau Canal, just south of Laurier Avenue W. Ottawa, Ontario	A large and centrally located building with low-pitched gable roof houses The Cameron Highlanders of Ottawa (Duke of Edinburgh's Own), the Governor General's Foot Guards and 2784 Governor General's Foot Guards Army Cadets	

== Museum ==
The Cameron Highlanders of Ottawa Museum
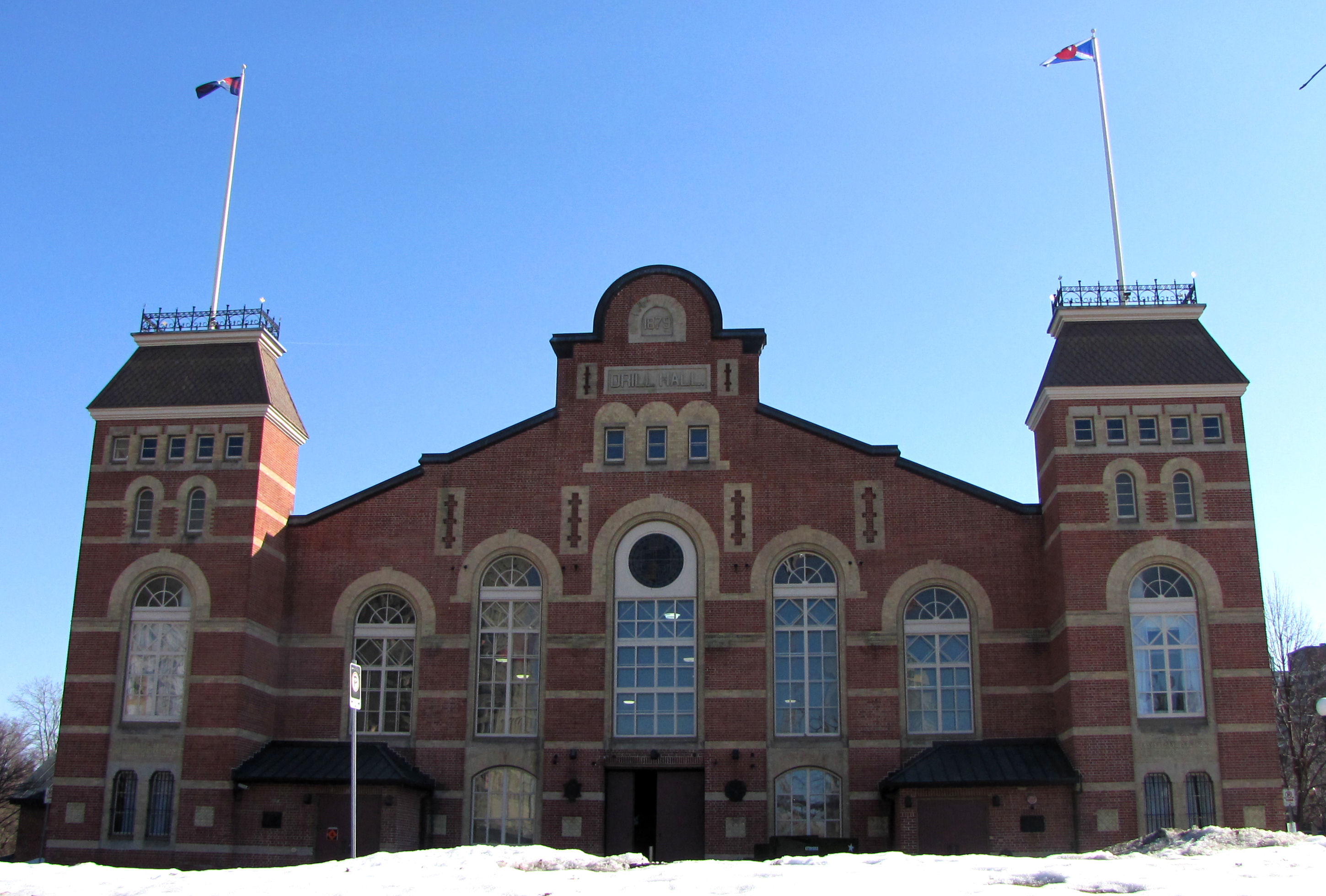
- Location: Cartier Square Drill Hall, Ottawa, ON K1A 0K2 Canada
- Type: Regimental Museum

The museum serves as a training medium to teach Regimental history. It preserves Regimental history through the collection of documents, pictures, books, military artifacts, etc., with particular emphasis on the histories of The Ottawa and Carleton Rifles, The Duke of Cornwall's Own Rifles, the 38th Battalion, CEF, 207th Battalion, CEF, The Ottawa Regiment and The Ottawa Highlanders. It provides research facilities for the study of Canadian military history dating from 1855 in so far as it affects The Cameron Highlanders of Ottawa and the regiments it perpetuates. The museum displays and illustrates in an appropriate manner the dress, weapons and customs of the Regiment's military heritage.

== Music ==
- Canada: Far & Away (audio CD) by Cameron Highlanders of Ottawa Pipes & Drums - Central Band of the Canadian Forces - Canadian Forces School of Music Band & Pipes - Air Command Band Canadian Forces - Stadacona Band of Maritime Forces Atlantic - Canadian Forces School of Music Band (Jul 21 2009)

== Media ==
- The History of the 1st Battalion Cameron Highlanders of Ottawa (MG) by Lieutenant-Colonel Richard M. Ross (1946)

== See also ==
- Canadian-Scottish regiment

== Order of precedence ==
Preceded by Le Régiment de Maisonneuve	The Cameron Highlanders of Ottawa (Duke of Edinburgh's Own)	Succeeded by The Royal Winnipeg Rifles
