= Cartier Square Drill Hall =

- Cartier Drill Hall in 2026

General information
- Type: Drill Hall / armoury
- Location: on the bank of the Rideau Canal just south of Laurier Avenue, Ottawa, Ontario, Canada
- Coordinates: 45°25′17″N 75°41′20″W
- Current tenants: The Governor General's Foot Guards and The Cameron Highlanders of Ottawa (Duke of Edinburgh's Own)
- Inaugurated: 1879
- Owner: Canadian Forces

Design and construction
- Architects: Thomas Seaton Scott, Dominion Architect
- Awards: Canada Heritage Buildings Classification - 1985

The Drill Hall at Cartier Square is a dedicated military training facility in Ottawa, Ontario, Canada. It has been a local landmark since its construction in 1879 expressly for the Governor General's Foot Guards, though other troops were later housed there also. The drill hall is 70 metres (230 ft) long and has two 43-metre-tall (141 ft) mansard towers.

The hall is located on the bank of the Rideau Canal just south of Laurier Avenue. The area to the west was once a large open field used for drilling, but today is the location of the Ottawa City Hall and courthouse.

== Architecture ==
The building was designed by Thomas Seaton Scott, first chief architect of the Dominion of Canada. The building is a rare surviving example of a military training facility built in the immediate post-confederation era when establishing a military presence and asserting the role of the federal government were important government aims.

Lieutenant Paul Weatherbee (1869–1925), who was appointed Chief Architect and Engineer from 1897 to 1905, was responsible for overseeing the design and construction of militia and defence buildings in Canada which were not designed by the Department of Public Works, for which Thomas Fuller, Chief Dominion Architect, was responsible. Weatherbee supervised and inspected militia buildings, and designed munitions stores buildings, often erected adjacent to drill halls. The largest of these works was located at the rear of the Cartier Square Drill Hall, measuring 150 by 70 feet (46 m × 21 m), and was used for the storage of weapons, uniforms, and ammunition.

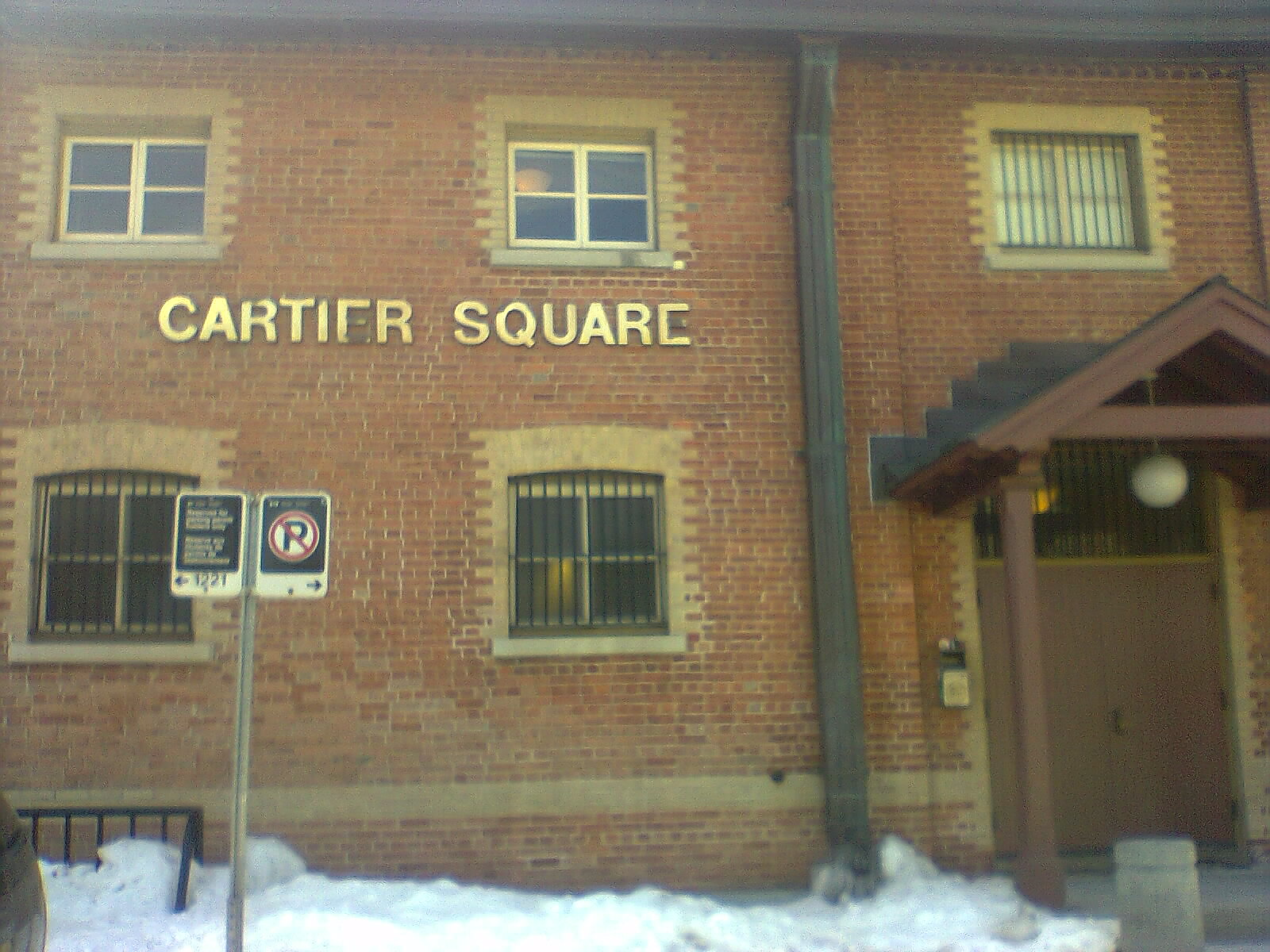
Cartier Square Drill Hall, side entrance

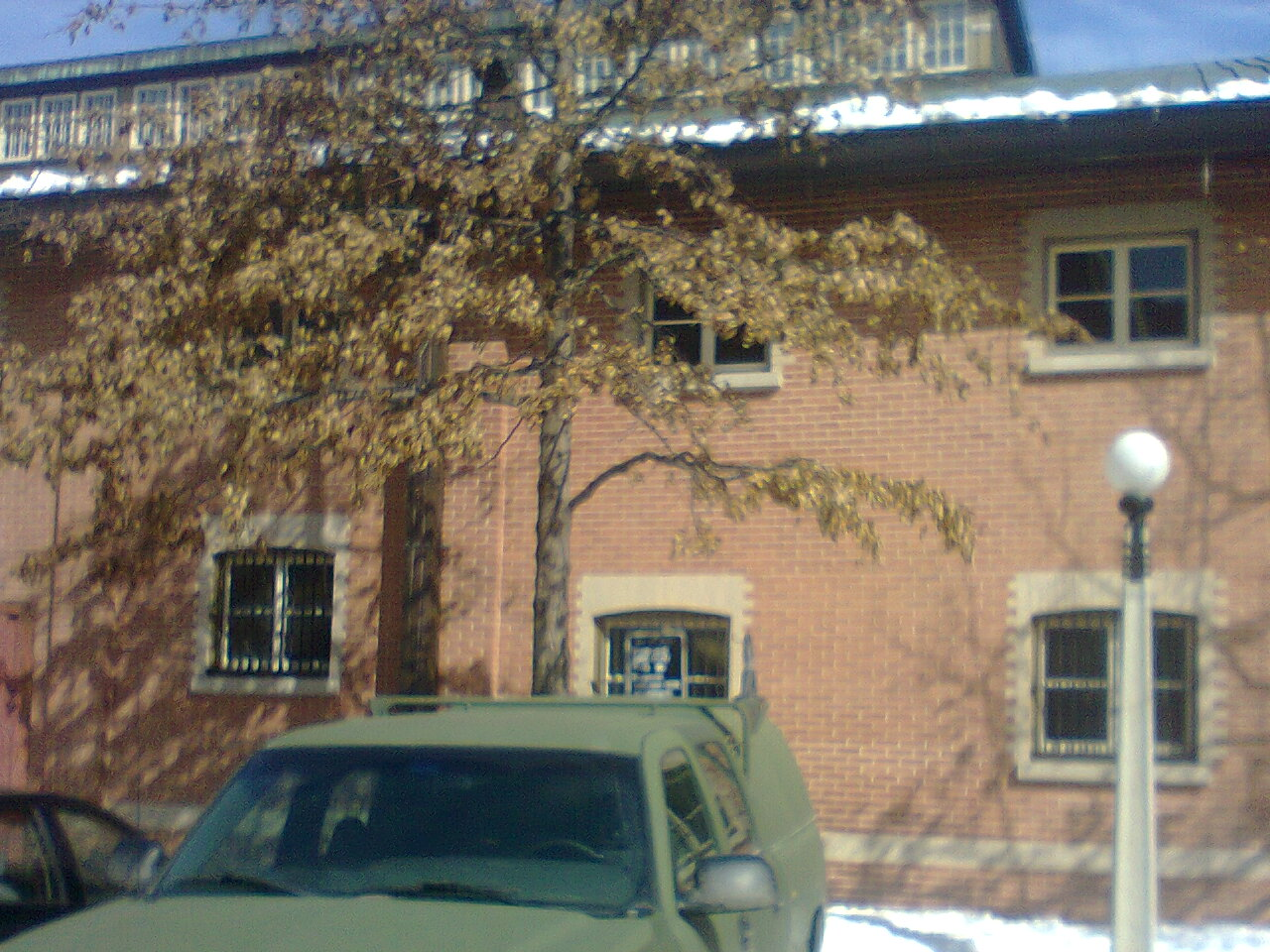
Cartier Square Drill Hall, sideview

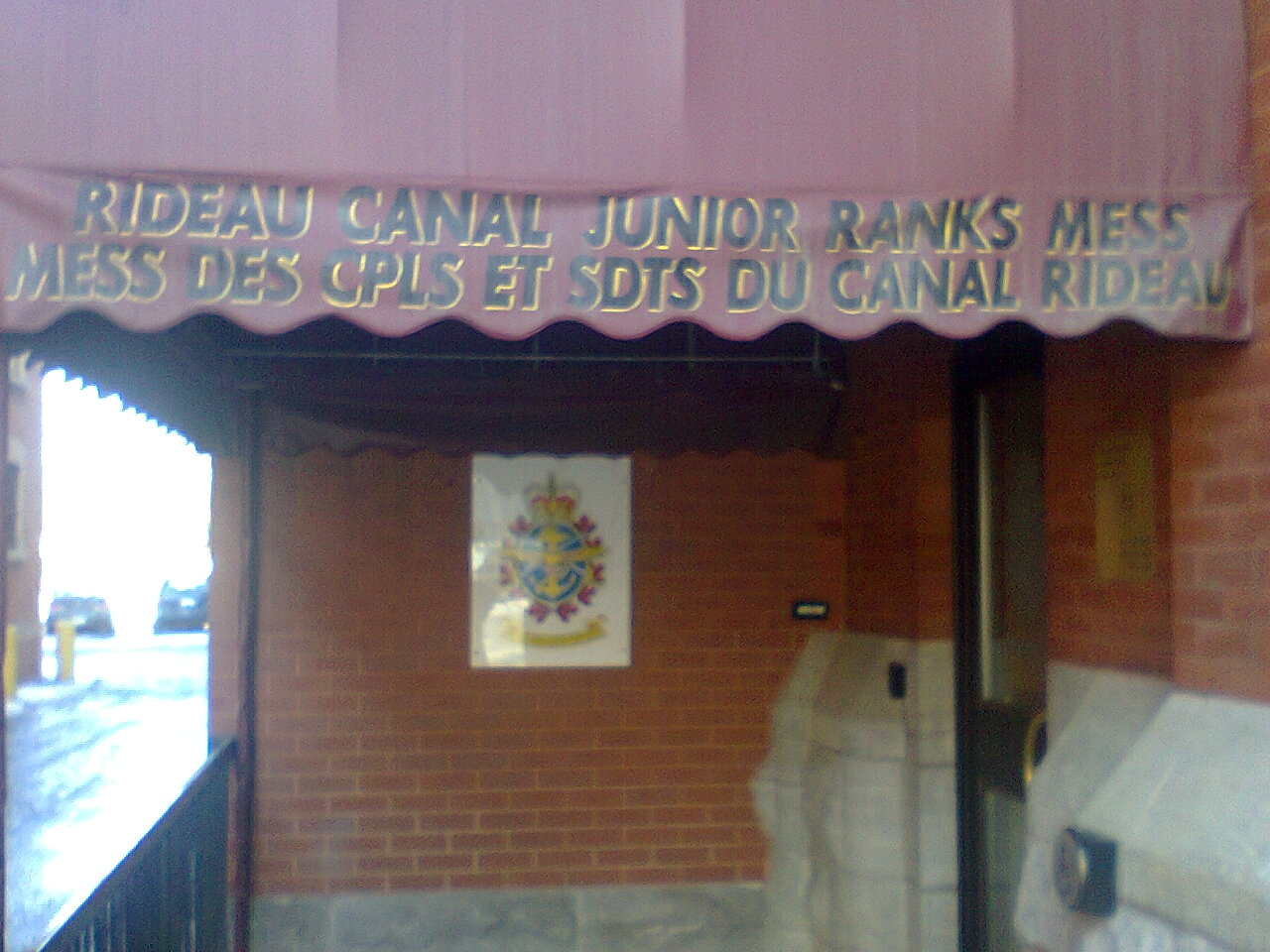
Rideau Canal Junior Ranks Mess behind Cartier Square Drill Hall

== Units ==
The building was specifically designed to house The Governor General's Foot Guards (GGFG). The 43rd Carleton Battalion of Infantry, disbanded in 1875, did not exist at the time. However once the unit was re-authorized in 1881 as the 43rd Battalion of Infantry, redesignated the 43rd Ottawa and Carleton Battalion of Rifles (today The Cameron Highlanders of Ottawa (Duke of Edinburgh's Own)), they began to use the Drill Hall in August 1881. The 43rd, with a larger establishment, had six companies dispersed across Hull, Metcalfe, Vernon, Fitzroy, Aylwin, Eardley, and Wakefield, and were not as concentrated at the Drill Hall as were the Guards, with four companies.

In the Canadian Forces, an armoury is a place where a reserve unit trains, meets, and parades. Today the Drill Hall remains home to the GGFG and The Cameron Highlanders of Ottawa (Duke of Edinburgh's Own). Both of these units are active components of Canada's Primary Reserve, providing trained volunteer soldiers to augment the Regular Army in peace and war. Each day during the summer months, it is from the Drill Hall that the Ceremonial Guard departs to initiate the Changing the Guard ceremony on Parliament Hill.

The 2784 Governor General's Foot Guards Army Cadets (RCAC), also parade at Cartier Square Drill Hall on Wednesday evenings from 6:00 PM to 9:00 PM.

RCSCC Falkland holds their annual review ceremony at Cartier Square Drill Hall.

== History ==
For over 125 years, the Drill Hall at Cartier Square has been at the centre of military mobilization and training for soldiers recruited from the Ottawa-Carleton area, overseeing soldiers deployed for service in:

- North West Canada, 1885
- South Africa, 1899–1902
- The Great War, 1914–1918
- The Second World War, 1939–1945
- Korean War, 1950–1953
- Several peacekeeping operations including Cyprus, Sierra Leone, and the former Yugoslavia.
- Afghanistan War, 2001–2014

During Ottawa Race Weekend each year, Cartier Square Drill Hall is converted into a satellite site of The Ottawa Hospital to provide medical services for runners.

== Sculpture ==
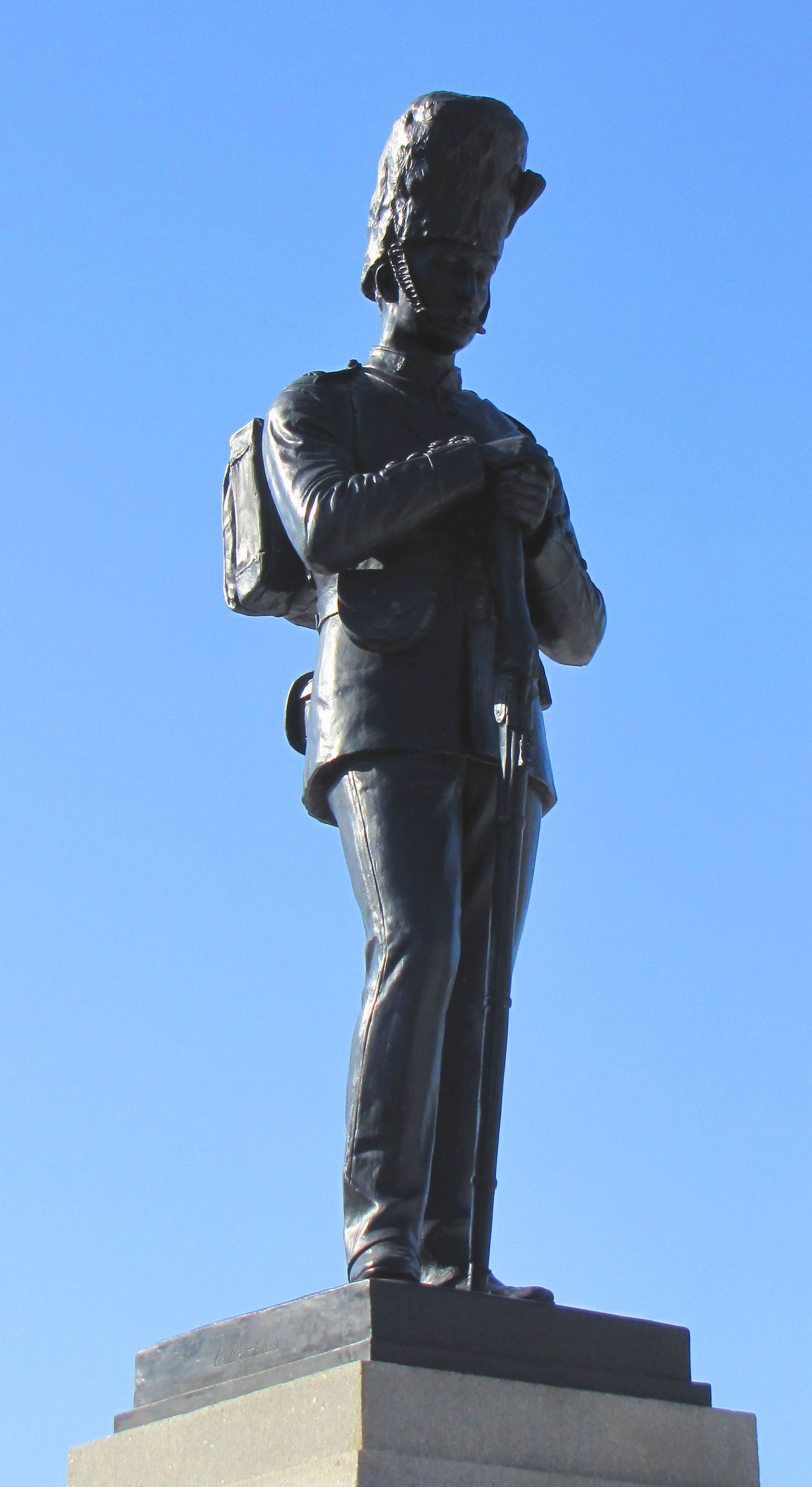
Statue to Wm. B. Osgoode and John Rogers who fell in action at Cutknife Hill, 2 May 1885

A statue dedicated to Privates William B. Osgoode and John Rogers, who were killed during the Battle of Cutknife Hill on 2 May 1885 during the North-West Rebellion, was moved to Cartier Square Drill Hall in 2006 from Confederation Park. Unveiled on May 2, 1887, a tablet is also dedicated to the memory of Privates J. Rogers and Wm. B. Osgoode.

=== Parade Square ===
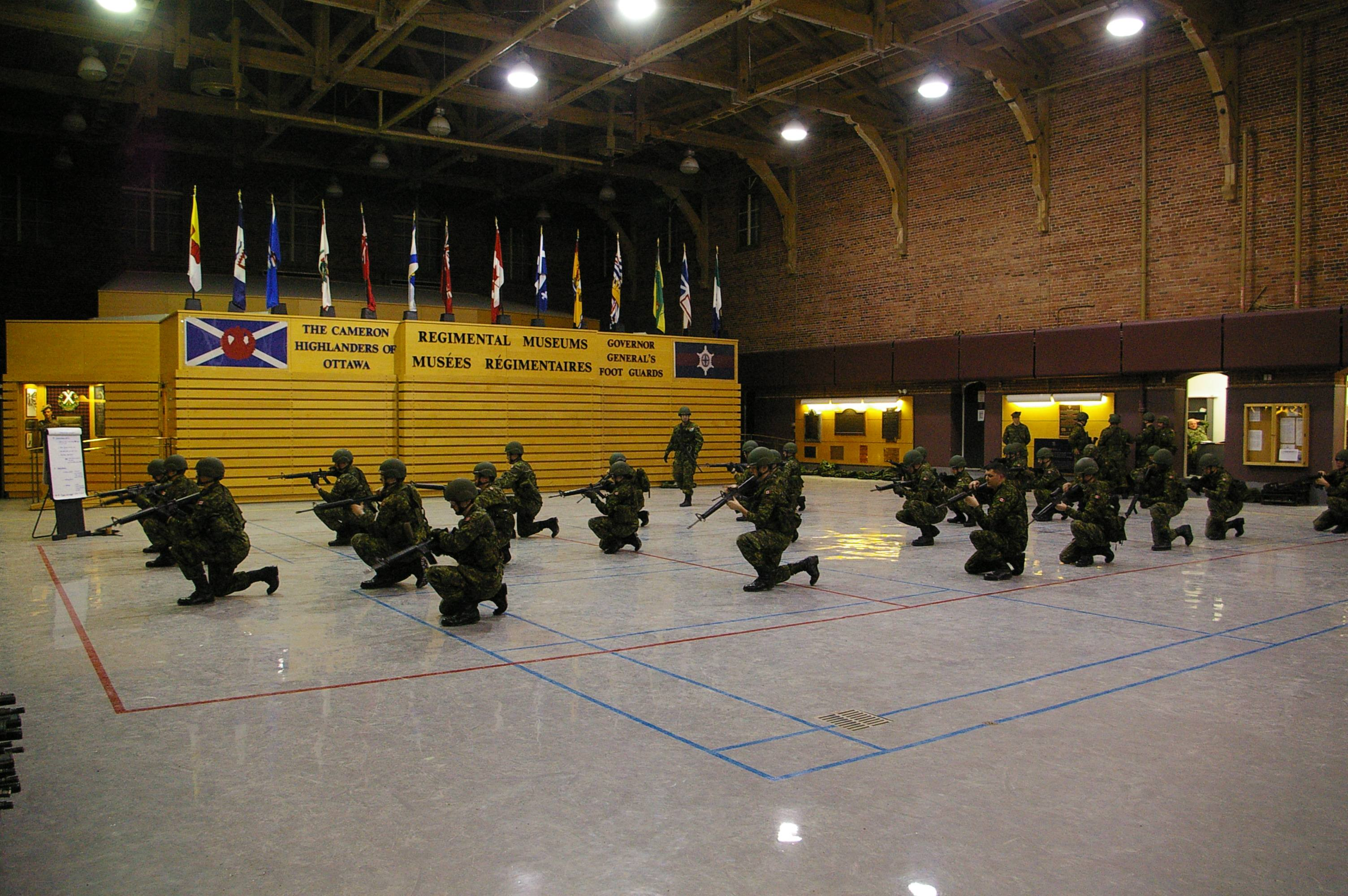
Soldiers of The Cameron Highlanders of Ottawa - Weapons training in Drill Hall

The Parade Square provides ample area for training at the section, platoon and company level and it is often loaned out to a wide variety of civilian organizations to hold large dinners and entertainment events such as the City of Ottawa Christmas Party, the Ottawa Heritage Ball, and the Ottawa Garrison Ball.

=== Officers' Mess ===
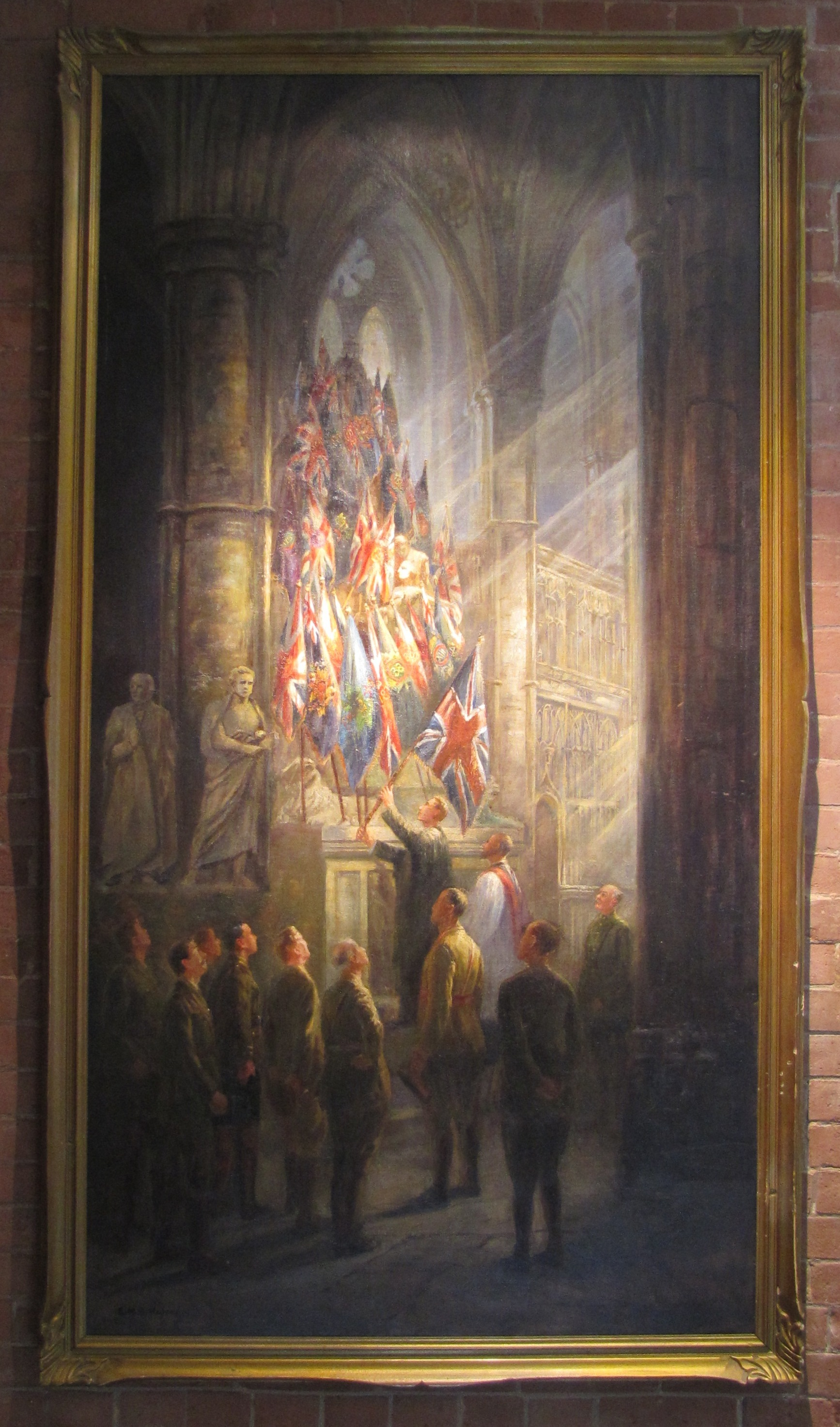
Photo of `Placing the Canadian Colours on Wolfe's Monument in Westminster Abbey` by Emily Warren c 1919 oil painting in Officer Mess, Cartier Square Drill Hall

The Officers' Mess is used by both the Governor General's Foot Guards and The Cameron Highlanders of Ottawa (Duke of Edinburgh's Own). Originally constructed in the 19th Century for the officers of the Foot Guards, the mess was the scene of Sir Sam Hughes' (the Minister of Militia and Defence at the time) declaration of war by Canada in 1914. In addition to an extensive art and regimental silver collection, the mess also houses the current Queen's and Regimental Colours of both regiments.

=== Plaques ===
==== Governor General's Foot Guards ====
- A tablet was dedicated to the memory of those Governor General's Foot Guards Officers, Non-Commissioned Officers and Guardsmen who gave their lives while serving with the regiment in the Second World War.
- "Forceful III", a Second-World War era Sherman tank, was dedicated to the memory Governor General's Foot Guards killed during the Second World War. Although the plaque remains, the tank was moved from the Cartier Square Drill Hall to the Canadian War Museum in 2006.

==== Cameron Highlanders ====
- A memorial tablet is dedicated to the members of the 43rd Regiment Ottawa and Carleton Rifles who served and died in the South Africa campaign 1899 - 1902.
- A plaque is dedicated to the memory of Sergt. Cuthbert T. Thomas, member of the Number 5 Company, the Governor General Foot Guards killed in action at Paardeberg, South Africa on 27 February 1900.
- Another plaque was dedicated to the officers, warrant officers, non-commissioned officers and Men who served with the Cameron highlanders of Ottawa during the Second World War.

==== Canadian Expeditionary Forces ====
- A plaque was dedicated to 5326 Officers and Men who served in the Canadian Expeditionary Force, 2nd Canadian Infantry Battalion, 1914–1918. A plaque honouring the 38th Ottawa Overseas Battalion Canadian Expeditionary Force commemorates the Sixtieth Annual Reunion of the 38th Battalion Association by the Cameron Highlanders of Ottawa Regimental Association on October 1, 1978.

==== Victoria Cross ====
- Unveiled on July 15, 1996, a plaque was dedicated to the memory of Filip Konowal, who was conferred the Victoria Cross in London on 15 October 1917.
- Unveiled in 2002, a plaque was dedicated to the memory of Captain Thain Wendell MacDowell and Private Claude Joseph Patrick Nunney, two members of the 38th Canadian Infantry Battalion, Canadian Expeditionary Force, who were awarded the Victoria Cross.

==== Cameron Highlanders ====
- Unveiled on June 6, 1998, a plaque is dedicated to the Cameron Highlanders in recognition as Ottawa's Regiment, and for over a century of service in peace, war and natural disasters.
- A plaque was dedicated to the memory of the members of the Cameron Highlanders of Ottawa who participated in the campaign of 1944-1945 that led to the liberation of the Netherlands.
- A plaque was dedicated to the memory of David G. Spinney, a Guardsman who died while training at Canadian Forces Base Petawawa on July 10, 1987.
- A plaque is dedicated to the memory of Staff Sergeant T.J. Benbow, who died while saving five others in the Webster Hotel fire in Montreal on October 30, 1899.

==== Princess Louise Dragoon Guards ====
- Unveiled on November 26, 1979, a plaque is dedicated to all who served with the 4th Princess Louise Dragoon Guards from 1872 to 1964. A memorial plaque is also dedicated to Officers, NCO's and Men who died while serving with the 4th Princess Louise Dragoon Guards during the Second World War.

== See also ==
- List of armouries in Canada
- Military history of Canada
- History of the Canadian Army
- Canadian Forces
