= Thomas Seaton Scott =

Canadian architect

- Born: 16 August 1826; Birkenhead, Cheshire, England, UK
- Died: 15 or 16 June 1895; Ottawa, Ontario, Canada
- Occupation: Architect
- Practice: Chief Dominion Architect
- Buildings: Union Station, Parliament of Canada, Cartier Square Drill Hall

Thomas Seaton Scott (16 August 1826 – 15 or 16 June 1895) was an English-born Canadian architect. Born in Birkenhead, England he immigrated to Canada as a young man first settling in Montreal. He was hired by the Grand Trunk Railway and worked for them on a number of structures including the Union Station in Toronto and Bonaventure Station in Montreal.

In 1871 he was hired by the Department of Public Works and he designed a number of Ottawa's new government buildings in the years after Canadian Confederation. Among his works are the West Block of the Parliament of Canada, the Cartier Square Drill Hall, and the now demolished Dominion Post Office. From 1872 to 1881 he held the position of Chief Dominion Architect and thus played at least a supervisory role in all major government projects. He is considered one of the creators of the Dominion Style that dominated Canadian institutional architecture in the nineteenth century. He was a founding member of the Royal Canadian Academy of Arts He was succeeded as Chief Architect by Thomas Fuller.

== Works ==
Building	Year Completed	Builder	Style	Location	Image St Luke's Church	Notes
Aurora Armoury	1874	Thomas Seaton Scott	Dominion Style Neo-Gothic style	89 Mosley Street at Larmont Street, Aurora, Ontario		Still in use by the military.
Mackenzie Tower, West Block	1878	Thomas Seaton Scott		Parliament Hill, Ottawa, Ontario		Provided design in 1874
Second Supreme Court of Canada building	1874	Thomas Seaton Scott	Gothic Revival architecture			Demolished 1955–56 and now parking lot
Cartier Square Drill Hall	1879–80	Thomas Seaton Scott	Dominion Style Neo-Gothic style	2 Queen Elizabeth Driveway, Ottawa, Ontario		Still in use.
Truro Armoury	1874	Thomas Seaton Scott	Dominion Style Neo-Gothic style	126 Willow Street, Truro, Nova Scotia		Still in use.
St. Bartholomew's Anglican Church (Ottawa)	1868	Thomas Seaton Scott	Dominion Style Neo-Gothic style	125 MacKay Street, Rideau-Rockcliffe Ottawa, Ontario		Still in use.
Summer House/Summer Gazebo, Parliament Hill	1877	Thomas Seton Scott	Carpenter Gothic	Parliament Hill, Ottawa, Ontario		Built for the Speaker of the House of Commons and demolished 1956. It was re-built in 1995 on the same location.
Toronto Union Station (1873) expansion	1888	Thomas Seaton Scott with Edward P. Hannaford	Dominion Style Italianate /2nd Empire style	Approximately at 7 Station Street, Toronto, Ontario		Demolished 1927–1931 and now site of Skywalk c. 1989
Grand Trunk Railway, Bonaventure Station	1888	Thomas Seaton Scott with Edward P. Hannaford	Dominion Style Neo-Gothic style	Near corner of rue Peel and rue Saint-Jacques, on Chaboillez Square, Montreal, Quebec		Heavily damaged by fire 1916, but remained standing until 1952. Now site of Dow Planetarium
Christ Church Cathedral (Montreal)	Dominion Style Neo-Gothic style	Thomas Seaton Scott	Gothic Revival	635 rue Saint Catherine Street Ouest, Montreal, Quebec		
St. Luke's Anglican Church, Waterloo QC	1870	Thomas Seaton Scott	Neo-Gothic style	400 rue de la Cour, Waterloo, Quebec		

Other buildings designed by Scott include:

- houses for Edward Prentice on Bleury Street in Montreal 1858
- St. John's Anglican Church 490 Centre Street, Prescott, Ontario 1858–60
- residence for Thomas Mussen, Sherbrooke Street West near Bleury Street, Montreal 1859
- villa for Peter Robertson on Redpath Street, Montreal 1859
- Erin Cottage for James E. Major on Guy Street near Dorchester Street West, Montreal 1859
- Cathedral School House, Anglican Cathedral, Burnside Place at University Street, Montreal 1860
- Lumberman's Royal Arch for the Prince of Wales, Ottawa, Ontario 1860
- Ballymena residence for Rev. Richard Lewis, Maitland, Ontario 1863
- Rosemount villas for Robert J. Reekie, Rosemount Avenue, Montreal 1863
- Richmond Railway Station, Richmond, QC 1863; burned down 1883
- Rowhouses for Edward G. Penny, St. Nicholas Tolentine Street, near Dorchester Street West, Montreal 1864
- Thomas Mussen store on Notre Dame Street at St. Lambert Street store for Thomas Mussen, Montreal 1865
- Murray Bay Protestant Church, Murray Bay, QC 1867
- Bishop Strachan Memorial Anglican Church, Cornwall, Ontario 1869–75; now Trinity Anglican Church
- St. Mark's Presbyterian Church, William Street, Montreal (Griffintown), 1869–70; demolished 1925?
- Additions to Cornwall Court House & Gaol, Pitt Street, Cornwall, Ontario 1869
- Grace Anglican Church, Wellington Street Montreal, 1870–71
- Rideau Cottage, Ottawa, 1872 renovations

Preceded by New post created 1871	Chief Dominion Architect, Canada; 1872 – 1881	Succeeded by Thomas Fuller
