= Toronto Union Station (1873) =

Railway station in Toronto, Ontario, Canada

Union Station
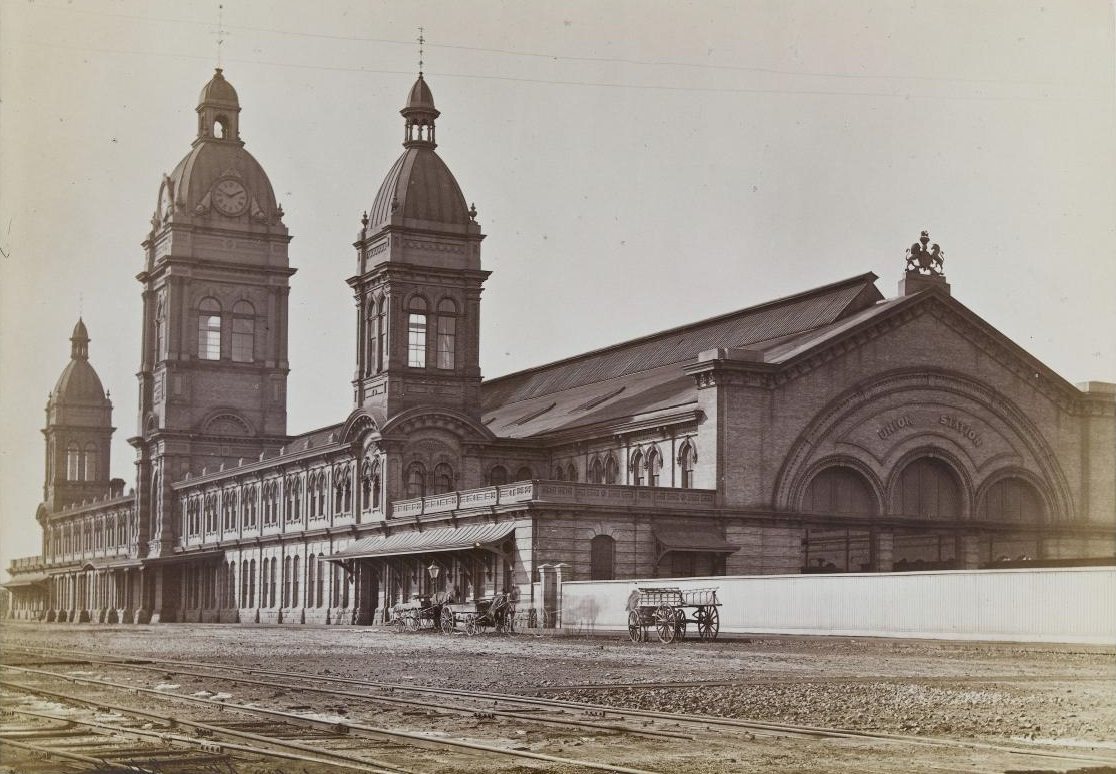

General information
- Location: 7 Station Street; Toronto, Ontario; Canada
- Coordinates: 43°38′41″N 79°23′1″W
- Owner: Grand Trunk Railway
- Tracks: 6

Construction
- Architect: Thomas Seaton Scott
- Architectural style: Italianate/Second Empire

History
- Opened: 1878
- Closed: 1927
Location

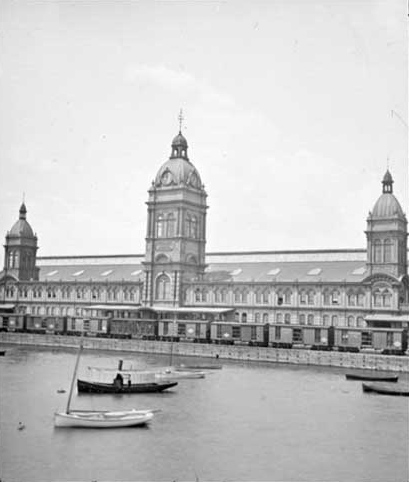
Union Station as viewed from the waterfront in 1888.

Toronto’s second Union Station was a passenger rail station located west of York Street at Station Street, south of Front Street in downtown Toronto. It was built by the Grand Trunk Railway (GTR) and opened in 1873, replacing the GTR's first Union Station, located at the same location.

== History ==
The first Union Station in Toronto was built by the Grand Trunk Railway (GTR) in 1858 at a location just west of the present Union Station train shed. The station consisted of three wooden structures and was initially shared between the Grand Trunk, the Northern Railway of Canada and the Great Western Railway, although the railways also built their own stations along the Toronto waterfront.

By the 1870s, the old station was no longer adequate. The Grand Trunk built a new Union Station on the same site that opened on July 1, 1873. At the time it was the largest and most opulent railway station in Canada and was designed in the Italianate/Second Empire style by architect Thomas Seaton Scott, who later designed Grand Trunk's Bonaventure Station in Montreal, Quebec. The builder was John Shedden & Co. and the Chief Engineer was the GTR's E. P. Hannaford. The main entrance and façade faced the harbour facilitating transfers between boat travel on Lake Ontario and the railway. As the Grand Trunk absorbed several smaller railways serving Toronto, passenger trains were increasingly consolidated at Union Station. The arrival of the Canadian Pacific Railway in 1884 increased traffic at the facility to over sixty trains a day.

In 1892, the railways agreed to expand the station through an extensive rebuilding program and Edmund Wragge was appointed the project's Chief Engineer. A new three-track train shed was built on the south side of the 1873 station. The most distinctive feature of the redevelopment was a new seven-story office building on Front Street, built of red brick and Credit Valley stone. This was designed in the Romanesque style by the Toronto architectural firm of Strickland & Symons. The building's façade closely resembled the Bradford Gilbert-designed Illinois Central Station in Chicago that had opened in 1893. An arcade over Station Street connected the new and old sections of the station. The renovated Union Station was officially unveiled and opened to the public on January 1, 1896.

The facility was a sprawling complex that never worked very well from either an architectural or an engineering point of view. An 1899 issue of Railway and Shipping World stated that “the general consensus of opinion is that the Toronto Union is one of the most inconvenient stations in (North) America, expensive to run and unsatisfactory in very many other respects.”

By 1900, it was clear a new station was needed. The Great Toronto Fire of 1904 swept through the city's warehouse and manufacturing district, including the block immediately east of Union Station bounded by Bay, Front and York Streets. It was decided to build a new Union Station on this site in 1905 but the railways and the city couldn't agree on the design of the facility or how the tracks should be brought into the station. Meanwhile, Union Station continued to serve the people of Toronto, to no one's satisfaction. By 1911, there were about 150 trains and 40,000 people a day using the station. Construction on the new station began in 1915 but was delayed by a wartime shortage of construction workers, financing and building materials as well as the impending bankruptcy of the Canadian Northern and Grand Trunk Railways.

The new Union Station headhouse and east and west office wings were completed in 1920, but didn't open to the public for another seven years while the railways and the city continued to argue over the approach tracks. On August 10, 1927, the new Union Station opened and the old station was dismantled over the next year. The clock faces from the centre tower were removed on August 17, 1927 and later given to the town of Huntsville, Ontario and installed on the town hall building. The 1895 office building on Front Street survived until 1931 when it was demolished.

The site is now occupied by the SkyWalk pedestrian bridge, a station for the UP Express and a commercial office buildings (Citigroup Place and 151 Front West) on Front Street.

== Gallery ==
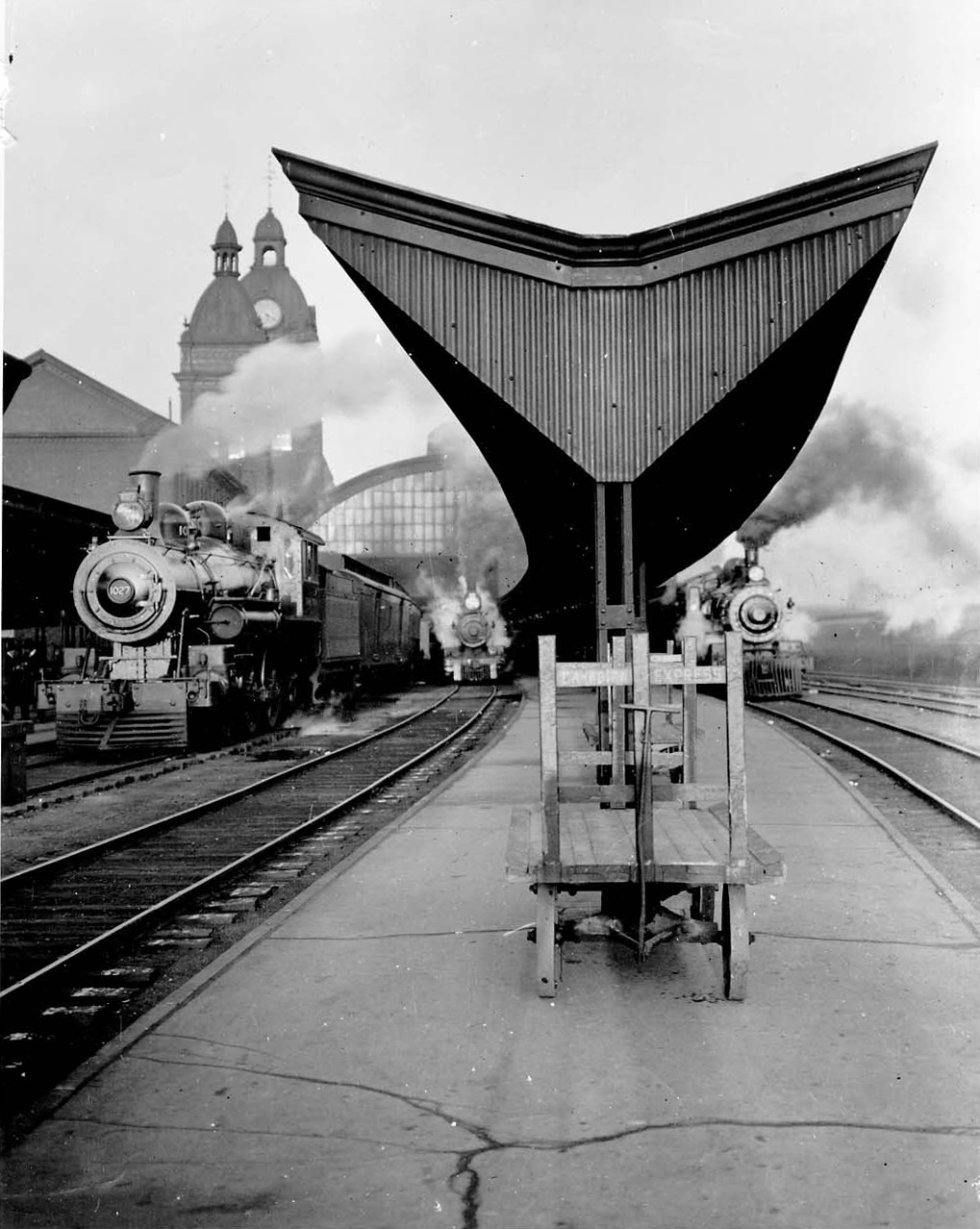
Union Station

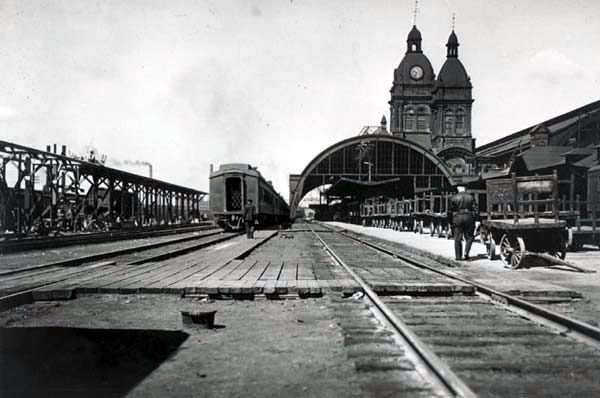
Union Station

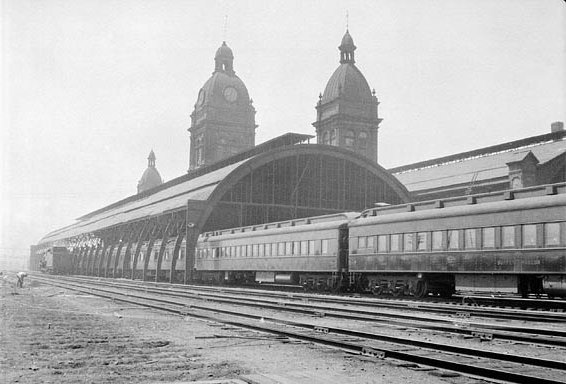
Union Station as it appeared in 1927

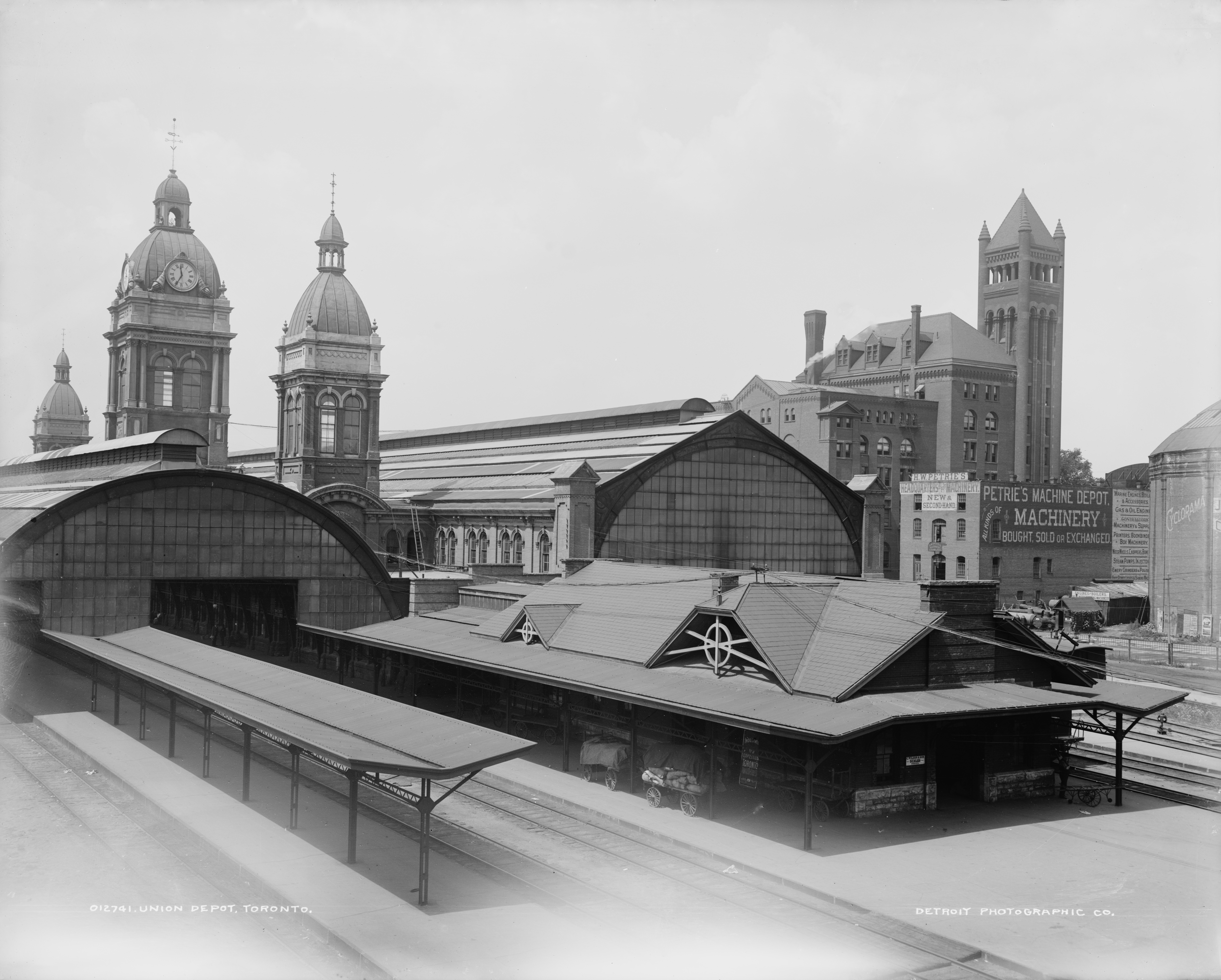
Union Station 1890-1901

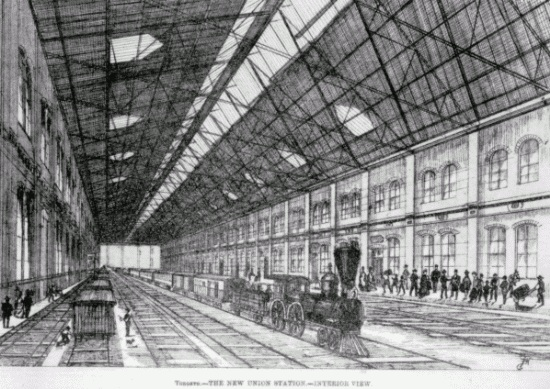
Sketch of train shed interior

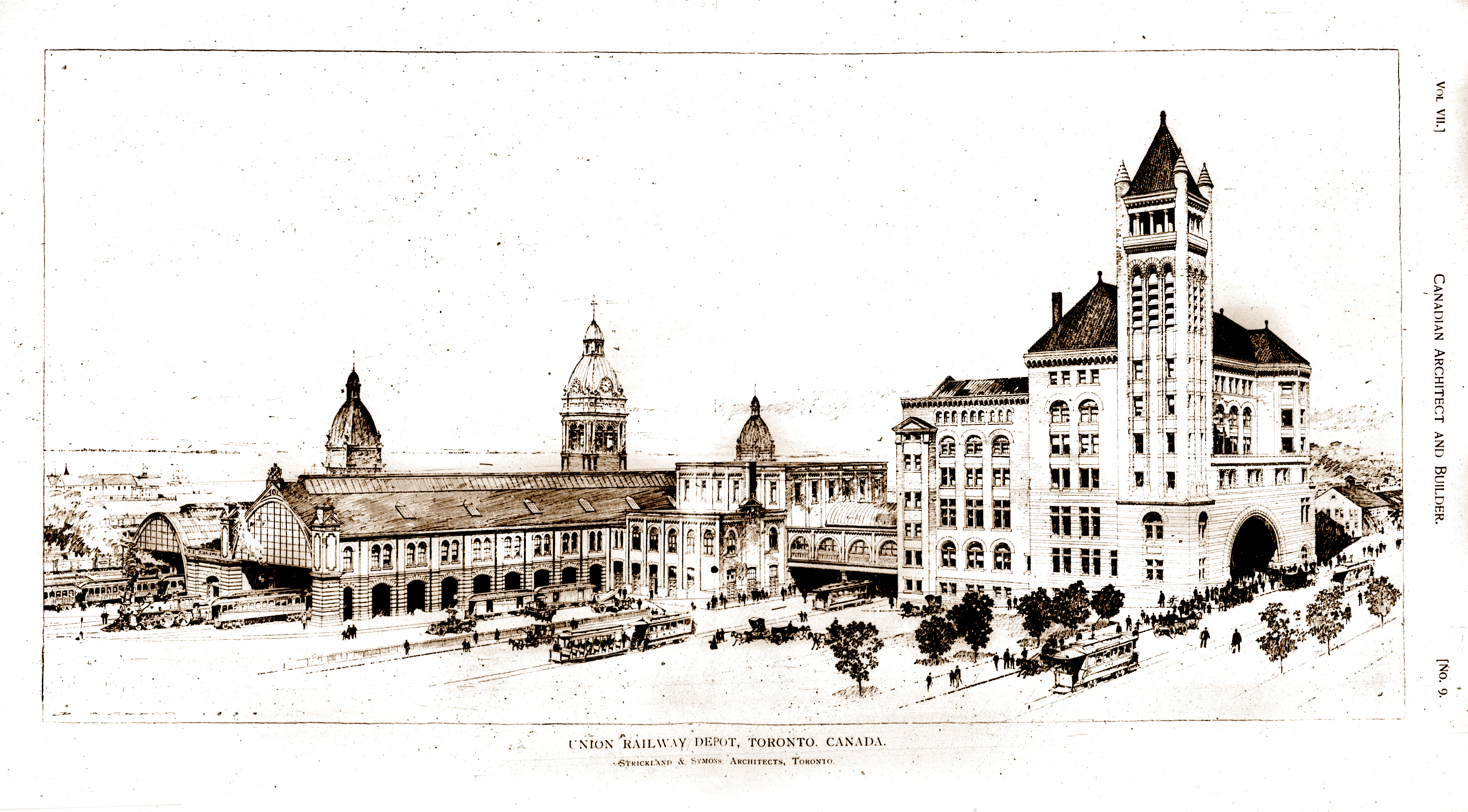
1894 Architectural drawing of the Front Street expansion

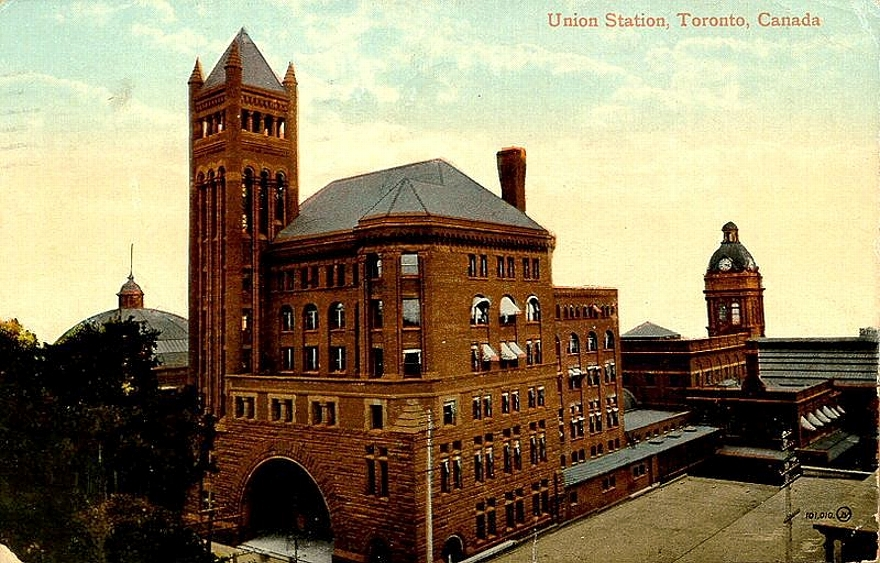
The Front Street expansion of the station, as seen in 1913
