= Pipes and Drums of the Cameron Highlanders of Ottawa =

Pipe band in the Canadian Forces

The Pipes and Drums of The Cameron Highlanders of Ottawa
- Established: 1921
- Location: Ottawa
- Pipe major: Sergeant Brennan Pinkerton-Kock
- Tartan: Cameron of Erracht
- Website: https://camerons.ca/pipes-and-drums/
- Sponsor: Music Branch (Canadian Forces)

The Pipes and Drums of The Cameron Highlanders of Ottawa is an authorized pipe band in the Canadian Forces, attached to of Headquarters and Service Company of The Cameron Highlanders of Ottawa. It provides musical support for regimental and extra-Regimental activities as directed by the commanding officer. Outside of musical duties, the 25-members of the Pipes and Drums participate in Individual Battle Task Standards (IBTS), which requires it to augment "A" Company during field training exercises.

The Pipes and Drums were founded in 1921 when it was just known as The Ottawa Regiment. During the Second World War, it accompanied the regiment during its tour of duty while based in Iceland and the United Kingdom.

== Uniform ==
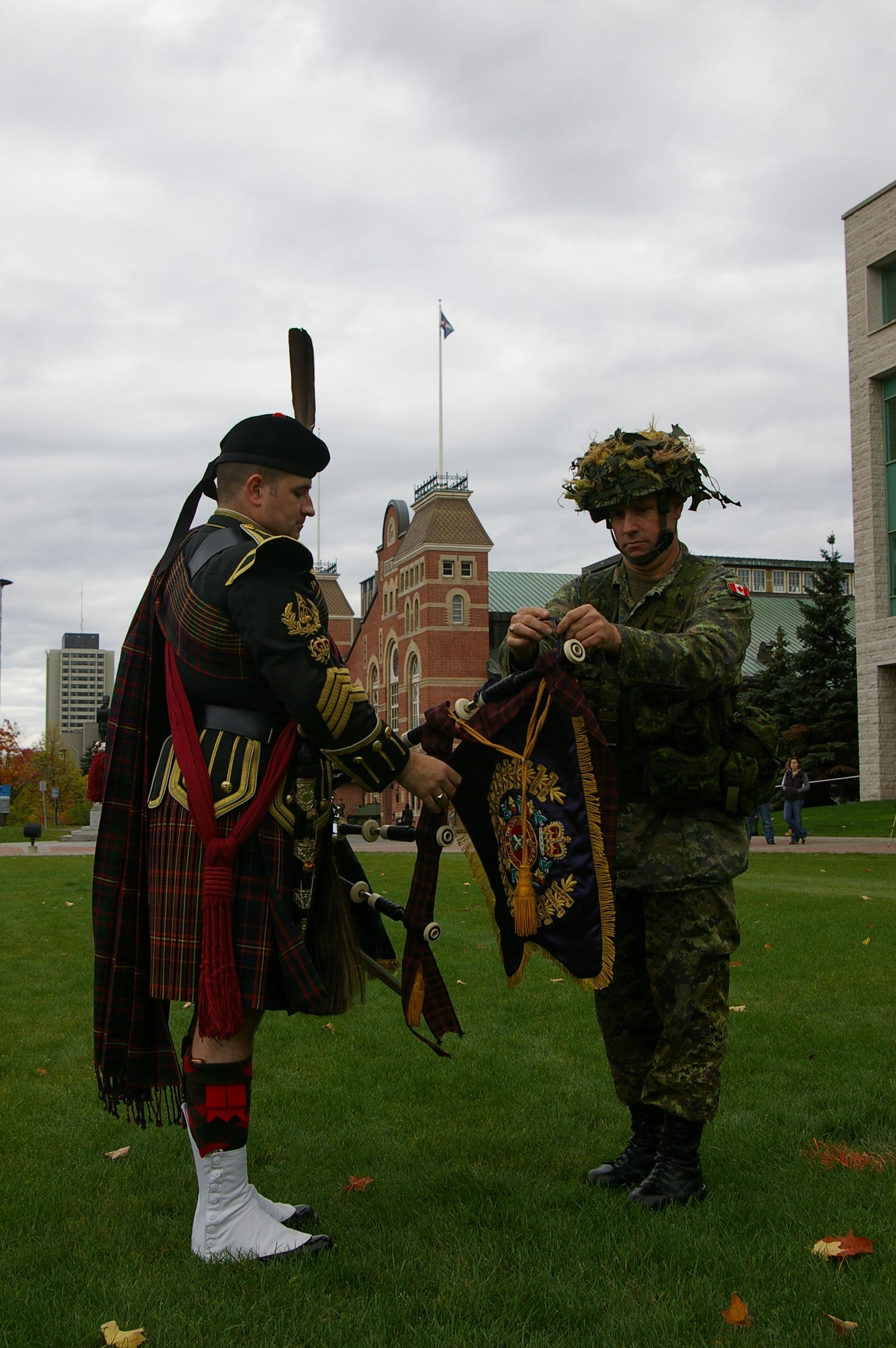
Lieutenant-Colonel Bud Walsh presents a pipe banner to then-Pipe Major Alan Clark on 20 October 2007.

Being a Highland regiment, the dress uniform of the pipes and drums is based on traditional Scottish military dress. It marches in Scottish kilts and wear a tartan unique to the Cameron Highlanders of the Canadian and British forces. In addition, they also wear a leather sporran, oxford shoes and white spats. The regiment also wears feather bonnets that are worn for ceremonial purposes the annual Remembrance Day parade near the National War Memorial.

Less formal orders of dress have generally been a mix of standard military service dress (either battle dress, DEU or shirtsleeves) and Highland dress as appropriate.

== Public appearances ==
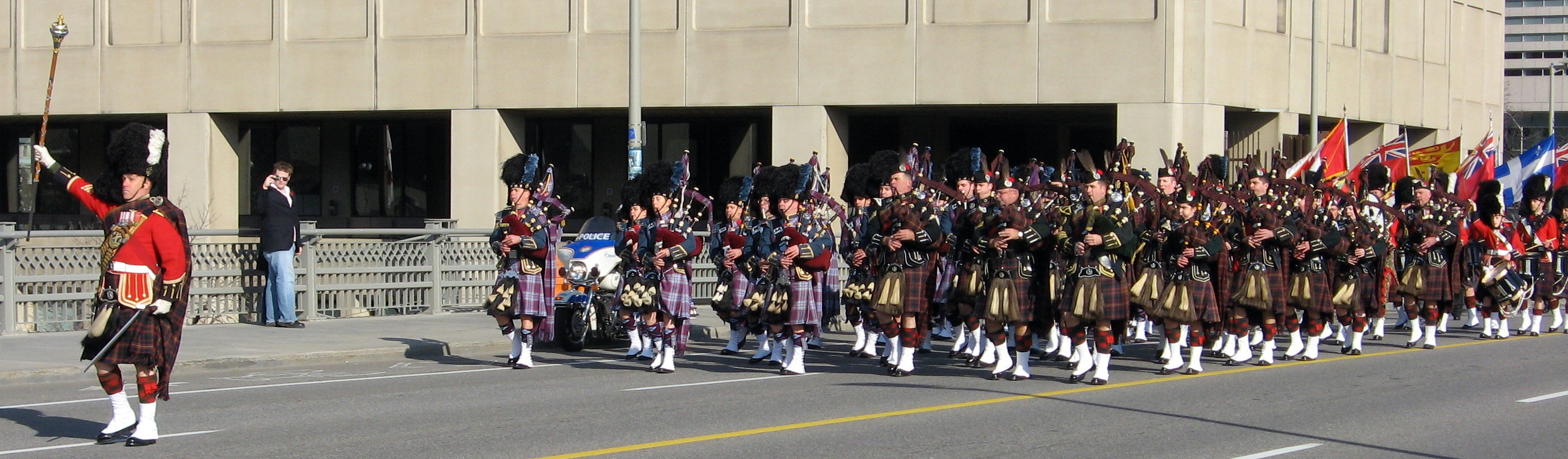
Members of the pipe band (right) parading with other pipe bands through Ottawa, November 2007.

- It has participated in many of the military and state functions that take place in Ottawa, including leading the marchpast on Wellington Street during the National Remembrance Day Parade.
- The Pipes and Drums were part of the marching contingents in the Dutch victory parade of 1945 in Utrecht.
- The Pipes and Drums has taken part in the Edinburgh Tattoo in 1974 and 1983.
- In 1976, it travelled to Pasadena, California to take part in the Tournament of Roses Parade.
- The band has also performed on a regular basis in smaller festivals, such as tattoos in Lethbridge, Edmonton and Estes Park.
- The band has taken part in the funerals of former members of the regiment including former members of the band.
