= Connaught Cadet Training Centre =

Coordinates: 45°21′27″N 75°54′22″W

- Active: 1989 – 2023; 2027 – present
- Country: Canada
- Type: Cadet Training Centre
- Size: 167 Army/Air/Sea Cadets (2023) ~50 Army/Air/Sea Staff Cadets ~30 Cadet Instructors Cadre Officers, CF members & civilian staff
- Part of: Canadian Cadet Organization
- Garrison/HQ: Ottawa, Ontario
- Motto: Intende Directe (Shoot Straight)

Commanders
- Current commander: Commanding Officer; LCol Andre Raymond, CD

Connaught Cadet Training Centre (Connaught CTC) (French: Centre d'instruction des cadets de Connaught; CIC Connaught) is a training centre for Royal Canadian Army Cadets, Royal Canadian Air Cadets, and Royal Canadian Sea Cadets since 1989. It is located at the Connaught Range and Primary Training Centre (CRPTC), in Ottawa, Ontario, and trains approximately 500 cadets each summer in 3, 4, 6, and 9 week courses. Administered by the Canadian Forces, the program is funded through the Department of National Defence.

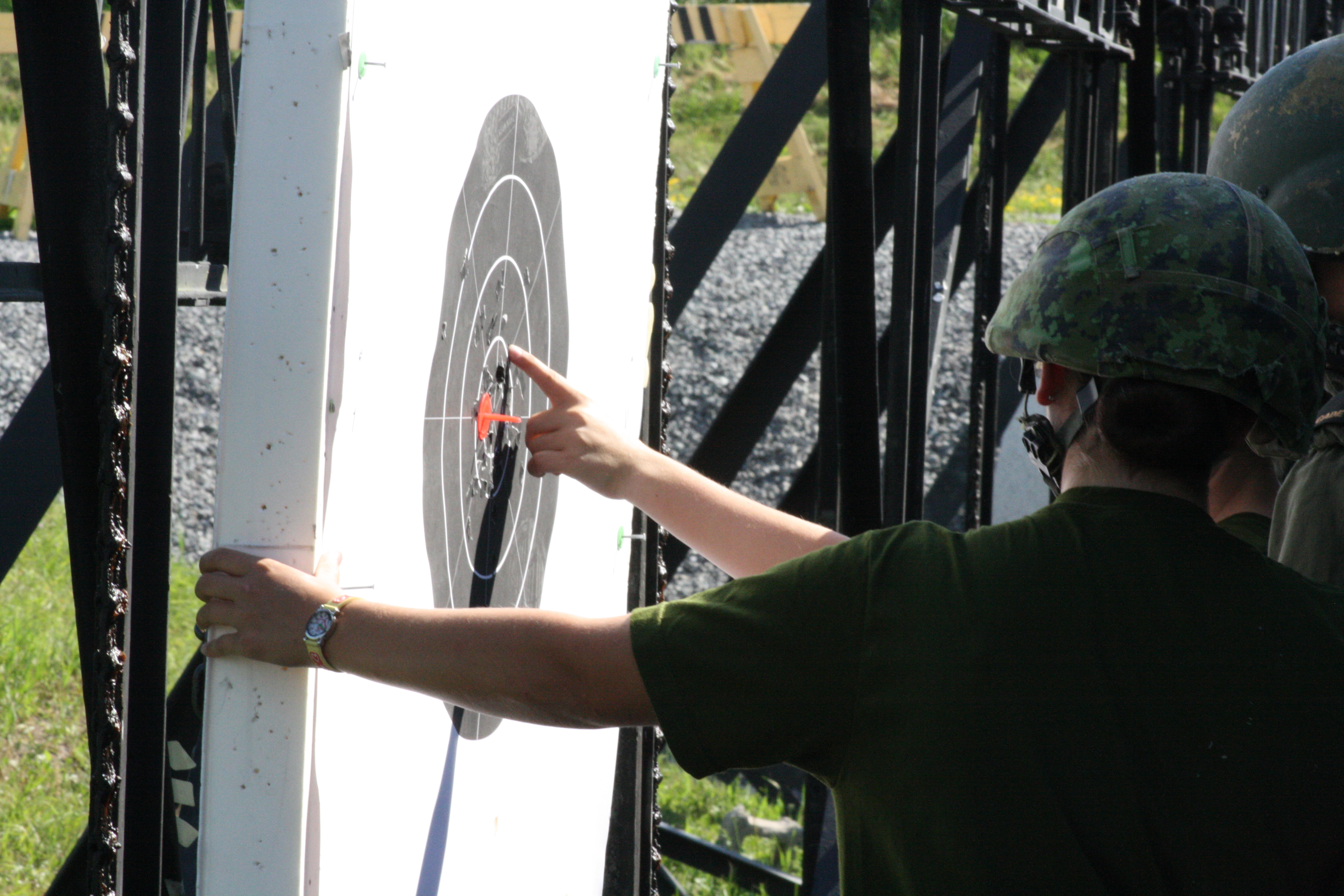
Cadets on the Fullbore Marksman Phase I Course mark targets in the butts at Connaught Range and Primary Training Centre (CRPTC), in Ottawa, Ontario

.

== History ==
The ranges at Connaught have been in operation for the better part of the last century serving the Canadian Forces. Through the 1970s and into the early 1990s, cadets on shooting courses attended various regional camps across the country including Pat Bay, Vernon, and Victoria, BC; Winnipeg, MB; Calgary, AB; Dundurn, SK amongst others.

In 1989 Connaught National Army Cadet Summer Training Center (Connaught NACSTC) was established to allow all marksmanship courses across Canada to amalgamated at Connaught. Prior to that time, cadets had been attending Connaught on advance to Bisley or as a jump off point for exchange cadets.

Since its inception, Connaught NACSTC has trained thousands of cadets, including four that would become Commanding Officers.

== Connaught Range and Primary Training Centre (CRPTC) ==
In CRPTC, Remembrance Park, a cairn and artefacts are dedicated to Veterans and the men and women of the Canadian Forces.

== Marksmanship Courses ==
=== Basic Marksman Course ===
The aim of this three-week-long course is to provide cadets with the fundamentals of air rifle marksmanship, building upon what has been experienced at the Corps training level. This aim is accomplished through the development of skills and the provision of ample opportunities for practical skill applications. The course promotes the development of marksmanship competition, sportsmanship, and teamwork. By establishing a dynamic learning environment that exposes the cadets to a variety of air rifle marksmanship opportunities, this course works to inspire the cadets to further pursue Marksmanship opportunities at the Corps level as well as on the Air Rifle Marksmanship Instructors Course, or the Fullbore Marksman Phase I Course. The cadets that attend this Basic Marksman course are provided with the basic theoretical, technical, and practical skills required to assist in the delivery of the Corps marksmanship program.

=== Air Rifle Marksmanship Instructor Course ===
This three-week course develops individual air rifle marksmanship skills as well as summer biathlon specialty skills while reinforcing and further developing leadership and instructional skills. These skills are necessary to help prepare cadet instructors. This will help them fulfill a support role in the air rifle and biathlon activities at the Corps level, during regionally directed activities and/or as a staff cadet at a CSTC. The cadet instructors are provided with the necessary theoretical, technical, and practical skills required to monitor and instruct other cadets during marksmanship training at the Corps, while building their own skill and knowledge to bring it back to their corps/squadron. Once the course is concluded the individual may assist the RSO (Range safety officer) along with eager cadets, to the best of the individuals ability.

=== Fullbore Marksman Phase I Course ===
This six week course develops a specialist with the skills and subject matter knowledge required to participate in competitive fullbore marksmanship as an individual competitor. Cadets are provided with the necessary theoretical, technical, and practical skills required to participate as a large-bore 5.56mm rifle competitor.

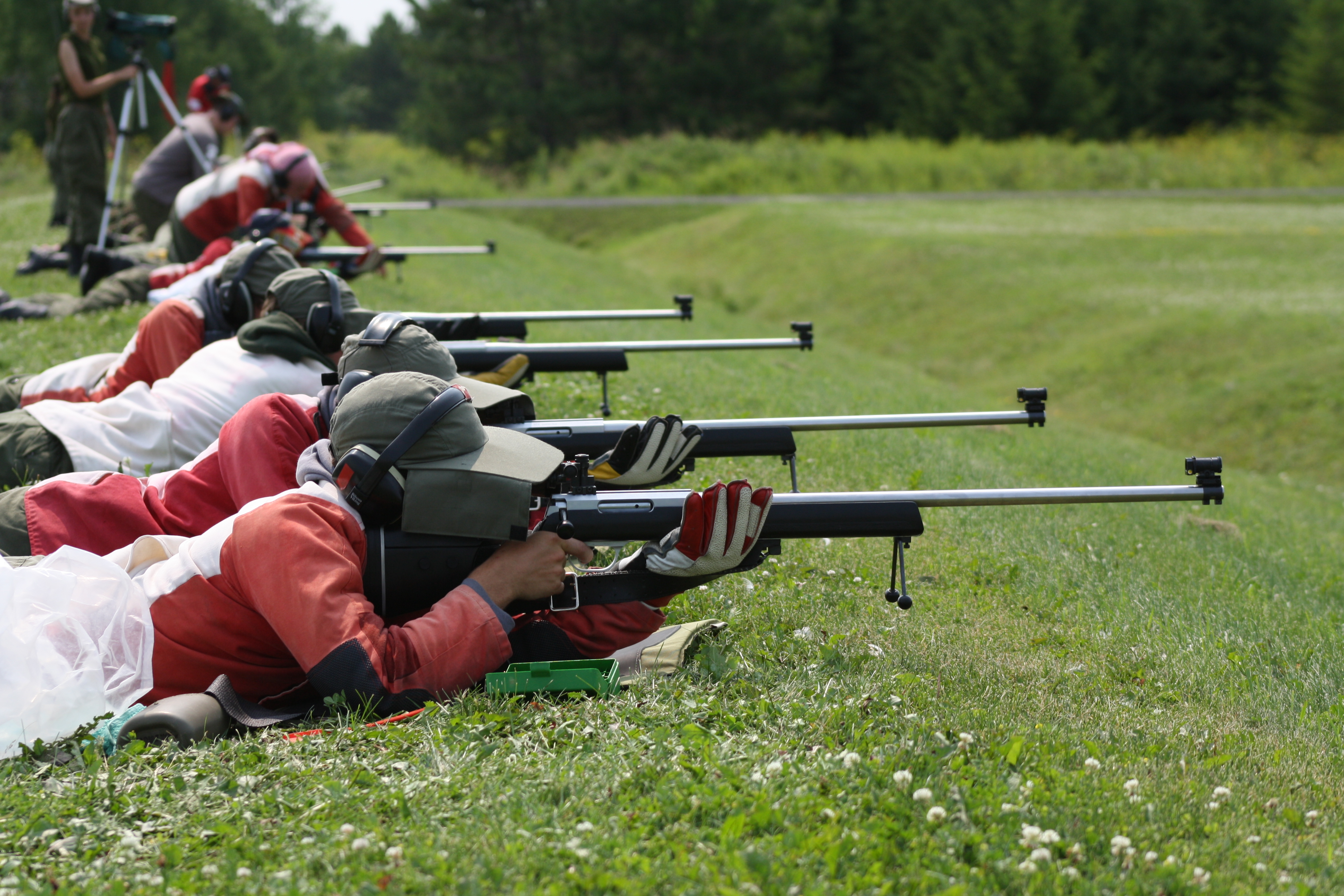
Cadets on the Fullbore Marksman Phase II Course on Alpha Range at Connaught Range and Primary Training Centre (CRPTC), in Ottawa, Ontario

=== Fullbore Marksman Phase II Course ===
The aim of this seven-week course is to develop a specialist with the attitude, skills, and subject matter knowledge required to participate in competitive fullbore marksmanship as a member of a competitive team. Course cadets are provided with the necessary theoretical, technical, and practical skills required to participate as a large-bore 7.62mm rifle competitor. Fullbore Phase II course cadets participate in the Canadian National Cadet Fullbore Championship, the Ontario Rifle Associations' Provincial Fullbore Championship and the Dominion of Canada Rifle Associations' National Fullbore Championship.

== Advanced Training & International Exchanges ==
=== Royal Canadian Army Cadets National Rifle Team (NRT) ===
This international eight-week course develops a specialist with the attitude, skills, and subject matter knowledge required to participate in competitive fullbore marksmanship as a member of a competitive team at the international level. Course cadets are provided with the necessary theoretical, technical, and practical skills required to participate as a large-bore 7.62mm rifle competitor. Course cadets participate in the Canadian National Cadet Fullbore Championship, the United Kingdom's International Fullbore Championship in Bisley, England and the Dominion of Canada Rifle Associations' National Fullbore Championship. For most of the summer cadets are based in Bisley, England.

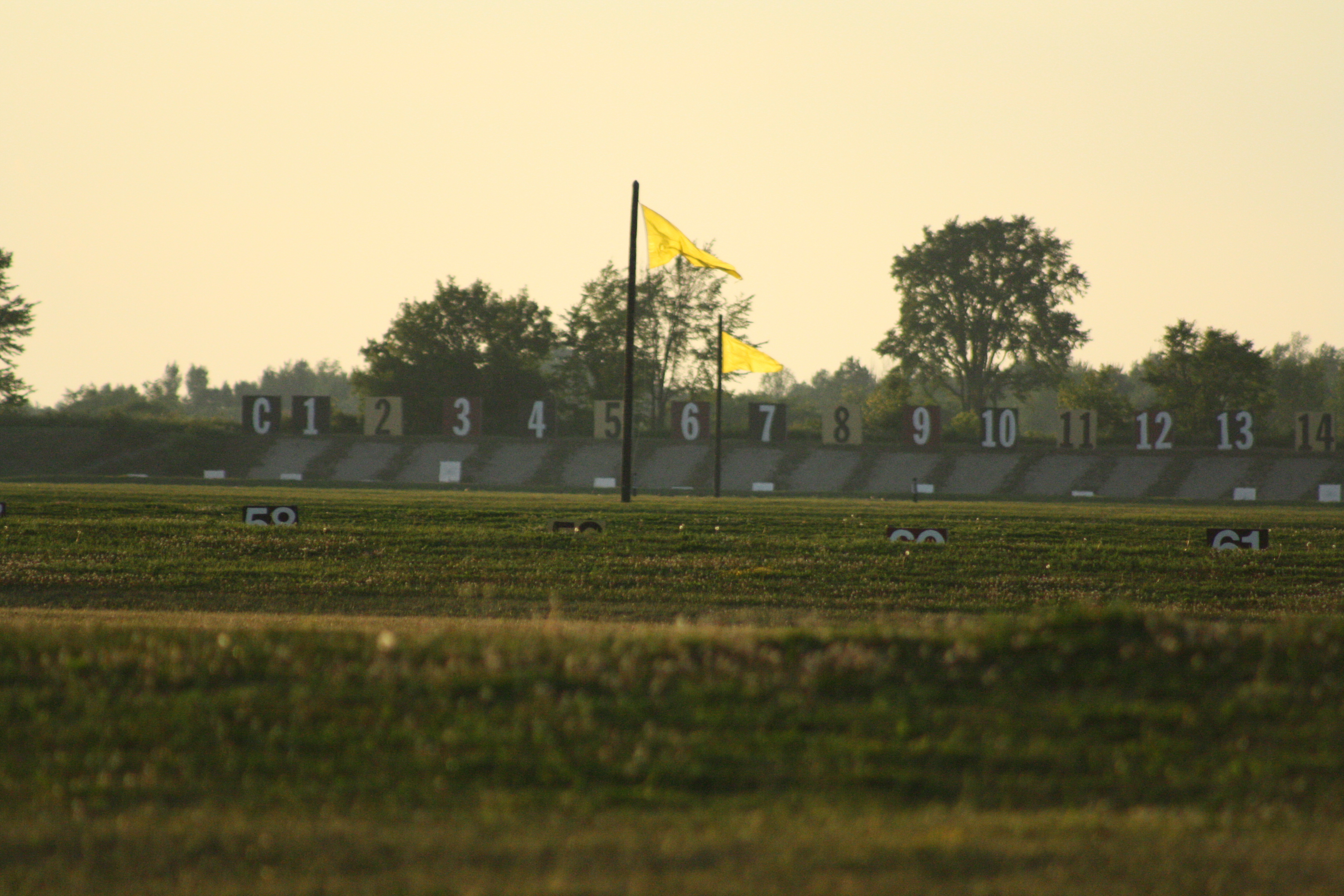
Sunset after a hot summer day at Connaught Ranges.

=== United Kingdom Exchanges: Outward Bound Wales(OBW)/Outward Bound Scotland (OBS)/Maple Leaf Exchange (MLE) ===
These six-week exchanges introduce cadets to the training of Army Cadet Force in the United Kingdom in Wales, Scotland, and England as well as providing cadets an opportunity to participate in cultural activities and touring. In order to be eligible, cadets must be medically and physically fit, must be 16 by the start of the exchange, have no participation limitations which may preclude them from participating in intense level adventure training activities in remote locations overseas and in high altitudes, have achieved minimum the Bronze Level of the Cadet Fitness Assessment Incentive Level, be motivated to pursue outdoor leadership and adventure training activities, and must have completed Gold Star training.

=== Army Cadet Exchanges (ACE): Australia/United States of America/Cayman Islands ===
These three-week exchanges introduce cadets to the training of the Army Cadets in Australia, USA and Cayman Islands, as well as providing cadets an opportunity to participate in cultural activities and touring. Cadets must be medically and physically fit, must be 16 by the start of the exchange, have no participation limitations which may preclude them from participating in intense level adventure training activities in remote locations overseas and in high altitudes, have achieved minimum the Bronze Level of the Cadet Fitness Assessment Incentive Level, be motivated to pursue outdoor leadership and adventure training activities, and must have completed Gold Star training.

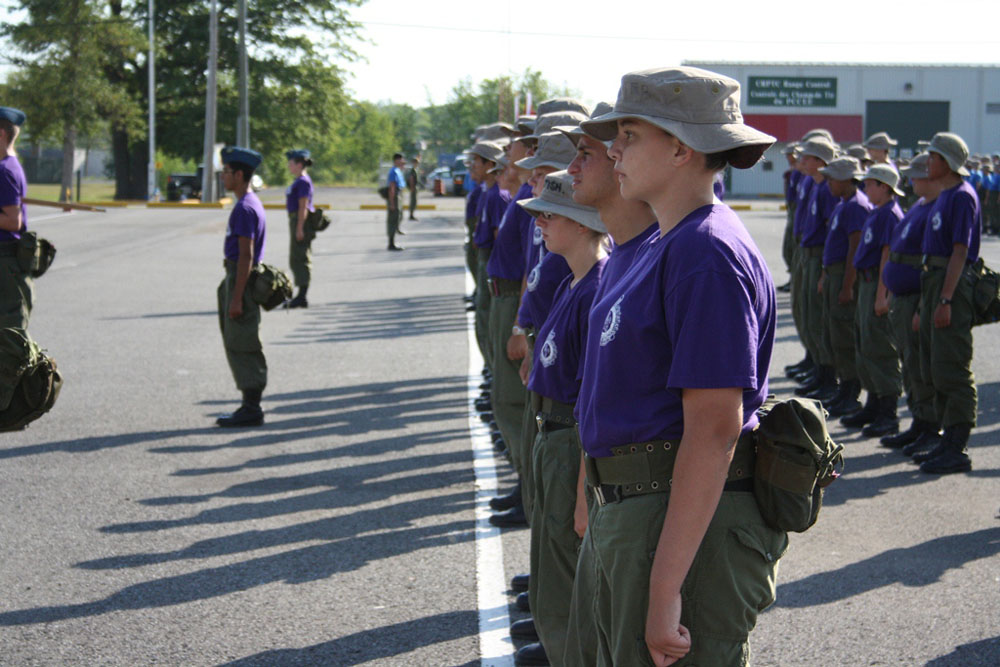
Cadets from Delta Company on Battalion Parade.

== Commanding officers ==
Since the formation of Connaught NACSTC, there have been 6 Commanding Officers (CO):

- Major Doc Cameron, CD, 1989–90
- Major Hugh MacConnell, CD, 1991–93
- Lieutenant Colonel Lloyd Sainsbury, CD, 1994-2008
- Lieutenant Colonel Robert Barrette, CD, 2009-2015
- Commander Paul Fraser, CD, 2015-2019
- Lieutenant Colonel André Raymond, CD, 2019-2021
