= McGill Street Terminal =

Railway station in Montreal, Quebec, Canada

Coordinates: 45.4990°N 73.5542°W

The McGill Street Terminal is a former interurban railway station located in Montreal, Quebec. It is located on the corner of Rue Marguerite-d'Youville and McGill Street. The building today houses a branch of Restaurant Pizzaiolle, a local pizza restaurant chain.

Although the words Gare Union have been placed above the building's main entrance, the building has never been known by this name and never served as a union station.

== History ==
The McGill Street terminal was built in 1909 by the Montreal and Southern Counties Railway (M&SC), an interurban electric railway company which had come under the control of the Grand Trunk Railway.

Grand Trunk became part of Canadian National Railway (CNR) in 1923. Plans to bring the M&SC trains closer to the CNR's Bonaventure Station mainline terminal never materialized. However, a convenient transfer with the Montreal Tramways 29-Outremont streetcar line was available at McGill Street.

The station was the terminus for suburban and interurban service to towns on the south shore such as Saint-Lambert, Longueuil, Greenfield Park, Saint-Hubert, Chambly and Granby. M&SC trains crossed the Saint Lawrence River on one of the side decks of the Victoria Bridge (the central part of this railway bridge being reserved for mainline freight and passenger trains).

The station was closed in 1955, when the M&SC's side deck on the bridge was converted to an automobile traffic lane in anticipation of modifications to accommodate the Saint Lawrence Seaway.
