= Le Gardeur station =

Railway station in Quebec, Canada

Coordinates: 45.7541°N 73.4752°W

Le Gardeur station was on Saint-Paul Street in the Le Gardeur district of Repentigny, Quebec, Canada.

The station was marked only by a signpost and was a request stop for two Via Rail routes from Montreal, Quebec. Via Rail announced that as of August 7, 2015, and "for safety reasons related to the railway crossing", all trains serving the two routes would no longer stop there, effectively shutting down the station. Passengers were directed to use L'Assomption station, which in turn, would close down in 2017 following the opening of RTM's Sauvé and Anjou.

Former services
Preceding station	Via Rail	Following station
L'Assomption toward Jonquière	Montreal–Jonquière	Pointe-aux-Trembles toward Montreal
L'Assomption toward Senneterre	Montreal–Senneterre	Pointe-aux-Trembles toward Montreal
