= Terminal Tower (disambiguation) =

Terminal Tower is a skyscraper in Cleveland, Ohio, United States. It could also refer to:

- Terminal Tower (Montreal), Canada
- Terminal Tower (Linz), Austria
- Terminal Tower (album), by the Cleveland-based rock group Pere Ubu
