= Mansfield Street =

Mansfield Street may refer to:

- Mansfield Street (Montreal), Canada
- Mansfield Street, London, England
- Mansfield Street, Karachi, Pakistan
