= Pointe-aux-Trembles station (Via Rail) =

Railway station in Montreal, Quebec, Canada

Pointe-aux-Trembles
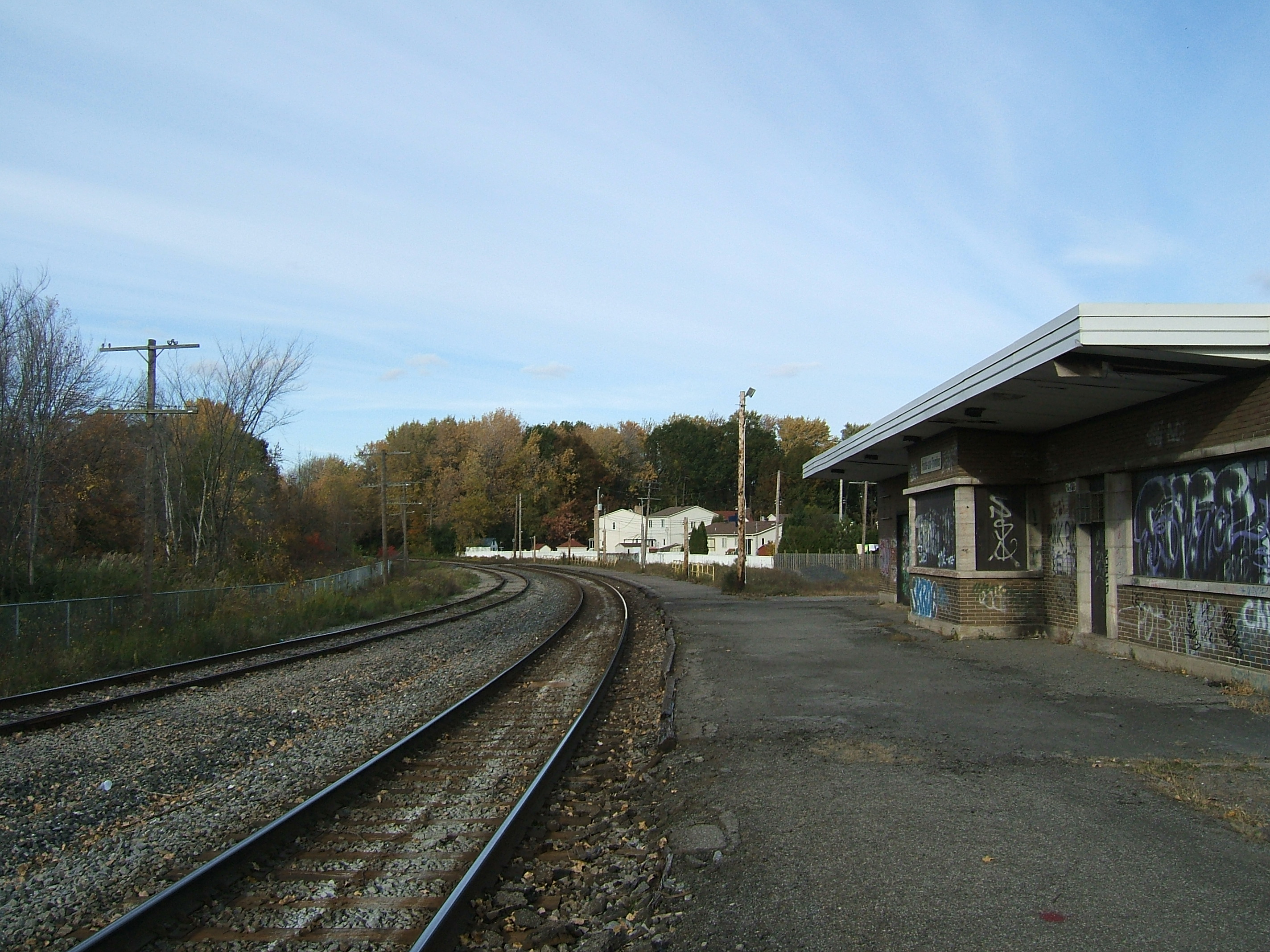

General information
- Location: 64e Avenue & Prince Albert Street; Pointe-aux-Trembles, Quebec; Canada
- Coordinates: 45°40′42″N 73°29′40″W
- System: Via Rail station

History
- Closed: 2013

Former services
Preceding station	Via Rail	Following station
Ahuntsic toward Jonquière	Montreal–Jonquière	Le Gardeur toward Montreal
Ahuntsic toward Senneterre	Montreal–Senneterre	Le Gardeur toward Montreal
Location

Pointe-aux-Trembles station (French pronunciation: [pwɛ̃t o tʁɑ̃bl]) was a railroad station in Montreal, Quebec, Canada. It was located on the corner of Prince-Albert Street and 64th Avenue in the Rivière-des-Prairies–Pointe-aux-Trembles borough.

The station has a disused station building and was an optional stop for two Via Rail routes from Montreal until January 3, 2013. Passengers were directed to use Montreal Central Station, Ahuntsic, or Le Gardeur stations. The Mascouche commuter train line is served by the Pointe-aux-Trembles station nearby.

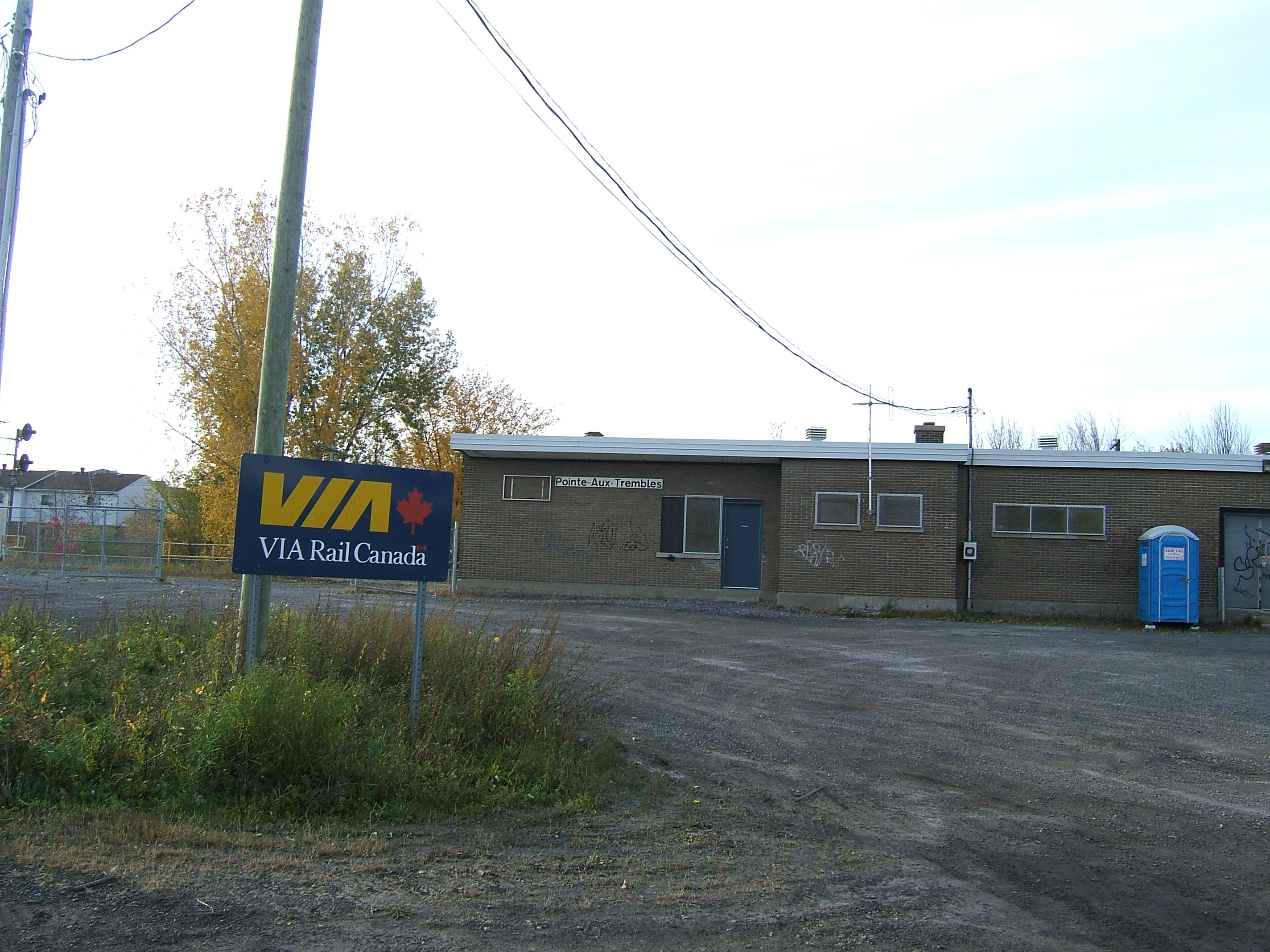
The disused station building viewed from the corner of 64e Avenue and Prince Albert Street, a portable toilet is visible on the right

.
