= McGill Street (Montreal) =

Thoroughfare in Montreal, Canada

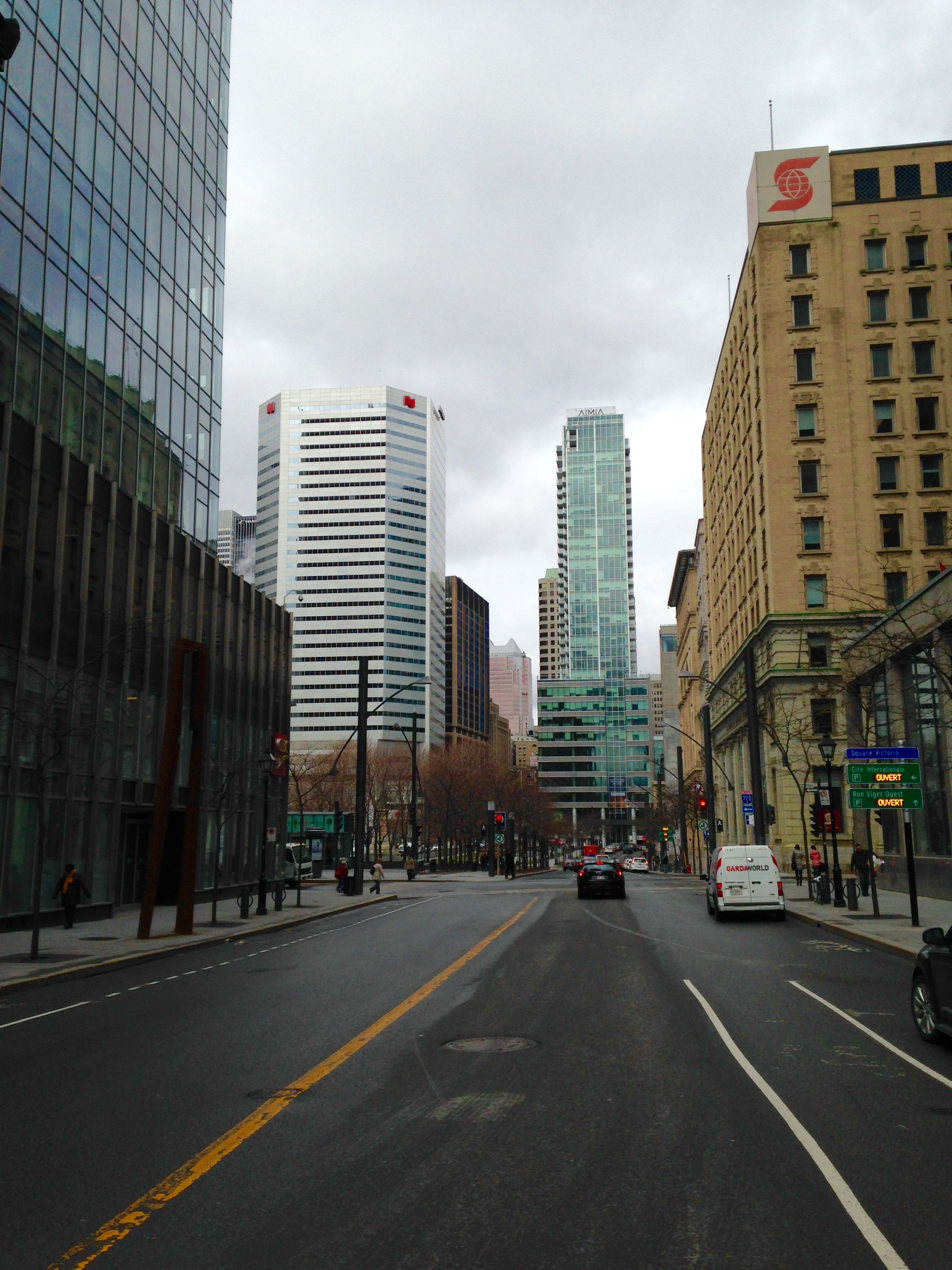
- McGill Street, looking north.
- Interactive map of McGill Street
- Native name: rue McGill (French)
- Length: 0.7 km (0.43 mi)
- Location: Between Victoria Square and De la Commune Street
- Coordinates: 45.500401°N 73.557879°W
- Major junctions: R-136 Ville-Marie Expressway (via service roads Viger Avenue and Saint Antoine Street)

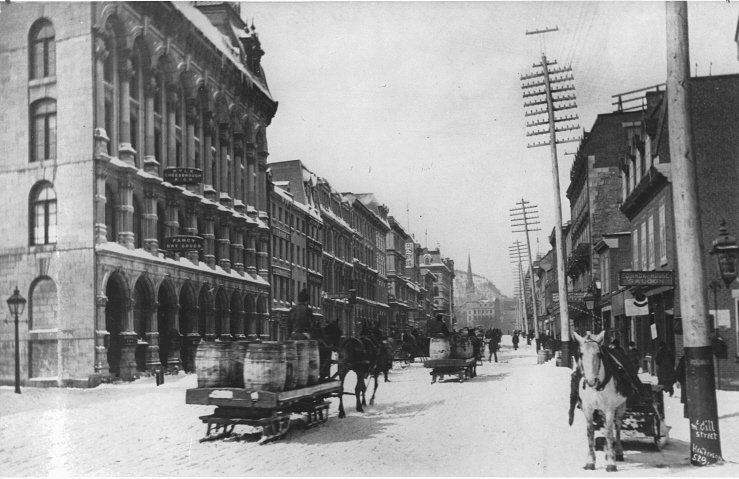
McGill Street in 1869.

McGill Street (officially in French: rue McGill) is a street in Montreal named after James McGill after whom McGill University is named. The former head office building of Canadian National Railway Company, built for its predecessor Grand Trunk Railway, still stands on McGill Street and is now occupied by Quebec government offices.

In 1871, an advertisement for the Albion Hotel in an Ottawa newspaper called McGill Street "the great thoroughfare and commercial centre of the city". The McCord Museum of Canadian History refers to the street as "an important artery in Montreal."

The Quartier International de Montréal (Montreal's international district) describes McGill Street as "the link between the strategic sectors of the Old Port, Old Montreal, the Cité Multimedia and the Quartier international."

The Montreal station of the Montreal and Southern Counties Railway interurban streetcar line was located on McGill Street. The station building is still standing, although no longer used for transportation purposes.

Square-Victoria–OACI metro station is located near the end of the street.

McGill Street runs from Victoria Square south to rue de la Commune in the Old Port, at the head of the Lachine Canal. North of Victoria Square, the street transitions to Beaver Hall Hill.
