= Rue de la Commune =

Thoroughfare in Montreal, Canada

rue de la Commune
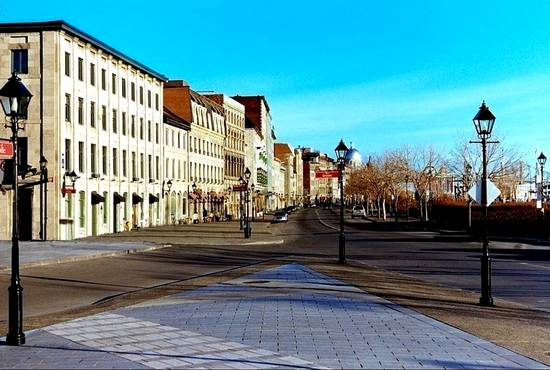
- Former name(s): rue des Commissaires (Commissioners' Street), rue Water (Water Street), rue Colborne (Colborne Street), Common Street
- Owner: City of Montreal
- Length: 2.3 km (1.4 mi)
- Coordinates: 45.505102°N 73.553235°W
- West end: Wellington Street, Griffintown
- East end: Rue Atateken, Le Village

Rue de la Commune (English: De la Commune Street) is a road in Old Montreal, Quebec, Canada which is well used both by Montrealers and by tourists, since it is the home of the Pointe-à-Callière Museum and the Old Port of Montreal. It also extends eastward into the Gay Village, and westward into Griffintown, where it turns north to Wellington Street and becomes the beginning of Peel Street. The road follows the original shore of the Saint Lawrence River. The buildings along the north side of the road are former commercial buildings.

== History ==
In 1651, the governor of Montréal, Paul Chomedey de Maisonneuve granted land to Jean de Saint-Père to be used as pasture. This 'commune' (commons) is a strip of land one arpent wide with 40 arpents of shoreline.

The river bank was the site of a tow path, and became a road, lined with grain elevators from 1879. It became a thoroughfare for carriages, transport wagons, and pedestrians. Lower streets along the riverbank were known to flood during winter storms.

A proposed elevated highway along the river over the Rue de la Commune spurred a movement to preserve the district. Dutch-born architect and urban planner Daniel van Ginkel played a major role in saving the district from destruction during the early 1960s. As assistant director of the city of Montreal's newly formed planning department, he persuaded authorities to abandon plans for an expressway that would have cut through the old city. In 1964, most of Old Montreal was classified as a historic district.

In 1970, the road was renamed from rue des Commissaires, in memory of early colonial days. After the Port of Montreal was moved, the area became a recreational area in 1992. Hotels, restaurants, and cafes replaced old warehouses.

== Gallery ==
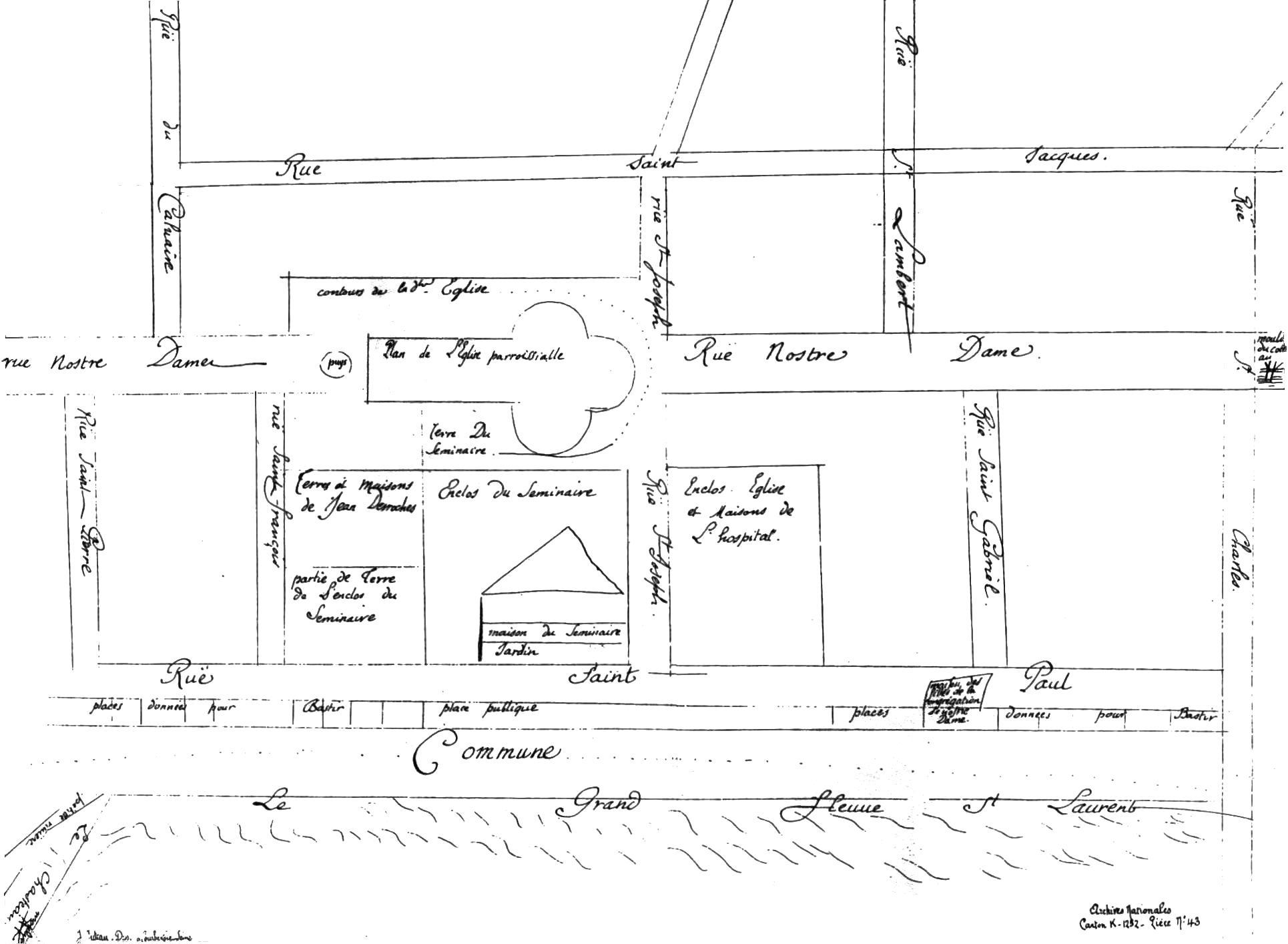
Map of Ville-Marie, 1672 by François Dollier de Casson

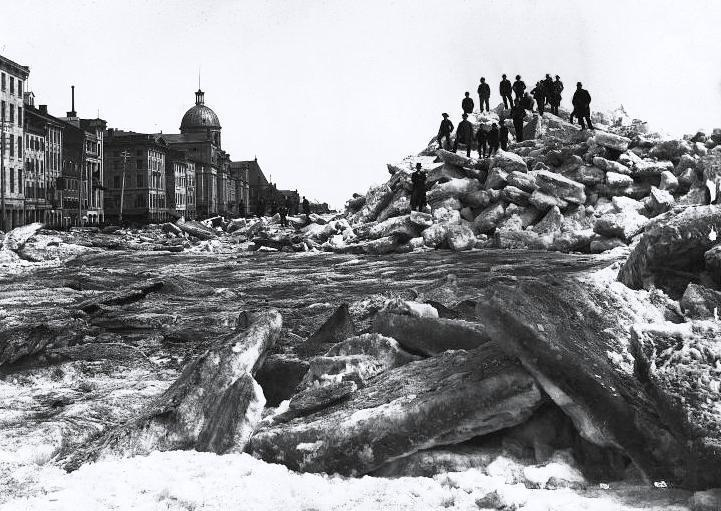
c. 1884

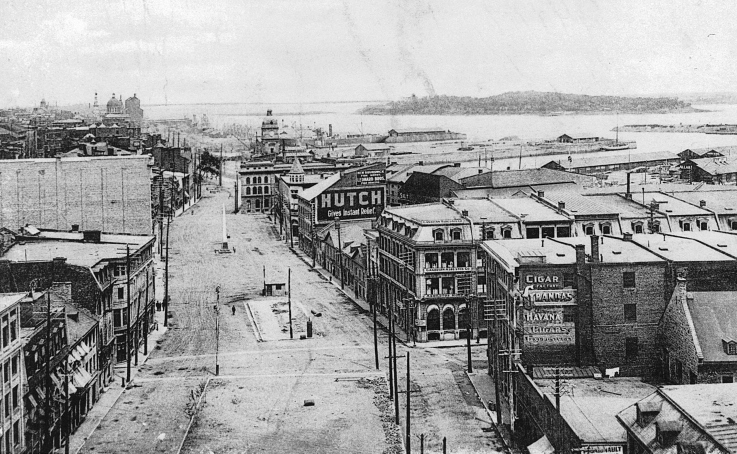
c. 1910

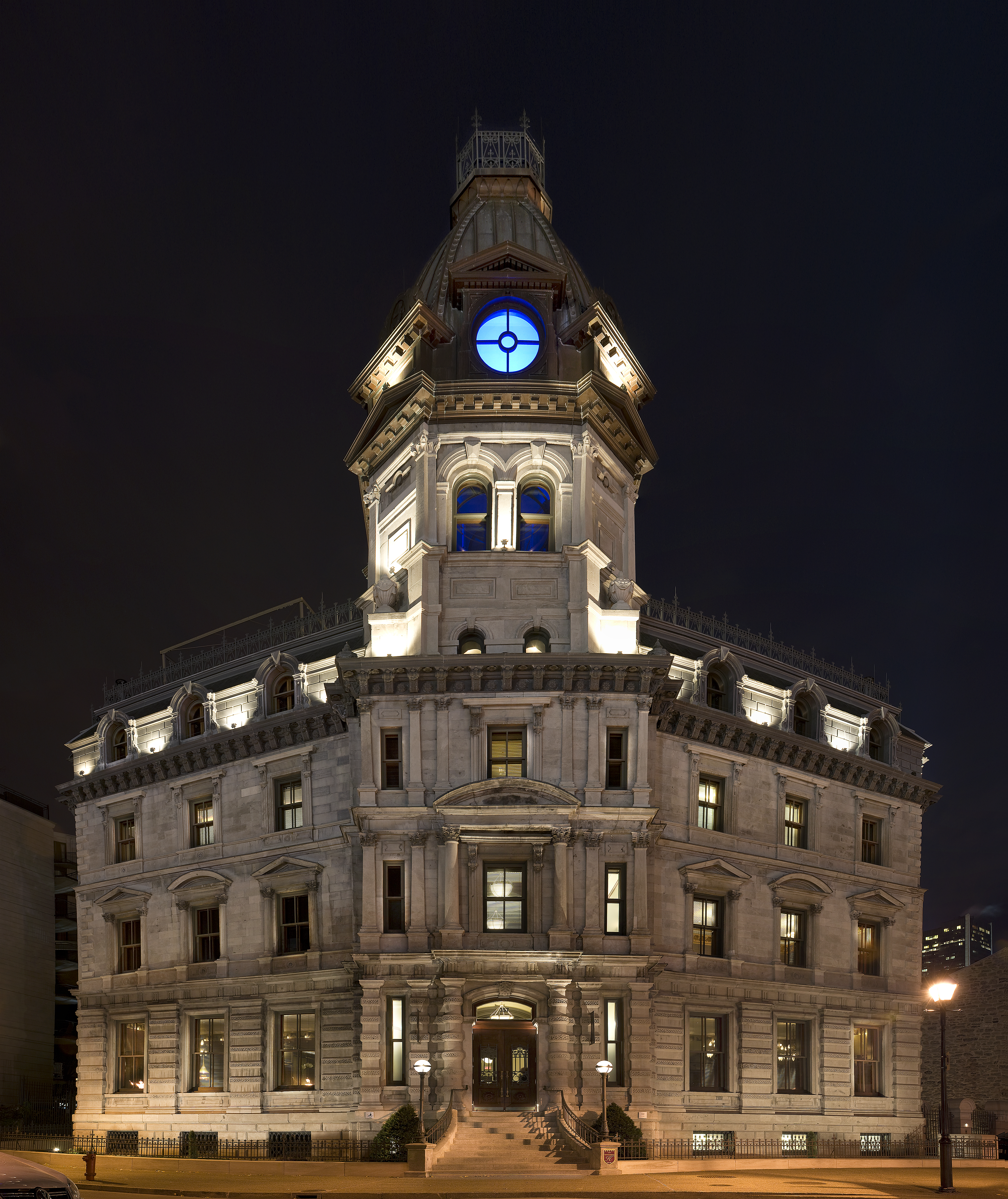
357 rue de la Commune Ouest
