= Bonaventure Station (1887–1952) =

Railway station in Montreal, Quebec, Canada

Coordinates: 45.4964°N 73.5647°W

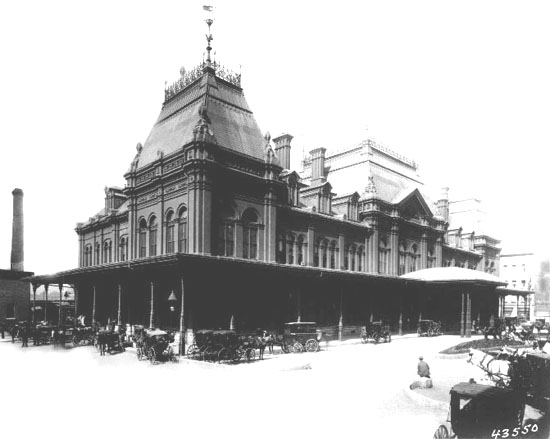
The Grand Trunk Railway's Bonaventure Station in the 1870s. The station structure roughly corresponded with Chaboillez Square in downtown Montreal. This building was heavily damaged by a fire in 1916, after which it was given a flat roof.

Bonaventure Station was the name of a railway station in Montreal, Quebec, Canada. Its name was later adopted by a commercial development (Place Bonaventure) and a metro station (Bonaventure station).

== Grand Trunk Railway ==
Named for its location on Saint Bonaventure Street, now Saint Jacques Street, the first Bonaventure Station was built in 1847 as the main terminal for the Montreal and Lachine Railway. In 1861, the Grand Trunk Railway (GTR) made an agreement to share the station, thereby obtaining a more centrally located Montreal terminal than their existing station near the Victoria Bridge approach. The GTR leased the Montreal and Lachine Railway in 1864 and purchased it outright in 1867, thus becoming owner of the station.

Several other railways also used Bonaventure Station over the years, though it was not referred to as a union station. Notably, the Intercolonial Railway obtained running rights over the Grand Trunk into Montreal at the end of the 1880s; Bonaventure Station thus became its western terminal for service to and from Halifax, Nova Scotia, and other points in the Maritimes (see Ocean Limited).

In 1886–1888, a new, larger Bonaventure station building was built on the same site, to the plans of architect Thomas Seaton Scott in the Second Empire style. As with the similar 1873 Toronto Union Station, the Grand Trunk's Chief Engineer E. P. Hannaford also contributed to the project.

During the railway boom from the 1880s to the early 1910s, railways considered their terminal stations to be "prestige projects". Around the time construction began on the new Bonaventure Station, the competing Canadian Pacific Railway (CPR) started work just two blocks away on Windsor Station, an imposing Richardsonian structure opened in 1889. As the CPR began work on expanding Windsor Station in 1900, the GTR, not to be outdone, seriously considered building a replacement for Bonaventure Station. A design for a new station was commissioned from Chicago architects Charles S. Frost and Albert Hoyt Granger. In the end, however, the new station was never built as the GTR began to focus on its Grand Trunk Pacific transcontinental railway project.

On March 1, 1916, a fire broke out in the GTR's Bonaventure Station. Firemen from Fire Station No. 3 on Ottawa Street arrived fast enough to save most of the building from complete destruction. The GTR was in a dire financial situation and could only replace the original ornate roof with a flat one.

== Canadian National Railways ==
In 1910, the Canadian Northern Railway (CNoR) came to town and secretly purchased three entire blocks of downtown Montreal property for a major terminal and real estate development to coincide with the construction of its Mount Royal Tunnel. A temporary terminal facility was constructed to coincide with the tunnel project; however, financial difficulties at CNoR resulting from declining traffic levels following the commencement of World War I delayed completion. In September 1918 CNoR went bankrupt and was nationalized by the federal government, merging the company with Canadian Government Railways that December to form Canadian National Railways (CNR).

GTR faced similar financial problems and by 1923 was also absorbed into the Canadian National Railways. As the two systems were not conveniently interconnected, CNR continued to use both the GTR's Bonaventure Station and the temporary CNoR station at the southern end of the Mount Royal Tunnel line; however it was clear that the new railway required a combined central terminal in Montreal. In 1929, six years after absorbing GTR, Parliament approved the "Canadian National Montreal Terminals Act, 1929" which began the process of consolidating and rationalizing terminal trackage in the Montreal area. The Depression, along with a government-imposed moratorium on the project, caused major delays. Almost 15 years later on July 14, 1943, CNR finally opened Central Station on the former CNoR lands. The temporary CNoR station was then closed.

Bonaventure Station remained in use for a few commuter trains after the opening of Central Station. On August 23, 1948, an explosion followed by a massive fire destroyed most of the Bonaventure Station's freight yards and impeded rail access to the station building. All remaining passenger service was then moved to Central Station. Bonaventure Station was demolished in November 1952.

== Montreal Metro ==
The lands acquired by CNoR in the early part of the 20th century for its real estate developments were inherited by CN and the federal government. During the post-war years, CN commissioned a major urban redevelopment of the city's downtown using these properties, focusing on its newly built Central Station.

In addition to Place Ville Marie, the Queen Elizabeth Hotel, and the CN Headquarters, Montreal became home to one of the largest commercial retail/office developments in the world when Place Bonaventure was built above part of the Montreal Central Station terminal trackage. Although the site was a few blocks northeast of the former location of Bonaventure Station, the name was chosen to commemorate it. This development was built between 1966 and 1967, in advance of Expo 67. The Dow Planetarium (closed in 2011) was built on the actual site of the former Bonaventure Station.

A Montreal Metro station was built to serve Place Bonaventure, Central Station, and the CPR Windsor Station complex. It opened on February 13, 1967, and is named Bonaventure station. Until the line was extended in 1980, it served as the terminal of Orange Line.

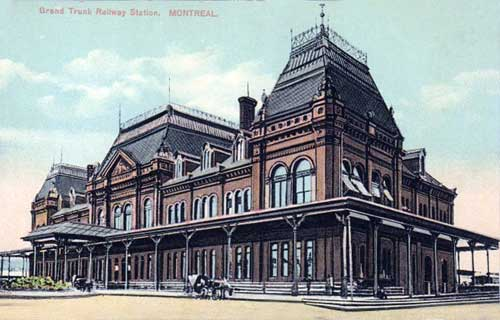
Grand Trunk Railway Station
