= Terminal Tower (Montreal) =

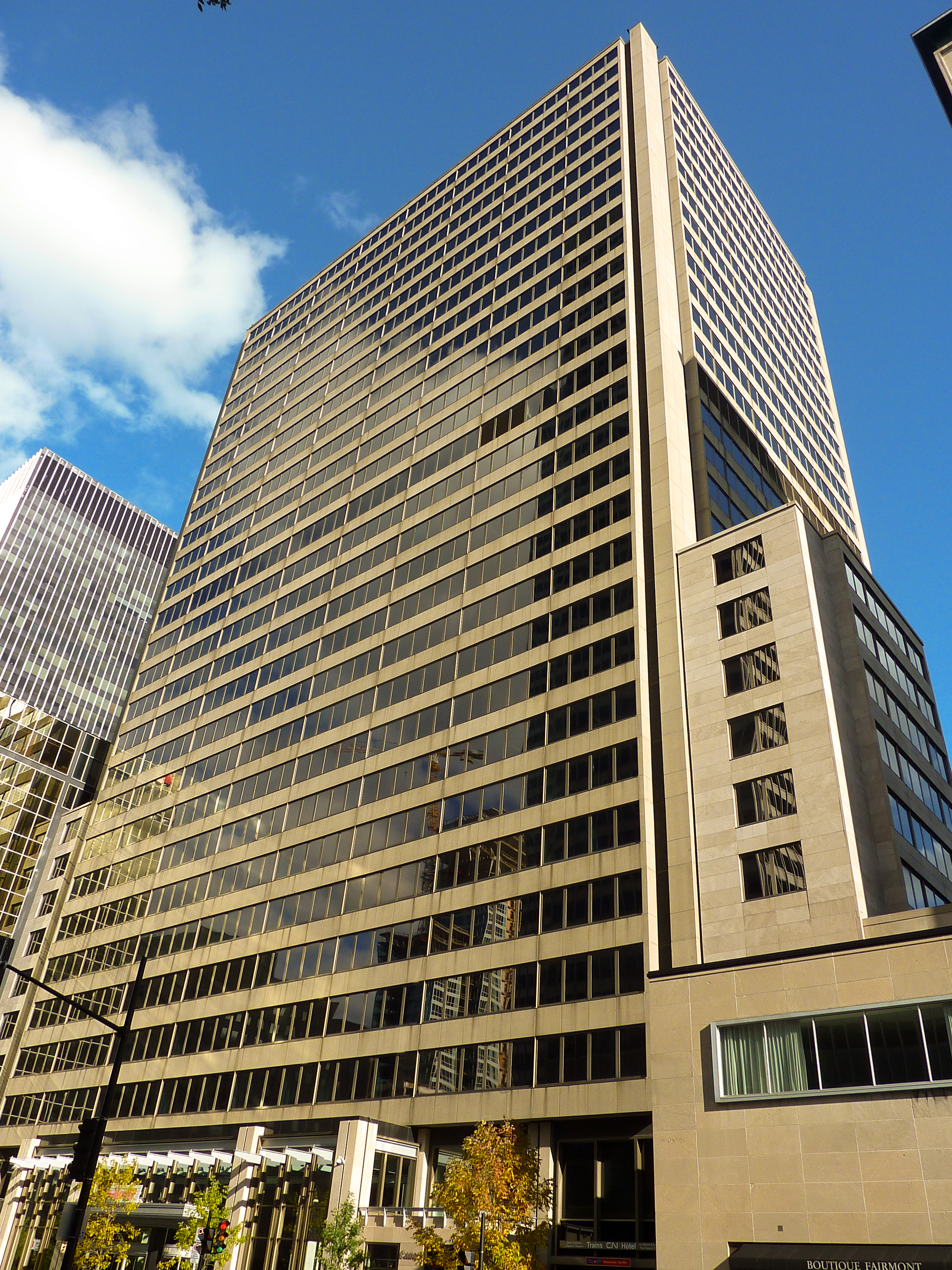

General information
- Type: Office
- Location: 800 René Lévesque Boulevard West, Montreal, Quebec, Canada
- Coordinates: 45.501454°N 73.567350°W
- Completed: 1966

Height
- Roof: 125 metres (410 ft)

Technical details
- Floor count: 30
- Lifts/elevators: 13

The Terminal Tower (also known as Le 800 René Lévesque) is a skyscraper in downtown Montreal, Quebec, Canada. It is 30 storeys, and 125 metres (410 ft) tall. Completed in 1966, it was the last phase of CN's developments in the area, along with the Queen Elizabeth Hotel, Central Station and the CN Building. It was built in the international-style architecture, with a concrete and glass facade. The Terminal Tower is located at 800 René Lévesque Boulevard West opposite Place Ville-Marie, and next to the Queen Elizabeth Hotel.

== Tenants ==
- Numeris/BBM Canada
- Bombardier Inc.
- Ernst & Young
- Tembec
- Transport Canada

== See also ==
- List of tallest buildings in Montreal
