= Montreal Central Station =

Railway station in Montreal, Canada

Montreal Central Station Gare centrale de Montréal
- Montreal Central Station entrance in 2026

General information
- Location: 895 De la Gauchetière Street West; Montreal, Quebec
- Coordinates: 45°29′59″N 73°34′00″W
- Owner: Cominar (since 2012); Homburg Invest Inc. (2007–2012); CN (1943–2007)
- Lines: Quebec City–Windsor Corridor; Réseau express métropolitain
- Platforms: 6 island platforms (in use)
- Tracks: 18
- Bus operators: STM bus at Bonaventure; Réseau de transport de Longueuil at Terminus Centre-Ville; Exo bus services at Terminus Centre-Ville
- Connections: Orange Line at Bonaventure

Construction
- Structure type: At-grade
- Parking: Yes, paid park and ride
- Cycle facilities: Bike boxes available
- Accessible: Yes
- Architect: John Schofield; concourse design by John Campbell Merrett

Other information
- Station code: Via Rail: MTRL; Amtrak: MTR; REM: GCT
- IATA code: YMY
- Fare zone: ARTM: A

History
- Opened: 1943; 83 years ago
- Rebuilt: 1967; 59 years ago (Place Bonaventure)

Passengers
- 10,018,800 (AMT 2015); 593,081 (Via 2012); 45,772 (Amtrak FY 2025)

Services
Preceding station	Via Rail	Following station
Sauvé toward Senneterre	Montreal–Senneterre	Terminus
Sauvé toward Jonquière	Montreal–Jonquière	Terminus
Dorval toward Toronto	Toronto–Montreal	Terminus
Terminus	Ocean	Saint-Lambert toward Halifax
Dorval toward Ottawa	Ottawa–Québec City	Saint-Lambert toward Quebec City
Preceding station	Amtrak	Following station
Terminus	Adirondack	Saint-Lambert toward New York
Preceding station	Exo	Following station
Terminus	Line 13 – Mont-Saint-Hilaire	Saint-Lambert toward Mont-Saint-Hilaire
Preceding station	REM	Following station
McGill toward Deux-Montagnes or Anse-à-l'Orme	Réseau express métropolitain	Île-des-Soeurs toward Brossard
Future services
Preceding station	REM	Following station
McGill toward Airport	Réseau express métropolitain (opens 2027)	Île-des-Soeurs toward Brossard
Preceding station	Amtrak	Following station
Proposed services
St. Albans toward Washington, D.C.	Vermonter	Terminus
Former services
Preceding station	Canadian National Railway	Following station
Services in 1948
Lachine toward Vancouver	Main Line	Terminus
Turcot East toward Sarnia	Grand Trunk Railway; Main Line	Terminus
Lachine toward Ottawa	Montreal – Ottawa; Semi-local stops	Terminus
Turcot East toward Vaudreuil	Montreal – Vaudreuil; Local stops	Terminus
L'Epiphanie toward Rivière-à-Pierre	Montreal – Rivière-à-Pierre	Terminus
Portal Heights toward Rawdon	Montreal – Rawdon; Local stops	Terminus
Mount Royal toward Lac Remi	Montreal – Lac Remi	Terminus
Portal Heights toward St. Eustache-sur-le-Lac or Hawkesbury	St. Eustache-sur-le-Lac services	Terminus
Terminus	Central Vermont Route	St. Lambert toward East Alburgh
Terminus	Montreal – Moncton	St. Lambert toward Moncton
Terminus	Montreal – Victoriaville	Bridge Street toward Victoriaville
Terminus	Montreal – Fort Covington	Bridge Street toward Fort Covington
Terminus	Montreal – Portland	Bridge Street toward Portland
Terminus	St. Johns services	Bridge Street toward Waterloo or Rouses Point
Preceding station	Via Rail	Following station
Terminus	Atlantic	Saint-Lambert toward Halifax
Dorval toward Vancouver	The Canadian Before 1990	Terminus
Preceding station	Exo	Following station
Before 2020
Canora toward Deux-Montagnes	Deux-Montagnes	Terminus
Canora toward Mascouche	Line 15 – Mascouche	Terminus
Before 2026
Ahuntsic toward Mascouche	Line 15 – Mascouche Limited service	Terminus
Preceding station	Amtrak	Following station
Terminus	Montrealer	Saint-Lambert toward Washington, D.C.
Track layout
Location
- Location within Montreal Location within Southern Quebec Location within Quebec Location within Canada

Montreal Central Station (French: Gare centrale de Montréal, IATA: YMY) is the major inter-city rail station and a major commuter rail hub in Montreal, Quebec, Canada. Nearly 11 million rail passengers use the station every year, making it the second-busiest train station in Canada, after Toronto Union Station.

The main concourse occupies almost the entire block bounded by De la Gauchetière Street, Robert-Bourassa Boulevard, René Lévesque Boulevard and Mansfield Street in downtown Montreal. Its street address and principal vehicular access are on de La Gauchetière; pedestrian access is assured by numerous links through neighbouring buildings. The station is adorned with art deco bas-relief friezes on its interior and exterior. The station building and associated properties are owned by Cominar REIT as of January 2012. Homburg Invest Inc. (renamed Canmarc in September 2011) was the previous owner, since November 30, 2007. Prior to that, from the station's inception in 1943, it had been owned by Canadian National Railway (CN).

Central Station is at the centre of the Quebec City–Windsor Corridor, the busiest inter-city rail service area in the nation (marketed as the Corridor), which extends from Windsor and Sarnia in the west, through Toronto, Ottawa, and Montreal, to Quebec City in the east. Inter-city trains at Central Station are operated by Via Rail and Amtrak, while commuter rail services are operated by Exo. The station is also a stop on the Réseau express métropolitain, which opened on July 31, 2023. The station is also connected to the Montreal Metro subway system.

Central Station's Via station code is MTRL; its Amtrak code is MTR, and its IATA code is YMY.

== History ==
Central Station opened in 1943, after several years of construction. It stands slightly north of the site of the terminus of the Canadian Northern Railway's Tunnel Terminal, which had originally opened in 1918.

=== Canadian National Railways ===
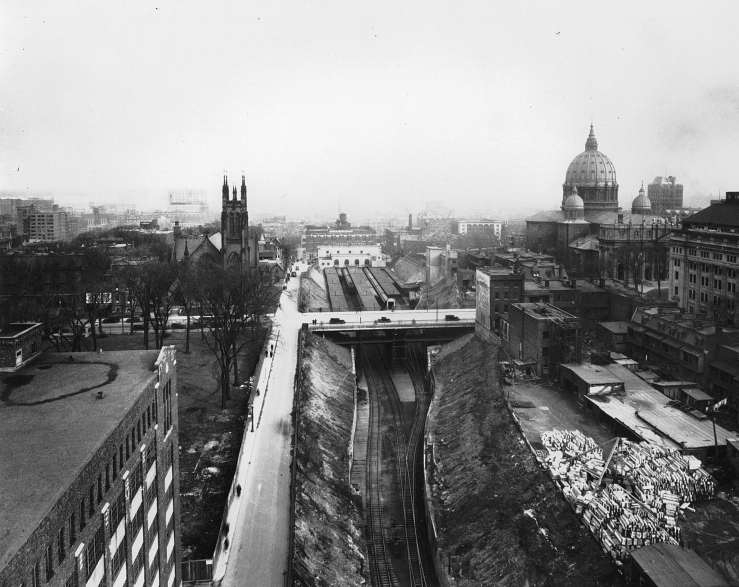
The trench of the Canadian National Railway near Dorchester Boulevard in 1930.

Following the bankruptcy of the Grand Trunk Railway, the Government of the Dominion of Canada decided to consolidate the Grand Trunk Railway with the various Canadian Government Railways to form the Canadian National Railway (CNR). The merger left CNR with a somewhat viable patchwork of different networks.

For much of the first half of the 20th century, CNR found itself in a highly uncomfortable position in Montreal due to the scattering of its terminals. Bonaventure Station was used for routes heading west and south east, the Tunnel Terminal served routes heading north, Moreau Street Station served eastbound routes, and the McGill Street Terminal served the interurban streetcars of the Montreal and Southern Counties Railway. Making matters worse, the various stations were not connected to one another except via long detours. To transfer a train from Bonaventure Station to Tunnel Station it would need to travel to Hawkesbury, Ontario, and to travel from Tunnel Station to Moreau Station it needed to take a detour via Rawdon in the Laurentians.

=== Consolidation and construction ===
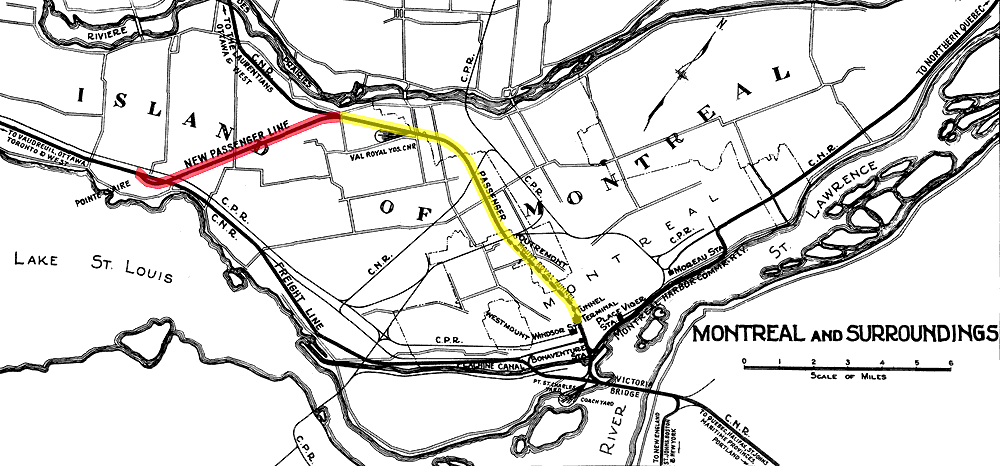
Red shows proposed line to facilitate access to Central Station.

The solution chosen was to take advantage of the Mount Royal Tunnel to bring trains from the north and east through the tunnel to a large electrified central station. Trains from the south and west gained access by a new elevated viaduct. Interurban electric trains, however, remained at McGill Street Terminal until the service was abandoned in 1956.

The opening of a 'central' station was authorized by the Canadian National Montreal Terminals Act, 1929; this saw the closure of former temporary stations operated by CNR predecessors Grand Trunk (Bonaventure Station) and Canadian Northern. The new station plan allowed for the development of air-rights, similar to New York City's two major stations, Grand Central Terminal and Penn Station. The new Central Station would be situated in the block bounded by De la Gauchetière Street to the south, Mansfield Street to the west, Cathcart Street to the north and University Street to the east.

Central Station was designed by John Schofield, architect-in-chief of CNR. Construction started in 1926, but was halted in 1930 as a result of the Great Depression. Construction resumed in 1939, the economy having improved.

=== Opening ===
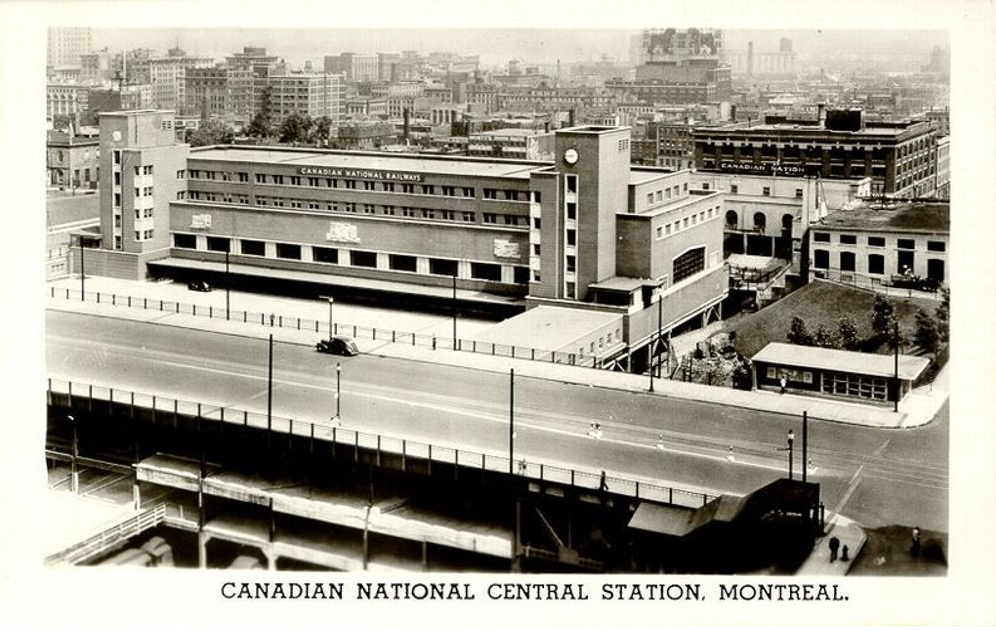
Postcard of Central Station, from about 1943.

The new station finally opened on July 14, 1943, as the first of a series of large-scale urban redevelopment projects undertaken by CNR and the federal government in Downtown Montreal. As opened the station had 16 passenger tracks, numbered 7 to 22; most were terminal tracks with only tracks 13 to 16 running through from the viaduct approach to the tunnel.

=== Consolidation of CN and CP intercity trains ===
Central Station was an important passenger station for CN trains from 1943 until the creation of Via Rail in 1978. Following Via's full absorption of CP's passenger trains in 1978, intercity rail traffic from Windsor Station was slowly redirected to Central Station. The final Via trains switched from Windsor Station to Central Station were the Quebec City trains that operated by way of Trois-Rivières (April 29, 1984). Amtrak's Adirondack was switched to Central Station on January 12, 1986.

=== Modifications to the station ===
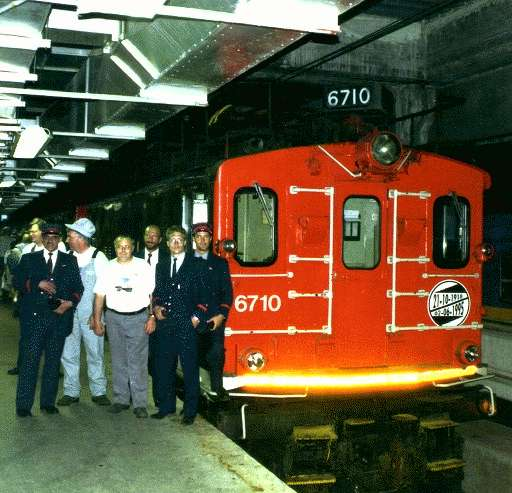
On June 2, 1995, the crew of the last commuter train hauled by a CN Z-1-a electric Bo-Bo #6710 locomotive pose next to their train in Central Station. This boxcab locomotive was the same that had inaugurated the Mount Royal Tunnel, 77 years earlier.

At Central Station's opening, tracks (7, 8, 9, 10, 11 and 12) of the Tunnel Station were used only by trains heading north through the tunnel, and they did not continue south of the station. These tracks were finally connected to the south when the old Tunnel Station was demolished as well as the warehouse located south of De la Gauchetière Street and east of Inspector Street (now Mansfield Street). This also allowed for the construction of the new headquarters of CNR as well as Place Bonaventure. This division is once again in effect following the rebuilding of the Deux-Montagnes line. These tracks are now part of the Two Mountains Subdivision, extending south for a distance of about 1,600 metres (5,250 ft). Under catenary wires, they serve as parking for trains on the Deux-Montagnes line during the day. Since the reopening of the Mont-Saint-Hilaire line, they are also used to park trains from this line.

Tracks 6–16 lead to the tunnel to the north, and lanes 4, 5 and tracks 16 to 23 are in a cul-de-sac to the north (track 16 is provided with a switch just north of the stairs). Tracks 13 to 15 are never used in the northbound direction because of the lack of catenary wires.

One platform (23) is inaccessible to the main concourse, and serves instead as parking for the company cars belonging to upper-level management.

Upon entry into service of the UAC TurboTrain, three tracks (4, 5, 6) were arranged on the west side of the station for a servicing and maintenance facility located there. The workshop, called "Turbo Bay", is still used to maintain light commuter trains as well as the private cars belonging to CN's senior management who use the station. The tracks in the workshop are protected by derails.

Around 1980, the catenary wire was removed from tracks 13, 14, 15 and 16, to allow dome train cars to enter the station.

In 1994–95, the complete reconstruction of the commuter rail Deux-Montagnes Line resulted in tracks 7–12 being re-electrified at 25 kV AC. The original 3000-volt DC catenary was removed from the other tracks.

Until 2019, the platforms of tracks 7 and 8 are now inaccessible from the station, the entrance having been sealed to allow for the development of commercial space, and the tracks now used as parking for trains waiting to be repaired in the "Turbo Bay".

Following the construction of the Réseau Express Métropolitain starting in 2019, tracks 7–12 have been repurposed for the REM Gare Centrale station.

=== Bombing ===
On September 3, 1984, a pipe bomb exploded inside a Central Station locker, killing 3 people and injuring 30 more. The bomb was alleged to have been set by retired American armed forces officer Thomas Bernard Brigham, who claimed to have been protesting Pope John Paul II's visit to Canada.

== Architecture ==
With the design being overseen by CNR's architect-in-chief John Schofield (1883–1971), the architecture of Central Station is modern; it is a mixture of Art Deco and the international style. Its large concourse, designed by John Campbell Merrett (1909–1998), is illuminated by large windows. Originally, the concourse was cluttered by various ticket counters and kiosks, but, over time, they were pushed to the extremities of the room, which left much more space for the passing crowds.

The 14 underground tracks are accessible by seven stairwells, five of which are equipped with escalators.

The east and west interior walls of the station feature two large bas-reliefs depicting Canadian life, arts and industry, designed by Charles Comfort and executed by Sebastiano Aiello. Included in the bas relief are a few of the lyrics of "O Canada", which was only an unofficial national anthem when the station was built. The lyrics are in French on the east side of the station and in English on the west side. Canadian artist Fritz Brandtner created the three large chiselled stone reliefs depicting Mercury, Apollo and Poseidon on the station's north exterior wall. The representations of Mercury and Poseidon measure approximately 2.5 by 4.5 m (8 ft 2 in by 14 ft 9 in). Apollo is larger but visual access is very limited. These were obscured by the 1958 construction of the neighbouring Queen Elizabeth Hotel. It is disputed whether Comfort or Brandtner created the thematic stone medallions depicting water, land and air transportation on the station's west, south and east exterior walls. Stylistically, however, the bas-relief medallions bear a strong resemblance to the frieze by Charles Comfort created for the Toronto Stock Exchange building in 1937.

== Railway operations ==
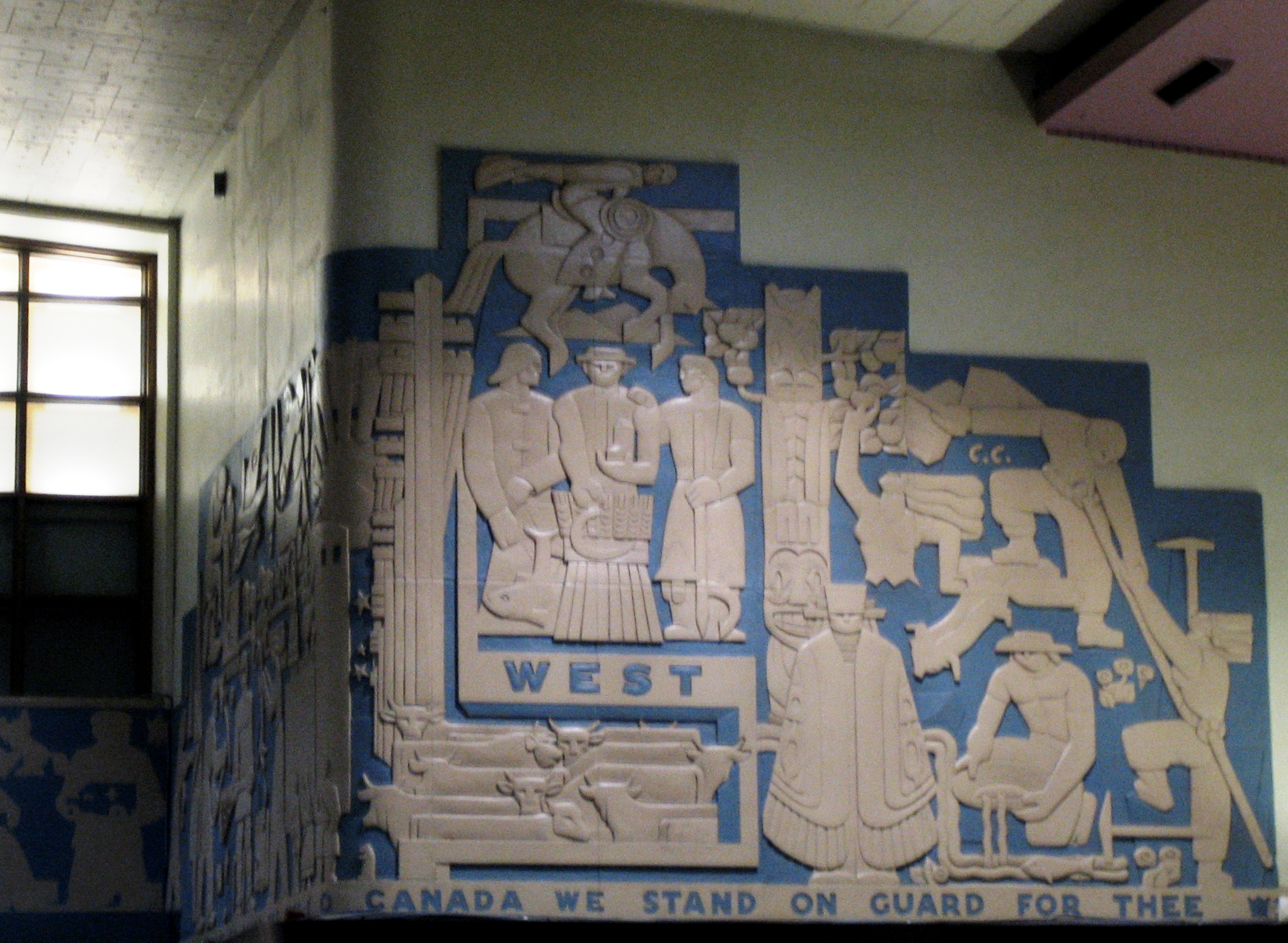
A sample of the bas-relief artwork that adorns the concourse's walls.

Because of its underground urban location, the railway station quickly imposed operational constraints on CNR.

To avoid smoke in the vicinity of the station, the first trains were powered by electric locomotives. The change of traction took place at Bridge Street, 3 kilometres (1.9 mi) south for trains serving the south-east, at Turcot Yards, 6 kilometres (3.7 mi) west for trains serving the west, Val Royal, 14 kilometres (8.7 mi) north for trains running northwest of the junction and 9 kilometres (5.6 mi) north for trains serving the northeast. A fleet of 14 electric locomotives were used for this work.

An elaborate system of signals allowed staff to track the status of the various trains. At the station, as soon as the train was ready to receive passengers, the conductor inserted the key switch in a special switch indicating to staff at the station (ticket checkers) that the train was ready. The movement director at Wellington was also advised via a series of lights that the train was receiving passengers, which then allowed him to establish the route out of the station.

Access to the platforms is controlled by ticket examiners who verify each passenger's ticket. This configuration limits access uniquely to passengers. At the time of departure, after all passengers had descended, the ticket checker would press a button that notified the conductor, through a green light on the platform, that the train could leave. The movement director in Wellington was also advised of the departure by a special light. The final decision of departure was the responsibility of the conductor, until conductors were replaced by a second engineer in the 1990s.

== Urban development ==
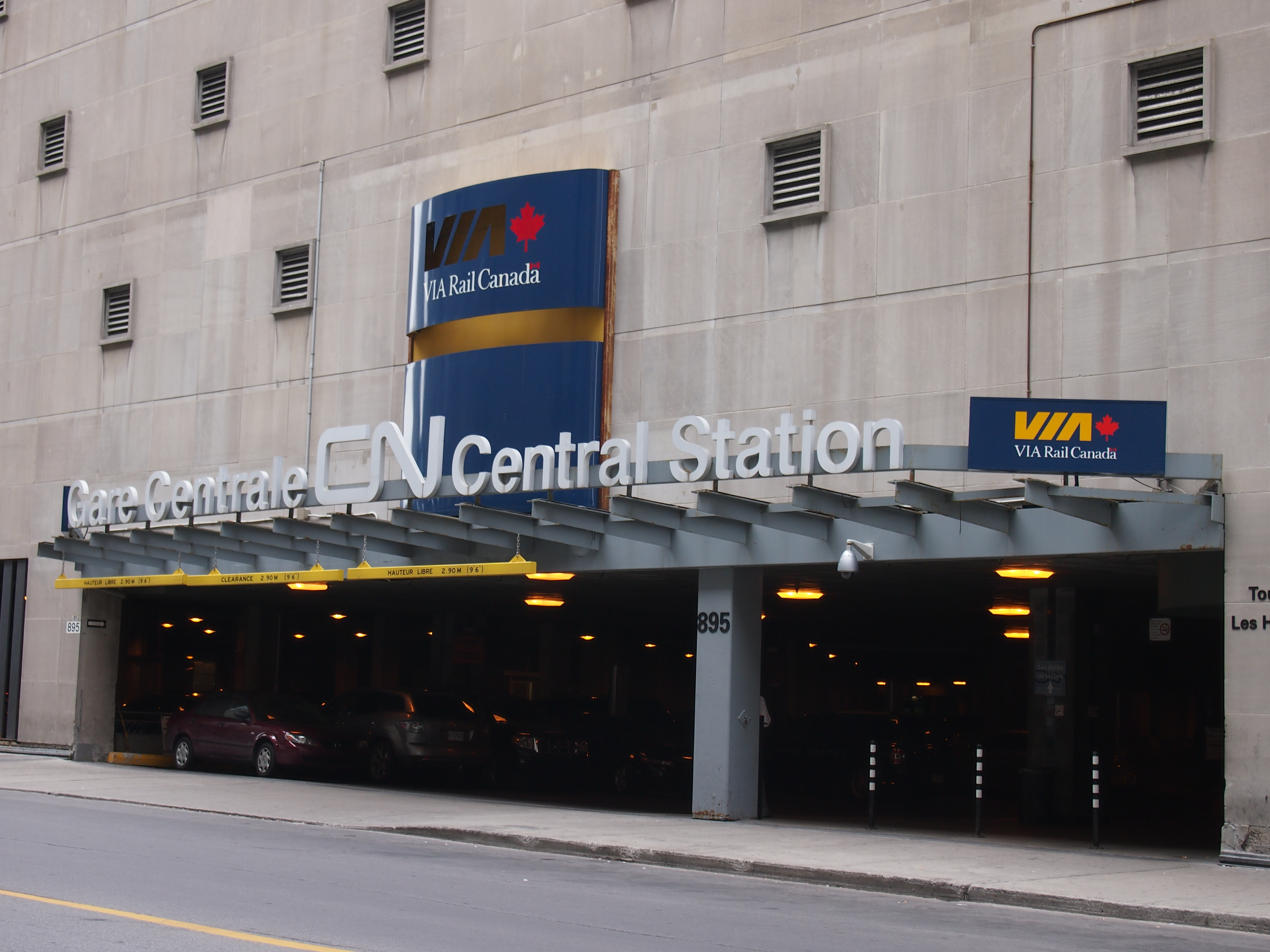
The parking garage bordering de La Gauchetière Street.

Over the years, the empty space around Central Station has gradually developed to the point where the station building itself is hardly visible from the outside.

In 1948, ICAO built its headquarters over the northeast portion of the station along University Street south of Dorchester Street. Then in 1959, the Queen Elizabeth Hotel was built on the western portion, on the corner of Dorchester and Mansfield, which was the first of many major redevelopments in the area.

In 1960, the former Tunnel Station building was demolished to allow for the construction of the new head-office of CNR, and soon after, a large parking garage was built over the southern part of the station. The Terminal Tower of 1966 completely hid the station from Dorchester Boulevard.

Belmont Street, east of the station was extended over the station itself to Mansfield Street. On Belmont is the only visible portion of the exterior of the station, the rest having been attached to the various buildings built over the years.

The north side of Dorchester (now René Lévesque Boulevard) then saw the construction of the complex of Place Ville-Marie, which now includes four skyscrapers whose highest was 45 floors and an underground shopping mall, which was the beginning of the Underground City.

In the mid-1960s, Place Bonaventure was built over the tracks, south of de La Gauchetière Street. In 1966, Central Station and Place Bonaventure were connected underground by the new Bonaventure metro station, named in honour of the demolished Bonaventure railway station.

All of these buildings underwent major renovations over the next 30 years.

== Connecting facilities ==
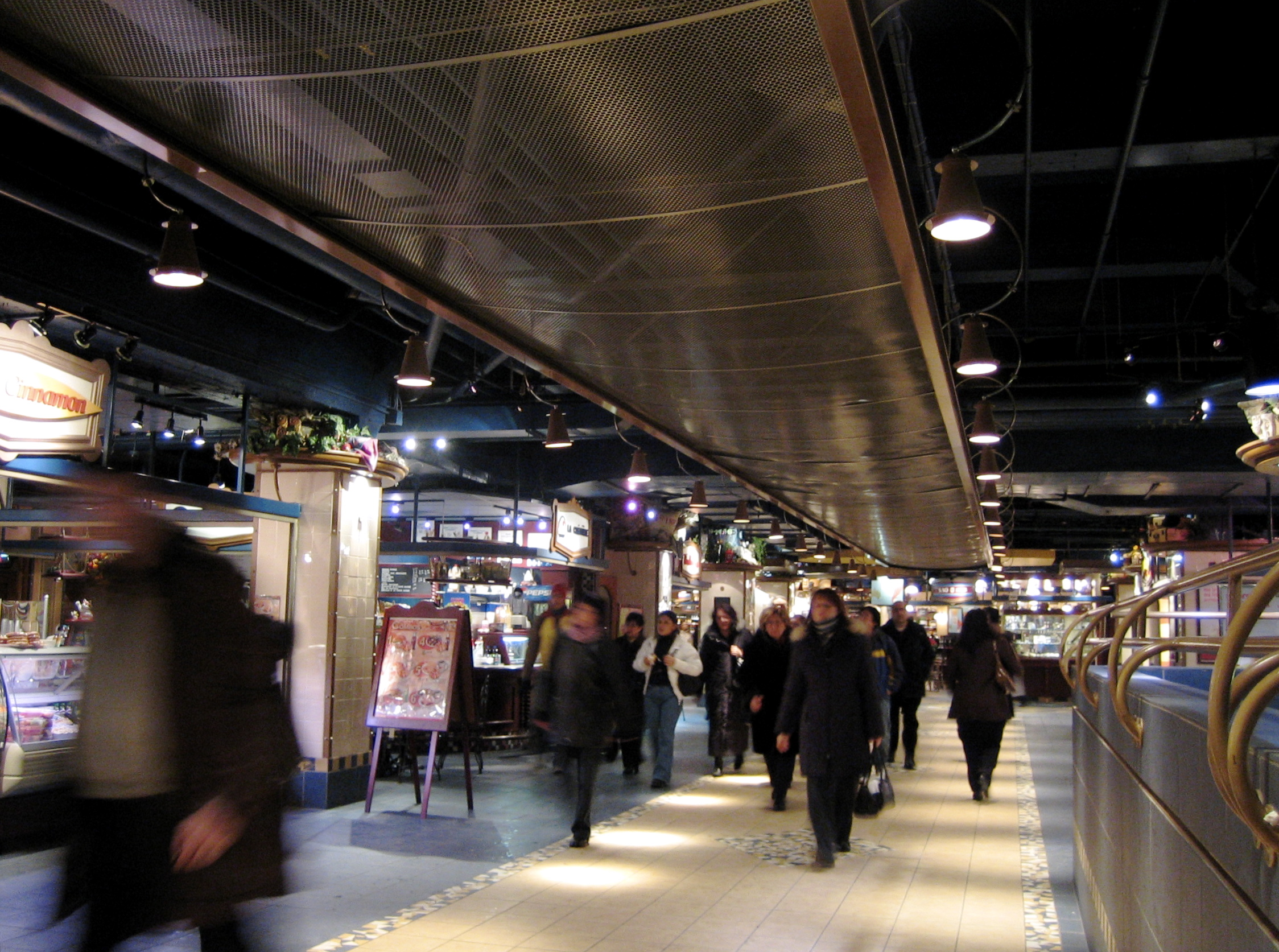
Les Halles de la gare shopping and restaurant complex.

Central Station is located adjacent to CN Headquarters and is an important link in the underground city, with tunnels to Place Ville-Marie, Place Bonaventure, the Queen Elizabeth Hotel, 1000 de La Gauchetière, and the Bonaventure metro station.

It also contains two parking facilities, one of which is a multi-level facility that is located above the station.

=== Les Halles de la Gare ===
Central Station has gradually grown to include Les Halles de la Gare, a shopping and restaurant complex. Real estate pressures have meant that the shopping area would be expanded several times.

While the old ICAO building was undergoing renovations in 1981, (after the relocation of ICAO to Sherbrooke Street), a railway-themed shopping area expanded on the north side of the station. This section was completely destroyed in 1995 during the restoration of the Deux-Montagnes Line, and was replaced by the present Les Halles de la Gare complex.

== U.S. preclearance ==
In May 2012, U.S. Senators Charles Schumer, Kirsten Gillibrand, Patrick Leahy, and Bernie Sanders sent a letter to President Barack Obama urging him to fastrack the approval of a U.S. Customs preclearance facility at the station that will benefit U.S. bound travelers on the Adirondack from having to stop at the railway station located in Rouses Point, New York for immigration and customs checks whenever they cross the Canada–US border. Under the arrangement, the stop in Saint-Lambert would be removed. The agreement will also allow another Amtrak line, the Vermonter, to be extended from its current terminus at St. Albans to Montreal, though this agreement must first be approved by United States Congress and the Parliament of Canada. This would enable direct travel by train from Montreal to Washington, D.C.'s Union Station via Massachusetts and New York City, as well as the potential development of direct service to Boston.

On March 16, 2015, the United States and Canada signed an agreement that would allow for such a facility. Enabling legislation was enacted by the United States on December 16, 2016 as the Promoting Travel, Commerce, and National Security Act of 2016.

== Services ==
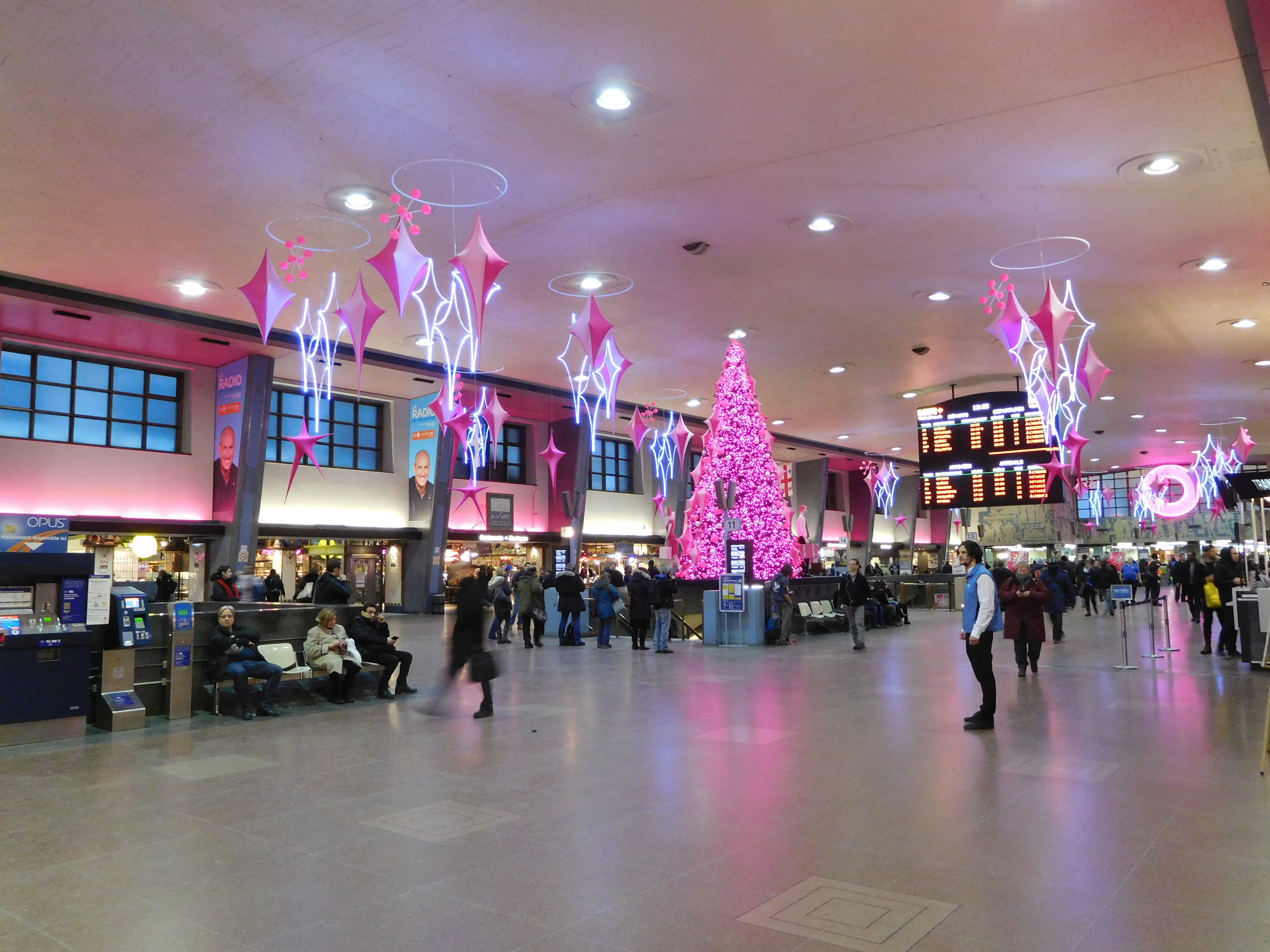
Montreal Central Station, Christmas 2016

=== Via Rail ===
Frequent Corridor services offer multiple-daily departures on the following routes:

- Ottawa-Quebec City to Alexandria, Ottawa, Saint-Lambert, Drummondville, Sainte-Foy and Quebec City
- Toronto-Montreal to Cornwall, Brockville, Kingston, Belleville, Oshawa and Toronto

In addition, the following long distance/rural services are operated several times weekly:

- Montreal–Senneterre train to Shawinigan, La Tuque and Senneterre
- Montreal–Gaspé train to Charny, Rivière-du-Loup, Rimouski, Matapédia, Carleton-sur-Mer, New Carlisle, Chandler, Percé and Gaspé (This service was suspended from August 22, 2013, due to infrastructure problems between Matapédia and Gaspé)
- Ocean to Saint-Lambert, Sainte-Foy, Rivière-du-Loup, Rimouski, Matapédia, Campbellton, Bathurst, Miramichi, Moncton and Halifax
- Montreal–Jonquière train to Shawinigan, Chambord, and Jonquière

=== Amtrak ===
- Adirondack to Saint-Lambert, Plattsburgh, Saratoga Springs, Schenectady, Albany–Rensselaer station, Poughkeepsie, and New York City, as well as intermediate points.

=== Exo ===
- Mont-Saint-Hilaire line (Exo 13)

=== Réseau express métropolitain ===
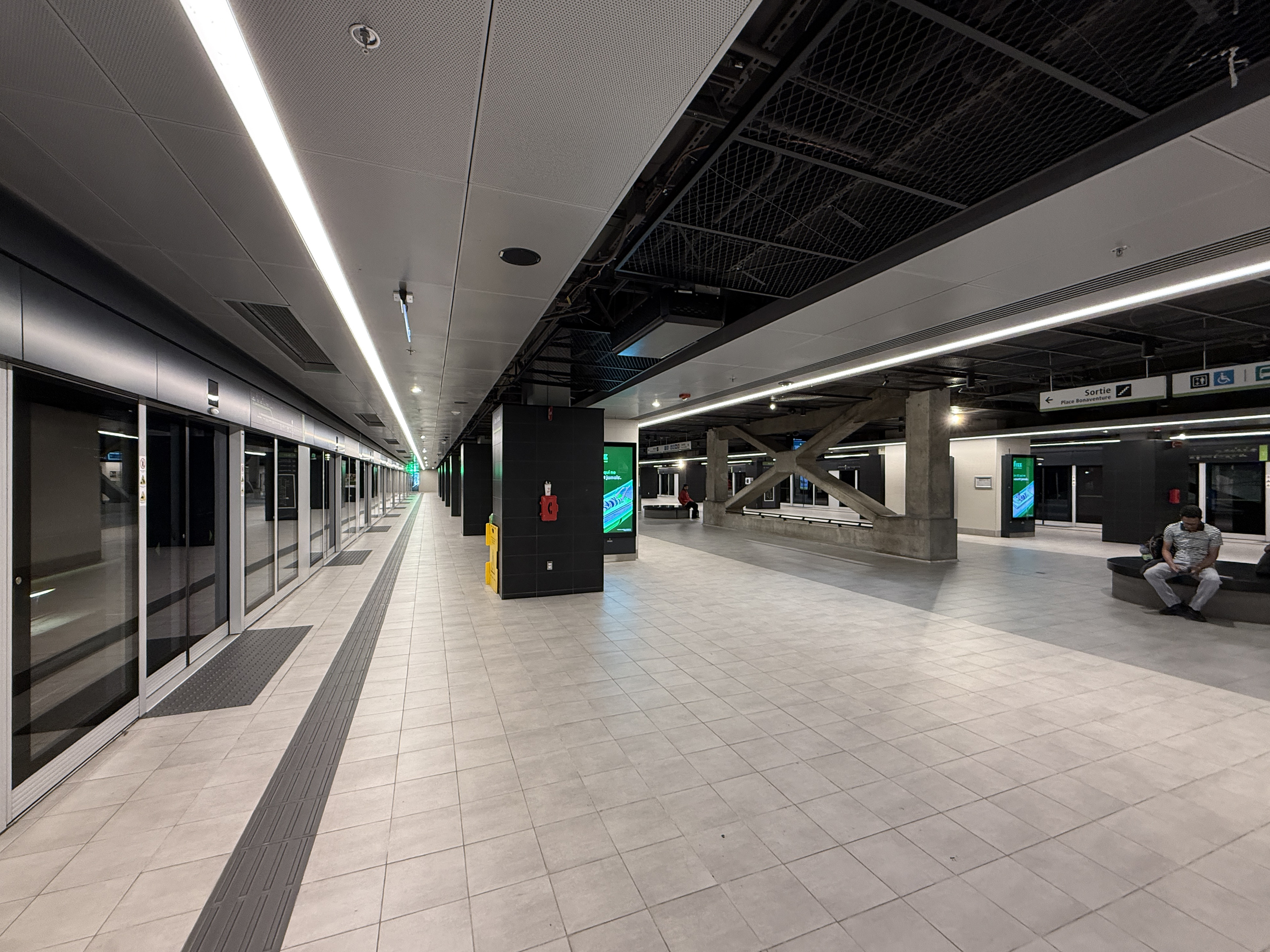
REM platform at Gare Centrale

A separate railway platform was built to the south of the existing platforms for the REM service which connects the South Shore to the North Shore, West Island and Trudeau Airport. Service to the South Shore began 31 July 2023, the North Shore on 17 November 2025, the West Island on 18 May 2026 and Trudeau Airport will open in 2027.

== Public transit connections ==
=== Metro ===
- Bonaventure (Orange Line)
- McGill (Green Line) is three blocks north, by way of the Underground city, which includes passing through Place Ville Marie and the Montreal Eaton Centre

=== STM buses ===
See Bonaventure Metro for connecting bus routes.

=== Other connecting buses ===
- RTL and inter municipal buses
