= Mansfield Street (Montreal) =

Street in Montreal, Canada

- Interactive map of Mansfield Street
- Native name: rue Mansfield (French)
- Length: 1 km (0.62 mi)
- Location: Between Sherbrooke Street and Saint Antoine Street
- Coordinates: 45.501707°N 73.572384°W
- North end: R-138 Sherbrooke Street
- South end: R-136 Ville-Marie Expressway

Construction
- Inauguration: 1845

Mansfield Street (officially in French: rue Mansfield) is a north–south commercial street located in Downtown Montreal, Quebec, Canada. It is situated two blocks from Peel Street and links Sherbrooke Street in the north to Saint-Antoine Street in the south.

== History ==
Constructed around 1845 by James Smith and Duncan Fisher, Mansfield Street was named for William Murray, 1st Earl of Mansfield (1705–1793), a Lord Chief Justice of the King's Bench.

== Points of interest ==
- Central Station
- Queen Elizabeth Hotel
- Place Ville-Marie
- Centre Mont-Royal
