= Petit lac Batiscan =

Lake in Capitale-Nationale, Canada

- Location in Quebec
- Location: Saint-Raymond, Portneuf Regional County Municipality, Capitale-Nationale
- Coordinates: 47.08583°N 72.01805°W
- Lake type: Natural
- Primary inflows: (Clockwise, from the confluence) Discharge from Lake Hamilton, discharge from Lakes Paquet and Égry, discharge from a set of lakes including Lac à Pierre, discharge from Petit lac des Neiges, discharge from an unidentified lake.
- Primary outflows: Petite rivière Batiscan
- Basin countries: Canada
- Max. length: 4.0 km (2.5 mi)
- Max. width: 1.7 km (1.1 mi)
- Surface elevation: 403 m (1,322 ft)

The Petit lac Batiscan (English: Little Batiscan Lake) is a freshwater body in the head zone of the Petite rivière Batiscan, in the territory of the town of Saint-Raymond, in the Portneuf Regional County Municipality, in the administrative region of Capitale-Nationale, in the province of Quebec, in Canada.

The area around Little Batiscan Lake is served by secondary forest roads. Forestry is the main economic activity in the sector; recreational tourism, second.

The surface of Little Batiscan Lake is usually frozen from the beginning of December to the end of March, however the safe circulation on the ice is generally made from mid-December to mid-March.

== Geography ==
The main watersheds neighboring Petit Lac Batiscan are:

- north side: rivière à Pierre, lac à Pierre, Sainte-Anne Ouest River;
- east side: Rouge stream, Sainte-Anne Ouest River, Bras du Nord;
- south side: lac des Soixante Arpents, lac de la Hauteur, Cachée River;
- west side: rivière à Pierre, Blanche River.

Little Batiscan Lake is surrounded by mountains. Its shape resembles a misshapen boot.

The mouth of Petit lac Batiscan is located southeast of the lake, at:

- 4.1 kilometres (2.5 mi) north-east of the confluence of the Little Batiscan river and the Pierre river;
- 21.9 kilometres (13.6 mi) north-east of the confluence of the Pierre river and the Batiscan River;
- 15.2 kilometres (9.4 mi) north-east of the village center of Rivière-à-Pierre.

From the mouth of Little Batiscan Lake, the current descends consecutively on:

- 5.4 kilometres (3.4 mi) to the south, then to the west, the course of the Petite rivière Batiscan;
- 24.5 kilometres (15.2 mi) generally towards the southwest following the course of the rivière à Pierre;
- generally towards the south, the course of the Batiscan River.

== Toponymy ==
The term Batiscan is related to other toponyms of the same family which are tributaries of the Batiscan River. Petit lac Batiscan is located 1.7 kilometres (1.1 mi) southeast of the course of the head zone of the rivière à Pierre which generally flows towards the southwest to flow into the Batiscan River. Its namesake is Batiscan Lake.

The toponym "Petit lac Batiscan" was formalized on December 5, 1968, by the Commission de toponymie du Québec.

== See also ==
- List of lakes of Canada
