= Sirois =

Sirois is a surname. Notable people with the surname include:

- Allan Sirois (born 1975), Canadian ice hockey player
- Anne-Marie Sirois (born 1958), Canadian visual artist, writer and film director
- Bob Sirois (born 1954), Canadian ice hockey player
- Charles Sirois (born 1954), Canadian businessman
- Edward Sirois (1898–1968), American politician and Massachusetts National Guard officer
- Joe Sirois (born 1972), American drummer
- Jonathan Sirois Canadian soccer goalkeeper
- Leon Sirois (born 1935), American racing driver
- Marie Sirois (1865 – 1920), Canadian strongwoman
- Myriam Sirois (born 1975), Canadian actress and voice actress
- Richard Sirois (disambiguation)
  - Rich Sirois (born 1957), Canadian hockey player
  - Richard Z. Sirois (born 1956), Canadian radio personality
- Tyler Sirois (born 1984), American politician

== See also ==
- Sirois Lake, a freshwater body of the Mauvaise River watershed, in Quebec, Canada
- Sirois hearing, a legal hearing
