= Sirois Lake =

Lake in Saint-Raymond, Quebec, Canada

- Location in Quebec
- Location: Saint-Raymond, Portneuf Regional County Municipality, Capitale-Nationale
- Coordinates: 46.99889°N 71.89417°W
- Lake type: Natural
- Primary outflows: Mauvaise River
- Basin countries: Canada
- Max. length: 2.4 km (1.5 mi)
- Max. width: 0.39 km (0.24 mi)
- Surface elevation: 475 m (1,558 ft)

The lac Sirois (English: Lake Sirois) is a freshwater body from the watershed of the Mauvaise River, in the territory of the town of Saint-Raymond, in the Portneuf Regional County Municipality, in the administrative region of Capitale-Nationale, in the province of Quebec, in Canada.

The area around the lake is served by secondary forest roads. Forestry is the main economic activity in the sector; recreational tourism, second.

The surface of Lake Sirois is usually frozen from the beginning of December to the end of March, however the safe circulation on the ice is generally made from mid-December to mid-March.

== Geography ==
The main watersheds near Lake Sirois are:

- north side: Lac du Milieu, Bras du Nord, Delaney stream;
- east side: Bras du Nord;
- south side: Mauvaise River, lake Dubut;
- west side: Mauvaise river, lac des Soixante Arpents.

Lac Sirois has three parts which are respectively separated by peninsulas attached to the east shore of the lake:

- the main part (length of 1.4 kilometres (0.87 mi)) located on the north side, which receives on the east side the outlet of Lac Mai and Lac du Milieu;
- the central part (length of 0.4 kilometres (0.25 mi)) without any tributary;
- the southern part (length of 0.5 kilometres (0.31 mi)) which receives the discharge (coming from the northeast) of Sec Lake.

The mouth of Lac Sirois is located northeast of the lake, either:

- 3.7 kilometres (2.3 mi) north of the confluence of the outlet of Lake Sirois and the Bad River;
- 8.4 kilometres (5.2 mi) north-west of the confluence of the Bad river and the Bras du Nord;
- 14.6 kilometres (9.1 mi) north-west of the confluence of the Bras du Nord and the Sainte-Anne River;
- 13.6 kilometres (8.5 mi) north of the village center of Saint-Léonard-de-Portneuf.

From the mouth of Lake Sirois, the current drops consecutively on:

- 5.3 kilometres (3.3 mi) the outlet of Lake Sirois, first towards the west, then the south in particular by crossing Lake Joachim;
- 12.8 kilometres (8.0 mi) towards the south-east, the course of the Mauvaise River;
- 11.7 kilometres (7.3 mi) generally towards the south the course of the Bras du Nord;
- 76.0 kilometres (47.2 mi) generally south, the course of the Sainte-Anne River.

== Toponymy ==
The term "Sirois" is a family name of French origin.

The toponym "Lac Sirois" was formalized on December 5, 1968, by the Commission de toponymie du Québec.

== See also ==
- List of lakes of Canada
