= Talayarde North-East River =

Talayarde North-East River Rivière Talayarde Nord-Est
- Location within Quebec

Location
- Country: Canada
- Province: Quebec
- Region: Capitale-Nationale
- Regional County Municipality: Portneuf Regional County Municipality
- Municipality: Saint-Raymond

Physical characteristics
- Source: Bienville Lake
  - location: Saint-Raymond
  - coordinates: 47.10340°N 71.71918°W
  - elevation: 599 m (1,965 ft)
- Mouth: Talayarde River
  - location: Saint-Raymond
  - coordinates: 47.01083°N 71.73583°W
  - elevation: 220 m (720 ft)
- Length: 13.9 km (8.6 mi)

Basin features
- Tributaries
  - left: (Upward from the mouth) Unidentified stream, unidentified stream, outlet of Lac Talayarde du Sud, unidentified stream, unidentified stream.
  - right: (Upward from the mouth) Unidentified stream, discharge from an unidentified lake, unidentified stream (via Lac Dufresne), discharge from an unidentified lake.

The Talayarde North East River is a tributary of the Talayarde River flowing in the administrative region of Capitale-Nationale, at Quebec, in Canada. The course of the river crosses the municipality of Saint-Gabriel-de-Valcartier (MRC La Jacques-Cartier Regional County Municipality) and the city of Saint-Raymond, in the Portneuf Regional County Municipality).

The valley of the Talayarde North-East river is mainly served by the forest road R0355 which goes up north passing in the upper part of the west side of the valley and from the east side in the lower part. Some secondary roads serve the territory for the needs of forestry and recreational tourism activities.

The surface of the Northeast Talayarde River (except the rapids areas) is generally frozen from the beginning of December to the end of March, but the safe circulation on the ice is generally made from the end of December to the beginning of March. The water level of the river varies with the seasons and the precipitation; the spring flood occurs in March or April.

== Geography ==
The main hydrographic slopes neighboring the Talayarde North-East river are:

- north side: Bienville lake, Talayarde River, Sainte-Anne River;
- east side: Pimbina stream, Sainte-Anne River;
- south side: Talayarde River, Sainte-Anne River, Verte River;
- west side: Talayarde River, Bras du Nord, Écartée River.

The Talayarde North-East River rises at the mouth of Lake Bienville (length: 2.0 kilometres (1.2 mi); altitude: 599 metres (1,965 ft)) located in the unorganized territory of Lac-Blanc. From this mouth, the Talayarde North-East river flows over 13.9 kilometres (8.6 mi) generally towards the south in the forest zone, with a drop of 379 metres (1,243 ft), according to the following segments:

- 1.2 kilometres (0.75 mi) south-west, to a stream (coming from the north);
- 4.3 kilometres (2.7 mi) to the south in a deep valley, in particular by crossing a series of rapids and crossing Lake Dufresne (length: 0.4 kilometres (0.25 mi); altitude: 422 metres (1,385 ft)), to its mouth;
- 2.2 kilometres (1.4 mi) to the east, in a deep valley crossing a series of rapids at the end of the segment, until discharge (coming from the north) from Lac Talayarde du Sud;
- 6.2 kilometres (3.9 mi) towards the south by crossing two series of rapids, and forming two hooks towards the east, until its mouth.

The Talayarde North-East River flows on the northeast bank of the Talayarde River. This confluence is located at:

- 1.2 kilometres (0.75 mi) west of the course of the Sainte-Anne River;
- 15.0 kilometres (9.3 mi) north of downtown Saint-Raymond;
- 16.9 kilometres (10.5 mi) north of the village center of Lac-Sept-Îles;
- 36.1 kilometres (22.4 mi) north-west of the north-west bank of the Saint-Laurent River.

From this confluence, the current descends on 2.2 kilometres (1.4 mi) towards the south the course of the Talayarde River, then on 97.9 kilometres (60.8 mi) generally towards the south and the southwest in following the course of the Sainte-Anne River, to the northwest shore of the St. Lawrence River.

== Toponymy ==
The toponym "Rivière Talayarde Nord-Est" was formalized on December 5, 1968, at the Place Names Bank of the Commission de toponymie du Québec.

== See also ==
- List of rivers of Quebec

== Bibliography ==
- CAPSA (2014). Plans directeurs de l'eau des secteurs d'intervention de la zone de gestion de la CAPSA: Sainte-Anne, Portneuf et La Chevrotière (Water master plans of the intervention sectors of the CAPSA management area: Sainte-Anne, Portneuf and La Chevrotière) (PDF) (in French). Quebec: CAPSA. p. 691. Archived from the original (PDF) on 2019-02-14.
