= Talayarde =

Talayarde may refer to:

- Talayarde River, a tributary of the Sainte-Anne river in Quebec, Canada
- Talayarde North-East River, a tributary of the Talayarde River in Quebec, Canada
