= Lac des Soixante Arpents =

- Location in Quebec
- Location: Saint-Raymond, Portneuf Regional County Municipality, Capitale-Nationale
- Coordinates: 46.99889°N 71.89417°W
- Lake type: Natural
- Primary inflows: Mauvaise River
- Primary outflows: Mauvaise River
- Basin countries: Canada
- Max. length: 4.0 km (2.5 mi)
- Max. width: 0.5 km (0.31 mi)
- Surface elevation: 403 m (1,322 ft)

The lac des Soixante Arpents is a fresh body of water crossed by the Mauvaise River, in the territory of the town of Saint-Raymond, in the Portneuf Regional County Municipality, in the administrative region of Capitale-Nationale, in the province from Quebec, in Canada.

The area around Lac des Soixante Arpents is served by secondary forest roads. Forestry is the main economic activity in the sector; recreational tourism, second.

The surface of Lac des Soixante Arpents is usually frozen from the beginning of December to the end of March, however the safe circulation on the ice is generally made from mid-December to mid-March.

== Geography ==
The main watersheds adjacent to Lac des Sixante Arpents are:

- north side: Petit lac Alexandre, Lac des Îles, Petit lac Batiscan, Ruisseau Delaney;
- east side: Mauvaise River, Bras du Nord;
- south side: Cachée River;
- west side: Portage Lake, Height Lake.

The lake of the Soixante Arpents is made in all length, resulting from the widening of the bad river because of the dam at the mouth of the lake. This lake has a narrow bay stretching over 0.7 kilometres (0.43 mi) to the north to accommodate the outlet (coming from the north) of Petit lac Alexandre. It also has another bay stretching to the south. The eastern part of the lake is particularly deep between the mountains.

The mouth of Lac des Soixante Arpents is located northeast of the lake, either:

- 8.7 kilometres (5.4 mi) north-west of the confluence of the Bad river and the Bras du Nord;
- 14.9 kilometres (9.3 mi) north-west of the confluence of the Bras du Nord and the Sainte-Anne River;
- 11.9 kilometres (7.4 mi) north of the village center of Saint-Léonard-de-Portneuf.

From the mouth of the lake of the Soixante Arpents, the current descends consecutively on:

- 14.9 kilometres (9.3 mi) towards the south-east, the course of the Mauvaise River;
- 11.7 kilometres (7.3 mi) generally towards the south the course of the Bras du Nord;
- 76.0 kilometres (47.2 mi) generally south, the course of the Sainte-Anne River.

== Toponymy ==
The toponym "lac des Soxante Arpents" was formalized on December 5, 1968, by the Commission de toponymie du Québec.

== See also ==
- La Jacques-Cartier Regional County Municipality
- List of lakes of Canada

== Bibliography ==
- Corporation d’aménagement et de protection de la Sainte-Anne (2006), Plan directeur de l’eau du bassin versant de la rivière Sainte-Anne (PDF)
