= Rivière de la Roche Plate =

- Location within Quebec

Location
- Country: Canada
- Province: Quebec
- Region: Capitale-Nationale
- Regional County Municipality: Portneuf Regional County Municipality
- Municipality: Saint-Raymond

Physical characteristics
- Source: Lac du Partage
  - location: Saint-Raymond
  - coordinates: 47.10468°N 71.79607°W
  - elevation: 647 m (2,123 ft)
- Mouth: Bras du Nord
  - location: Saint-Raymond
  - coordinates: 47.03806°N 71.85389°W
  - elevation: 190 m (620 ft)
- Length: 9.7 km (6.0 mi)

Basin features
- Tributaries
  - left: (Upward from the mouth) Discharge from an unidentified small lake, discharge from an unidentified small lake.
  - right: (Upward from the mouth) Stream draining a marsh area including Lac Lafrance, outlet of Lac Bédard and Petit Lac Bédard, outlet of a small unidentified lake.

The rivière de la Roche Plate (English: flat rock river) is a river in Canada. It is a tributary of the Bras du Nord, flowing in the territory of the municipality of Saint-Raymond, in the MRC Portneuf Regional County Municipality, in the administrative region of Capitale-Nationale, in Quebec. The upper part of this river flows into the western part of the Laurentides Wildlife Reserve.

The lower part of the Roche Plate river valley is mainly served by the rang Saguenay road which first goes up to the north and branches off to the west to serve the north shore of the Bras du Nord including the hamlet Pine Lake. Another secondary forest road goes up this small valley.

Forestry is the main economic activity in this sector; recreotourism activities, second.

The surface of the Roche Plate River (except the rapids) is generally frozen from the beginning of December to the end of March, but the safe circulation on the ice is generally made from the end of December to the beginning of March. The water level of the river varies with the seasons and the precipitation; the spring flood occurs in March or April.

== Geography ==
The main hydrographic slopes neighboring the Roche Plate river are:

- north side: Neilson River, Couat Lake, Couat Creek, Talayarde River;
- east side: Talayarde river;
- south side: Bras du Nord;
- west side: Bras du Nord, Neilson River.

The Roche Plate river takes its source from a small unidentified forest lake (length: 0.23 kilometres (0.14 mi); altitude: 647 metres (2,123 ft)). This mouth of the lake is located 8.6 kilometres (5.3 mi) north of the mouth of the Roche Plate river; 24.6 kilometres (15.3 mi) north of the mouth of the Bras du Nord; 68.8 kilometres (42.8 mi) north of the mouth of the Sainte-Anne River.

The Roche Plate river flows on 9.7 kilometres (6.0 mi) to the southwest relatively straight in the municipality of Saint-Raymond, with a drop of 457 metres (1,499 ft). This watercourse descends entirely in a small valley in a forest environment according to the following segments:

- 3.3 kilometres (2.1 mi) to the south, in particular by crossing a small unidentified lake, then crossing on 0.3 kilometres (0.19 mi) flat lake (altitude: 623 metres (2,044 ft)), to the outlet (coming from the west) of Lac Bédard and Petit lac Bédard;
- 4.3 kilometres (2.7 mi) to the south showing a drop of 380 metres (1,250 ft) down the mountain, to a stream (coming from the west);
- 2.1 kilometres (1.3 mi) south in a small valley, to its mouth.

It flows upstream of a bend in the North Arm, that is to say 3.4 kilometres (2.1 mi) upstream of the hamlet Pine Lake.

From this confluence, the current descends the course of the Bras du Nord on 28.1 kilometres (17.5 mi) to the south, then follows the course of the Sainte-Anne river on 76 kilometres (47 mi) generally south-west, to the north-west bank of the St. Lawrence River.

== Toponymy ==
The toponym "Rivière de la Roche Plate" was formalized on December 5, 1968, at the Place Names Bank of the Commission de toponymie du Québec.

== See also ==
- List of rivers of Quebec

== Bibliography ==
- CAPSA (2014). Plans directeurs de l'eau des secteurs d'intervention de la zone de gestion de la CAPSA: Sainte-Anne, Portneuf et La Chevrotière (English: Water master plans of the intervention sectors of the CAPSA management area: Sainte-Anne, Portneuf and La Chevrotière) (PDF) (in French). Quebec: CAPSA. p. 691. Archived from the original (PDF) on 2019-02-14.
