= Petite rivière Batiscan =

- Location within Quebec

Location
- Country: Canada
- Province: Quebec
- Region: Capitale-Nationale
- Regional County Municipality: Portneuf Regional County Municipality
- Unorganized territory and a municipality: Linton and Rivière-à-Pierre

Physical characteristics
- Source: Lac à Pierre
  - location: Linton, Canton de Tonti
  - coordinates: 47.141912°N 71.985845°W
  - elevation: 464
- Mouth: Rivière à Pierre
  - location: Rivière-à-Pierre
  - coordinates: 47.0666543°N 72.080855°W
  - elevation: 289 km (180 mi)
- Length: 13.7 km (8.5 mi)

Basin features
- Tributaries
  - left: (Upward from the mouth) Lac des Bois outlet, Levier lake outlet, Passa lake outlet.
  - right: (Upward from the mouth) Lake Cordon outlet, Lac Égry outlet, Walter Lake outlet.

The Petite rivière Batiscan is a tributary of the east bank of the rivière à Pierre, flowing in the unorganized territories of Linton (township of Tonty), in Saint-Raymond (township of Roquemont) and in the municipality of Rivière-à-Pierre (township of Bois), in the Portneuf Regional County Municipality, in the administrative region of Capitale-Nationale, in the province of Quebec, in Canada.

The course of the Little Batiscan River flows on the northeast side of the Batiscan River and on the northeast side of the St. Lawrence River. This river is part of the hydrographic side of the Batiscan river which generally winds south to the north shore of the St. Lawrence River.

The course of the “Little Batiscan River” descends entirely into the forest zone. The river surface is generally frozen from mid-December until the end of March.

Since the mid-19th century, forestry has been the predominant activity of the Little Batiscan River watershed.

== Geography ==
The Little Batiscan River has its source in a forest area, at the mouth of Lac à Pierre (length: 1.8 kilometres (1.1 mi); altitude: 464 metres (1,522 ft)). The mouth of this lake is located 30.6 kilometres (19.0 mi) to the northwest of the center of the village of Saint-Raymond, 26.7 kilometres (16.6 mi) to the northeast of the confluence of the rivière à Pierre and 51.3 kilometres (31.9 mi) north of the north bank of the St. Lawrence River, at the height of Portneuf. From its source, the “Little Batiscan River” flows over 13.7 kilometres (8.5 mi), according to the following segments:

- 4.6 kilometres (2.9 mi) south-west to the north shore of Petit lac Batiscan;
- 3.7 kilometres (2.3 mi) towards the Southwest crossing the western part of Little Batiscan Lake (length: 5.2 kilometres (3.2 mi); altitude: 406 metres (1,332 ft)), to the mouth located to the south;
- 0.3 kilometres (0.19 mi) south-west to the limit of the Portneuf Wildlife Reserve;
- 2.1 kilometres (1.3 mi) to the Southwest, crossing Lake Parke (length: 1.2 kilometres (0.75 mi); altitude: 306 metres (1,004 ft)) over its full length up to its mouth which corresponds to the limit of the canton of Roquemont;
- 1.7 kilometres (1.1 mi) Southwest in the Roquemont canton of Saint-Raymond, then in Rivière-à-Pierre, crossing Lac du Coin (length: 1.4 kilometres (0.87 mi); altitude: 359 metres (1,178 ft)) over its full length, to its mouth;
- 1.3 kilometres (0.81 mi) south-west, to the confluence of the river.

The Little Batiscan River flows onto the east bank of the Batiscan River in the municipality of Rivière-à-Pierre, in the Portneuf Wildlife Reserve.

The confluence of the "Little Batiscan River" is located at:

- 10.4 kilometres (6.5 mi) North-East of the center of the village of Rivière-à-Pierre;
- 16.6 kilometres (10.3 mi) North-East of the confluence of the rivière à Pierre;
- 25.3 kilometres (15.7 mi) North-West of the center of the village of Saint-Raymond;
- 45.3 kilometres (28.1 mi) north of the north shore of the St. Lawrence River.

== Toponymy ==
The toponym "Petite rivière Batiscan" was formalized on December 5, 1968, at the Commission de toponymie du Québec.

== See also ==
- List of rivers of Quebec
