= Le Gardeur =

Le Gardeur may refer to:

== Persons ==
- Pierre Legardeur de Repentigny (admiral), sieur of Repentigny, born in 1600 in Thury-Harcourt in Normandy and died in 1648, is general of the fleet and director of embarkations for New France.
- Jean-Paul Le Gardeur, sieur de Repentigny, born in Ville-Marie on 4 October 1661 and died in 1738, was an explorer and soldier of New France, serving of the King of France.
- Jacques Legardeur de Saint-Pierre (21 October 1701 — 8 September 1755) is a military officer who took part in various expeditions in North America on behalf of the King of France.
- Augustin le Gardeur de Courtemanche born on 16 December 1663 in the city of Quebec and died on 29 June 1717 in Labrador, is a commander from the Labrador coast and ambassador from New France.
- Armand Le Gardeur de Tilly, born in Rochefort on 14 January 1733 and died at Domaine de La Salle in Champagne, on 1 January 1812, was a French amiral.

== Place names ==
=== Canada ===
- Le Gardeur (township), Côte-Nord-du-Golfe-du-Saint-Laurent (Municipality), MRC Le Golfe-du-Saint-Laurent Regional County Municipality, Côte-Nord, Quebec
- Le Gardeur, Quebec, a sector of Repentigny (City), MRC L'Assomption Regional County Municipality, Lanaudière, Quebec
- Lac Le Gardeur (Nord-du-Québec), Eeyou Istchee Baie-James (municipality) (Municipality), Nord-du-Quebec, Quebec
- Le Gardeur Lake (Lac-Croche), Lac-Croche (Unorganized territory), MRC La Jacques-Cartier Regional County Municipality, Capitale-Nationale, Quebec
- Parc Le Gardeur, public park of Repentigny (City), MRC L'Assomption Regional County Municipality, Lanaudière, Quebec.
- Le Gardeur Bridge, Montreal (City) Park, Quebec
