= Écartée River =

Écartée River Rivière Écartée
- Location within Quebec

Location
- Country: Canada
- Province: Quebec
- Region: Capitale-Nationale
- Regional County Municipality: Portneuf Regional County Municipality
- Municipality: Saint-Raymond

Physical characteristics
- Source: Unidentified Lake
  - location: Saint-Raymond
  - coordinates: 47.01916°N 71.80538°W
  - elevation: 390 m (1,280 ft)
- Mouth: Bras du Nord
  - location: Saint-Raymond
  - coordinates: 47.0125°N 71.84194°W
  - elevation: 184 m (604 ft)
- Length: 3.2 km (2.0 mi)

Basin features
- Tributaries
  - left: (Upward from the mouth) discharge from an unidentified small lake.
  - right: (Upward from the mouth) discharge from an unidentified small lake, discharge from five unidentified small lakes.

The Rivière Écartée (English: Spread River) is a tributary of the Bras du Nord, flowing in the territory of the municipality of Saint-Raymond, in the Portneuf Regional County Municipality, in the administrative region of Capitale-Nationale, in Quebec, Canada.

The lower part of the Écartée river valley is mainly served by the rang Saguenay road which first goes north and branches west to serve the north shore of the Bras du Nord including the hamlet Pine Lake. Another secondary forest road goes up this small valley.

Forestry is the main economic activity in this sector; recreotourism activities, second.

The Spread area (except rapids) is generally frozen from early December to late March, but safe movement on the ice is generally from late December to early March. The water level of the river varies with the seasons and the precipitation; the spring flood occurs in March or April.

== Geography ==
The main hydrographic slopes neighboring the Écartée river are:

- north side: lac de la Bible, lac Couat, Talayarde River;
- east side: Talayarde river;
- south side: Bras du Nord;
- west side: Bras du Nord, rivière de la Roche Plate.

The Écartée river takes its source from a small unidentified forest lake (length: 0.23 kilometres (0.14 mi); altitude: 390 metres (1,280 ft)). This mouth of the lake is located 2.9 kilometres (1.8 mi) northwest of the mouth of the Écartée river; 15.7 kilometres (9.8 mi) north of the mouth of the Bras du Nord; 60 kilometres (37 mi) north of the mouth of the Sainte-Anne River.

The Écartée river flows for 3.2 kilometres (2.0 mi) to the southwest by rolling down a mountainside in the municipality of Saint-Raymond, with a drop in level of 206 metres (676 ft). This watercourse descends entirely in a small valley in a forest environment according to the following segments:

- 2.0 kilometres (1.2 mi) towards the south-west, bending towards the west and descending on 170 metres (560 ft), until the discharge (coming from the north) of five small lakes not identified;
- 0.6 kilometres (0.37 mi) south-west, up to a mountain stream (coming from the north-west);
- 0.6 kilometres (0.37 mi) to the southwest in a small plain where a golf club is located, until its mouth.

It flows upstream from a bend in the Bras du Nord, ie 3.3 kilometres (2.1 mi) west of the Verte River and 6.5 kilometres (4.0 mi) west of the Sainte-Anne River.

From this confluence, the current descends the course of the Bras du Nord on 17.6 kilometres (10.9 mi) to the south, then follows the course of the Sainte-Anne river on 76 kilometres (47 mi) generally south-west, to the north-west bank of the St. Lawrence River.

== Toponymy ==
The toponym "Rivière Écartée" was registered on December 5, 1968 at the Place Names Bank of the Commission de toponymie du Québec.

== See also ==
- Laurentides Wildlife Reserve
- Saint-Raymond
- Portneuf Regional County Municipality
- Capitale-Nationale
- Bras du Nord
- Sainte-Anne River (Mauricie)
- Zec Batiscan-Neilson
- List of rivers of Quebec
