= Batiscan (disambiguation) =

Batiscan was a chief of the Algonquin people in French Canada in the early 17th century.

Batiscan may also refer to:

- Batiscanie, an area corresponding to the watershed of Batiscan River, located on the north shore of St. Lawrence river, in the province of Quebec, in Canada
- Batiscan River, a tributary of the St. Lawrence River in Upper Mauricie, Quebec, Canada
- Lordship of Batiscan, a colonial land grant located on the north shore of St. Lawrence river
- Batiscan, Quebec, a municipality in Mauricie, Quebec, Canada
  - Saint-François-Xavier-de-Batiscan, a Roman Catholic parish with the same territory as the municipality of Batiscan, Quebec
- Batiscan River Park, a regional park of the Lower Batiscanie, Quebec, Canada
- Petit lac Batiscan, a freshwater body of the head zone of the Petite rivière Batiscan, in Quebec, Canada

== See also ==
- Sainte-Geneviève-de-Batiscan, Quebec, a Canadian parish municipality of Quebec located in the regional county municipality (RCM) Les Chenaux
