= Neilson Township =

Coordinates: 47°15′N 71°55′W

The Neilson Township is located in the unorganized territory of Lac-Blanc in Portneuf Regional County Municipality, in the administrative region of the Capitale-Nationale, in Quebec, in Canada.

== Geography ==
Located on the north shore of Saint Lawrence River, about fifty miles northwest of Quebec City, the territory of the township is irregularly shaped. It is an extension of the lordship Saint-Gabriel and fief Hubert. This township is part of Portneuf Regional County Municipality. This township is crossed by the Neilson River (Portneuf) and several small streams. The main water bodies are Aaron and Picard lakes.

== Toponymy ==
Adopted around 1916, the name “Canton Neilson” (Neilson Township) honors John Neilson (1776-1848). For his work in public life, he contributed greatly to the development of the region since the early nineteenth century. Originally from Scotland, he came to live with his brother Samuel in Quebec City, who was acquired from the Quebec Gazette. In 1793, John inherited the newspaper and printing. Upon reaching his majority in 1796, he became editor-owner of this weekly paper. In 1816 Neilson helped recruit European settlers, mostly Irish, and encouraged them to settle in neighboring lordships and township in an area which later became Valcartier. John Neilson was elected several times as member of Comté de Québec (Quebec County). He completed his final term as a member from 1842 to 1844 in the Parliament of the Province of Canada.

The name "Canton Neilson" (Neilson Township) was recorded on December 5, 1968, at the Bank of place names in Commission de toponymie du Québec (Geographical Names Board of Québec).

== See also ==
- Township (Quebec)
- Saint-Raymond, Quebec
- Sainte-Anne River
- Zec Batiscan-Neilson
