= Verte River (Sainte-Anne River tributary) =

River in Quebec

Verte River Rivière Verte
- Location within Quebec

Location
- Country: Canada
- Province: Quebec
- Region: Capitale-Nationale
- Regional County Municipality: Portneuf Regional County Municipality
- Municipality: Saint-Raymond

Physical characteristics
- Source: Lavinia Lake
  - location: Saint-Raymond
  - coordinates: 47.02149°N 71.78870°W
  - elevation: 387 m (1,270 ft)
- Mouth: Talayarde River
  - location: Saint-Raymond
  - coordinates: 46.94917°N 71.79833°W
  - elevation: 159 m (522 ft)
- Length: 7.4 km (4.6 mi)

Basin features
- Tributaries
  - left: (Upward from the mouth) discharge from an unidentified lake, discharge from four small unidentified lakes, discharge from eight small unidentified lakes.
  - right: (Upward from the mouth) discharge from two small unidentified lakes, unidentified mountain stream.

The Rivière Verte (English: Green River) is a tributary of the Sainte-Anne River flowing in the town of Saint-Raymond, in the Portneuf Regional County Municipality, in the administrative region of Capitale-Nationale, in Quebec, in Canada.

The lower part of the Verte River is mainly served by the Verte River path which runs on the east bank of the river. The rest of this valley is served by a few forest roads for the needs of forestry and recreational tourism activities.

The main economic activities in the sector are forestry and recreational tourism activities.

The surface of the Verte River (except the rapids areas) is generally frozen from the beginning of December to the end of March, but the safe circulation on the ice is generally made from the end of December to the beginning of March. The water level of the river varies with the seasons and the precipitation; the spring flood occurs in March or April.

== Geography ==
The main hydrographic slopes neighboring the Verte River are:

- north side: Sainte-Anne river, Talayarde River;
- east side: Sainte-Anne river;
- south side: Sainte-Anne river, Bras du Nord;
- west side: Bras du Nord, Écartée River.

The Verte River takes its source at the mouth of Lavinia Lake (altitude 387 metres (1,270 ft)). From this confluence, the Verte River flows over 7.4 kilometres (4.6 mi) generally towards the south in the forest zone, with a drop of 228 metres (748 ft), according to the following segments:

- 0.5 kilometres (0.31 mi) first towards the south-east, up to the outlet (coming from the north) of a group of eight small lakes;
- 3.8 kilometres (2.4 mi) to the south in a deep valley, intermittently forming small coils and forming a bend where the river turns east on a segment of 0.6 kilometres (0.37 mi), to the outlet (coming from the north) of an unidentified lake;
- 1.0 kilometre (0.62 mi) to the south in a deep valley crossing a good series of rapids, up to a stream (coming from the west);
- 2.1 kilometres (1.3 mi) towards the south-west showing a steep drop, then crossing a small plain, until its mouth.

The Verte River flows on the west bank of the Sainte-Anne River facing a few islands. This confluence is located at:

- 11.2 kilometres (7.0 mi) downstream of the Talayarde River;
- 3.4 kilometres (2.1 mi) north of downtown Saint-Raymond;
- 9.7 kilometres (6.0 mi) north-west of the center of the village of Lac-Sergent;
- 28.5 kilometres (17.7 mi) north-west of the north-west bank of the Saint Lawrence River.

From this confluence, the current descends on 86.3 kilometres (53.6 mi) generally south and southwest following the course of the Sainte-Anne river, to the northwest shore of St. Lawrence River.

== Toponymy ==
The toponym "Rivière Verte" was formalized on December 5, 1968, at the Place Names Bank of the Commission de toponymie du Québec.

== See also ==
- Saint-Raymond
- Portneuf Regional County Municipality
- Sainte-Anne River (Mauricie)
- List of rivers of Quebec

== Bibliography ==
- CAPSA (2014). Plans directeurs de l'eau des secteurs d'intervention de la zone de gestion de la CAPSA: Sainte-Anne, Portneuf et La Chevrotière (English: Water master plans of the intervention sectors of the CAPSA management area: Sainte-Anne, Portneuf and La Chevrotière) (PDF) (in French). Quebec: CAPSA. p. 691. Archived from the original (PDF) on 2019-02-14.
