= Rivière à Pierre (Batiscan River tributary) =

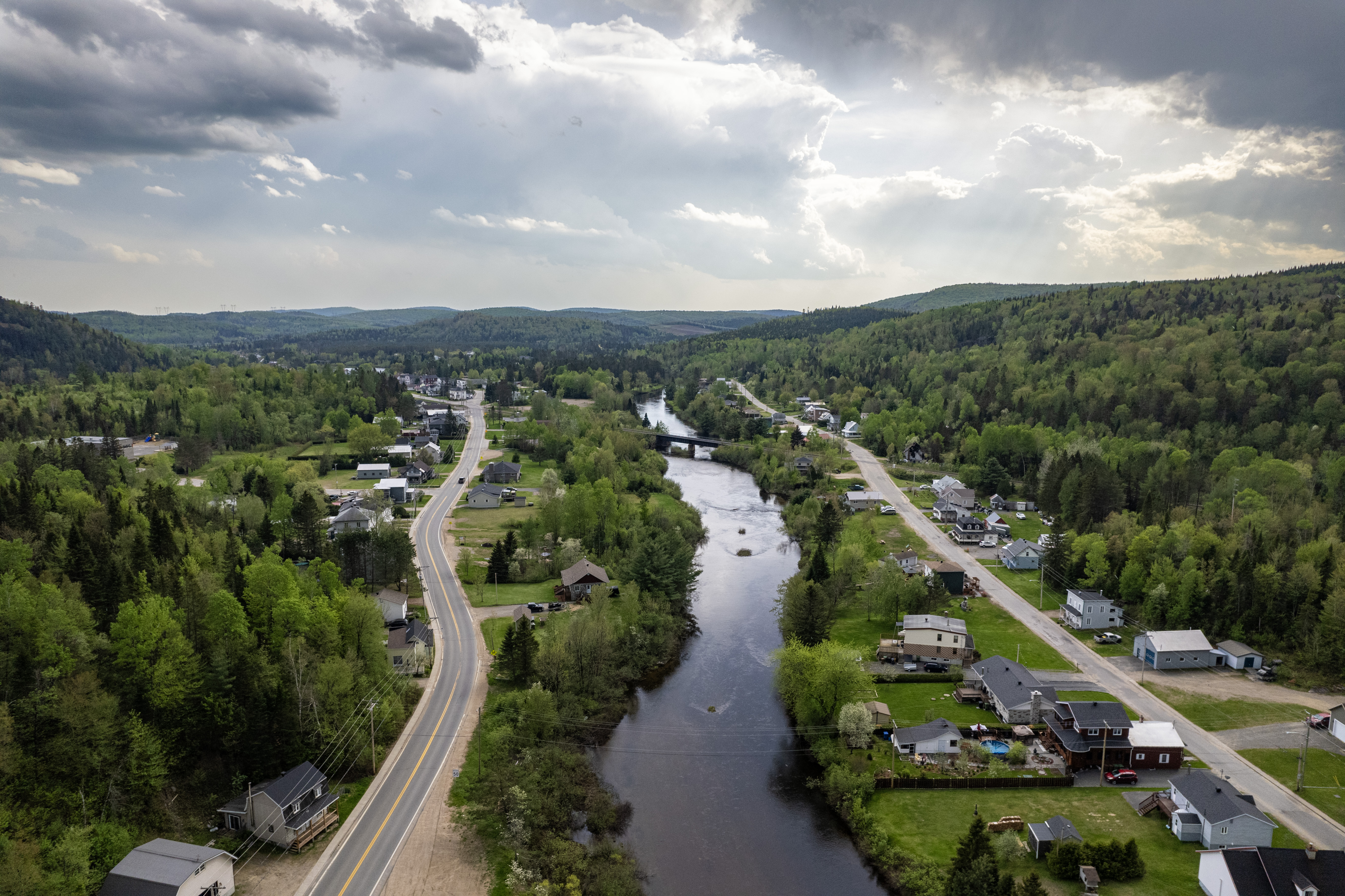

- Location within Quebec
- Native name: Karontatehlahnon (Wyandot) ('buried in stones')

Location
- Country: Canada
- Province: Quebec
- Region: Capitale-Nationale
- Regional County Municipality: Portneuf Regional County Municipality
- Unorganized territory and a municipality: Lac-Blanc and Rivière-à-Pierre

Physical characteristics
- Source: Vautri Lake
  - location: Lac-Blanc, Quebec
  - coordinates: 46.531395°N 72.487241°E
  - elevation: 576 km (358 mi)
- Mouth: Batiscan River
  - location: Rivière-à-Pierre, Quebec
  - coordinates: 46.965587°N 72.262267°W
  - elevation: 153 km (95 mi)
- Length: 42.3 km (26.3 mi)
- Basin size: 418.5 km^{2} (161.6 mi^{2})

Basin features
- Progression: Batiscan River → St. Lawrence River → Gulf of St. Lawrence / Atlantic Ocean
- Tributaries
  - left: (Upward from the mouth) Discharge from lakes Hervé, Poulin and Lucien, discharge from Lake Cinquante, discharge from Lakes Beaupré and de la Montagne, Petite rivière Batiscan, discharge from Lake Vic, discharge from Victory Lake, discharge from Clavier Lakes and at Cabane-d'Automne, outlet of Lac de l'Étable, outlet of Lac Écarté, outlet of Lac Dubé, outlet of Lac Léo.
  - right: (Upward from the mouth) Discharge from Lac de l'Affût, discharge from Cauchon lake, Blanche River (rivière à Pierre), discharge from Rond lake, discharge from Lac Vert, discharge from Lake Perdrix, discharge from Lake Leneuf, stream Gervais, discharge from Lake Rousseau, Lac Veillette outlet, "Les Quatre Lacs" outlet, Laneuville Lake outlet, Don Lake outlet.

The rivière à Pierre (English: River of Pierre) is a tributary of the east bank of the Batiscan River, flowing in the unorganized territories of Lac-Blanc (township of Neilson) and Linton (township of Tonty), as well as in the municipality of Rivière-à-Pierre (township of Bois), in the Portneuf Regional County Municipality, in the administrative region of Capitale-Nationale, in the province of Quebec, in Canada.

The course of the "rivière à Pierre" descends on the northeast side of the Batiscan River and on the northeast side of the St. Lawrence River. This river is part of the hydrographic side of the Batiscan River which generally winds south to the north bank of the St. Lawrence River.

The upper course of the "Pierre River" is entirely in the forest zone up to Lac du Dépôt; as well as the lower part from the outlet of Lac Cinquante. The agricultural area is concentrated around the village of Rivière-à-Pierre. The river surface is generally frozen from mid-December until the end of March.

Since the mid-19th century, forestry has been the predominant activity in the "Pierre river" watershed. At the end of the 19th century, the extraction of marble stones developed, as well as agriculture and recreational tourism.

The Canadian National railway runs along the "Pierre river" between the confluence of the Blanche River and the "Sainte-Anne rapids".

== Geography ==
The "Pierre river" has its source in a forest area at the mouth of Lac Cristal (length: 2.5 kilometres (1.6 mi); altitude: 457 metres (1,499 ft)). The mouth of this lake is located 35.9 kilometres (22.3 mi) northwest of the center of the village of Saint-Raymond, 30.6 kilometres (19.0 mi) northeast of the confluence of the "Pierre River" and 56.6 kilometres (35.2 mi) north of the north shore of the Saint-Laurent River, near Portneuf (city).

From its source, the Pierre River flows over 42.3 kilometres (26.3 mi), according to the following segments:

Upper course of the river (segment of 26.6 kilometres (16.5 mi))

- 2.3 kilometres (1.4 mi) south-west to the outlet of Lac Clavier (coming from the east);
- 1.2 kilometres (0.75 mi) south-west to the outlet of "Les Quatre Lacs" (coming from the North);
- 1.8 kilometres (1.1 mi) south-west to the outlet of Lac Veillette (coming from the north-west);
- 7.3 kilometres (4.5 mi) south-west to Gervais stream (coming from the North);
- 3.7 kilometres (2.3 mi) north-west to the limit of the municipality of Rivière-à-Pierre;
- 0.6 kilometres (0.37 mi) towards the North-West in Rivière-à-Pierre crossing the southern part of Lac de l'Original (length: 0.3 kilometres (0.19 mi); altitude : 290 metres (950 ft)) on 0.2 kilometres (0.12 mi), at the end of the segment, until its mouth;
- 0.9 kilometres (0.56 mi) towards the South crossing a small plain until the confluence of the Petite rivière Batiscan (coming from the East);
- 8.8 kilometres (5.5 mi) south-west in a deep valley to the north-west shore of Lac du Dépôt;

Lower river course (segment of 15.7 kilometres (9.8 mi))

- 1.9 kilometres (1.2 mi) towards the Southwest crossing Lac du Dépôt (length: 1.7 kilometres (1.1 mi); altitude: 208 metres (682 ft)) over its full length, up to a bend in the river;
- 1.2 kilometres (0.75 mi) to the Southwest, collecting the waters of the Blanche River (coming from the North) when entering the village, up to a bridge road;
- 2.5 kilometres (1.6 mi) towards the Southwest, passing through the village of Rivière-à-Pierre and passing under the railway bridge of the Canadian National, up to a bridge road;
- 3.7 kilometres (2.3 mi) south-west, up to a bend in the river;
- 3.2 kilometres (2.0 mi) towards the North-West, by forming three hooks towards the South-West, up to the outlet of Lac de l'Affût (coming from the North);
- 3.2 kilometres (2.0 mi) towards the Southwest, crossing a dozen falls and rapids, to the confluence of the river.

The Pierre River flows on the east bank of the Batiscan River in the municipality of Rivière-à-Pierre.

The confluence of the Pierre River is located at:

- 7.4 kilometres (4.6 mi) Southwest of the village center of Rivière-à-Pierre;
- 2.1 kilometres (1.3 mi) upstream of the limit of Notre-Dame-de-Montauban which cuts the Batiscan River;
- 9.7 kilometres (6.0 mi) North-East of the village center of Notre-Dame-de-Montauban
- 14.3 kilometres (8.9 mi) North-East of the center of the village of Lac-aux-Sables.

== Toponymy ==
In 1829, Jean-Pierre Proulx's survey reports indicated the toponym "Rivière à Pierre" and it was also mentioned in 1883 and 1884 in those of T. C. de La Chevrotière. Some authors have associated this name with the pioneer Pierre Beaupré (1884-1920) who settled on the banks of this river at the end of the 19th century.

Given the mention of 1829, the stony character of the river bed and its rocky outskirts has certainly inspired cartographers and local leaders in the designation of this watercourse. The quarry stones cannot be linked to the appellation since their exploitation began only in the 1880s.

The toponym "Rivière à Pierre" was formalized on December 5, 1968, at the Commission de toponymie du Québec.

== See also ==
- List of rivers of Quebec
