= Richard Sirois =

Richard Sirois may refer to:

- Rich Sirois (born 1957), Canadian hockey player
- Richard Z. Sirois (born 1956), Canadian radio personality
