= Neilson River (Bras du Nord) =

Location
- Country: Canada
- Province: Quebec
- Region: Capitale-Nationale, Mauricie
- Regional County Municipality: Portneuf Regional County Municipality and Lac-Croche
- Municipalities: Lac-Croche and Saint-Raymond

Physical characteristics
- Source: Lac du Partage
  - location: Lac-Croche, MRC Portneuf Regional County Municipality
  - coordinates: 47°25′21″N 71°37′59″W
  - elevation: 728 m (2,388 ft)
- Mouth: Bras du Nord
  - location: Saint-Raymond
  - coordinates: 47°05′20″N 71°53′23″W
  - elevation: 200 m (660 ft)
- Length: 62.1 km (38.6 mi)
- Discharge
  - location: Saint-Raymond

Basin features
- Tributaries
  - left: (Upward from the mouth) décharge du lac Touzin, décharge des lacs Lauzon, Cycnos et Lavardin, trois ruisseaux non identifiés, ruisseau Gagnon, ruisseau Leclerc, décharge (via lac Pasquet) du Petit lac Pasquet, décharge (via le lac Miraude) d'un ensemble de lacs dont Antoine, Nevair, Petit lac Nevair, décharge du lac Durouzeau, décharge du lac Grajon, décharge des lacs Bleury et Bastonis, décharge des lacs Perronet, Richard, Pomone et des Orpins, décharge du lac Josselin, décharge de l'Étang Ponctué.
  - right: (Upward from the mouth) Décharge du lac Gentioux, décharge de trois lacs dont le lac Patterson et Montrol, décharge du lac du Cotret, décharge d'un ensemble de lacs dont Moulineau, Picard, Marguerite, Philo et Aaron, quatre ruisseaux non identifiés, décharge d'un petit lac non identifié, ruisseau non identifié, décharge d'un ensemble de lacs dont Nollen et Petit lac Nollen, décharge d'un ensemble de lacs dont Grésin, Rosoy Charlotte, du Partage et Nikik, décharge du lac D'Aleyrac, décharge d'un ensemble de lacs dont du Brocard et Faubert, décharge de petits lacs non identifiés, décharge du lac Inerme, décharge d'un ensemble de lacs dont Nancy et Deuxième lac des Clavaires, décharge du lac Saint-Onge.

The Neilson River flows into the territory of the municipality of Saint-Raymond, in the Portneuf Regional County Municipality, in the administrative region of the Capitale-Nationale, in Quebec, in Canada.

The Neilson River is mainly served by the rang Saguenay road which runs on the east bank of the river.

The main economic activities in the sector are forestry and recreational tourism activities.

The surface of the North Arm (except the rapids zones) is generally frozen from the beginning of December to the end of March, but the safe circulation on the ice is generally made from the end of December to the beginning of March.

== Geography ==
Neilson River flows from north to south in the Roquemont Township, in Saint-Raymond in a forest environment, then turns west. It leaves the territory by redirecting again towards the south, to go to throw itself empting into the Bras du Nord in the row V of Roquemont Township, at the confluence of the Sainte-Anne Ouest River.

From the mouth of Lake Clémenceau, the course of the Neilson River descends on 62.1 kilometres (38.6 mi), with a drop in level of 528 metres (1,732 ft), according to the following segments:

Upper course of the Neilson river (segment of 25 kilometres (16 mi))

- 1.2 kilometres (0.75 mi) to the west, forming a curve towards the north, up to a bend in the river;
- 8.3 kilometres (5.2 mi) to the south, collecting the discharge (coming from the northwest) from Lac Saint-Onge, collecting the discharge (coming from the northeast) from Étang Ponctué, then branching off towards the southwest, to the outlet (coming from the north) of three lakes (Nancy, Premier lac des Clavaires and Second lac des Clavaires);
- 7.2 kilometres (4.5 mi) to the south, collecting the discharge (coming from the east) from Lac Josselin, collecting the discharge (coming from the west) from Lac du Cresson and the discharge (coming from north-west) from Étang aux Algues, to the outlet (coming from the east) of a group of lakes including Perronet, Richard and Pomone;
- 1.4 kilometres (0.87 mi) westwards, up to a bend in the river;
- 1.4 kilometres (0.87 mi) south, to the outlet (coming from the south) of Lake Bleury;
- 5.5 kilometres (3.4 mi) towards the west by forming a hook towards the north, until the discharge of a set of lakes including Brocard, Faubert and Cargré;

Intermediate course of the Neilson river (segment of 18.3 kilometres (11.4 mi))

- 4.1 kilometres (2.5 mi) towards the south becoming more and more steep, up to a bend of the river corresponding to the outlet of Lake Durouzeau;
- 1.8 kilometres (1.1 mi) to the southwest, collecting the outlet (coming from the nod) from Lac D'Aleyrac, to the outlet (coming from the northwest) of a set of lakes including Grésin, Rosoy, Charlotte, Nikik, Perronne and de la Carie;
- 3.2 kilometres (2.0 mi) towards the south in particular by crossing Lake Miraude (length: 0.7 kilometres (0.43 mi); altitude: 481 metres (1,578 ft)) on 0.7 kilometres (0.43 mi), to the north shore of Lake Hélène;
- 6.5 kilometres (4.0 mi) southwards crossing Lake Hélène (altitude: 476 metres (1,562 ft)) over its full length, to Leclerc stream (coming from the northeast);
- 2.7 kilometres (1.7 mi) towards the south-east notably by crossing Lake Neilson (length: 2.1 kilometres (1.3 mi); altitude: 473 metres (1,552 ft)) over its full length, to its mouth;

Lower Neilson River (downstream from Neilson Lake) (segment of 18.8 kilometres (11.7 mi))

- 1.8 kilometres (1.1 mi) southward, to a bend corresponding to the outlet (coming from the south) of Gagnon stream;
- 5.5 kilometres (3.4 mi) first towards the west, then towards the south-west, in a deep valley, to the outlet (coming from the north) of Lake Picard;
- 8.5 kilometres (5.3 mi) to the south in a well-steep valley passing at the foot of Cap des Sept Côtes whose summit culminates at 685 metres (2,247 ft) (on the west side of the river), to a stream (coming from the northeast);
- 3.0 kilometres (1.9 mi) to the south in a well-boxed valley, forming a curve towards the west to go around a mountain whose summit reaches 642 metres (2,106 ft), up to its mouth.

From this confluence, the current descends the course of Bras du Nord on 35.6 kilometres (22.1 mi) to the south, then the course of Sainte-Anne River on 76 kilometres (47 mi) generally southwest, to the northwest shore of the St. Lawrence River.

== Toponymy ==
The name "Zec Batiscan-Neilson" originates from the Neilson river flowing in Neilson Township, from the north end of the territory of the ZEC. This river flows first south, then turns west. She leaves the territory by redirecting back to the south to go jump into the Sainte-Anne River.

At fifty kilometers northwest of Quebec, Neilson Township has an irregular shape. Crossed by the river Neilson, this particular township includes lakes Aaron and Picard. This township is located in the extension of the lordship Saint-Gabriel and fief Hubert.

Adopted around 1916, the name Neilson Township honors John Neilson (1776–1848). For his work in public life, he contributed greatly to the development of the region since the early nineteenth century. Originally from Scotland, he came to live with his brother Samuel, who acquired the Quebec Gazette. In 1793, John inherited the newspaper and printing. Upon reaching his majority in 1796, he became editor-owner of the weekly newspaper. In 1816, Neilson helped recruit European settlers, mostly Irish, and encouraged them to settle in neighboring lordships in a township area which later became Valcartier. John Neilson was elected several times member of Quebec County, Quebec. He completed his final term as MP from 1842 to 1844 in the Parliament of United Canada.

The name "River Neilson" was recorded on December 5, 1968, at the bank of place names in Commission de toponymie du Québec (Geographical Names Board of Québec).

== See also ==
=== See also ===
- Saint-Raymond
- Portneuf Regional County Municipality
- Capitale-Nationale
- Neilson Township
- Bras du Nord
- Sainte-Anne
- Zec Batiscan-Neilson
- List of rivers of Quebec
