= Le Gardeur Lake (Lac-Croche) =

Lake in Lac-Croche, Quebec, Canada

- Location in Quebec
- Location: Lac-Croche (TNO), La Jacques-Cartier Regional County Municipality, Capitale-Nationale, Quebec, Canada
- Coordinates: 47.2975°N 71.85806°W
- Lake type: Natural
- Primary inflows: (clockwise from the mouth) Sainte-Anne Ouest River and discharge of lakes Runan and Mancion.
- Primary outflows: Sainte-Anne Ouest River
- Basin countries: Canada
- Max. length: 3.3 km (2.1 mi)
- Max. width: 1.1 km (0.68 mi)
- Surface area: 1.15 km^{2} (0.44 sq mi)
- Surface elevation: 604 m (1,982 ft)

The lac Le Gardeur (English: Le Gardeur Lake) is a freshwater body in the head area of the Sainte-Anne Ouest River in the unorganized territory of Lac-Croche, in the La Jacques-Cartier Regional County Municipality, in the administrative region of Capitale-Nationale, in the province from Quebec, to Canada. This body of water is located southwest of the Laurentides Wildlife Reserve.

The southern part of the lake is served by a forest road and another pass on the east side.

Forestry is the main economic activity in the sector; recreotourism activities, second.

The surface of Lac Le Gardeur is usually frozen from the beginning of December to the end of March, however the safe circulation on the ice is generally from mid-December to mid-March.

== Geography ==
The Le Gardeur Lake has a length of 3.3 kilometres (2.1 mi), a width of 1.1 kilometres (0.68 mi) and its surface is at an altitude of 604 metres (1,982 ft). This lake between the mountains is made like an inverted U. A peninsula attached to the south shore stretches north 1.3 kilometres (0.81 mi). It has an area of 1.15 hectares (2.8 acres) and drains a catchment area of 16.12 hectares (39.8 acres).

Lac Le Gardeur is supplied with water on the northwest side by the outlet of the Sainte-Anne Ouest River (outlet of Fairchild Lake), as well as by the outlet (coming from the northeast) of Lakes Runan and Mancion.

From the mouth of Lac Le Gardeur, the current descends on 34.9 kilometres (21.7 mi) following the course of the Sainte-Anne Ouest River until the confluence of the Neilson River; on 35.6 kilometres (22.1 mi) south by the Bras du Nord; on 76 kilometres (47 mi) south-west via the Sainte-Anne River to the northeast bank of the St. Lawrence River.

== Toponymy ==
The toponym Lac Le Gardeur was formalized on December 5, 1968, by the Commission de toponymie du Québec.

== See also ==
- St. Lawrence River
- List of lakes of Canada

== Bibliography ==
- CAPSA (2014). Water master plans of the intervention sectors of the CAPSA management area: Sainte-Anne, Portneuf and La Chevrotière (PDF) (in French). Quebec: CAPSA. p. 691. Archived from the original (PDF) on 2019-02-14.
