= Holtzman v. Hellenbrand =

In the Matter of Holtzman v. Hellenbrand
- Court: New York Supreme Court, Appellate Division
- Full case name: In the Matter of Elizabeth Holtzman, as District Attorney of Kings County, Petitioner, v. Julius Hellenbrand, a Justice of the Supreme Court, Respondent. Neil Sirois, Defendant-respondent.
- Decided: March 24, 1983

Court membership
- Judges sitting: Guy James Mangano, William C. Thompson, Frank Gulotta, Jeremy S. Weinstein, Isaac Rubin

Case opinions
- Decision by: Per curiam
- Concurrence: Mangano, Thompson, Gulotta, Weinstein, Rubin

Keywords
- Admissible evidence

Holtzman v. Hellenbrand (1983) was a case in the U.S. state of New York concerning the admissibility of a prior statement by a person who later refused to testify in court. American law assures a defendant an opportunity to confront people testifying against them (so the prior statement would only be someone's hearsay statement), but prohibits a person from profiting by their wrongdoing so should not be able to avoid the statement if they criminally induced the person to not testify in court.

== Factual Background ==
The defendant, Mr. Neil Sirois, was charged in Kings County with second-degree murder. Mr. Sirois's wife was present at the scene of the alleged murder on December 6, 1980. Following her testimony before a grand jury, and the subsequent indictment of her husband, Mrs. Sirois partially recanted and informed the Assistant District Attorney that she would not testify. She then fled the jurisdiction.

On March 1, 1983, Mrs. Sirois was arrested on a material witness order, in Kings County, where she had assumed a different name. Sirois continued to refuse to testify against her husband. The judge threatened contempt, offered in-camera testimony, and offered transactional immunity, and she continued to refuse to testify.

Mrs. Sirois was held in contempt of the court's order and sentenced to 30 days' incarceration and a $250 fine. Based on the incarceration, the People moved to adjourn for the 30 days, which the trial court denied. Without further evidence, the case was dismissed.

The People appealed, arguing that U.S. v. Mastrangelo required the court hold a hearing to determine whether or not "the defendant by his misconduct had induced his wife to unlawfully refused to testify at trial."

== Holding ==
In 1983, the Second Department of New York's Appellate Division held that hearsay statements of a declarant who refuses to testify at trial are admissible for the truth of the matter asserted. The Court, while recognizing the Constitutional mandates of the Confrontation Clause, held that a defendant should not benefit from his or her wrongdoing in preventing a witness from testifying against him or her, and hearsay statements of the declarant are thus admissible if the prosecution can meet its burden. Holtzman established the New York precedent of Sirois hearings—an evidentiary hearing to determine the admissibility of out-of-court statements by an unavailable witness.
