= Sainte-Anne Ouest River =

Sainte-Anne Ouest River Old name: "William River"
- Location within Quebec

Location
- Country: Canada
- Province: Quebec
- Region: Capitale-Nationale, Mauricie
- Regional County Municipality: Portneuf Regional County Municipality
- Municipalities: Saint-Raymond, and Lac-Blanc and Lac-Croche

Physical characteristics
- Source: Annette Lake
  - location: Lac-Blanc, MRC Portneuf Regional County Municipality
  - coordinates: 47°18′57″N 71°53′02″W
  - elevation: 627 m (2,057 ft)
- Mouth: Bras du Nord
  - location: Saint-Raymond
  - coordinates: 47°05′22″N 71°53′25″W
  - elevation: 200 m (660 ft)
- Length: 40.9 km (25.4 mi)
- Discharge
  - location: Saint-Raymond

Basin features
- Tributaries
  - left: (Upward from the mouth) Décharge de trois petits lacs non identifiés, ruisseau du Crapeau (décharge d'un lac du lac du Crapaud), ruisseau non identifié, décharge de deux lacs non identifiés, décharge du lac Froville (via le Lac de la Rainure), décharge du lac Jacques, décharge du lac Nosny (via le lac Drucilla), décharge des lacs Lorrie, Faux et du Pinson, décharge du lac du Butor, ruisseau non identifié, ruisseau non identifié, décharge d'un lac non identifié, ruisseau non identifié, décharge d'un lac non identifié (via le lac Pinsart), décharge d'un lac non identifié, décharge d'un ensemble de lacs (Alliat, Sai, Valros, Fonds et Nollet), décharge (via le Lac Le Gardeur) des lacs Runan, Nollen et Mancion, décharge (via le Lac Le Gardeur) du Lac Pimbo, décharge (via le Lac Le Gardeur) du lac Herpont, ruisseau non identifié (via le Lac Fairchild), ruisseau non identifié (via le Lac Annette).
  - right: (Upward from the mouth) Décharge d'un ensemble de lacs (de la Remise, de l'Épinette et de la Croupe), ruisseau non identifié, décharge du lac Deleau, ruisseau Rouge (décharge du lac Chiron), décharge d'un ensemble de lacs dont Lisse, Nevers et en Biais, décharge de deux petits lacs, décharge de trois petits lacs dont lac Luceau, décharge d'un petit lac (via le Lac de la Rainure), ruisseau non identifié (via le Lac de la Rainure), décharge d'un ensemble de lacs (Robb, du Club, Foch, Duff, Bella, Gruet et Saint-Laurent), décharge du lac Candor, ruisseau non identifié, ruisseau non identifié (via le lac William), décharge du lac Betty, décharge du lac Tee, décharge d'une ensemble de lacs (Pébrac, Gaston, Giroux, Gorren, Insipide, Blé, Nessa, aux Bleuets et Nessa), décharge du Lac Cunningham, décharge du lac Éboulis, décharge d'un lac non identifié (via le Lac Fairfield).

The Sainte-Anne Ouest River is a tributary of the Bras du Nord flowing in the unorganized territory of Lac-Blanc and Lac-Croche, as well as in the town of Saint-Raymond, in the MRC Portneuf Regional County Municipality, in the administrative region of Capitale-Nationale, in Quebec, in Canada.

The Sainte-Anne Ouest river is mainly served by the forest road R0320 and the rang Saguenay road which passes on the east bank of the Neilson river and the Bras du Nord.

The main economic activities in the sector are forestry and recreational tourism activities.

The surface of the Sainte-Anne Ouest river (except the rapids) is generally frozen from the beginning of December to the end of March; however, safe circulation on the ice is generally from late December to early March.

== Geography ==
The Sainte-Anne Ouest river rises at the mouth of Lake Annette (length: 1.4 kilometres (0.87 mi); altitude 626 metres (2,054 ft)). This lake is located on the southern slope of the watershed boundary with Batiscan Lake (Quebec). Its mouth is located at:

- 2.6 kilometres (1.6 mi) south of Batiscan Lake (Quebec);
- 25.0 kilometres (15.5 mi) northwest of the confluence of the Sainte-Anne Ouest river and the Neilson River;
- 47.6 kilometres (29.6 mi) north of the confluence of the Bras du Nord and the Sainte-Anne River.

From the mouth of Lake Annette, the Sainte-Anne Ouest river flows over 40.9 kilometres (25.4 mi) generally southward entirely in the forest zone, with a drop of 427 metres (1,401 ft).

The course of the Sainte-Anne Ouest river descends in the following segments:

Upper course of the Sainte-Anne Ouest river (segment of 15.9 kilometres (9.9 mi))

- 2.0 kilometres (1.2 mi) towards the south-east crossing Lake Querré, then Lake Fairchild (length: 2.2 kilometres (1.4 mi); altitude 687 metres (2,254 ft)) on 1.2 kilometres (0.75 mi)) to its mouth;
- 4.0 kilometres (2.5 mi) to the east, in particular by crossing the Lac Le Gardeur (length: 3.3 kilometres (2.1 mi); altitude 604 metres (1,982 ft)) over its full length to its mouth;
- 2.9 kilometres (1.8 mi) to the south in a deep valley, notably crossing an unidentified lake (length: 0.9 kilometres (0.56 mi); altitude 585 metres (1,919 ft)) on its full length, up to the outlet (coming from the east) of a set of lakes including Lac Nollet;
- 0.6 kilometres (0.37 mi) westward curving southwards, to the outlet of Cunningham Lake (coming from the northwest);
- 6.4 kilometres (4.0 mi) towards the south in particular by crossing Pinsart Lake (length: 0.8 kilometres (0.50 mi); altitude 534 metres (1,752 ft)), then branching towards west, to the outlet (coming from the northwest) of a set of lakes including Nessa, aux Bleuets, Gorren and Insipide;

Lower course of the Sainte-Anne Ouest river (segment of 25.0 kilometres (15.5 mi))

- 2.9 kilometres (1.8 mi) towards the southwest by collecting the discharge (coming from the northwest) from Lake Betty, then crossing Lake William (length: 1.3 kilometres (0.81 mi); altitude 491 metres (1,611 ft)) on 0.9 kilometres (0.56 mi) south-east to its mouth;
- 2.2 kilometres (1.4 mi) towards the south-east by crossing some rapids until the discharge (coming from the east) of two unidentified lakes;
- 2.8 kilometres (1.7 mi) to the south, in particular by crossing Lake Drucilla (length: 1.3 kilometres (0.81 mi); altitude 451 metres (1,480 ft)) on 0.9 kilometres (0.56 mi) to its mouth;
- 1.1 kilometres (0.68 mi) towards the west by forming a curve towards the north to go around a mountain, up to a bend of the river, corresponding to the discharge (coming from the northwest) of a set of lakes;
- 8.3 kilometres (5.2 mi) in a deep valley, first towards the south-east and bifurcating towards the south, up to the stream of Crapaud (coming from the north-east);
- 1.8 kilometres (1.1 mi) to the south in a deep valley and crossing some rapids, until the Red stream (coming from the west);
- 5.9 kilometres (3.7 mi) in a deep valley crossing some rapids, first towards the east by collecting the discharge (coming from the south) from an unidentified lake, bending towards the south-east by collecting the discharge (coming from the southwest) of a group of lakes, and bypassing an island at the end of the segment, to its mouth.

The Sainte-Anne Ouest river flows at the confluence of the Neilson River; this confluence becomes the source of the Bras du Nord. From there, the current generally descends south following the course of the latter to the northwest bank of the Sainte-Anne River. From this last confluence, the current descends on 76.0 kilometres (47.2 mi) generally towards the south and the southwest by following the course of the Sainte-Anne river, until the northwest bank of St. Lawrence River.

== Toponymy ==
The toponym "Rivière Sainte-Anne Ouest" was formalized on December 5, 1968, at the Place Names Bank of the Commission de toponymie du Québec.

== See also ==
- List of rivers of Quebec

== Bibliography ==
- CAPSA (2014). Water master plans of the intervention sectors of the CAPSA management area: Sainte-Anne, Portneuf and La Chevrotière (PDF). Quebec: CAPSA. p. 691. Archived from the original (PDF) on 2019-02-14.
