= Cachée River (Mauvaise River tributary) =

Cachée River Rivière Cachée
- Location within Quebec

Location
- Country: Canada
- Province: Quebec
- Region: Capitale-Nationale
- Regional County Municipality: Portneuf Regional County Municipality
- Municipality: Saint-Raymond

Physical characteristics
- Source: Cachée Lake
  - location: Saint-Raymond
  - coordinates: 46°59′26″N 71°57′48″W
  - elevation: 404 m (1,325 ft)
- Mouth: Mauvaise River
  - location: Saint-Raymond
  - coordinates: 46°57′37″N 71°54′40″W
  - elevation: 259 m (850 ft)
- Length: 9.1 km (5.7 mi)

Basin features
- Tributaries
  - left: (Upward from the mouth) Discharge of a little unidentified lake.
  - right: (Upward from the mouth) Discharge of Les Trois Petits Lacs, discharge of Lac Morasse and du Petit lac Morasse, discharge of Lac no Good.

The rivière Cachée (English: Hidden River) is a tributary of the Mauvaise River flowing in the town of Saint-Raymond, in the Portneuf Regional County Municipality, in the administrative region of Capitale-Nationale, in Quebec, in Canada.

The Cachée river valley is served by a few forest roads for the needs of forestry and recreational tourism activities.

The main economic activities in the sector are forestry; recreotourism activities, second.

The surface of the Hidden River (except the rapids areas) is generally frozen from the beginning of December to the end of March, but safe circulation on the ice is generally made from the end of December to the beginning of March. The water level of the river varies with the seasons and the precipitation; the spring flood occurs in March or April.

== Geography ==
The Cachée river has its source at the confluence of Lac Caché (length: 0.4 kilometres (0.25 mi); altitude 404 metres (1,325 ft)). The mouth of this lake is located at:

- 14.3 kilometres (8.9 mi) north-west of the confluence of the Cachée river and the Bras du Nord;
- 20.5 kilometres (12.7 mi) north-west of Saint-Raymond;
- 40 kilometres (25 mi) north-west of the St. Lawrence River.

From this confluence, the Cachée river flows on 9.1 kilometres (5.7 mi) generally towards the south-east and in the forest zone, with a drop of 248 metres (814 ft), according to the following segments:

- 3.7 kilometres (2.3 mi) first on 2.4 kilometres (1.5 mi) towards the south in particular by crossing on 0.4 kilometres (0.25 mi) a small forest lake, then on 1.3 kilometres (0.81 mi) eastward across Lake Renversi (length: 1.3 kilometres (0.81 mi); altitude: 274 metres (899 ft)), to its mouth. Note: Lake Renversi has a marsh area in its western part which is bounded by two opposite peninsulas. This lake also receives on the west side the outlet of Lac No Good;
- 0.8 kilometres (0.50 mi) to the east in a deep valley, to the outlet (coming from the south) of Lac Morasse and Petit Lac Morasse;
- 3.0 kilometres (1.9 mi) to the east in a well-steep valley bending to the south-east by skirting a mountain, to the outlet of "Les Trois Petits Lacs";
- 0.3 kilometres (0.19 mi) north-east in a small plain, to its mouth.

The mouth of the Cachée river flows on the west bank of the Mauvaise River, that is to the south side of the hamlet "Rivière-Mauvaise". This confluence is located at:

- 1.2 kilometres (0.75 mi) north-east of a mountain peak (altitude: 490 metres (1,610 ft);
- 3.9 kilometres (2.4 mi) west of the mouth of the Bad River and the Bras du Nord;
- 9.7 kilometres (6.0 mi) north-west of the route 365 bridge which passes through downtown Saint-Raymond;
- 50.5 kilometres (31.4 mi) north of the confluence of the Sainte-Anne River and the St. Lawrence River.

From the mouth of the Cachée River, the current flows successively in the following segments, over:

- 9.0 kilometres (5.6 mi) following the course of the Mauvaise River;
- 11.7 kilometres (7.3 mi) generally towards the south following the course of the Bras du Nord;
- 76.0 kilometres (47.2 mi) generally south and southwest following the course of the Sainte-Anne river, to the northwest shore of the St. Lawrence River.

== Toponymy ==
The toponym Rivière Cachée was formalized on December 5, 1968, at the Place Names Bank of the Commission de toponymie du Québec.

== See also ==
- Portneuf Regional County Municipality
- Mauvaise River
- Bras du Nord
- Sainte-Anne River (Mauricie)
- List of rivers of Quebec

== Bibliography ==
- CAPSA (2014). Plans directeurs de l'eau des secteurs d'intervention de la zone de gestion de la CAPSA: Sainte-Anne, Portneuf et La Chevrotière (Water master plans for the intervention sectors of the CAPSA management area: Sainte-Anne, Portneuf and La Chevrotière) (PDF) (in French). Quebec. p. 691. Archived from the original (PDF) on 2019-02-14.
