= Talayarde River =

Talayarde River Rivière Talayarde
- Location within Quebec

Location
- Country: Canada
- Province: Quebec
- Region: Capitale-Nationale
- Regional County Municipality: Portneuf Regional County Municipality
- Municipality: Saint-Raymond

Physical characteristics
- Source: Talayarde Lake
  - location: Saint-Raymond
  - coordinates: 47.16022°N 71.74384°W
  - elevation: 561 m (1,841 ft)
- Mouth: Talayarde River
  - location: Saint-Raymond
  - coordinates: 46.99445°N 71.74639°W
  - elevation: 245 m (804 ft)
- Length: 23 km (14 mi)

Basin features
- Tributaries
  - left: (Upward from the mouth) Unidentified stream, discharge from two unidentified lakes, discharge from an unidentified marsh lake, discharge from McKinney Lake and Little McKinney Lake.
  - right: (Upward from the mouth) Talayarde North-East River, discharge from an unidentified lake, discharge from Lac de la Bibite and Petit lac de la Bibite, discharge from an unidentified mountain lake, stream Couat, discharge from a lake unidentified mountain stream, discharge from an unidentified marsh lake.

The rivière Talayarde is a tributary of the Sainte-Anne river flowing in the unorganized territory of Lac-Blanc and in the town of Saint-Raymond, in the MRC Portneuf Regional County Municipality, in the administrative region of Capitale-Nationale, at Quebec, in Canada.

The Talayarde river valley is mainly served by the forest road R0300 which goes up north passing on the east side of the valley. Some secondary roads serve the territory for the needs of forestry and recreational tourism activities.

The main economic activities in the sector are forestry and recreational tourism activities.

The surface of the Talayarde River (except the rapids areas) is generally frozen from the beginning of December to the end of March, but the safe circulation on the ice is generally made from the end of December to the beginning of March. The water level of the river varies with the seasons and the precipitation; the spring flood occurs in March or April.

== Geography ==
The main hydrographic slopes near the Talayarde river are:

- north side: Sainte-Anne river;
- east side: Sainte-Anne river, Talayarde North-East River;
- south side: Sainte-Anne river, Verte river;
- west side: Bras du Nord, Écartée River.

The Talayarde River rises at the mouth of Talayarde Lake (length: 0.8 kilometres (0.50 mi); altitude: 561 metres (1,841 ft)) located in the unorganized territory of Lac-Blanc. From this mouth, the Talayarde river flows over 23 kilometres (14 mi) generally towards the south in the forest zone, with a drop of 316 metres (1,037 ft), according to the following segments:

- 9.5 kilometres (5.9 mi) towards the south by bifurcating towards the south-east, up to the Couat stream (coming from the north-west);
- 6.7 kilometres (4.2 mi) towards the southwest by bending towards the south in a deep valley, to the outlet (coming from the west) of Lac de la Bibite and Petit lac de la Bibite;
- 4.6 kilometres (2.9 mi) by first forming a hook towards the east, then towards the south and towards the south-east in a deep valley crossing a series of rapids, until the Talayarde river North- East (coming from the north);
- 2.2 kilometres (1.4 mi) to the south forming a large S between the foot of the mountain (west side) and the plain on the east side, to its mouth.

The Talayarde river flows on the west bank of the Sainte-Anne river facing a few islands. This confluence is located at:

- 11.2 kilometres (7.0 mi) upstream of the Verte River;
- 13.1 kilometres (8.1 mi) north of downtown Saint-Raymond;
- 5.5 kilometres (3.4 mi) north of the village center of Lac-Sept-Îles;
- 60.3 kilometres (37.5 mi) north-west of the north-west bank of the Saint-Laurent river.

From this confluence, the current descends on 97.9 kilometres (60.8 mi) generally towards the south and the southwest by following the course of the Sainte-Anne river, until the northwest bank of the St. Lawrence River.

== Toponymy ==
This toponym appears on the 1829 plan of the chief Wendat (Huron); Nicolas Vincent uses the Telahiay spelling to designate this watercourse. In the same year, surveyor-explorer John Adams wrote that the Wendats "call this branch of the Ste. Anne Tilayer ”(Les Ailes Marquées) after a crazy tradition of the removal of an otter by a bird, which would have marked the snow with the tips of its wings. The surveyor Ignace P.-Déry designated this river under the name Talleyarde, in 1862. The surveyor NJE Lefrançois used the current form Rivière Talayarde in his report of 1888.

The toponym "Talayarde River" was formalized on December 5, 1968, at the Place Names Bank of the Commission de toponymie du Québec.

== See also ==
- List of rivers of Quebec

== Bibliography ==
- CAPSA (2014). Plans directeurs de l'eau des secteurs d'intervention de la zone de gestion de la CAPSA: Sainte-Anne, Portneuf et La Chevrotière (Water master plans of the intervention sectors of the CAPSA management area: Sainte-Anne, Portneuf and La Chevrotière) (PDF) (in French). Quebec: CAPSA. p. 691. Archived from the original (PDF) on 2019-02-14.
