= Blanche River (rivière à Pierre) =

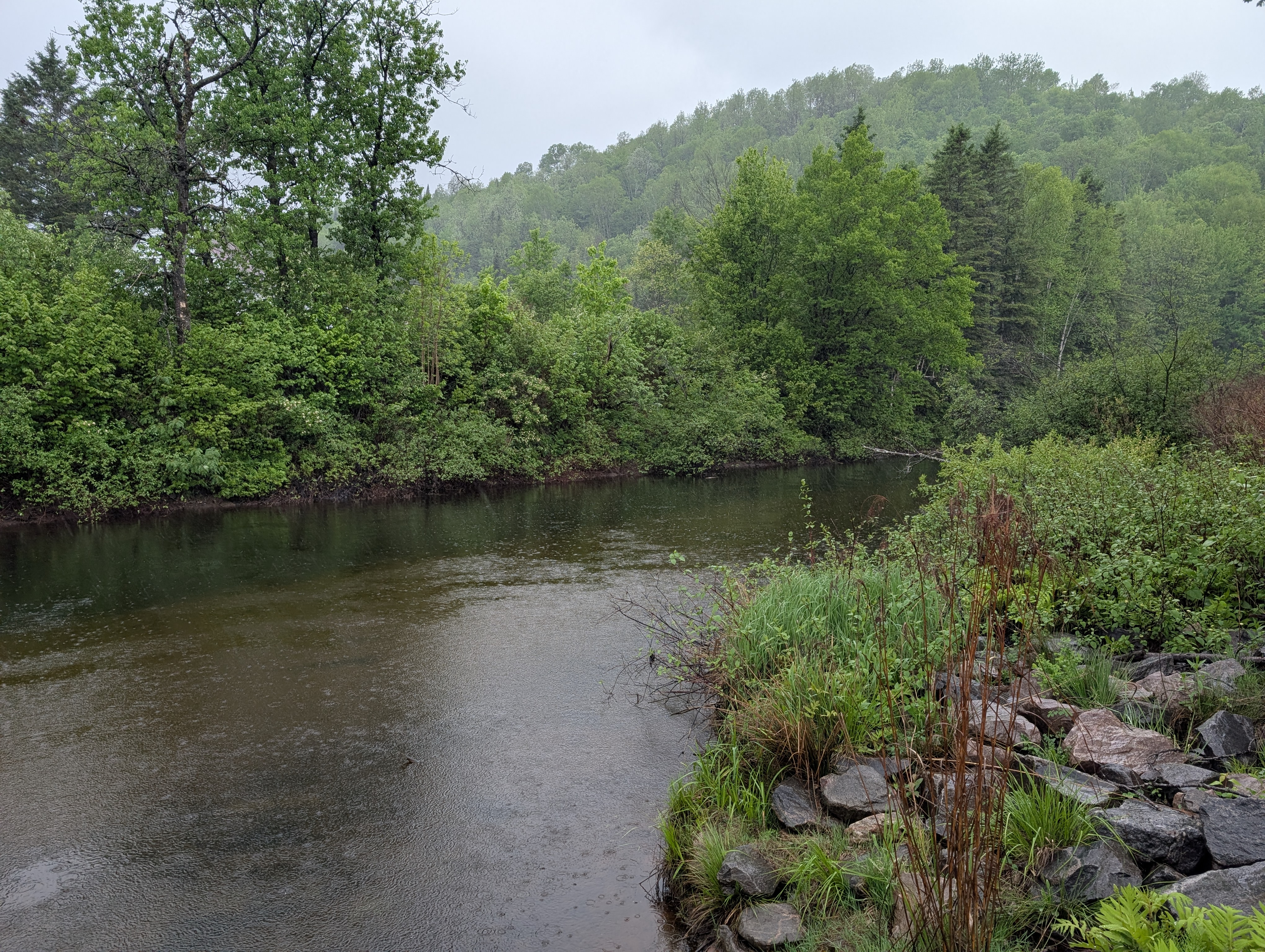
- Native name: Rivière Blanche (French)

Location
- Province: Quebec
- Region: Capitale-Nationale
- Regional County Municipality: Portneuf Regional County Municipality
- Unorganized territory and municipality: Lac-Blanc and Rivière-à-Pierre

Physical characteristics
- Source: Blanc Lake
  - location: Lac-Blanc
  - coordinates: 47.28778°N 72.01055°W
  - elevation: 482 m (1,581 ft)
- Mouth
  - location: Rivière-à-Pierre
  - coordinates: 46.99972°N 72.17583°W
  - elevation: 210 m (690 ft)
- Discharge
  - location: Rivière-à-Pierre

Basin features
- Tributaries
  - left: (upward from the mouth) Kennedy Lakes outlet, unidentified lake outlet, Lac Desliettes outlet, Circulaire lake outlet, Lac à la Truite outlet, Petit lac Gagnon outlet (via Lac du Galet), unidentified stream, unidentified stream (via Lorenzo lake), outlet (via Lorenzo lake) from Harry and Renard lakes, Tonty stream (via Lorenzo lake), Benacis outlet (via Lorenzo lake), Funny stream (via Lietto lake), outlet of Buck lake, outlet of Lac de la Daine.
  - right: (upward from the mouth) Lake Castor outlet, Gauvin lake outlet, three unidentified streams, outlet for a group of lakes including Lebrodeur, Edgar and Brancheau, outlet for three unidentified small lakes, outlet for Lac des Deux Baies, outlet for a lake unidentified, discharge from four unidentified small lakes, discharge from three unidentified lakes, unidentified stream, discharge from Central Lake and Small central lake (via Lac du Galet), discharge from Lac Perrière, discharge from Lakes Todd and du Sun, unidentified stream, discharge from six small unidentified lakes, discharge from Lac Poire.
- Pool: Batiscanie

The Blanche River (French: rivière Blanche, pronounced [ʁivjɛʁ blɑ̃ʃ], lit. 'White River') rises in Blanc Lake and flows through the unorganized territory of Lac-Blanc and the municipality of Rivière-à-Pierre in the MRC Portneuf, in the administrative region of Capitale-Nationale, on the North Shore of St. Lawrence River in the province of Quebec in Canada.

== Geography ==
The White River covers a large catchment area (adjacent to the west side of the upper basin of the Rivière-à-Pierre) of 203 square kilometres (78 mi^{2}). Its source is Blanc Lake (Lac Blanc), where a dam is built at the mouth. Over a dozen smaller lakes from the surrounding area flow into the White Lake. Downstream, the waters of the White River flow through a series of lakes (Lupe lakes, Ralph, Gilles, Tony, Lietto and Lorenzo lakes) to the village of Rivière-à-Pierre, where its mouth pours into Rivière à Pierre.

The Portneuf Wildlife Reserve includes the middle part of the watershed of the White River. Upstream on the White River, the southern boundary of the reserve is 6.3 kilometres (3.9 mi) in a direct line from the village of Rivière-à-Pierre. The northern part of the watershed includes the Central and Perriere lakes. The northern part of the watershed of the White River is integrated into the Zec of the White River, including lakes Lorenzo and Tony.

== Toponymy ==
The following names are all interconnected and have been included in the Bank of place names in Commission de toponymie du Québec (Geographical Names Board of Quebec):

- "Unorganized territory of White Lake", recorded as of March 13, 1986,
- "Zec of the White River", listed on 5 August 1982,
- "White River", recorded December 5, 1968
- "White Lake", recorded as of December 5, 1968, is the largest lake in the Unorganized Territory of White Lake.

== See also ==
- Unorganized territory of Lac-Blanc
- Rivière-à-Pierre
- Batiscanie
- Batiscan River
- Portneuf Wildlife Reserve
- Laurentides Wildlife Reserve
- Portneuf Regional County Municipality (RCM)
- List of rivers of Quebec
