= Sirois hearing =

Legal hearing

A Sirois hearing is a legal hearing used when a prosecution witness either becomes unavailable to testify at trial or refuses to testify, and the prosecution alleges that this is due to the defendant's misconduct. In this situation, the prosecution may introduce the witness's prior statements at trial if it can show that the defendant is responsible for the witness's nonappearance.

In order to obtain the hearing, the prosecution must allege specific facts that the defendant's conduct induced the witness's refusal. Absent waiver by the defendant, a hearing is needed to determine the admissibility of the prior statement, where the prosecution must establish defendant's responsibility for a witness refusing to testify (People v. Johnson). The prosecution is required to show "clear and convincing proof" of the defendant's malfeasance as the admission of such testimony violates the defendant's Sixth Amendment rights "to be confronted with the witnesses against him". Additionally, the Sirois ruling also results in the absent witness's statement becoming de facto unquestionable.

The hearing is named after Neil Sirois, the defendant in Holtzman v. Hellenbrand.
