= Mauvaise River =

Mauvaise River Rivière Mauvaise
- Location within Quebec

Location
- Country: Canada
- Province: Quebec
- Region: Capitale-Nationale
- Regional County Municipality: Portneuf Regional County Municipality
- Municipality: Saint-Raymond

Physical characteristics
- Source: Masson Lake
  - location: Saint-Raymond
  - coordinates: 47.03958°N 71.99353°W
  - elevation: 425 m (1,394 ft)
- Mouth: Bras du Nord
  - location: Saint-Raymond
  - coordinates: 46.88694°N 71.86472°W
  - elevation: 156 m (512 ft)
- Length: 22.4 km (13.9 mi)

Basin features
- Tributaries
  - left: (Upward from the mouth) Quatre ruisseaux non identifiés, ruisseau non identifié drainant de petits lacs, décharge d'un ensemble de lacs dont Joachim, Mai, sec, du Milieu, à la Vase et du Chicot, ruisseau non identifié (via le Lac des Soixante Arpents), décharge (via le Lac des Soixante Arpents) du Lac Alexandre, du Petit lac Alexandre et du lac Romuald.
  - right: (Upward from the mouth) Ruisseau non identifié, Cachée River, décharge d'un petit lac non identifié, décharge de trois petits lacs non identifiés, décharge (via le Lac des Soixante Arpents) d'un lac non identifié.

The Mauvaise River (English: Bad River) is a tributary of the Bras du Nord flowing in the town of Saint-Raymond, in the Portneuf Regional County Municipality, in the administrative region of Capitale-Nationale, in Quebec, in Canada.

The lower part of the Mauvaise River is mainly served by the "chemin du Petit rang Colbert", the "chemin du rang Sainte-Croix" and the "rue des Récollets". The upper and intermediate parts are served by a few forest roads for the needs of forestry and recreational tourism activities.

The main economic activities in the sector are forestry; recreotourism activities, second.

The surface of the Mauvaise River (except rapids) is generally frozen from early December to late March, but safe circulation on the ice is generally from late December to early March. The water level of the river varies with the seasons and the precipitation; the spring flood occurs in March or April.

== Geography ==
The Mauvaise River takes its source at the confluence of Lake Masson (length: 1.4 kilometres (0.87 mi); altitude 425 metres (1,394 ft)). The mouth of this lake is located at:

- 14.3 kilometres (8.9 mi) north-west of the confluence of the Mauvaise River and the Bras du Nord;
- 20.5 kilometres (12.7 mi) north-west of Saint-Raymond;
- 40 kilometres (25 mi) north-west of the St. Lawrence River.

From this confluence, the Mauvaise River flows on 22.4 kilometres (13.9 mi) first towards the south, the south-east, then the north-east, generally in the forest zone, sometimes agricultural at the end of the course, with a drop of 269 metres (883 ft), according to the following segments:

- 1.2 kilometres (0.75 mi) to the south, in particular by crossing the Lac des Îles (length: 1.1 kilometres (0.68 mi); altitude 423 metres (1,388 ft)) over its full length, to its mouth;
- 2.3 kilometres (1.4 mi) first south on 0.8 kilometres (0.50 mi), then south-east across Portage Lake (length: 1.5 kilometres (0.93 mi) ; altitude 403 metres (1,322 ft)) over its full length, up to the dam at its mouth;
- 4.0 kilometres (2.5 mi) to the south-east, crossing the "Lac des Sixty Arpents" (altitude 403 metres (1,322 ft)) over its full length, to the dam at its mouth. Note: this lake enclosed between the mountains receives on the north side the outlet of Lake Alexandre and Petit lac Alexandre;
- 2.1 kilometres (1.3 mi) towards the south-east in a well-boxed valley, crossing two series of rapids, until the discharge (coming from the north) of a set of lakes including Joachim, Middle and Sirois;
- 3.8 kilometres (2.4 mi) towards the south-east in a deep valley, first forming a hook of 0.4 kilometres (0.25 mi) towards the south, passing in front of the hamlet Rivière-Mauvais and crossing two series of rapids, to the confluence (coming from the west) of the Cachée river;
- 4.8 kilometres (3.0 mi) towards the south-east in a deep valley crossing three series of rapids, up to a bend in the river;
- 4.2 kilometres (2.6 mi) towards the northeast starting in a small plain, then in a steep valley, forming a small loop towards the east, cutting a forest road and passing between two mountains whose summit reached 277 metres (909 ft) (east side) and another 331 metres (1,086 ft) (west side), to its mouth.

The mouth of the Mauvaise River spills onto the west bank of the Bras du Nord. This confluence is located at:

- 6.4 kilometres (4.0 mi) north-west of the route 365 bridge which passes through downtown Saint-Raymond;
- 4.3 kilometres (2.7 mi) east of the center of the hamlet "Rivière-Mauvaise";
- 50.6 kilometres (31.4 mi) north of the confluence of the Sainte-Anne River and the Saint-Laurent River.

From its mouth, the Mauvaise River flows over 11.7 kilometres (7.3 mi) generally towards the south, following the course of the Bras du Nord; then the current goes down on 76.0 kilometres (47.2 mi) generally towards the south and the southwest by following the course of the Sainte-Anne River, until the northwest bank of the St. Lawrence River.

== Toponymy ==
The term "Mauvais" constitutes a family name of French origin. This term, taken adjectively, was given to the feminine in French.

The toponym "rivière Mauvaise" was formalized on December 5, 1968, at the Place Names Bank of the Commission de toponymie du Québec.

== See also ==
- Sainte-Anne River (Mauricie)
- List of rivers of Quebec

== Bibliography ==
- CAPSA (2014). Plans directeurs de l'eau des secteurs d'intervention de la zone de gestion de la CAPSA: Sainte-Anne, Portneuf et La Chevrotière (English: Water master plans for the intervention sectors of the CAPSA management area: Sainte-Anne, Portneuf and La Chevrotière) (PDF) (in French). Quebec: CAPSA. p. 691. Archived from the original (PDF) on 2019-02-14.
