= Rich Sirois =

Canadian ice hockey player

- Born: March 10, 1957 (age 68) Montreal, Quebec, Canada
- Height: 6 ft 0 in (183 cm)
- Weight: 181 lb (82 kg; 12 st 13 lb)
- Position: Goaltender
- Caught: Left
- Played for: Milwaukee Admirals; Peoria Prancers
- NHL draft: 86th overall, 1977; Buffalo Sabres; 122nd overall, 1978; Washington Capitals
- Playing career: 1977–1984

Richard Sirois (born March 10, 1957) is a Canadian former professional ice hockey player.

During his first season in the Quebec Major Junior Hockey League (QMJHL) with the Sherbrooke Castors his team won the President's Cup and advanced to the 1975 Memorial Cup finals, where they lost to the Toronto Marlboros, the Ontario champions. After being traded the following season, he played his final year in the QMJHL with Laval National, and with 69 games led the league in games played by a goalie.

He was drafted in the fifth round, 85th overall by the Buffalo Sabres in the 1977 NHL amateur draft. He played one season with the Milwaukee Admirals of the International Hockey League (IHL). The following season he became a free agent and was drafted again by the Washington Capitals in the 1978 Draft. He went on to play one season in the Swiss National League A in 1978. He returned to North America and played six more seasons in the IHL with the Milwaukee Admirals and Peoria Prancers. Sirois signed as a free agent with the St. Louis Blues in the 1982 NHL playoff season but never played in the NHL.

Sirois and his older brother Bob were the owners of the Montreal Roadrunners of Roller Hockey International (RHI), and founders of Continental Inline Hockey League from 1990 to 1995.

== Playing career ==
Sirois played 286 games and won a record 119 games with the Admirals in the International Hockey League and was a three-time All Star. Sirois leads Milwaukee in games played by a goaltender (285). He wore jersey #57. In 1969, Sirois was the goalie for the LSA Montreal team that represented Team Canada as a Pee Wee in the 1969-70 Hockey Tour Exhibition in France.
