= Bras du Nord (Sainte-Anne River tributary) =

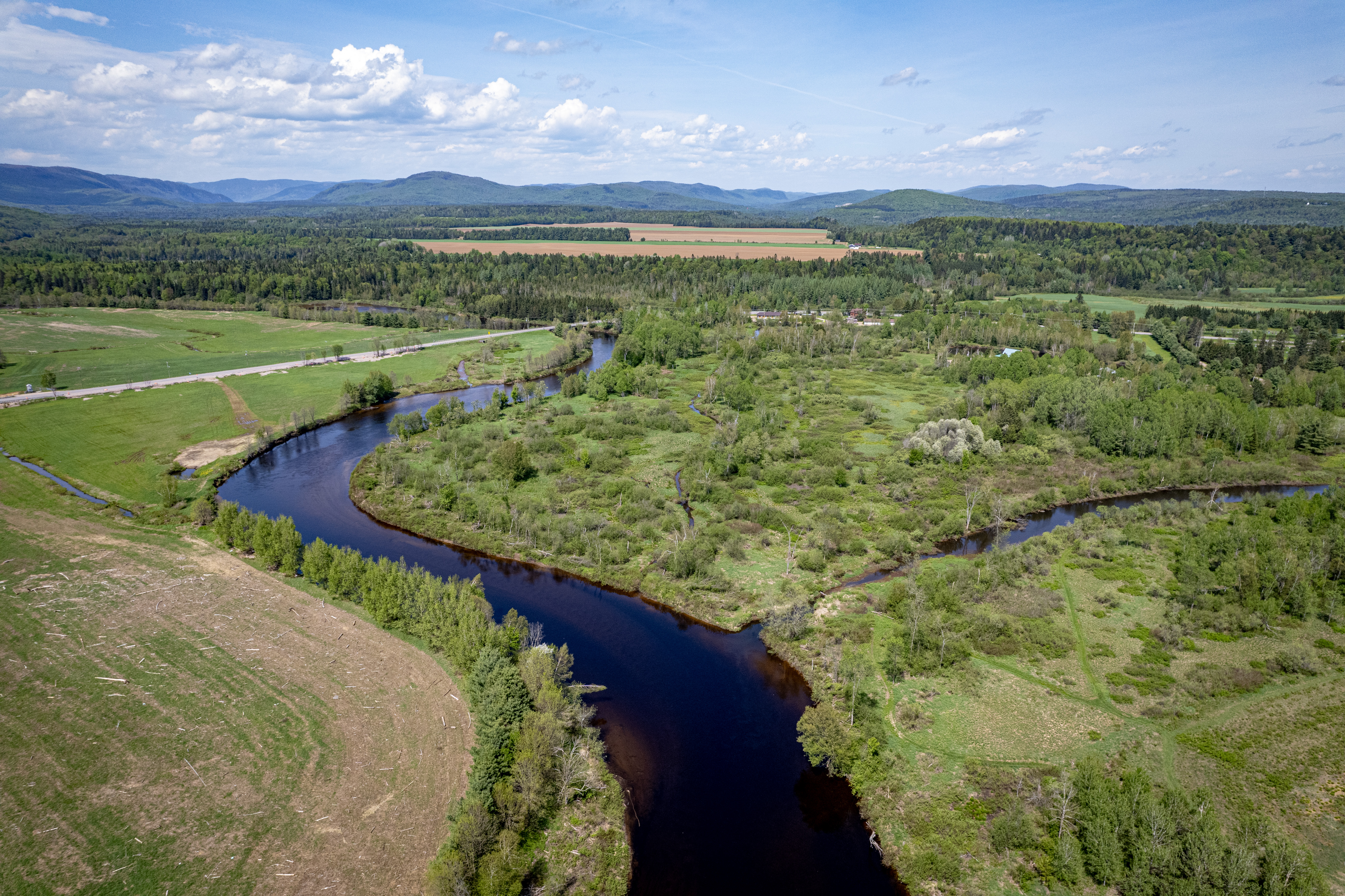

- Location within Quebec

Location
- Country: Canada
- Province: Quebec
- Region: Capitale-Nationale
- Regional County Municipality: Portneuf Regional County Municipality
- Municipalities: Saint-Raymond

Physical characteristics
- Source: Confluence of Sainte-Anne Ouest River and Neilson River
  - location: Saint-Raymond, MRC Portneuf Regional County Municipality
  - coordinates: 47°05′21″N 71°53′23″W
  - elevation: 199 m (653 ft)
- Mouth: Sainte-Anne River
  - location: Saint-Raymond
  - coordinates: 46°53′13″N 71°51′21″W
  - elevation: 134 m (440 ft)
- Length: 35.6 km (22.1 mi)
- Basin size: 777.39 hectares (1,921.0 acres)
- Discharge
  - location: Saint-Raymond

Basin features
- Tributaries
  - left: (Upward from the mouth) Ruisseau non identifié, décharge d'un lac non identifié, décharge des lacs Rita et Alain, ruisseau non identifié, décharge d'un ensemble de lacs non identifiés, décharge d'un lac, Écartée Rivere, rivière de la Roche Plate (décharge du lac Lafrance), décharge des lacs du Parcours et Nidoreux (hameau Pine Lake), décharge du Lac du Culmen, décharge d'un petit lac, Neilson River.
  - right: (Upward from the mouth) Décharge de trois lacs, décharge de trois lacs, décharge d'un lac, décharge d'un lac, ruisseau du Rang Sainte-Croix, décharge de deux lacs, décharge d'un lac, décharge de deux petits lacs, décharge d'un lac, décharge d'un lac, Mauvaise River, décharge d'un petit lac, décharge d'un petit lac, décharge de trois petits lacs, décharge d'un petit lac, décharge d'un petit lac, décharge de trois petits lacs, décharge d'un petit lac, décharge de deux petits lacs, décharge du lac Préseau, décharge d'un petit lac, décharge du lac Merché, ruisseau, décharge de 2 petits lacs, décharge du Lac de la Hauteur, Sainte-Anne Ouest River.

The Bras du Nord is a tributary of the Sainte-Anne River flowing in the town of Saint-Raymond, in the MRC of Portneuf, in the administrative region of Capitale-Nationale, in Quebec, in Canada.

The Bras du Nord is mainly served by the rang Saguenay road which runs on the east bank of the river.

The main economic activities in the sector are forestry and recreational tourism activities.

The surface of the North Arm (except the rapids zones) is generally frozen from the beginning of December to the end of March, but the safe circulation on the ice is generally made from the end of December to the beginning of March.

== Geography ==
The Bras du Nord rises at the confluence of the rivers Sainte-Anne Ouest and Neilson (altitude 199 metres (653 ft)). From this confluence, the Bras du Nord flows for 35.6 kilometres (22.1 mi) to the south, generally in the forest zone, sometimes agricultural at the end of the route, with a drop of 65 metres (213 ft) according to the following segments:

Upper course of the North Arm (segment of 23.9 kilometres (14.9 mi))

- 4.1 kilometres (2.5 mi) first towards the south, then branching south-east to the outlet (coming from the north) of a group of lakes in the hamlet Pine Lake;
- 3.4 kilometres (2.1 mi) towards the south-east in a deep valley passing between two mountains to the rivière de la Roche Plate (coming from the north);
- 6.5 kilometres (4.0 mi) forming a large loop to the Écartée river (coming from the northeast);
- 4.8 kilometres (3.0 mi) by forming three loops towards the west to a road bridge;
- 5.1 kilometres (3.2 mi) towards the south forming a hook towards the west at the start of the segment and crossing seven series of rapids, up to the Mauvaise River (coming from the southwest);

Lower reaches of the North Arm (segment of 11.7 kilometres (7.3 mi))

- 6.4 kilometres (4.0 mi) towards the south-east by forming a large loop towards the east on 4.9 kilometres (3.0 mi), up to a river bend;
- 1.9 kilometres (1.2 mi) to the south by crossing a rapids zone to the Rang Sainte-Croix stream (coming from the southwest);
- 1.8 kilometres (1.1 mi) towards the south-east, by forming a hook towards the south-west, collecting the discharge (coming from the east) of a lake and bypassing seven small islands, up to at the Noir bridge (route 365);
- 1.6 kilometres (0.99 mi) southwards around an island having a length of 0.3 kilometres (0.19 mi) to its mouth.

The Bras du Nord flows onto the northwest bank of the Sainte-Anne River at 1.0 kilometre (0.62 mi) downstream from the route 365 which passes through downtown Saint-Raymond. From this confluence, the current descends on 76.0 kilometres (47.2 mi) generally towards the south and the southwest by following the course of the Sainte-Anne river, until the northwest bank of the St. Lawrence River.

== Toponymy ==
This toponym refers to its location north of the Sainte-Anne river. This toponym appears on the plan of a part of the seigneury of Bourg-Louis carried out by the surveyor Ignace-Pierre Déry, in 1851.

The toponym "Bras du Nord" was formalized on April 22, 2008, at the Place Names Bank of the Commission de toponymie du Québec.

== See also ==
- Portneuf Regional County Municipality
- Sainte-Anne Ouest River
- Neilson River
- Mauvaise River
- Écartée River
- Sainte-Anne River (Mauricie)
- List of rivers of Quebec

== Bibliography ==
- CAPSA (2014). Water master plans of the intervention sectors of the CAPSA management area: Sainte-Anne, Portneuf and La Chevrotière (PDF) (in French). Quebec: CAPSA. p. 691. Archived from the original (PDF) on 2019-02-14.
