= Saint-Raymond, Quebec =

Saint-Raymond
- City
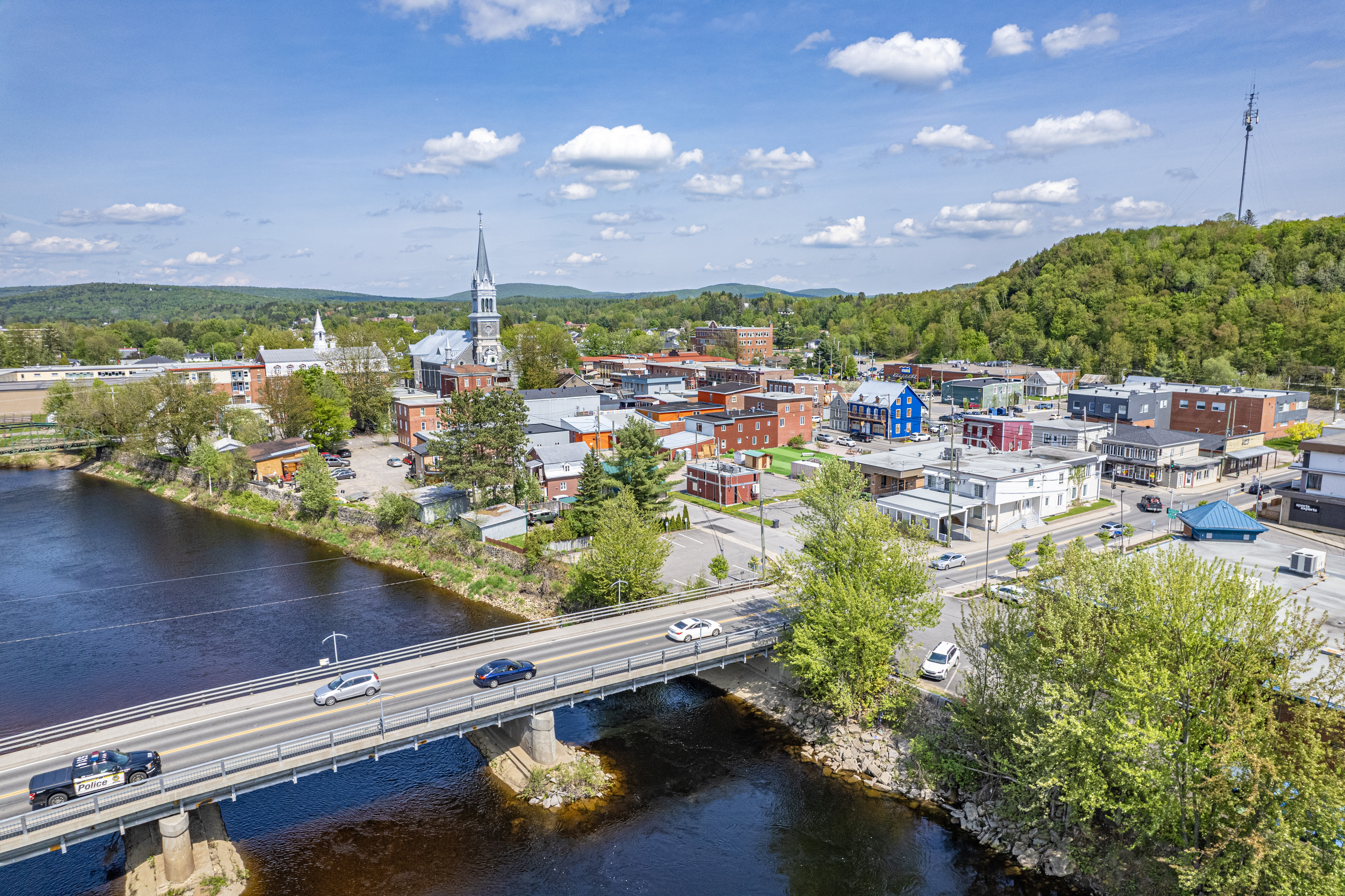

- Seal Coat of arms
- Nickname: Automobile City
- Motto: Pax in veritate (Peace in truth)
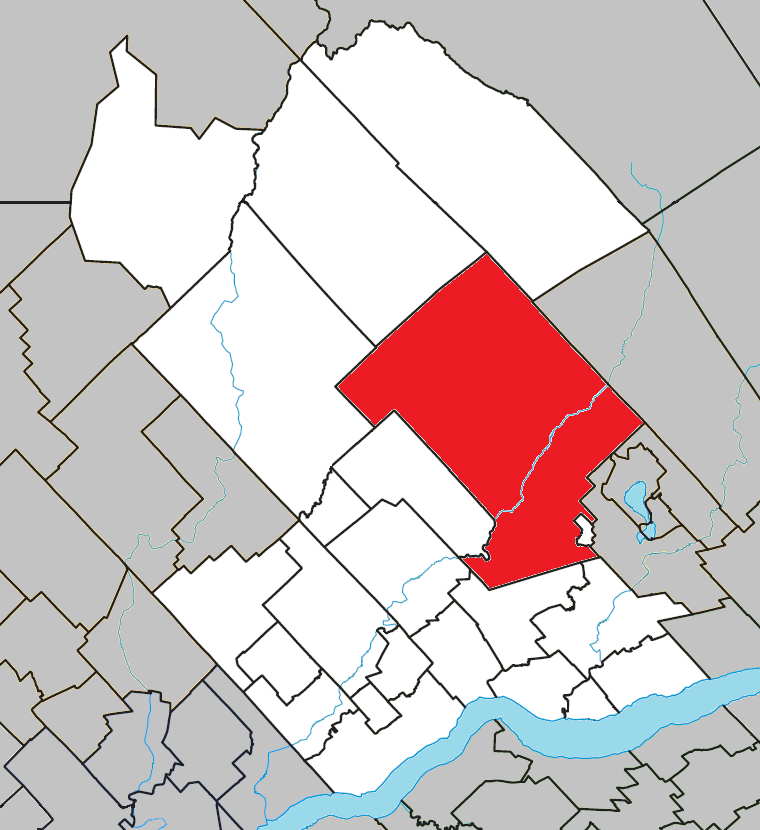
- Location within Portneuf RCM

- Location in central Quebec
- Coordinates: 46°54′N 71°50′W
- Country: Canada
- Province: Quebec
- Region: Capitale-Nationale
- RCM: Portneuf
- Constituted: March 29, 1995

Government
  - Mayor: Claude Duplain
  - Fed. riding: Saint-Augustin—Portneuf—Jacques-Cartier
  - Prov. riding: Portneuf

Area
  - Total: 698.19 km^{2} (269.57 sq mi)
  - Land: 666.20 km^{2} (257.22 sq mi)
  - Urban: 4.37 km^{2} (1.69 sq mi)

Population (2021)
  - Total: 11,108
  - Density: 16.7/km^{2} (43/sq mi)
  - Urban: 3,057
  - Urban density: 699.2/km^{2} (1,811/sq mi)
  - Pop (2016-21): ▲7.2%
  - Dwellings: 5,752
- Time zone: UTC−5 (EST)
  - Summer (DST): UTC−4 (EDT)
- Postal code(s): G3L
- Area codes: 418, 581
- Highways: R-354; R-365; R-367
- Website: villesaintraymond.com

Saint-Raymond (French pronunciation: [sɛ̃ ʁɛmɔ̃]), also called Saint-Raymond de Portneuf ([sɛ̃ ʁɛmɔ̃ də pɔʁnœf]), is a city in Quebec, Canada, located about 63 kilometres (39 mi) north-west of Quebec City. It is the largest city in population and area of the Portneuf Regional County Municipality.

== History ==
=== First settlements ===
The seigniory of Bourg-Louis, which includes the territory of Saint-Raymond, was initially occupied by the Wendat. Their round hut was only a few feet away from the current location of the presbytery. The seigniory was jointly owned by Bernard-Antoine Panet and Peter Langlois. The two men encourage the colonization of Sainte-Anne river valley. Four couples from Ancienne-Lorette were the first to rise to the challenge:

- Alexis Cayer and Jane Skinner
- Pierre Plamondon and Louise Déry
- Pierre Duplain and Esther Robert
- Joson Déry and Marguerite Hamel

It was in the spring of 1831 that the four men first left their home for the land the Wendat had told them about. Once arrived, they shared the land among themselves. They spent the summers of 1831 and 1832 clearing the land. The four men went back to Ancienne-Lorette during the winters. In 1833, the women came with them to help prepare a permanent settlement. Other people subsequently came from the Ancienne-Lorette region.

As families arrived from l'Ancienne-Lorette, Irish communities developed in parallel in the Grand Rang sector. The first Scottish and Irish settlers arrived in the early 1830s. They came by sailboat to Quebec City, and were allocated lots in the seigniory of Bourg-Louis. Harriet Antill, an English-speaking woman married to Bernard-Antoine Panet, attracted hundreds of Irish people who were fleeing the famine in their country. The Irish colony soon built the Saint-Bartholomew chapel, two schools, a post office, a grain mill and a paper mill.

=== Formation of a town ===
In 1839, the mission counted 210 inhabitants. In February 1842, an assembly presided by Hugh Paisly, the parish priest of Sainte-Catherine, elected the first syndics who would represent the interests of the newly formed institution.

On 3 August 1844, archbishop Joseph Signay approved the canonical erection of Saint-Raymond in the seigniory of Bourg-Louis and the Gosford township. The parish was named Saint-Raymond Nonnat in honour of its patron saint Raymond Nonnatus.

Édouard Antrobus, the general overseer of roads (grand-voyer), traced the routes and organized municipal chores. A cadastral plan was prepared for lot allocation. The joyful hut (cabane joyeuse) built by Joseph Déry and his friends was used as a city hall. On its door appeared a billboard, which kept the population updated about current events.

Saint-Raymond was civilly erected on 18 June 1845. The taxpayers later elected their first council. The council elected Jacques Labranche as the first mayor.

The first city hall was built in 1903 next to where is now the Chalifour bridge. It was expanded in 1909 to include a reception room, an apartment for the security guard and an office for the secretary-treasurer.

The presbytery was built in 1846. It is located next to the church. It contains several rooms and was designed to accommodate the parish priest and his vicars, the maid, as well as visiting priests.

The postal service started in 1853. The post office was initially located in Siméon Matte's house, which is now occupied by the Buffalo resto-pub.

The Saint-Agricole chapel in the Saguenay rural district (le rang Saguenay) was built in 1860.

The red bridge (le pont rouge) was the first bridge and was built in 1875 at the end of the convent's street. Another bridge was inaugurated on 15 October 1889. The Premier of Quebec, Honoré Mercier, and the member of the National Assembly representing Portneuf, Jules Tessier, came to Saint-Raymond for the inauguration. The bridge was named the Tessier Bridge in honour of the representative. The red bridge was sold in an auction for $46 also in 1889.

A school system was developed in 1870. The schools in the village and in the rural districts provided elementary education only.

=== Churches ===
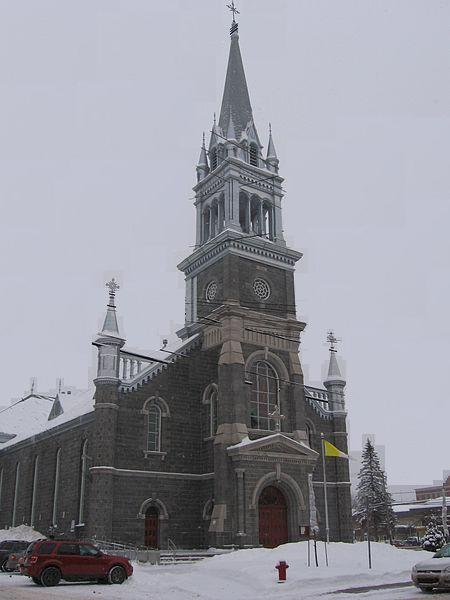
Church of Saint-Raymond built in 1900

The town’s principal historic churches are the Anglican St. Bartholomew’s Chapel (built 1837, inaugurated 1840) and the Roman Catholic parish of Saint‑Raymond‑Nonnat. English‑speaking settlers, notably Irish families who arrived in the Bourg‑Louis seigniory in the 1830s, established St. Bartholomew’s as the oldest Anglican place of worship in Portneuf. The Catholic mission in the Sainte‑Anne River valley was canonically erected as the parish of Saint‑Raymond‑Nonnat on 25 May 1842. A first Catholic chapel was built on the riverbank in 1844 (the cemetery and the first burial, on 28 September 1844, were originally adjacent to this chapel); that building was destroyed by fire on 10 January 1858 and replaced by a small granite church. After about forty years the second church proved too small for the growing congregation, and construction of the present neoclassical granite parish church, designed by Georges‑Émile Tanguay, architect of the city hall of Quebec City, and built with stone quarried at Rivière‑à‑Pierre, began in 1900 to the south of the earlier building; the cornerstone was blessed on 26 August 1900 and the first Mass in the new church was celebrated in 1902.

=== Wood industry ===
Logging started in 1850. Timber was brought to Sainte-Anne-de-la-Pérade by log drivers on the Sainte-Anne River. It was then sent to Quebec city by schooner.

The construction of a railroad in 1880 stimulated the growth of the wood industry. The first pulp and paper plant, owned by T.-L. Jackson, opened in 1888. Napoléon Piché opened the first large sawmills in 1890 and 1904. By 1900, Saint-Raymond counted 21 (mostly small) sawmills. Logging, log driving, and lumber production became important sectors of the economy.

=== Late 19th century ===
In 1886, the population had grown to 3807.

In 1895, a flood caused a lot of damage.

Saint-Raymond lost some of its territory when its smaller neighbours Sainte-Christine and Saint-Léonard were created, in 1895 and 1897 respectively.

As the number of pupils kept increasing, the Sisters of Charity convent (le couvent des Sœurs de la Charité) was erected in 1896.

To better fit people's needs, Saint-Raymond was divided in 1898 into two municipalities: the village and the parish.

On 25 June 1899, a fire started in the middle of the village. Forty houses burned, leaving sixty of the families living on Saint-Joseph street homeless. The houses were rebuilt within three months. The municipality later bought a fire pump and formed a volunteer firefighter program. On 12 June 1907, another fire started at Siméon Martel's house on Saint-Joseph street. Pushed by the wind, it reached Napoléon Moisan's house and other neighbouring houses. The firefighters' efforts limited the damage, but 20 houses were lost.

=== City development ===
The first bank in Saint-Raymond was the Halifax People's Bank (la Banque du Peuple d'Halifax). It was built in 1900. The building is now occupied by the store Pronature.

A hydro-electric dam was built on the Bras-du-Nord river in 1901. People referred to it as the pouvoir électrique, a word-to-word translation of the English electric power. The municipality bought the facility in 1914, and sold it to North Shore Power in 1924. The ruins of the dam can still be seen today at the place called the rapid of light (le rapide de la Lumière).

The Sainte-Marie hospital, a private maternity hospital, was the main hospital from 1955 to 1959. The hospital was a log home with two floors and was built where is now located the parking of the Lefebvre drugstore (la pharmacie Lefebvre). The Saint-Raymond hospital opened in 1959. The hospital then counted about 20 beds.

The Saint-Joseph college (le collège Saint-Joseph) was built in 1908. In 1916, it counted 182 students. In October 1928, a fire destroyed the top two floors. During a very cold day in December 1933, fire struck the college again, this time destroying it completely. The school was rebuilt.

The Marguerite d'Youville school, where children now go from kindergarten to the third grade, was built in 1960. Since 1972, high school education is given at the Louis-Jobin high school (l'école secondaire Louis-Jobin), which was initially named la polyvalente de Saint-Raymond.

Le cinéma Alouette, a movie theatre, was built in 1947.

A credit union (caisse populaire) was started in 1934.

A new post office was built in 1938.

The municipal ski centre opened in 1974 and offered 5 trails, a lift, 64 kilometres (40 mi) of cross-country trails, and a 24 by 23 feet (7.3 by 7.0 m) chalet. A tubing facility was installed at the centre in 1997.

With money collected during a telethon, an arena was built in 1975.

The Big Log festival (le festival de la Grosse Bûche) is a popular local family event occurring in July since 1976.

In 1992, Saint-Raymond celebrated its 150th anniversary.

In 1994, the rails were removed from the railroad to construct the Jacques-Cartier / Portneuf recreation trail. The trail was finished in 1997.

When the city and the parish fused in 1995, Saint-Raymond became the most populous city of Portneuf.

Three numbered provincial roads converge to St-Raymond, Route 365, Route 367, and Route 354.

== Geography ==
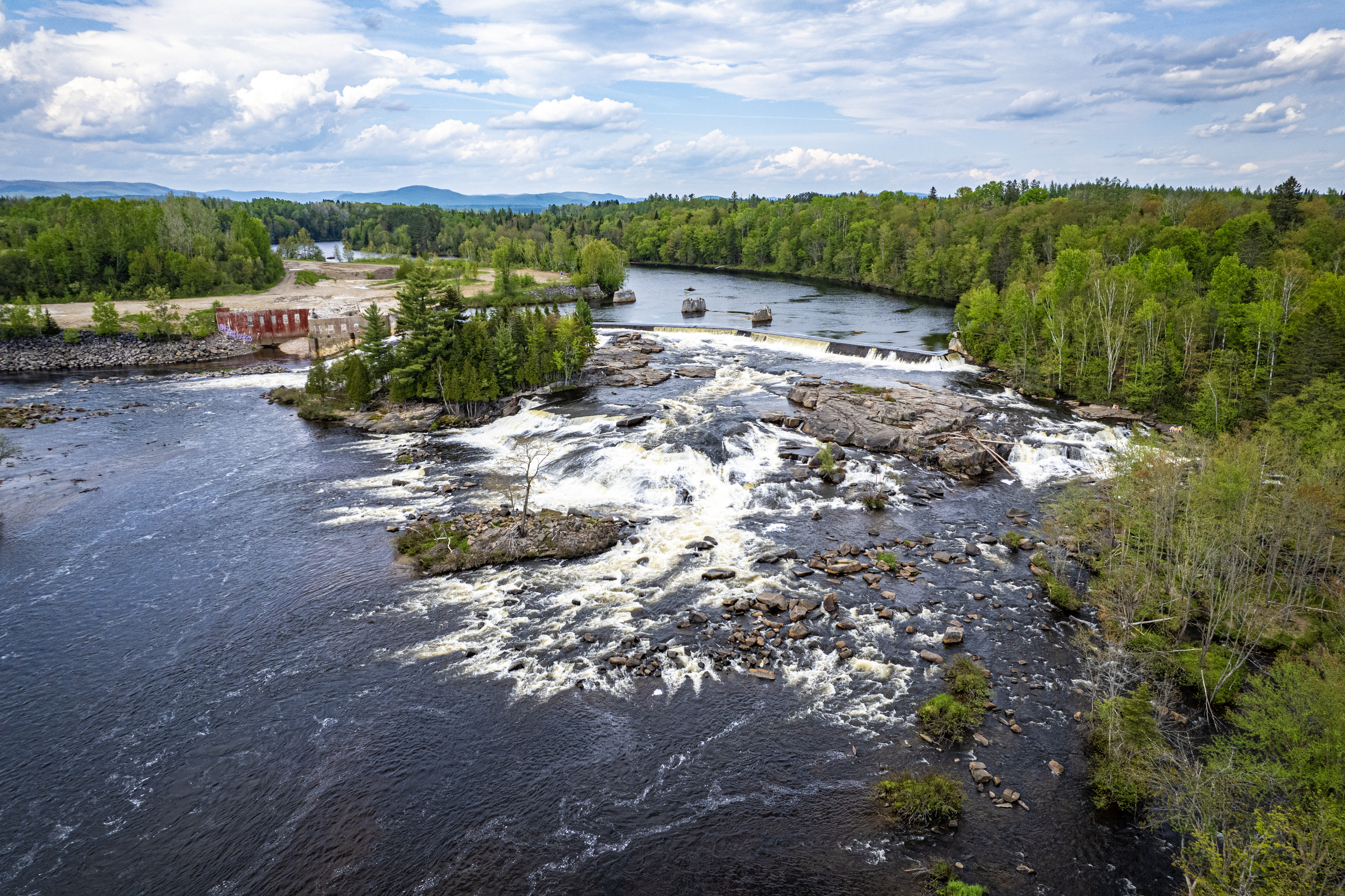
Panet Falls

Saint-Raymond is located on either side of the Sainte-Anne River. The municipal territory extends far to the north and has a total area of 670 square kilometres (260 sq mi). Most of the municipality is made up of forests where several chalets are built.

=== Climate ===
Climate data for Saint-Raymond
Month	Jan	Feb	Mar	Apr	May	Jun	Jul	Aug	Sep	Oct	Nov	Dec	Year
Record high °C (°F)	11.5 (52.7)	12.0 (53.6)	18.9 (66.0)	26.5 (79.7)	31.1 (88.0)	34.0 (93.2)	36.7 (98.1)	36.1 (97.0)	33.5 (92.3)	25.6 (78.1)	21.0 (69.8)	12.0 (53.6)	36.7 (98.1)
Mean daily maximum °C (°F)	−7.8 (18.0)	−5.2 (22.6)	0.7 (33.3)	8.3 (46.9)	16.6 (61.9)	21.7 (71.1)	23.8 (74.8)	22.6 (72.7)	17.5 (63.5)	10.2 (50.4)	2.9 (37.2)	−4.2 (24.4)	8.9 (48.0)
Daily mean °C (°F)	−13.3 (8.1)	−11.1 (12.0)	−5.1 (22.8)	3.0 (37.4)	10.4 (50.7)	15.5 (59.9)	18.0 (64.4)	16.9 (62.4)	12.1 (53.8)	5.7 (42.3)	−0.9 (30.4)	−8.8 (16.2)	3.5 (38.3)
Mean daily minimum °C (°F)	−18.8 (−1.8)	−17.0 (1.4)	−10.9 (12.4)	−2.3 (27.9)	4.1 (39.4)	9.3 (48.7)	12.2 (54.0)	11.2 (52.2)	6.7 (44.1)	1.1 (34.0)	−4.7 (23.5)	−13.3 (8.1)	−1.9 (28.6)
Record low °C (°F)	−42.5 (−44.5)	−38.3 (−36.9)	−36.0 (−32.8)	−20.6 (−5.1)	−8.9 (16.0)	−2.5 (27.5)	1.0 (33.8)	−1.0 (30.2)	−7.0 (19.4)	−12.2 (10.0)	−25.0 (−13.0)	−38.0 (−36.4)	−42.5 (−44.5)
Average precipitation mm (inches)	92.2 (3.63)	81.2 (3.20)	77.3 (3.04)	103.9 (4.09)	126.8 (4.99)	137.8 (5.43)	162.4 (6.39)	124.2 (4.89)	156.9 (6.18)	143.2 (5.64)	135.7 (5.34)	118.0 (4.65)	1,459.8 (57.47)
Source: Environment Canada

== Demographics ==
In the 2021 Census of Population conducted by Statistics Canada, Saint-Raymond had a population of 11,108 living in 4,972 of its 5,752 total private dwellings, a change of 7.2% from its 2016 population of 10,358. With a land area of 666.2 km^{2} (257.2 sq mi), it had a population density of 16.7/km^{2} (43.2/sq mi) in 2021.

Historical census populations – Saint-Raymond, Quebec

Year	Pop.	±%
1901	1,272	—
1911	1,653	+30.0%
1921	1,693	+2.4%
1931	1,772	+4.7%
1941	2,157	+21.7%
1951	3,139	+45.5%
1956	3,502	+11.6%

Year	Pop.	±%
1961	3,931	+12.3%
1966	4,318	+9.8%
1971	4,036	−6.5%
1976	3,742	−7.3%
1981	3,605	−3.7%
1986	3,422	−5.1%
1991	3,373	−1.4%

Year	Pop.	±%
1996	8,733	+158.9%
2001	8,836	+1.2%
2006	9,273	+4.9%
2011	9,615	+3.7%
2016	10,358	+7.7%
2021	11,108	+7.2%

2016 Population figure based on revised count. Population counts are not adjusted for boundary changes and merger.
Source: Statistics Canada

Mother tongue (2021):

- English as first language: 1.0%
- French as first language: 97.7%
- English and French as first languages: 0.7%
- Other as first language: 0.5%

== Economy ==
Saint-Raymond developed mostly around the wood industry. Today, the sawmills and the wood drying, wood treating, plywood, and paper plants still play an essential role in the economy of the region, as well as the sugar shack, where maple syrup is produced. The area is noted as the home of international prize-winning cheese maker Alexis de Portneuf.
