= Propre River (Quebec) =

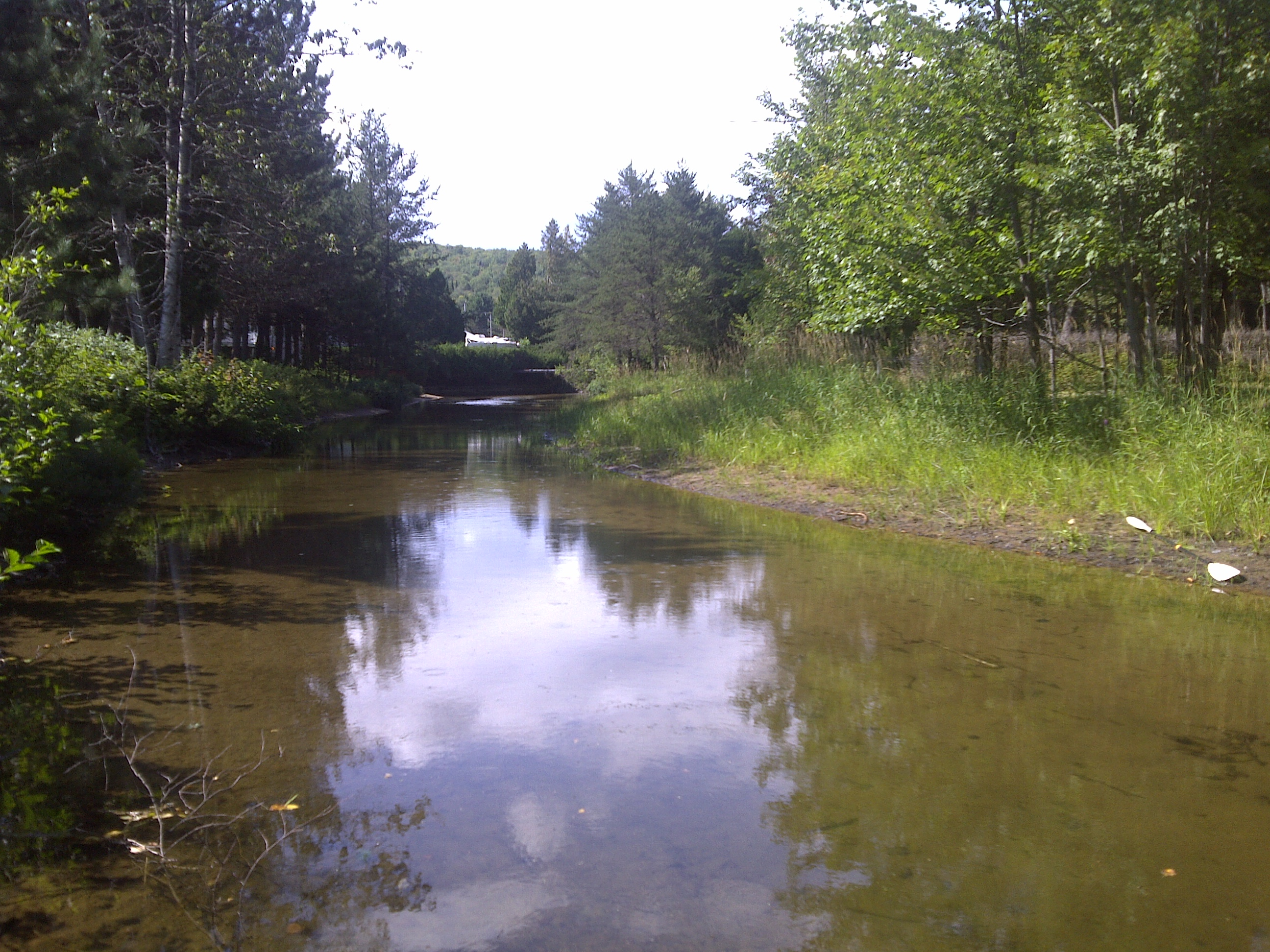
- River Propre, located in Lac-aux-Sables, QC, Canada. Photo of August 11, 2013, taken from camping site at a river elbow close to its source.

Location
- Country: Canada

Physical characteristics
- Source
  - location: Lac aux Sables
  - coordinates: 46.84972°N 72.41917°W
- Mouth
  - location: Batiscan River, Lac-aux-Sables (Quebec), Canada
- Length: 6.7 km (4.2 mi)(length including 0.5 km (0.31 mi) to cross Lake Huron)

Basin features
- Basin: Batiscanie

The Propre River (French: Rivière Propre) is located in the municipality of Lac-aux-Sables in Regional County Municipality of Mékinac Regional County Municipality, in the administrative region Mauricie, in the province of Quebec, Canada. The Propre River watershed is part of the Batiscanie. It is 6.7 km long.

== Geography ==
The river has its source in Lac-aux-Sables, located northwest of the main village in the area campgrounds. On its way downward, the river passes near Petit Lac Noir (Little Black Lake). After running for 2.8 km, the Propre River flows into the southeastern part of Huron Lake, located in the town of Lac-aux-Sables between the main village and Hervey-Jonction. The river resumes flowing south from the southwestern point of Huron Lake.

From Huron Lake, the Propre River flows south-east, passing under the road bridge of Chemin du Lac Huron, then under a railway bridge and under the Route 153 road bridge between Sainte-Thècle to Lac-aux-Sables. This bridge is characterized by the "Côte de la Propre" (bank of the Propre) which was dangerous to traffic until the construction of a new bridge and rehabilitation of the road. Below the bridge (close to the road), the river flows into a large waterfall. Once at the top of this fall, a dam was built to operate a saw mill owned by Mr. Champagne.

The segment between Lake Huron and the Route 153 is 2.8 km and the last segment, between the road and the Batiscan River, is 0.74 km.

Propre River is a tributary of the right bank of the Batiscan River. Its mouth is located 3.1 km upstream of the mouth of Tawachiche River and 1.3 km downstream from the bridge of Rang Price (located near the village of Lac-aux-Sables), spanning over the Batiscan River.

== Toponymy ==
The name "Propre River" was recorded on December 5, 1968, in the register of place names in the Commission de toponymie du Québec (Geographical Names Board of Quebec).

== See also ==
- Batiscanie, Quebec
- Batiscan River
- Tawachiche River
- Lac-aux-Sables
- Hervey-Jonction, Quebec
