= Batiscan River Park =

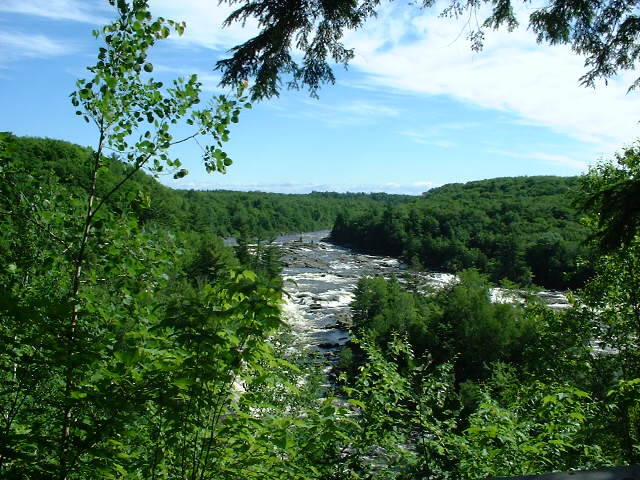
- "Chutes des Ailes" (Wings Falls)
- Interactive map of Batiscan River Park
- Area: 362 hectares (890 acres)
- Established: 1992
- Website: "Batiscan River Park" (in French). Archived from the original on 2013-10-22.

Batiscan River Park
- Interactive map of Batiscan River Park
- Nearest city: Trois-Rivières, Les Chenaux, Quebec, Canada
- Coordinates: 46°33′53″N 72°24′29″W
- WDPA: 307083

The Parc de la Rivière Batiscan (Batiscan River Park) is a quasi provincial park in the province of Quebec, in Canada. Located in the municipalities of Saint-Narcisse of Saint-Stanislas and Sainte-Geneviève-de-Batiscan. It is maintained by a local council representing the three surrounding local towns. Established in 1992, recreational and tourist park covers 362 acres extending on both sides of the Batiscan River.

== Main recreational activities ==
The mandate of this Batiscanie regional park is focused on conservation and environmental education. The park has 25 km of marked trails. Several ecological and historical interpretation panels will help educate and raise awareness among visitors.

Wilderness enthusiasts can go hiking, mountain biking, canoeing and camping (rustic, semi-finished, furnished, yurt and prospectors tents). In addition, three rustic shelters are available for rental year round.

Interpretation rooms with entertainment are available to visitors, depending on the season. By Via Batiscan, enthusiasts can practice on zip lines, via ferrata and tree trails.

The main entrances to the park are via: Sainte-Geneviève-de-Batiscan, Saint-Narcisse and Saint-Stanislas. The park accepts domestic dogs.

== See also ==
- Batiscanie
- Batiscan River
- Rivière des Chutes
- Saint-Narcisse
- Saint-Stanislas)
- Sainte-Geneviève-de-Batiscan
- Lordship of Batiscan
- Batiscan, Quebec
- Regional Park (Quebec)
