= Batiscan River =

Batiscan River Rivière Batiscan - Ektuhnthe - Patiskô
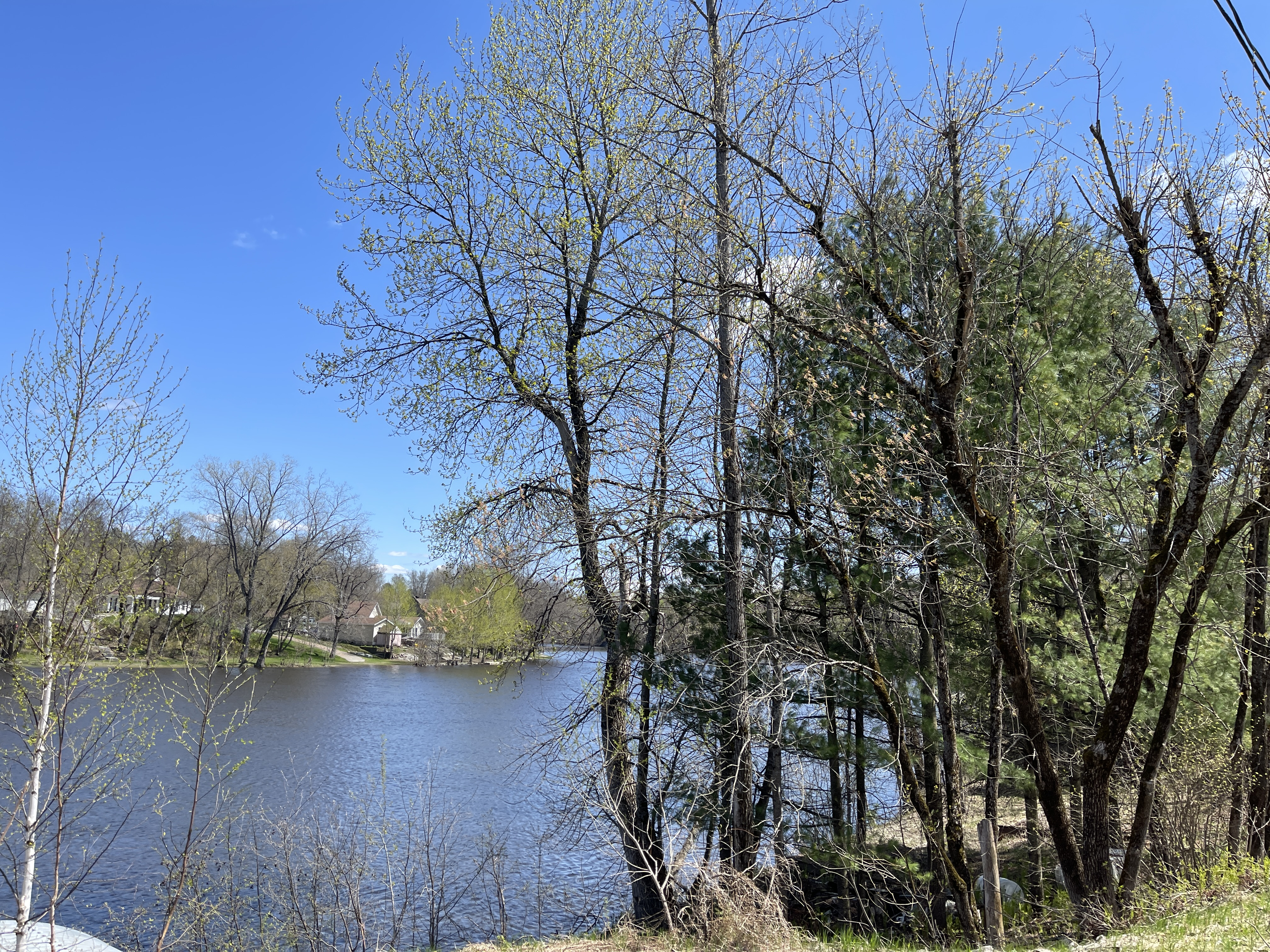
- At the mouth of the Lime River, from bridge P-01566, route de la Pointe-Trudel, Sainte-Geneviève-de-Batiscan

Location
- Country: Canada
- Province: Quebec
- Region: Mauricie

Physical characteristics
- Source: Édouard Lake
  - location: Lac-Édouard, Quebec
  - coordinates: 47°38′46″N 72°17′50″W
  - elevation: 363 m (1,191 ft)
- Mouth: Saint Lawrence River
  - location: Saint Lawrence River at Batiscan
  - coordinates: 46°31′13″N 72°14′15″W
  - elevation: 5 m (16 ft)
- Length: 196 km (122 mi)
- Basin size: 4,690 km^{2} (1,810 sq mi)
- Discharge
  - average: 96 m^{3}/s (3,400 cu ft/s)

Basin features
- Tributaries
  - left: (Upward from the mouth) Rivière aux Éclairs, Rivière à Moïse, Rivière Miguick, Rivière à Pierre, Rivière à Veillet
  - right: (Upward from the mouth) Rivière Jeannotte, Rivière Serpentine, Rivière Propre, Rivière Tawachiche, Rivière Pierre-Paul, Rivière des Envies, Rivière des Chutes, Rivière à la Lime

Batiscan River (French pronunciation: [batiskɑ̃]) has its source in the region of Lac Édouard, in the Laurentians Mountains, the Batiscan River flows over a length of 177 km. It receives water from numerous tributaries, including, in its upper reach, the Rivière aux Éclairs and the Jeannotte River. In its downstream part, it waters Saint-Narcisse and Sainte-Geneviève-de-Batiscan before flowing into the St. Lawrence River at Batiscan.

== Toponymy ==
The river was named in 1602 by Samuel de Champlain. He reported in 1610 that it was named for an Algonquin chief of the same name; however, this name was in use by Amerindian natives before the arrival of the first French explorers. The name "Batiscan" has been interpreted differently by various sources. Father Charles Arnaud argued that the name meant "steam cloud or light", or possibly "spray of dried meat". According to Pierre-Georges Roy the name means "who rushes to his mouth", which has been observed in the past. According to Father Albert Lacombe the name came from the Atikamekw term meaning "hoof or pending"; according to Father Joseph-Étienne Guinard, it derived from the cry "patiskam", meaning "stumble".

== Geography ==
=== Course ===
The Batiscan River begins its course at 363 metres (1,191 ft) of altitude in the Laurentian Mountains, in Lake Édouard, which is located in the Municipality of Lake Édouard (Haute-Mauricie). Lake Édouard is also the source of the Jeannotte River, which joins the Batiscan River after a course of 48 kilometres (30 mi).

Starting from Lake Édouard, the Batiscan River flows 9.3 kilometres (5.8 mi) before flowing successively through three lakes in the centre of which is the Lake of the Cross (Lac-Édouard). The river courses about 2.1 kilometres (1.3 mi) across the lakes. Then the river flows another unit 0.9 kilometres (0.56 mi) before passing through another lake, which also receives the discharge from the north of the sub-watershed Lac aux Biscuits. This northern sub-basin is considered as the second head of the river.

The Seigneurie du Triton, built in 1897 on the edge of Lake of the Cross, administers a hunting and fishing on 42.8 km^{2} (16.5 sq mi) space. This outfitter is one of the oldest clubs in private hunting and fishing in Quebec. The outfitter offers several activities including interpretive trails for nature walks and canoe, visits to beaver habitat and spawning (breeding trout), visiting the Triton station, pedal boating, and swimming. In this area, several hiking trails are maintained by the Society of Wildlife and Parks of Quebec, including linking the Lac aux Biscuits.

In the first segment 25 kilometres (16 mi) of its course, the Batiscan River flows through eight lakes (several being made by the swelling of the river) including two smallest.

Batiscan Lake is the second head of the Batiscan River. This elongated lake which is located in the MRC de La Jacques-Cartier (the unorganized territory of Lac-Croche). Batiscan Lake is especially fed by Croche River, lies outside the southwestern boundary of the Laurentian Wildlife Reserve. This lake discharges into the "Rivière aux éclairs" (Lightning River), which runs westward for 15 km (9.3 mi) before flowing into the Batiscan River.

From Lake of the Cross, the Batiscan River flows successively in a wilderness (the limit of the Zec Jeannotte and Laurentides Wildlife Reserve), and the Portneuf Wildlife Reserve. Then the river descends through Rivière-à-Pierre (western boundary of the municipality), Notre-Dame-de-Montauban, Quebec, Lac-aux-Sables, Sainte-Thècle, Quebec (Eastern limit of the municipality), Saint-Adelphe, Quebec, Saint-Stanislas, Saint-Narcisse, Quebec (limit of the municipality) Sainte-Geneviève-de-Batiscan, Quebec and Batiscan, Quebec. Batiscan flows mainly south on 196 kilometres (122 mi) and joined the St. Lawrence River up to Batiscan, Quebec.

The river runs through a mostly forested area from its source to the bridge over railway at Saint-Adelphe (with the exception of some agricultural areas close to St-Alphonse and Price rank, Lac-aux-Sables), and in the vicinity of Rousseau Road north of town Notre-Dame-de-Montauban and Main Street (south of the same village.) The rest of the course of the Batiscan is predominantly agricultural (photos).

Batiscan River, Upstream to Downstream

- Forest sectors
Notre-Dame-de-Montauban - Sainte-Geneviève-de-Batiscan

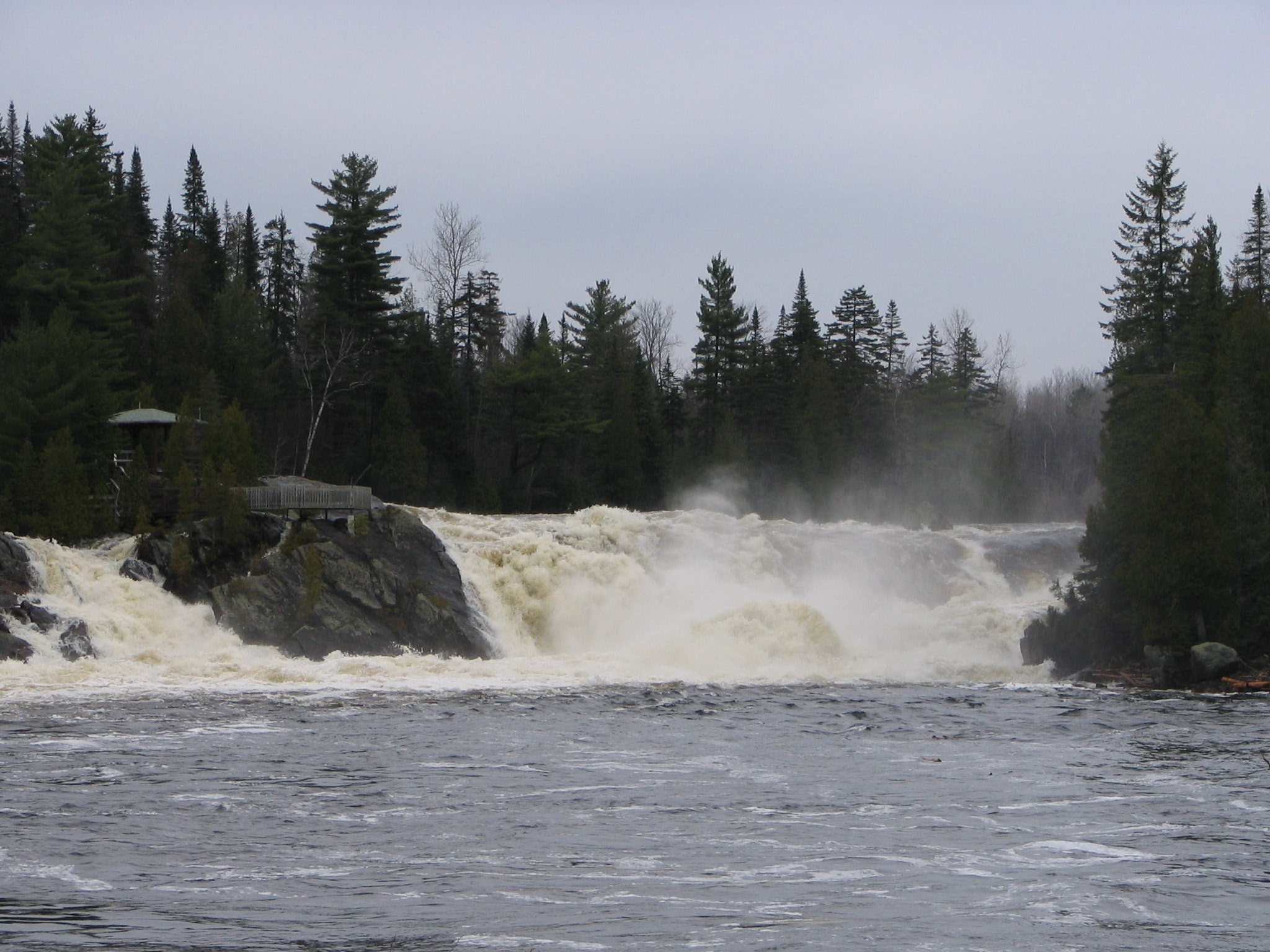
Chutes-de-Montauban Parc

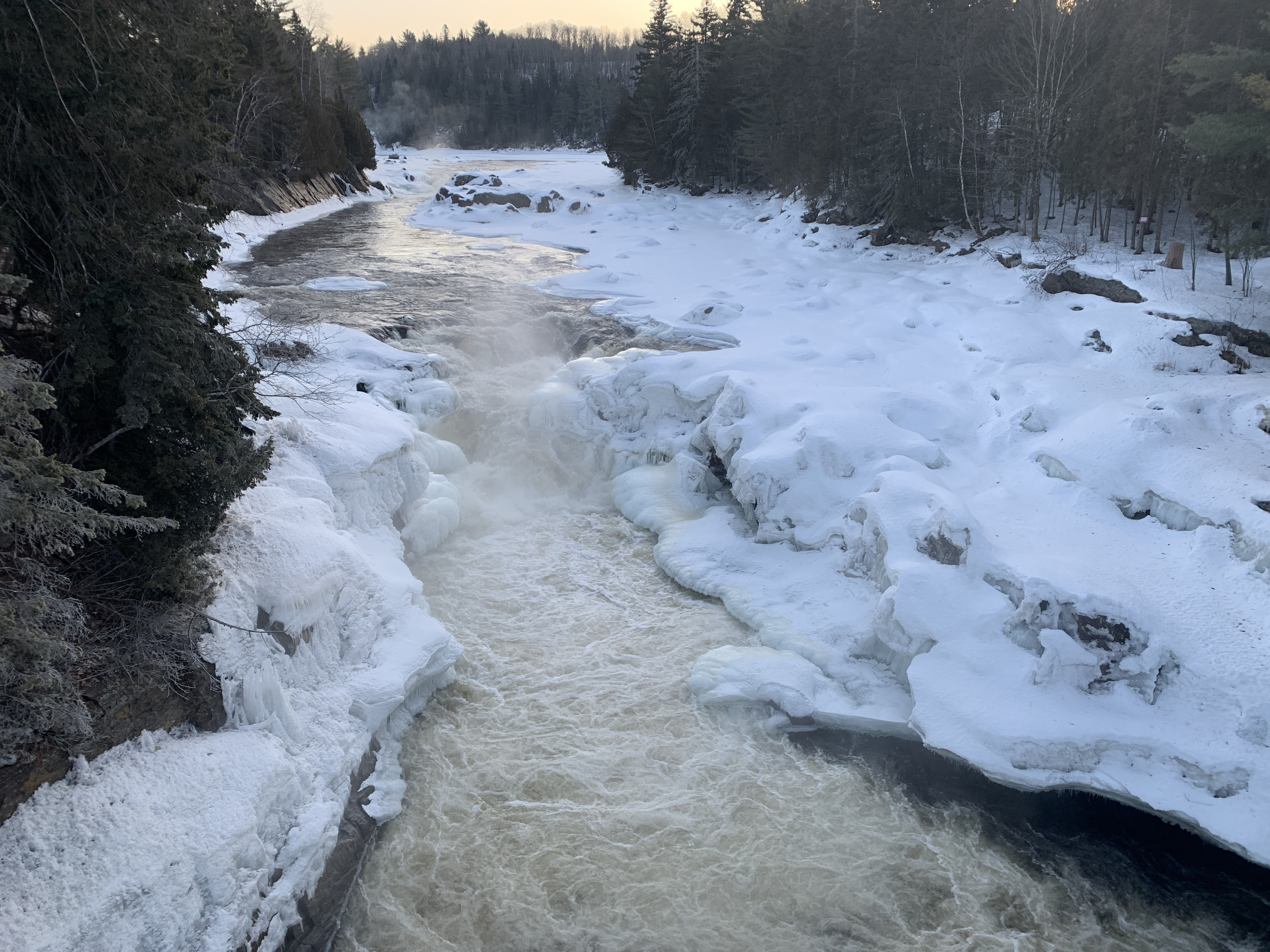
Spring flood

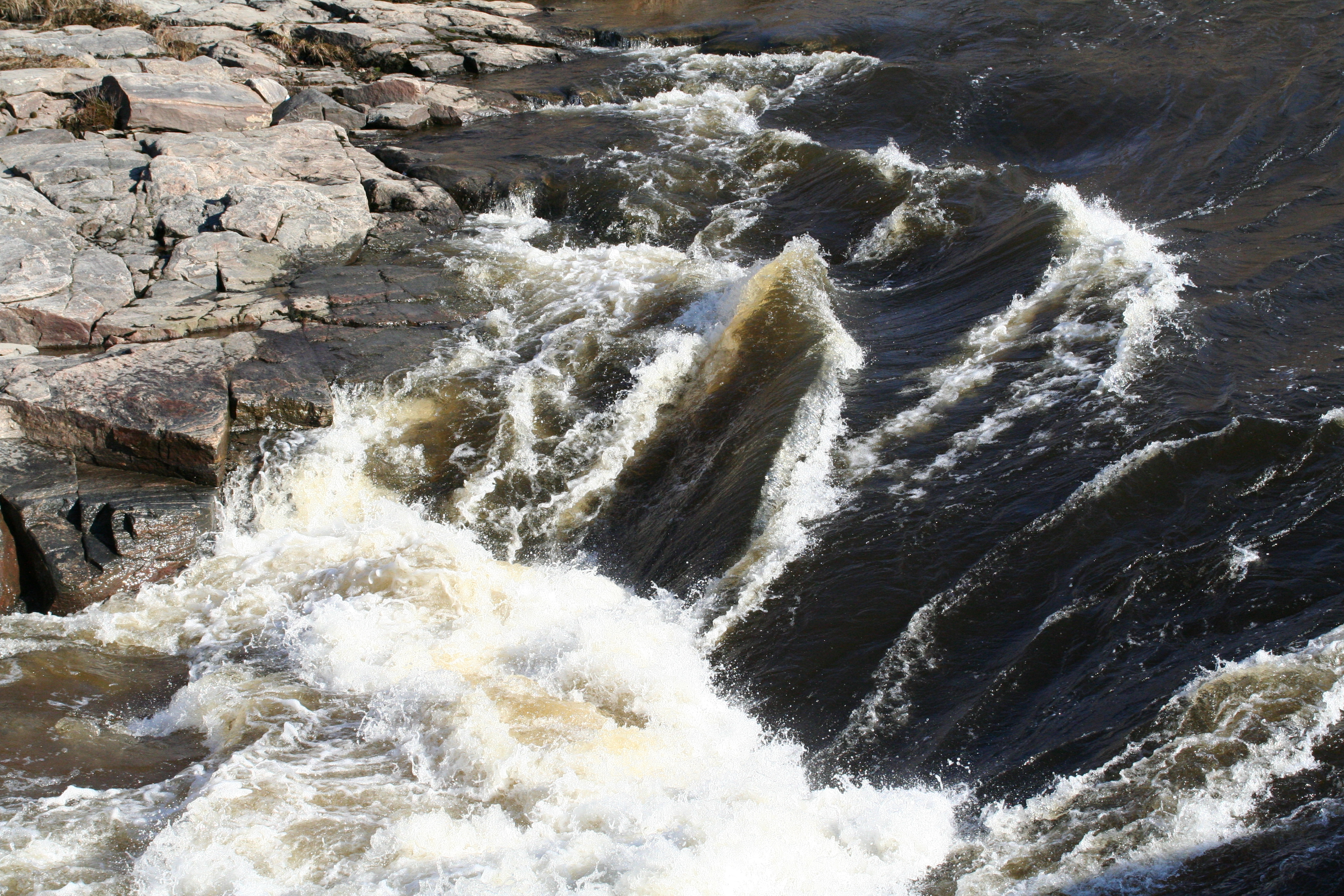
Batiscan River Park, West Bank Trail

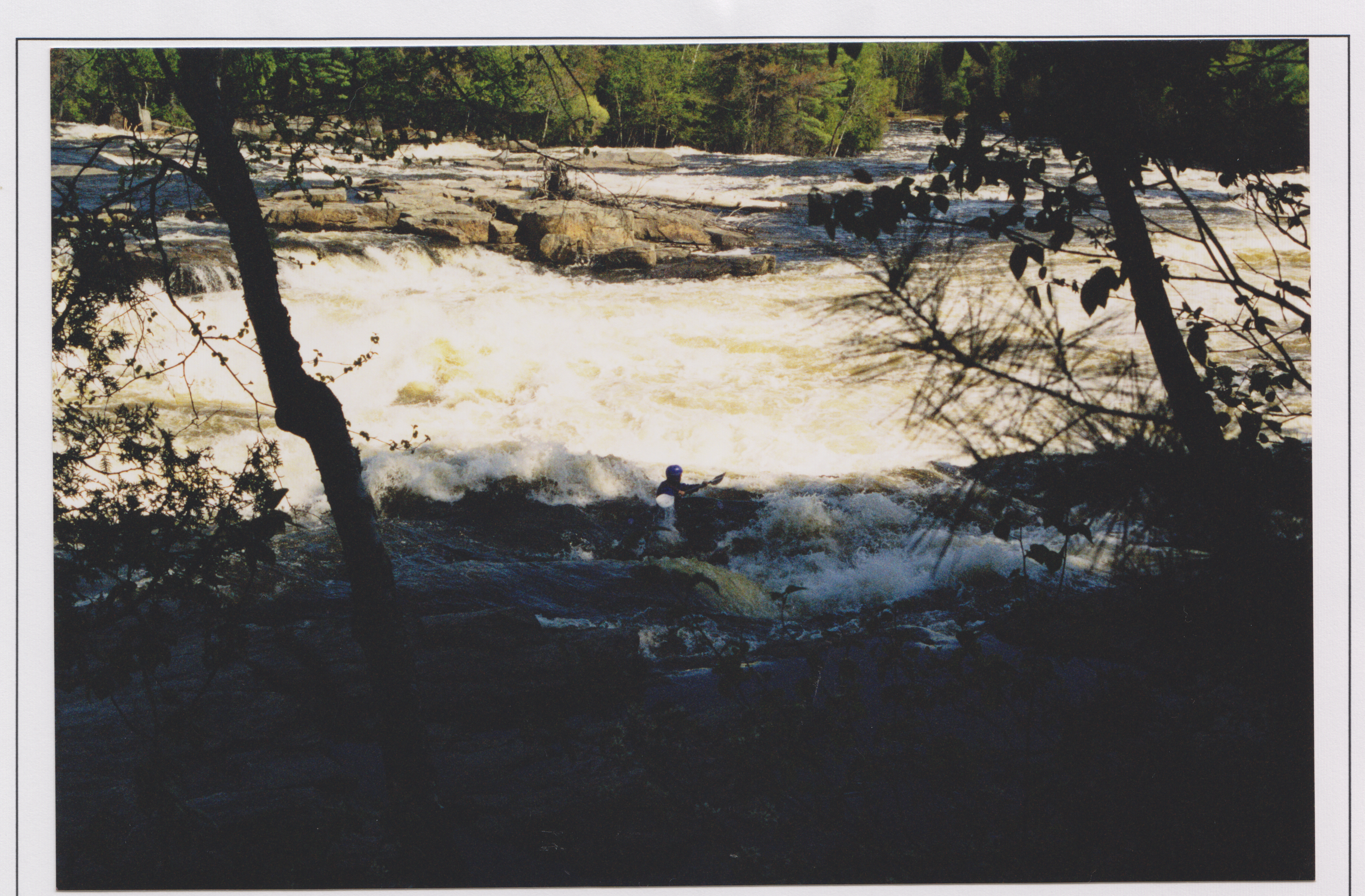
Kayaker, Batiscan River Park, West Bank Trail

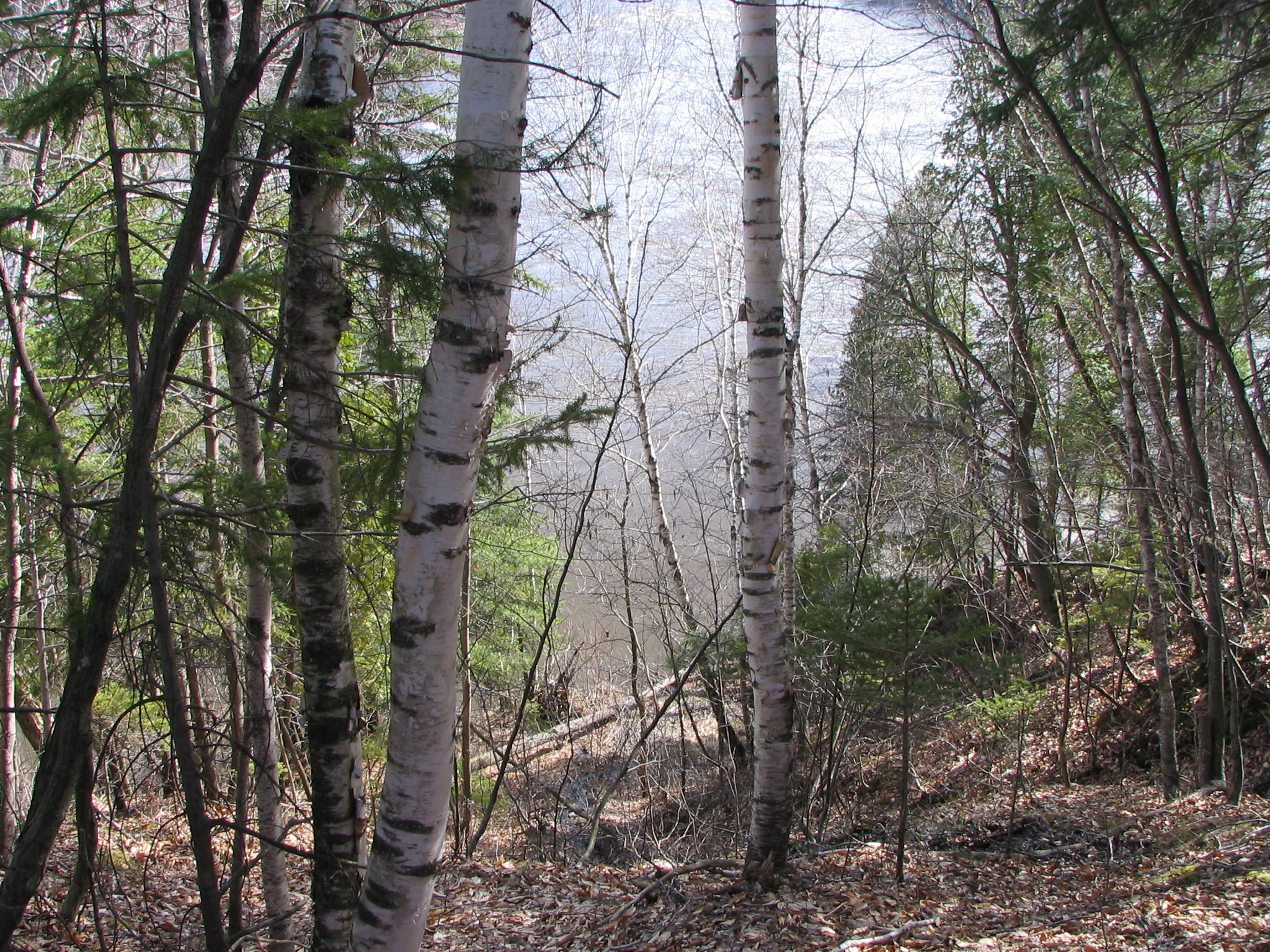
Batiscan River Park, Grand-Basin sector

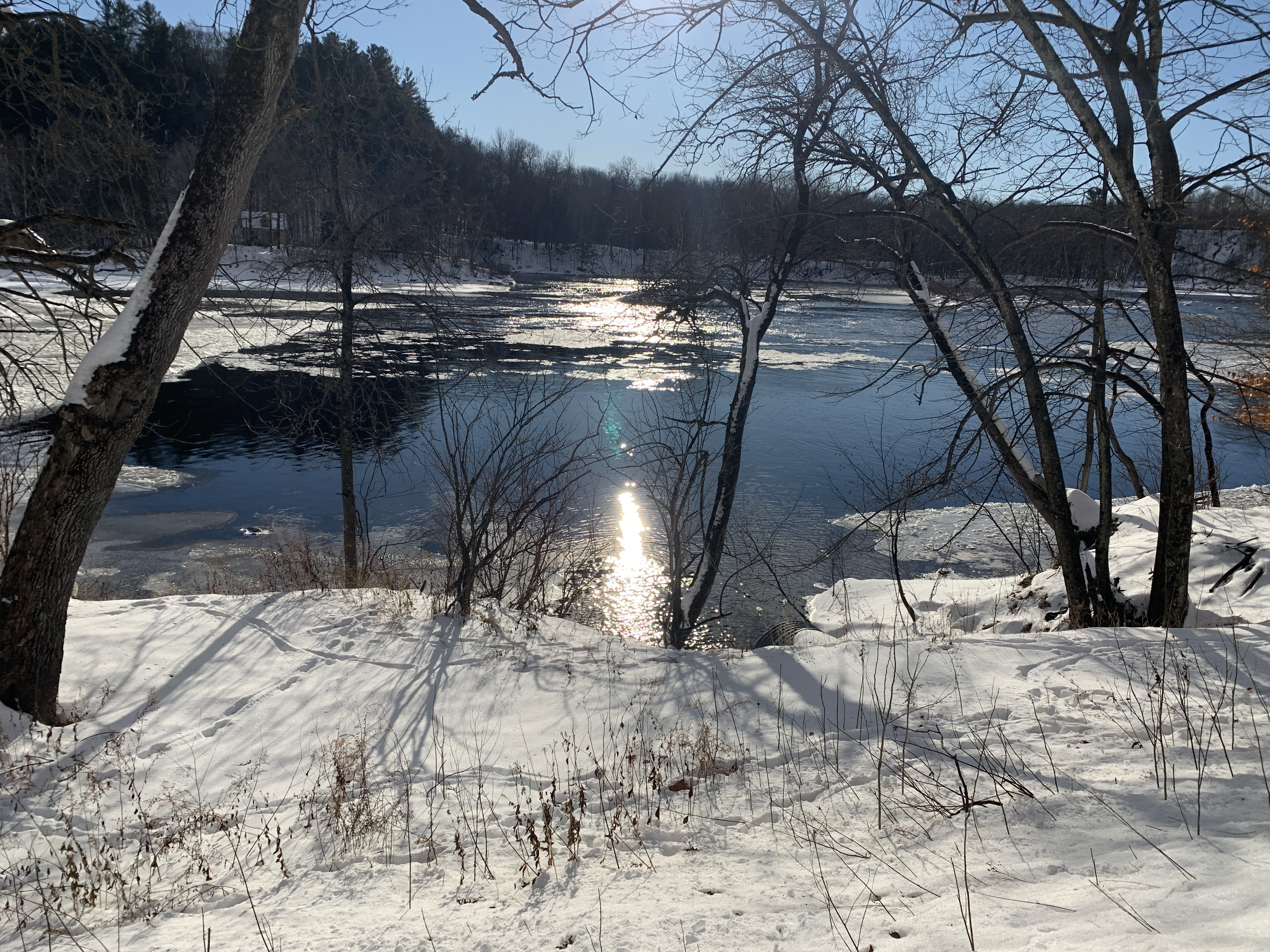
Sainte-Geneviève-de-Batiscan

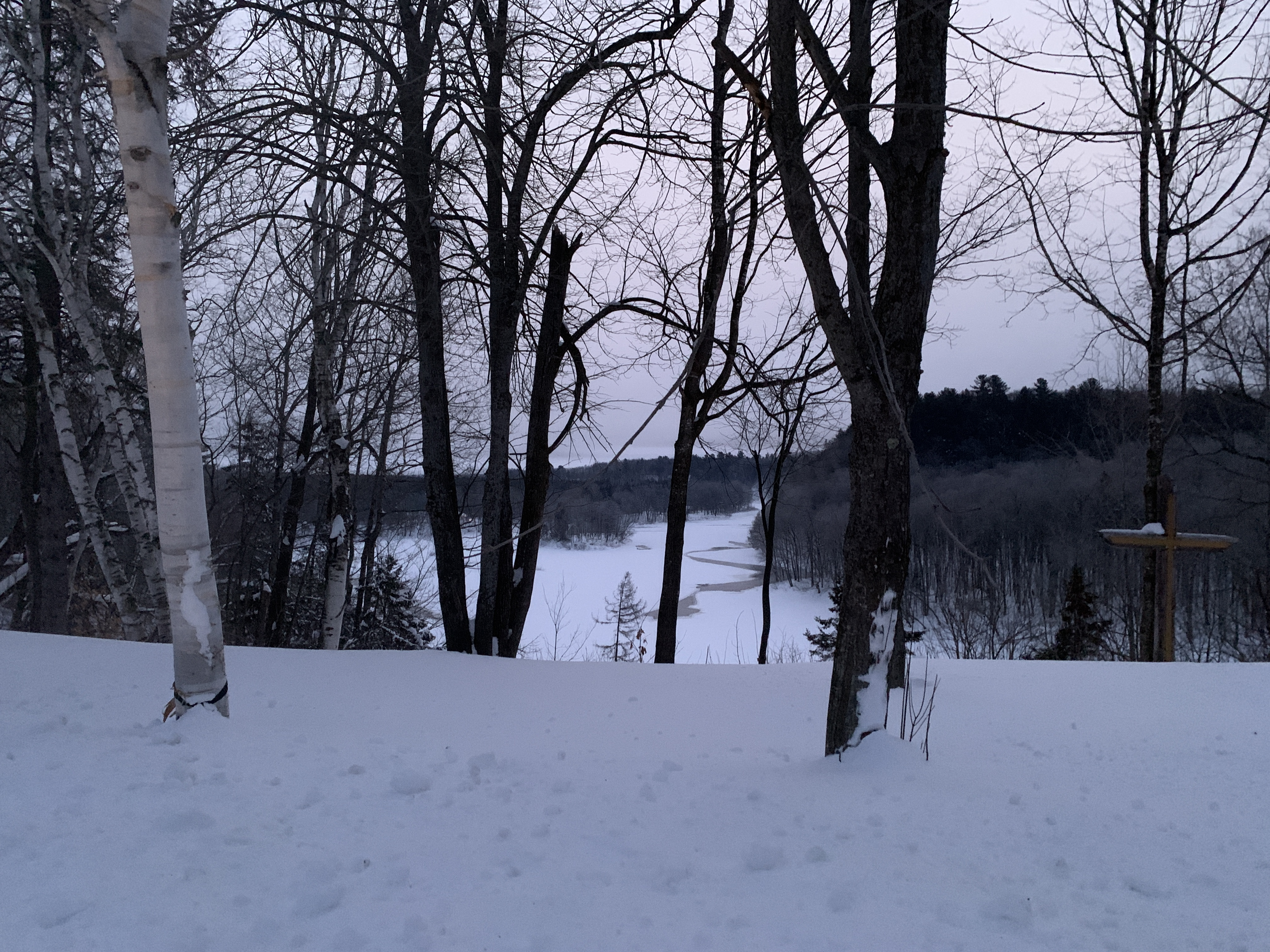
Sainte-Geneviève-de-Batiscan, winter open water net

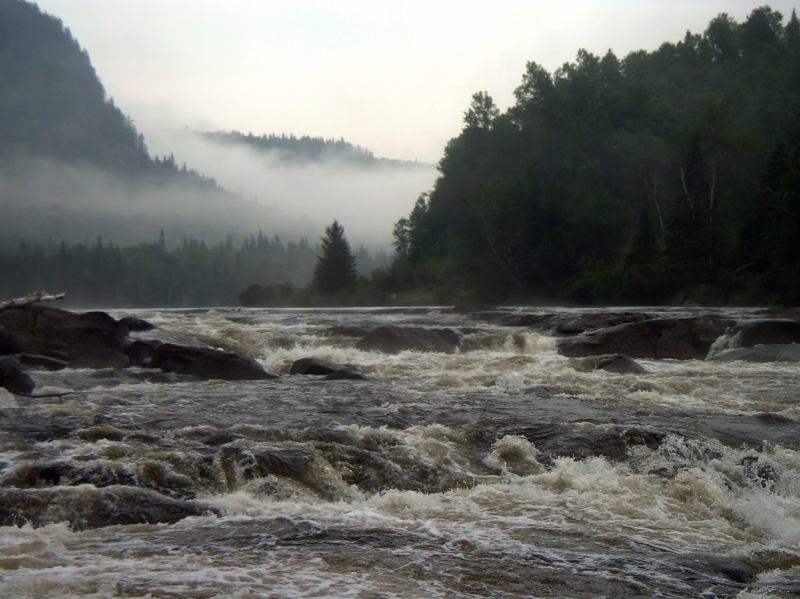
River rapids
- Rural and agricultural zones
Saint-Stanislas - Sainte-Genevieve-de-Batiscan

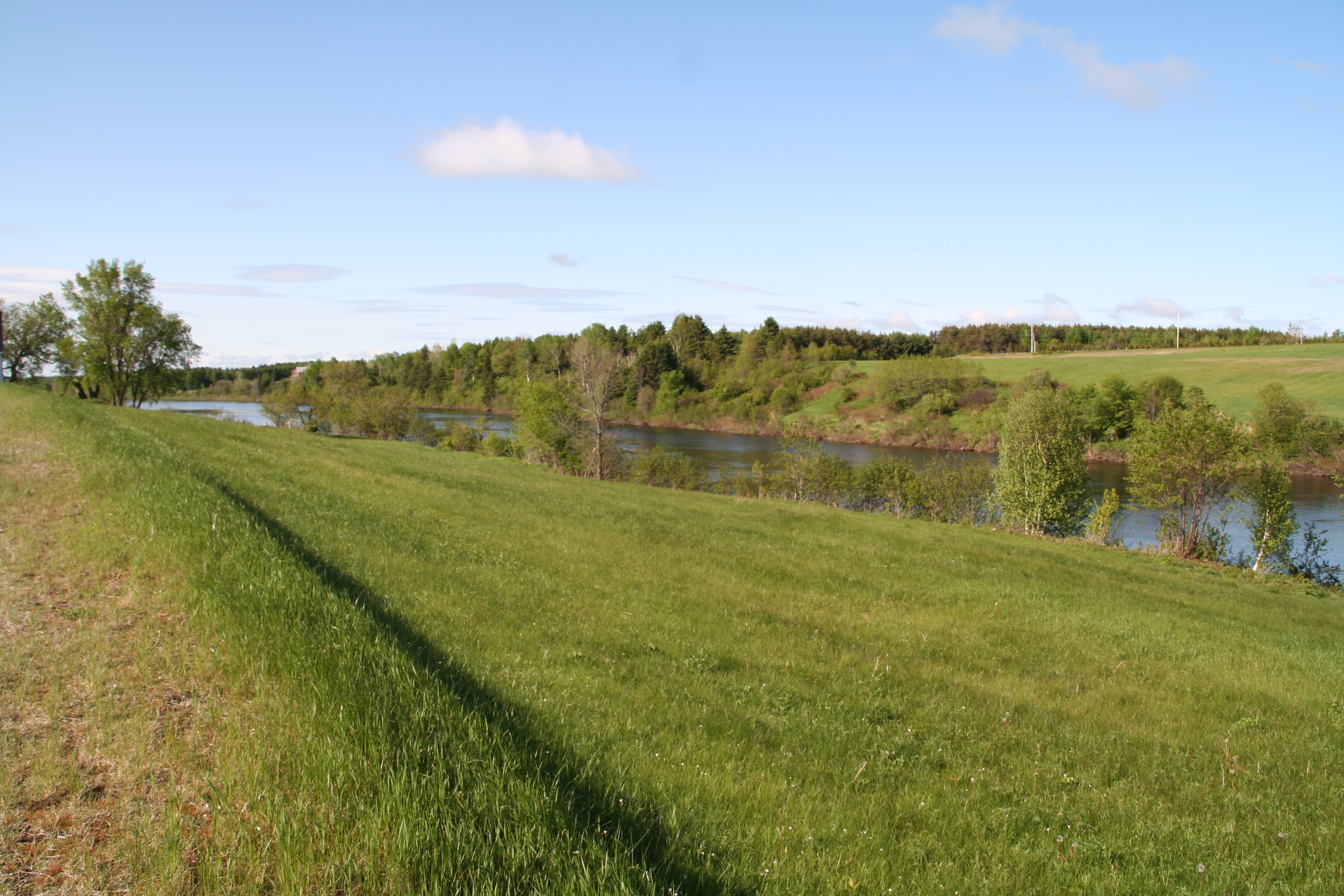
Saint-Stanislas, rang de la Rivière Batiscan NE

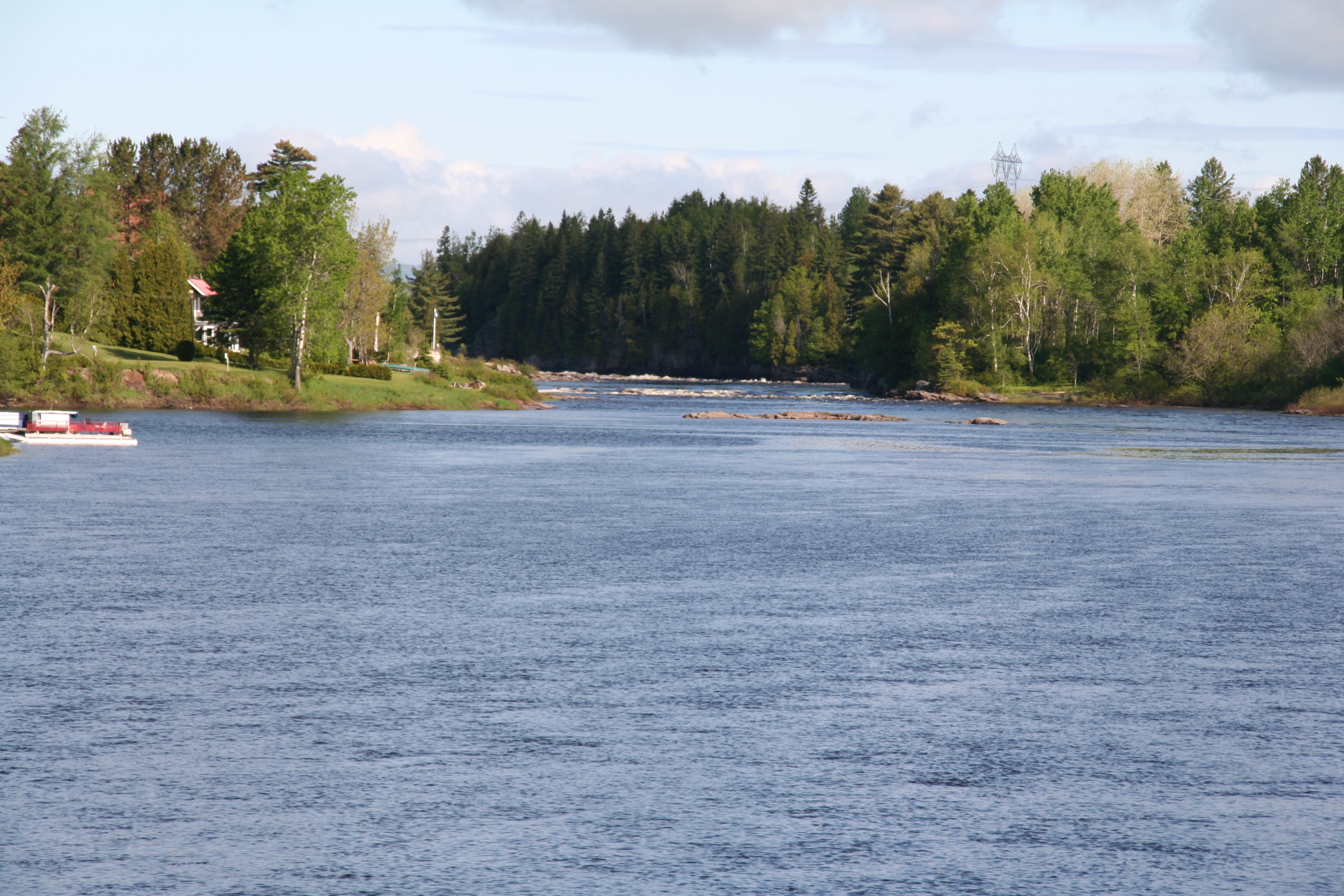
Saint-Stanislas, rang de la Rivière Batiscan NE

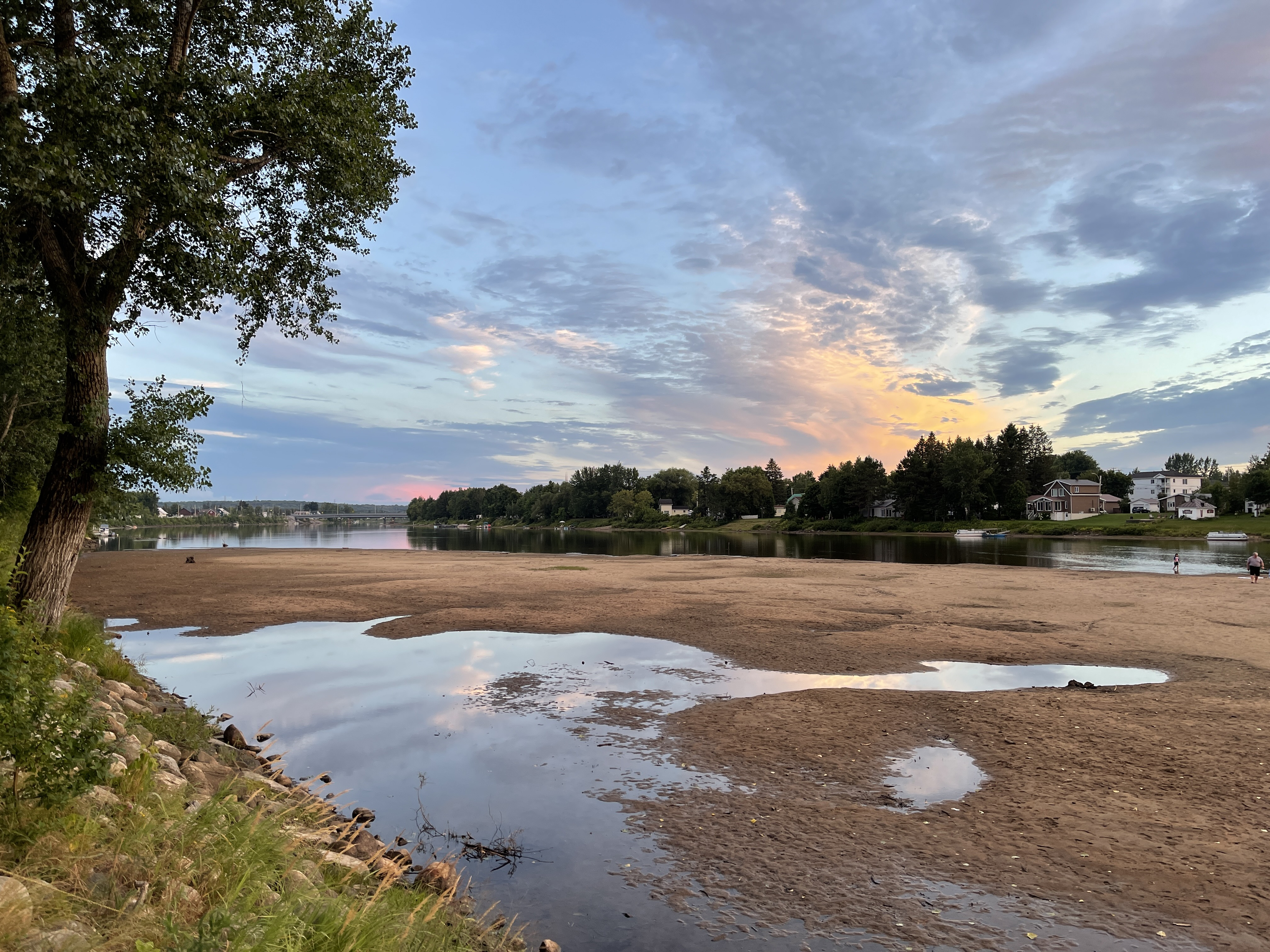
St-Stanislas, rang de la Rivière Batiscan NE

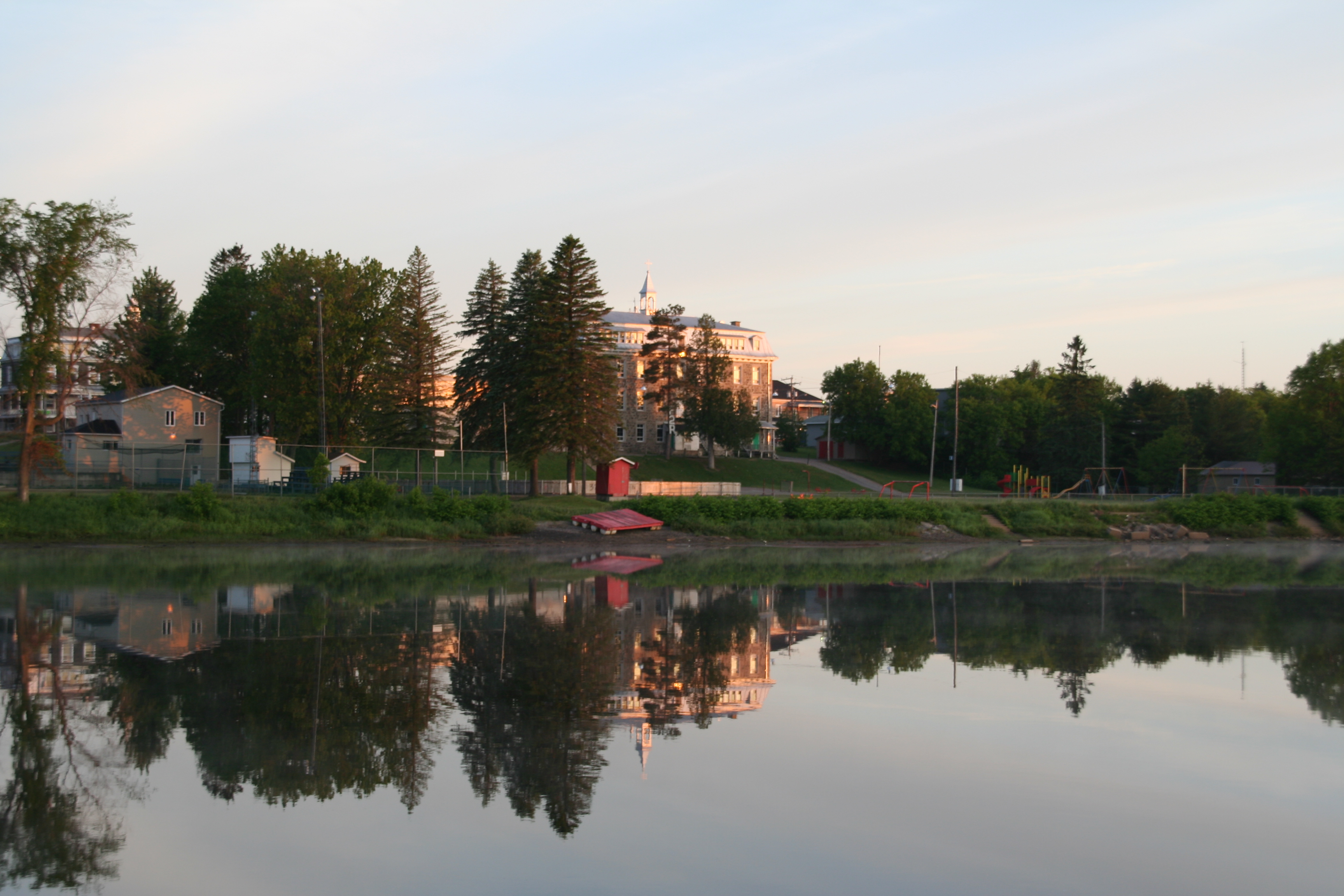
Saint-Stanislas, la rivière, du rang de la Rivière-Batiscan NE

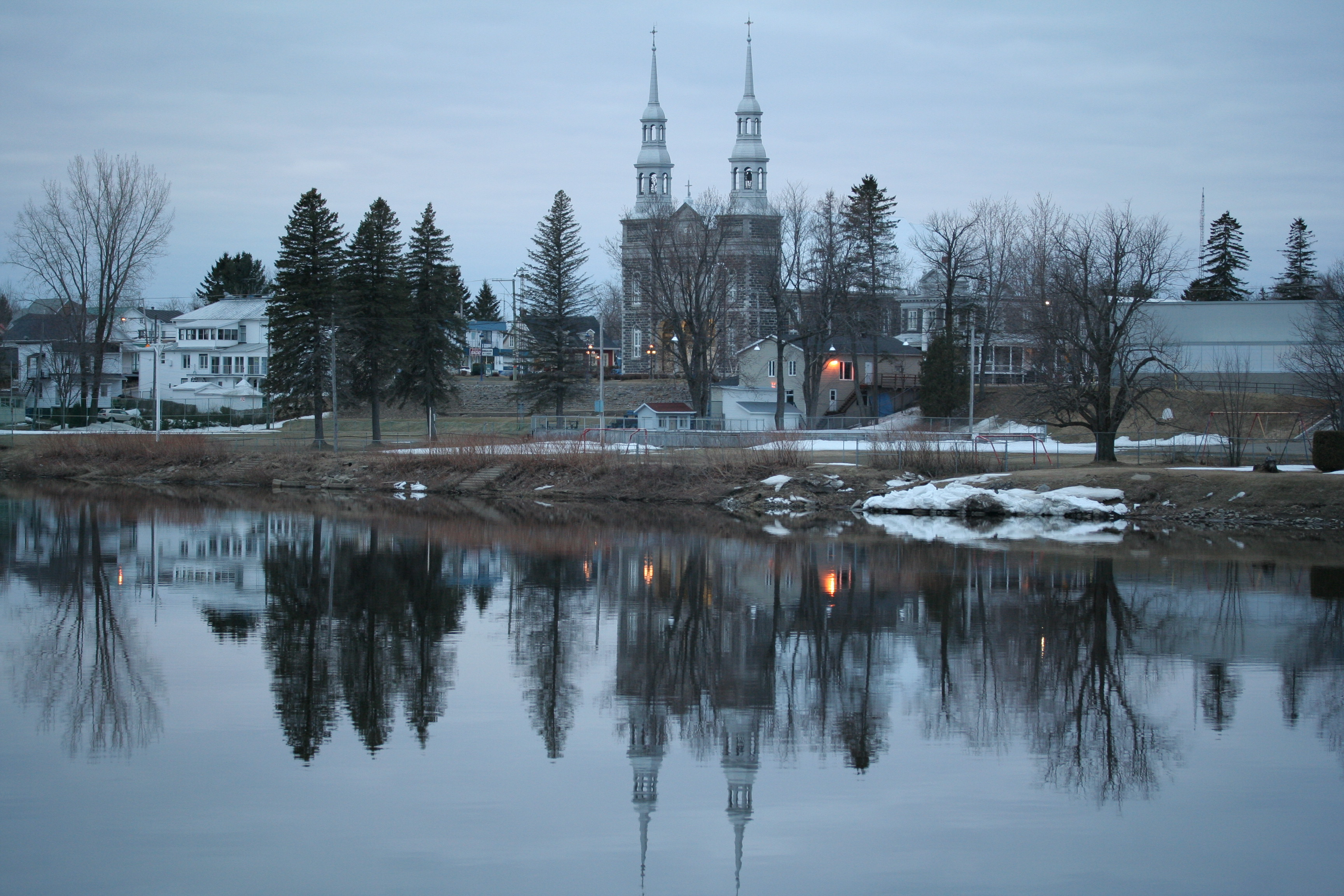
Saint-Stanislas, rang de la Rivière Batiscan NE

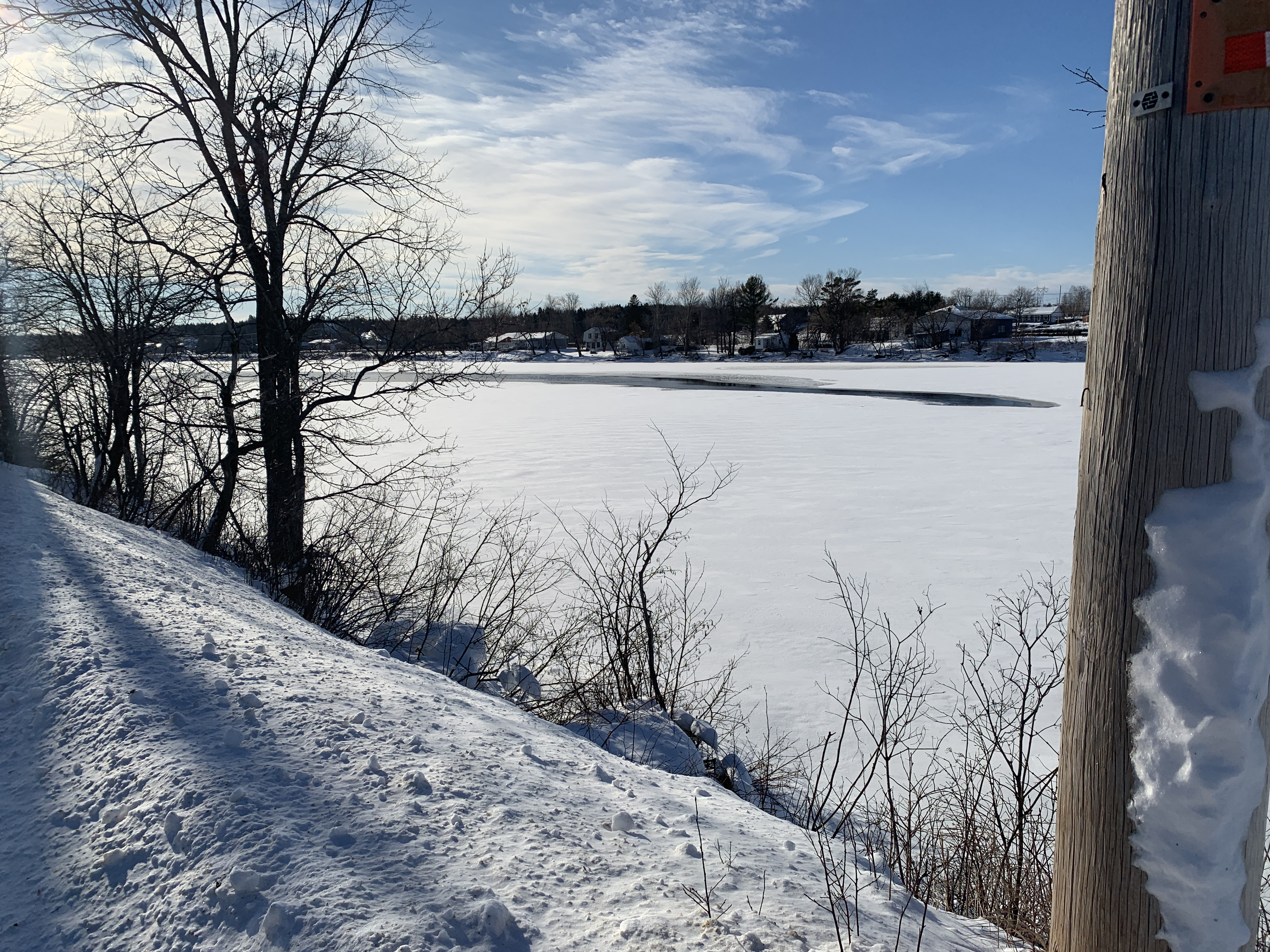
Saint-Stanislas, rang de la Rivière Batiscan NE,

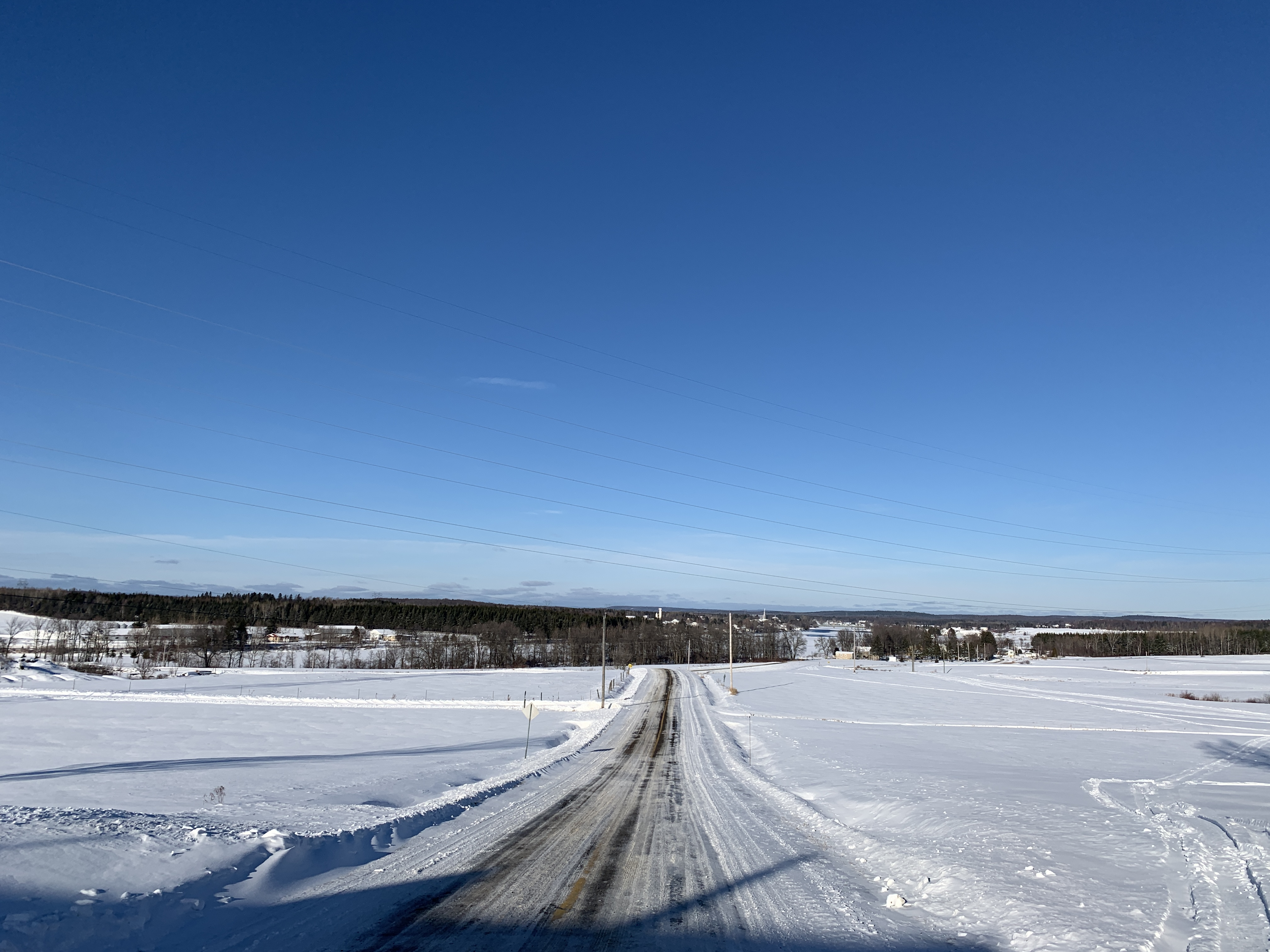
Saint-Stanislas, rang de la Rivière Batiscan NE

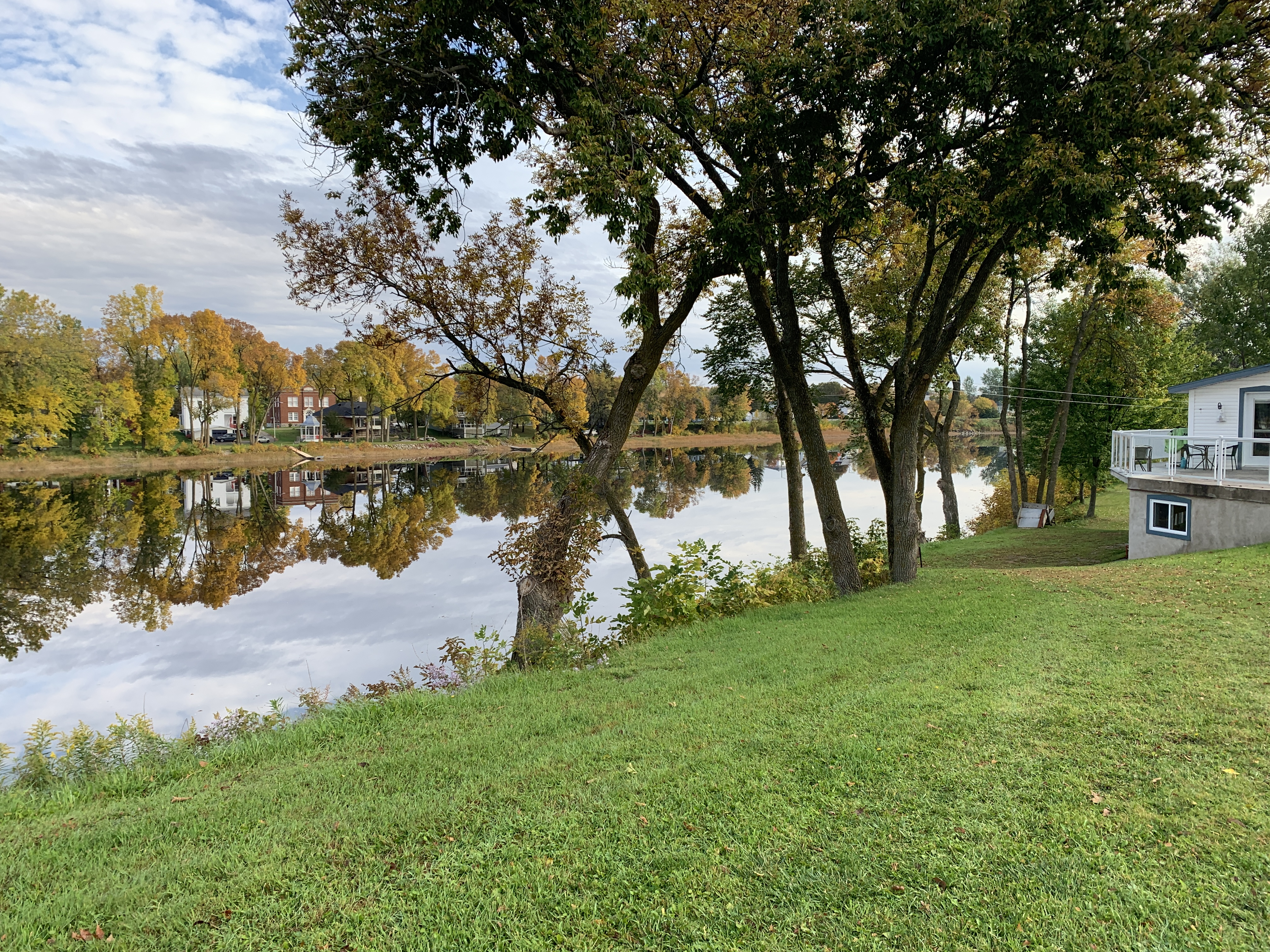
Ste-Geneviève-de-Batiscan, rang Sud

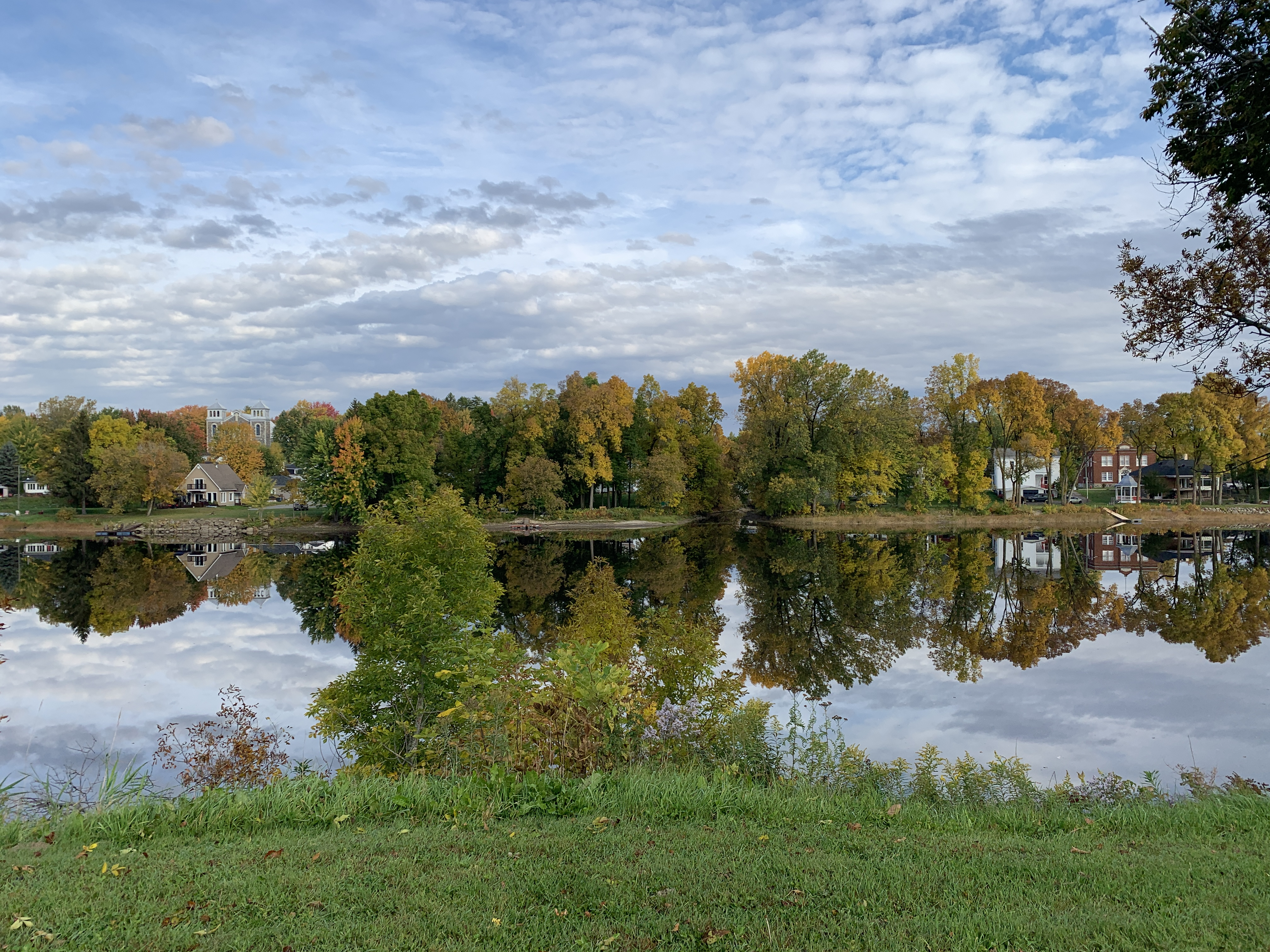
Sainte-Geneviève-de-Batiscan, rang Sud (route 361)

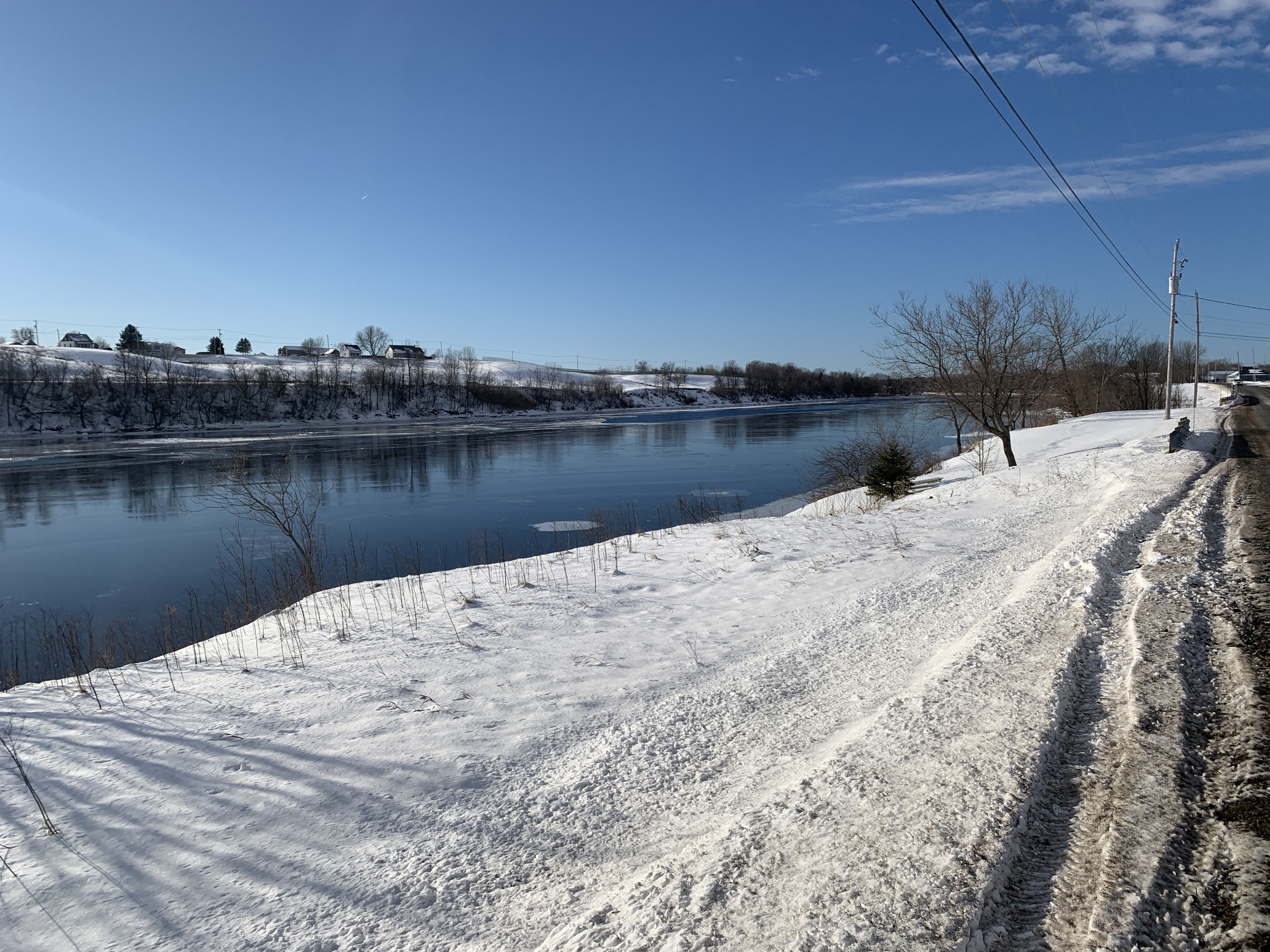
Sainte-Geneviève-de-Batiscan, rang Nord

== History ==
There is a known archaeological potential at Sainte-Geneviève-de-Batiscan where a manuscript source (Massicotte, 1935) mentions the discovery of artifacts from the prehistoric period (projectile point and others). Thus, the edge of the St. Lawrence River and its main tributaries have been occupied for several millennia. Because of its importance as a possible route of circulation and penetration to the interior, the Batiscan River remains a significant point of interest for prehistoric archaeology. Source: Chemin de la rivière à Veillette, archaeological reconnaissance.

On the river's riparian strips

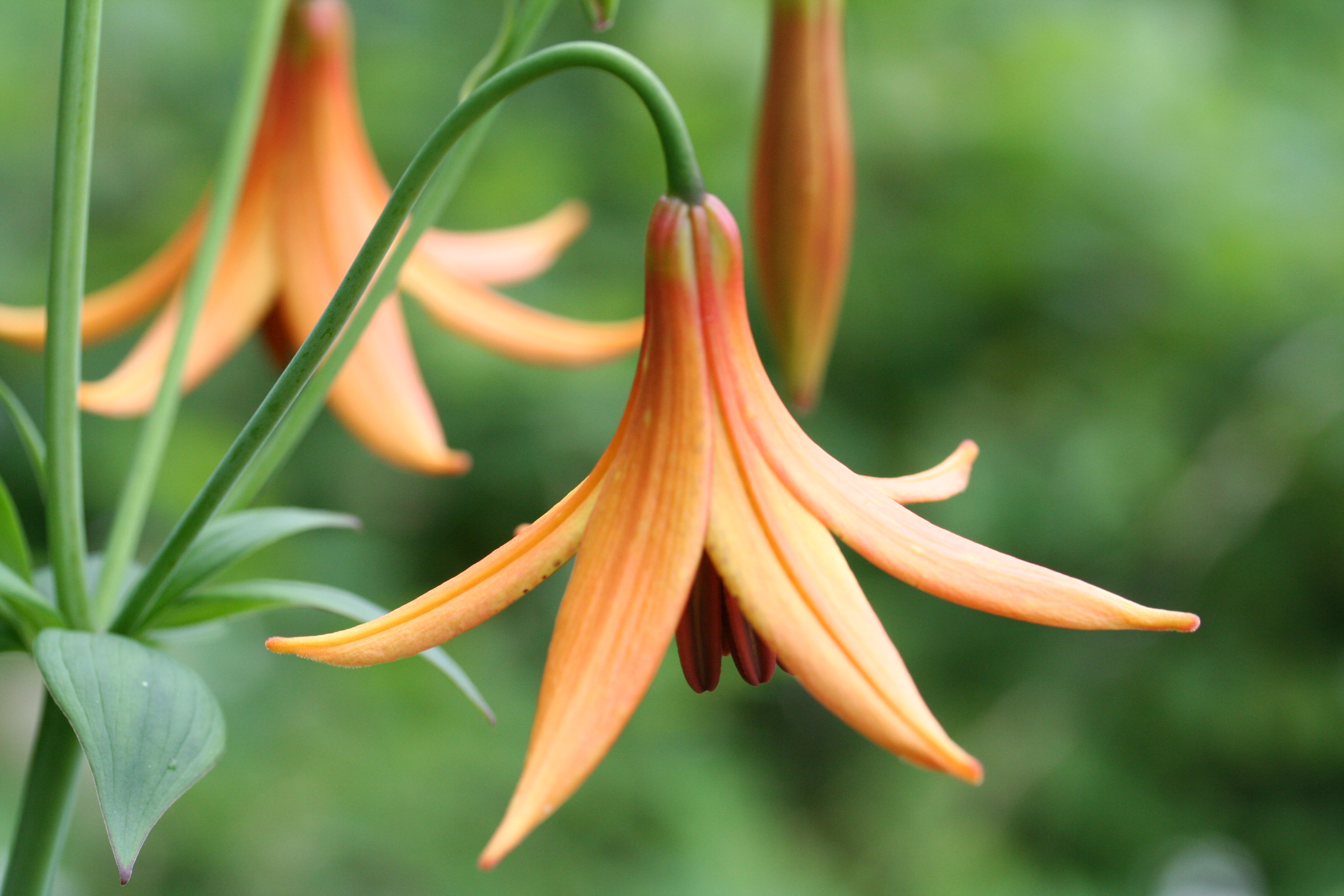
Lilium canadense L. — Wild yellow lily

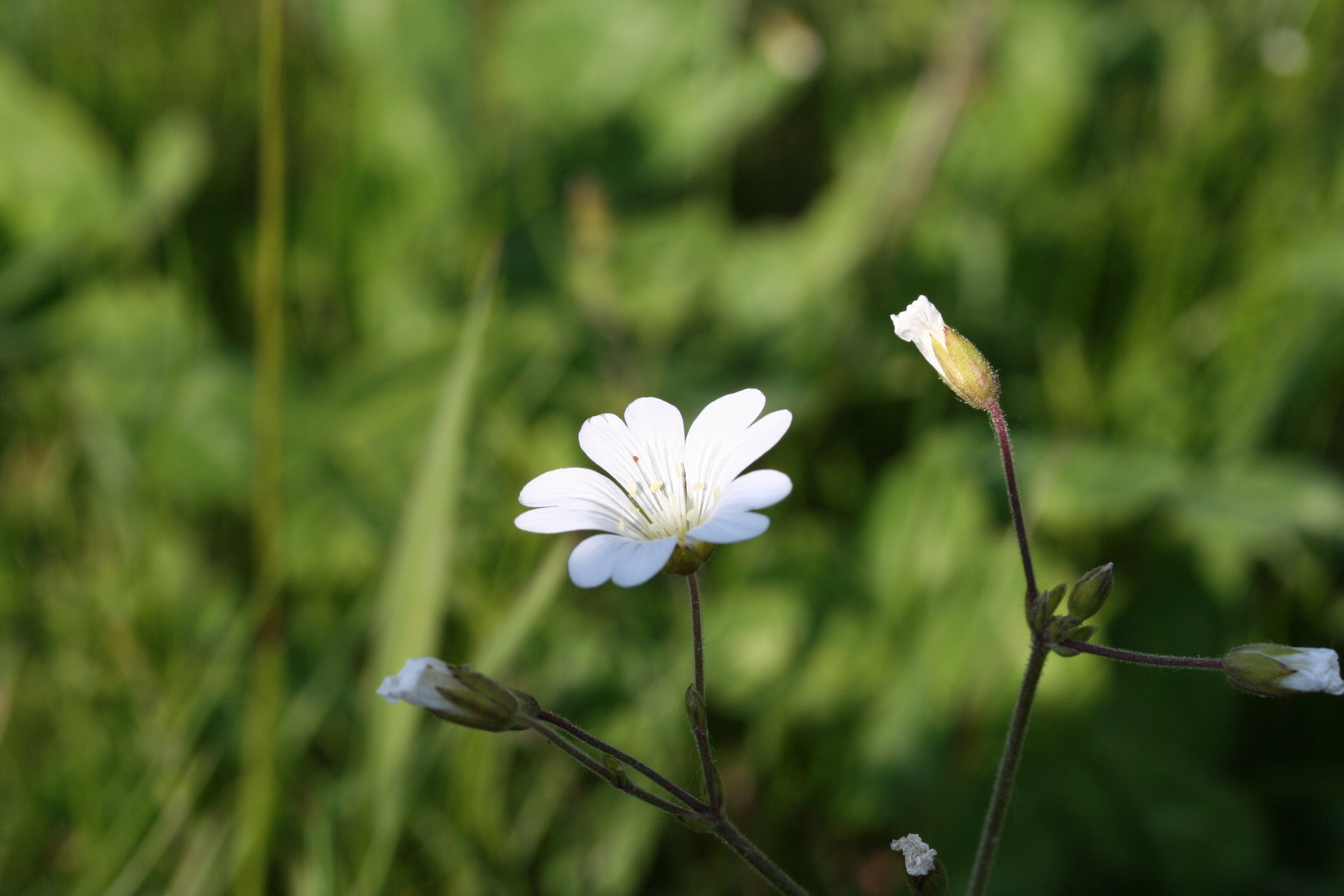
Cerastium arvense L. — Meadow chickweed

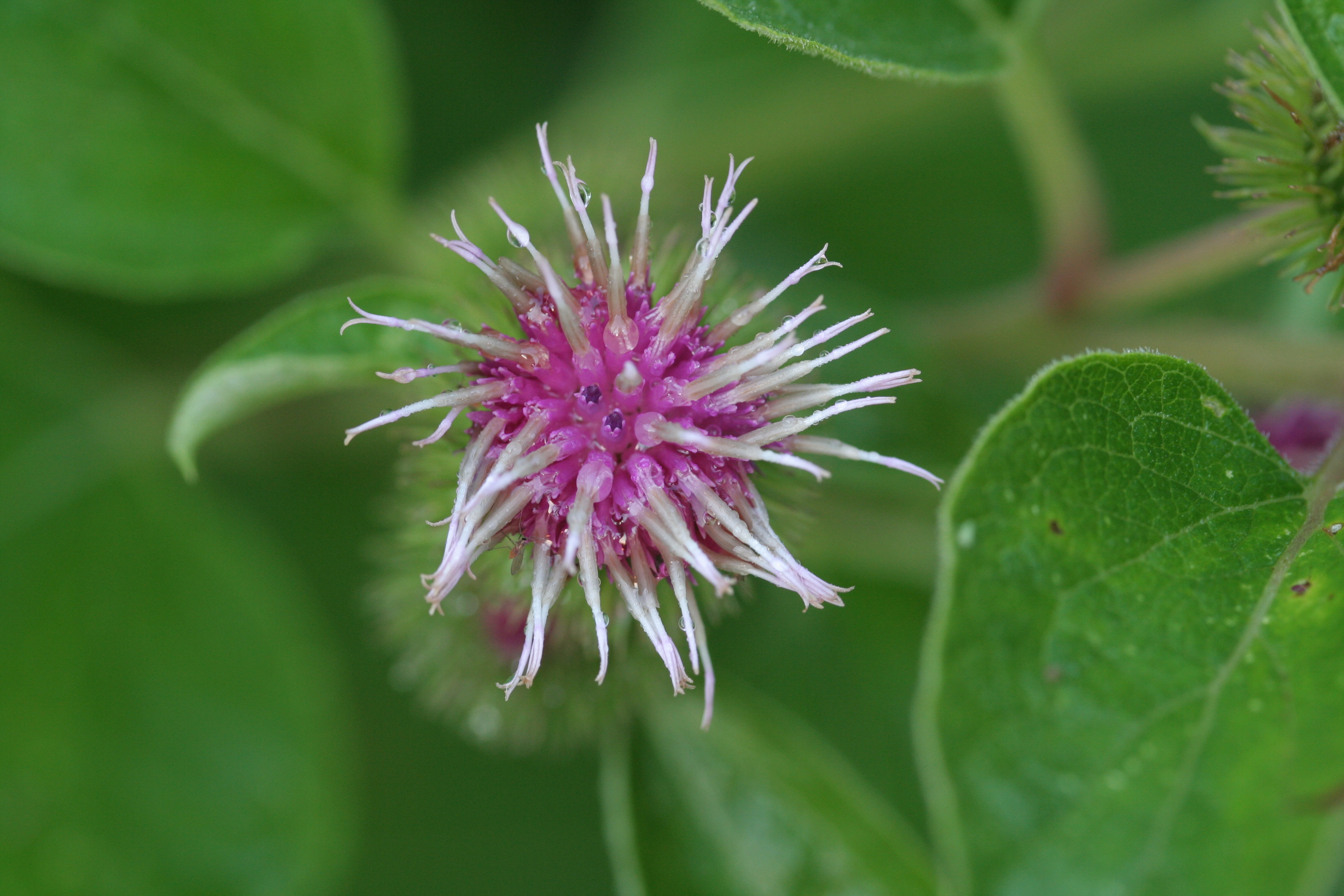
Arctium minus (Hill) Bernhardi — Common burdock

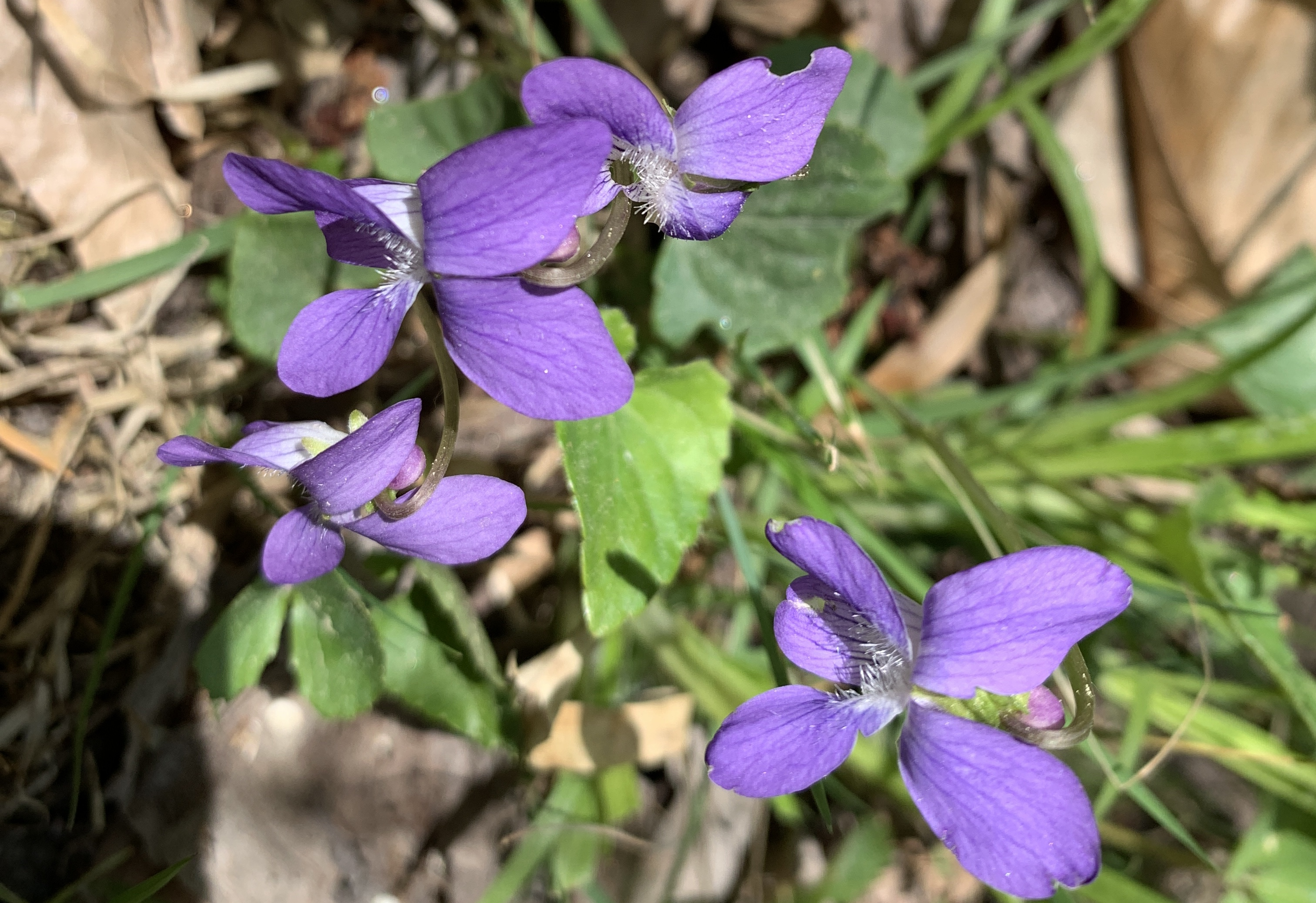
Viola L. — Violet

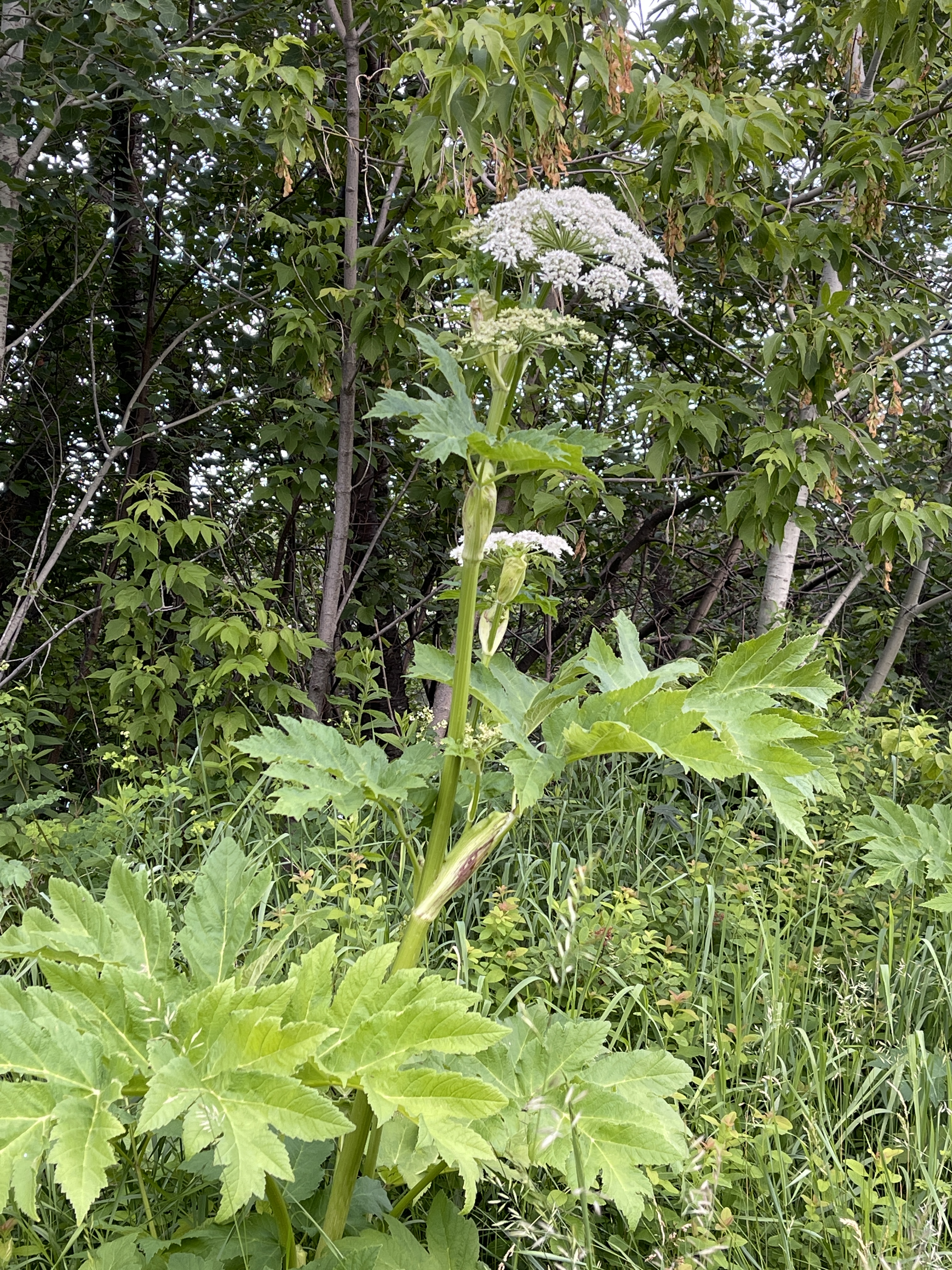
Heracleum maximum Bart. — Cow parsnip

In 1639, the Jesuits made the acquisition of lordship of Batiscan in order to evangelize the Attikameks. They do not settled in the colony, although they used the river up to the nineteenth century for the fur trade. In 1685, the Jesuits conceded the first batches of the Lordship, to the settlers established mainly in Sainte-Geneviève-de-Batiscan. In 1781, they installed a flour mill on Rivière des Envies, tributaries deemed easier than Batiscan River. In 1786, a chapel was built in Saint-Stanislas (Des Chenaux). Toward the end of nineteenth century, the municipalities were founded: Saint-Séverin, Saint-Tite, Sainte-Thècle, Saint-Adelphe and Lac-aux-Sables.

== Photos ==
- Mouth in Batiscan
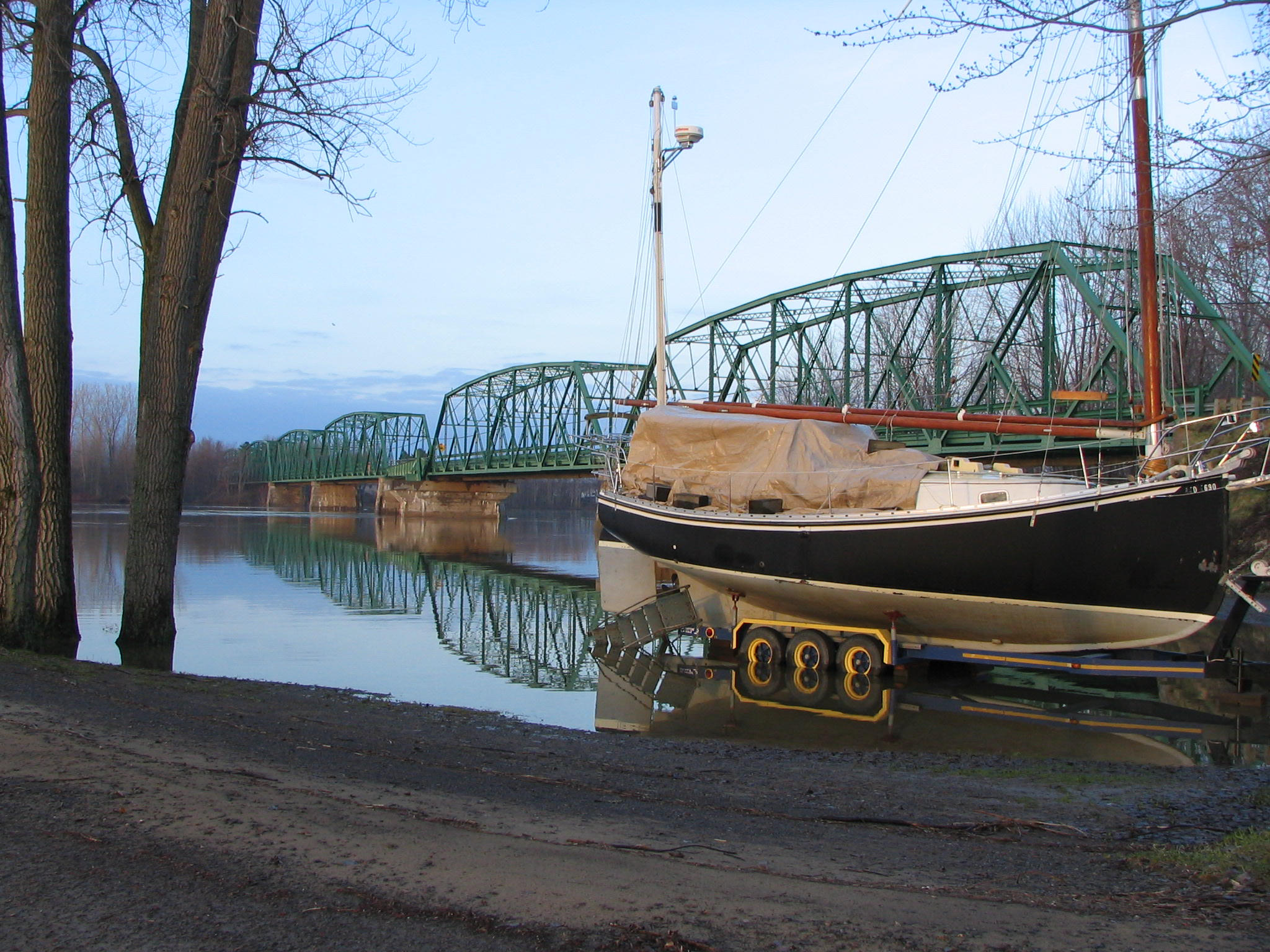
Old iron bridge, Chemin du Roy (Route 138)

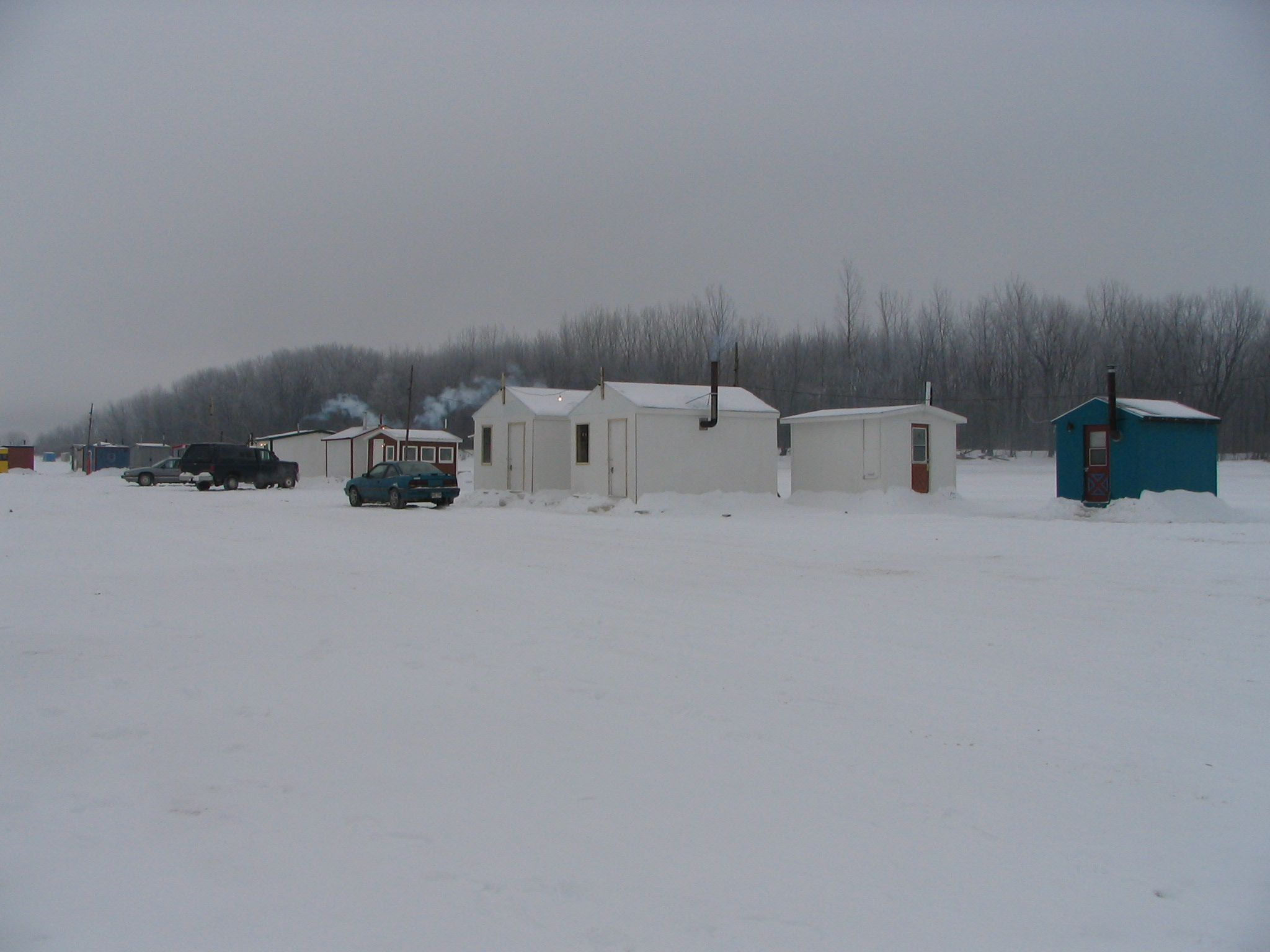
Ice fishing huts

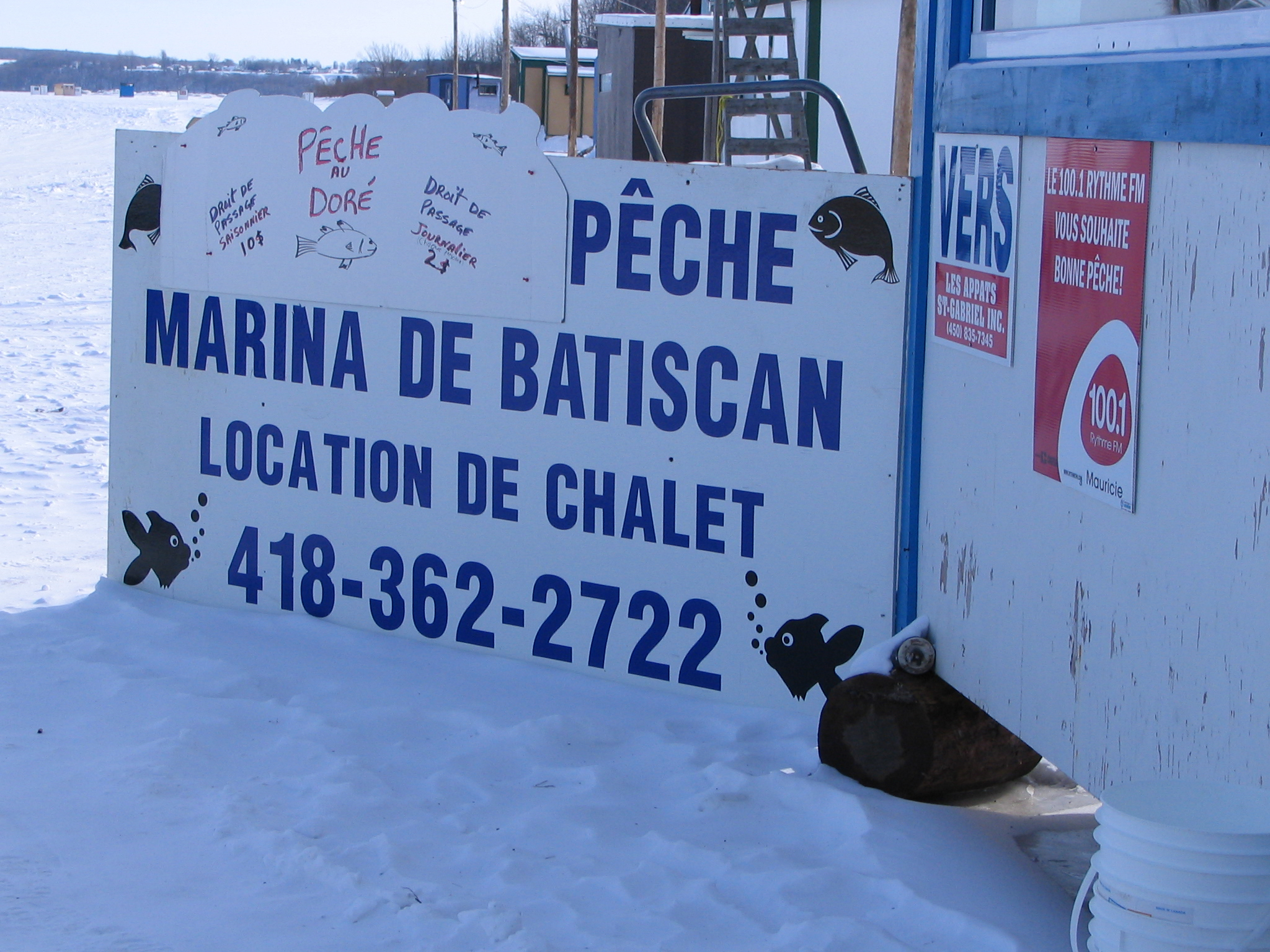
Sign on the river ice path, access from the Marina

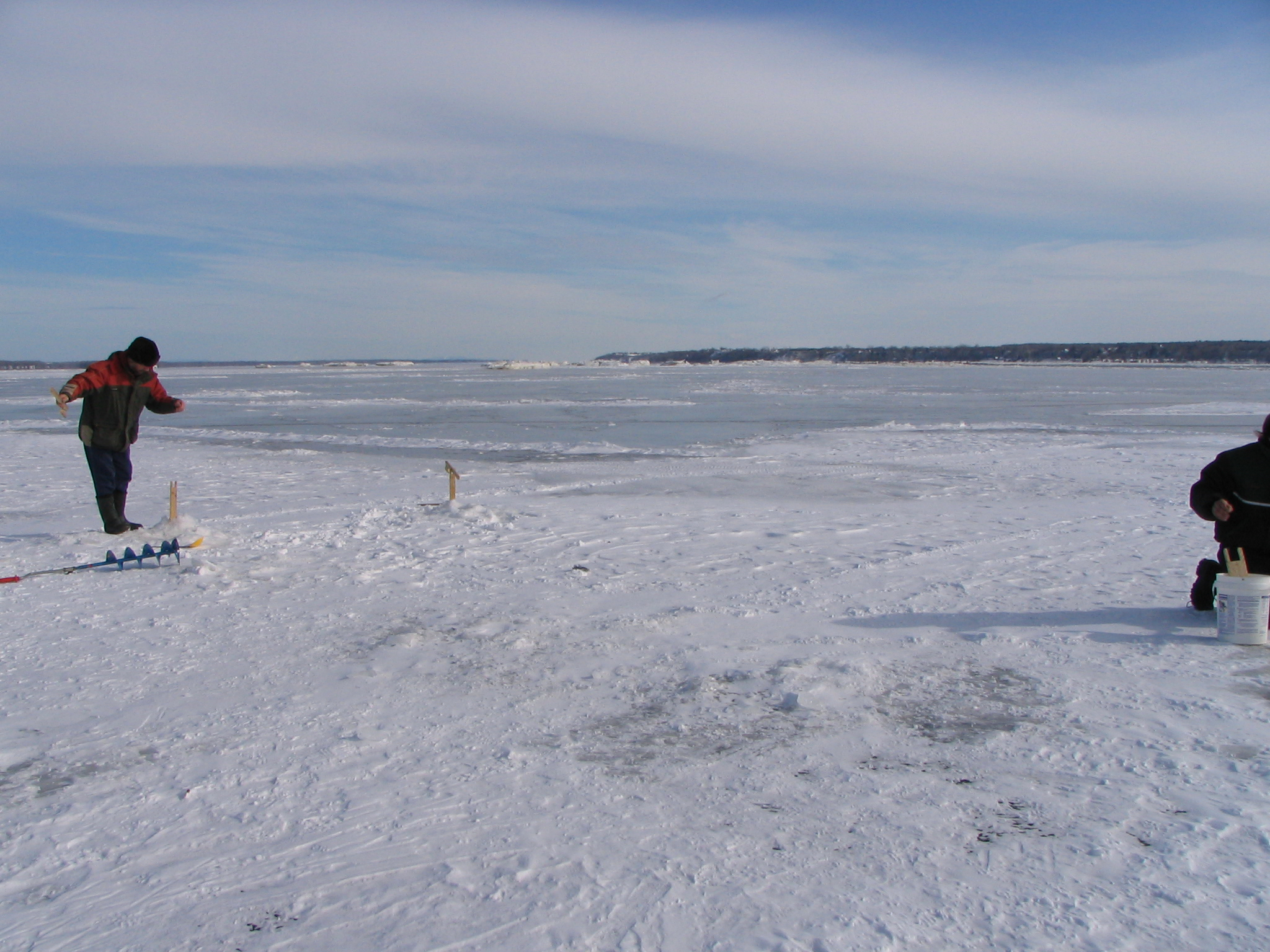
Fishermen, brimbals, on the river ice

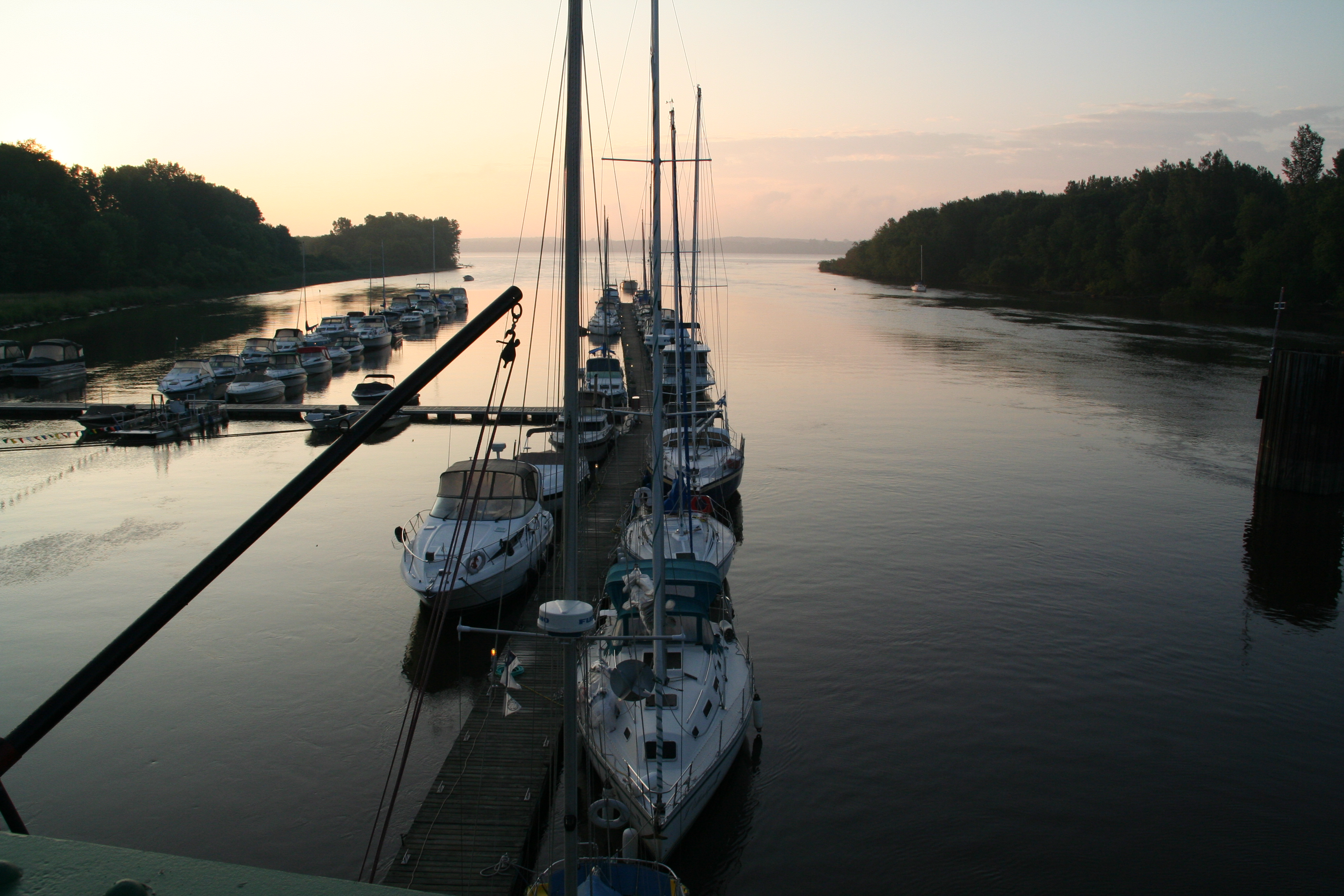
Boats at the docks of the marina, from the bridge on the Chemin du Roy

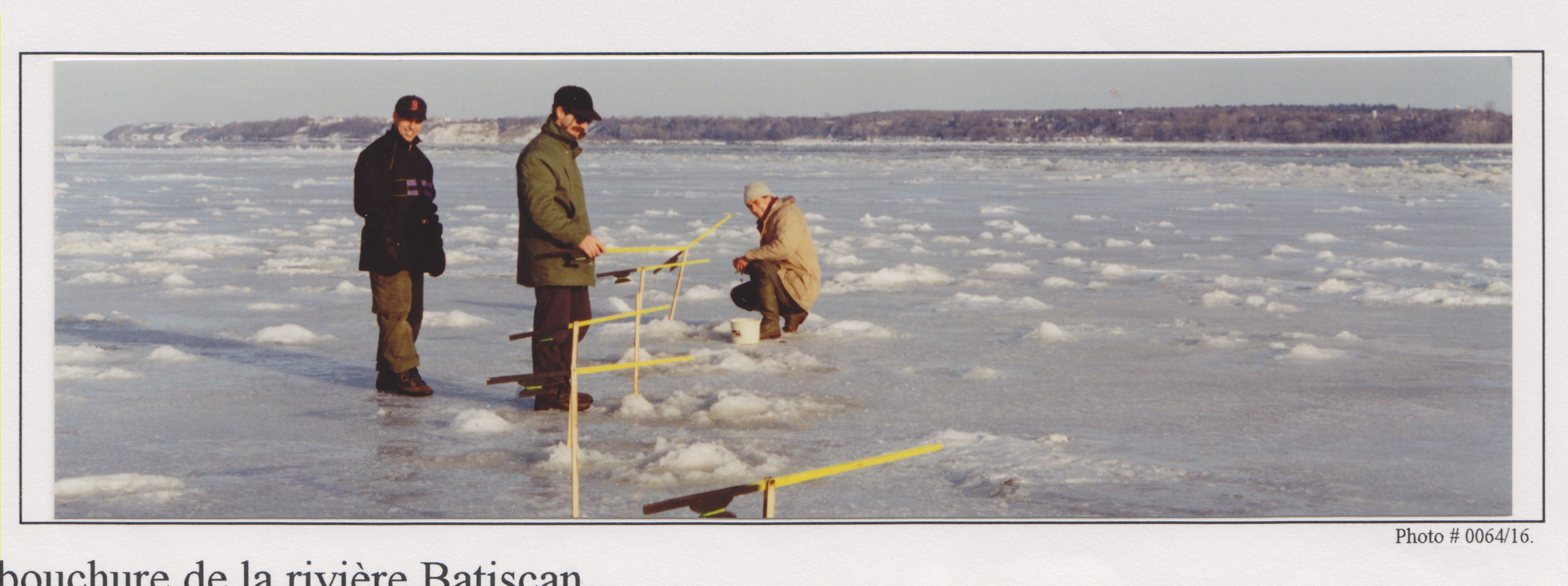
Fishermen offshore, on the ice of the estuarian section of the St. Lawrence River and the mouth of the Batiscan River
- Structures
Bridges, footbridge, built

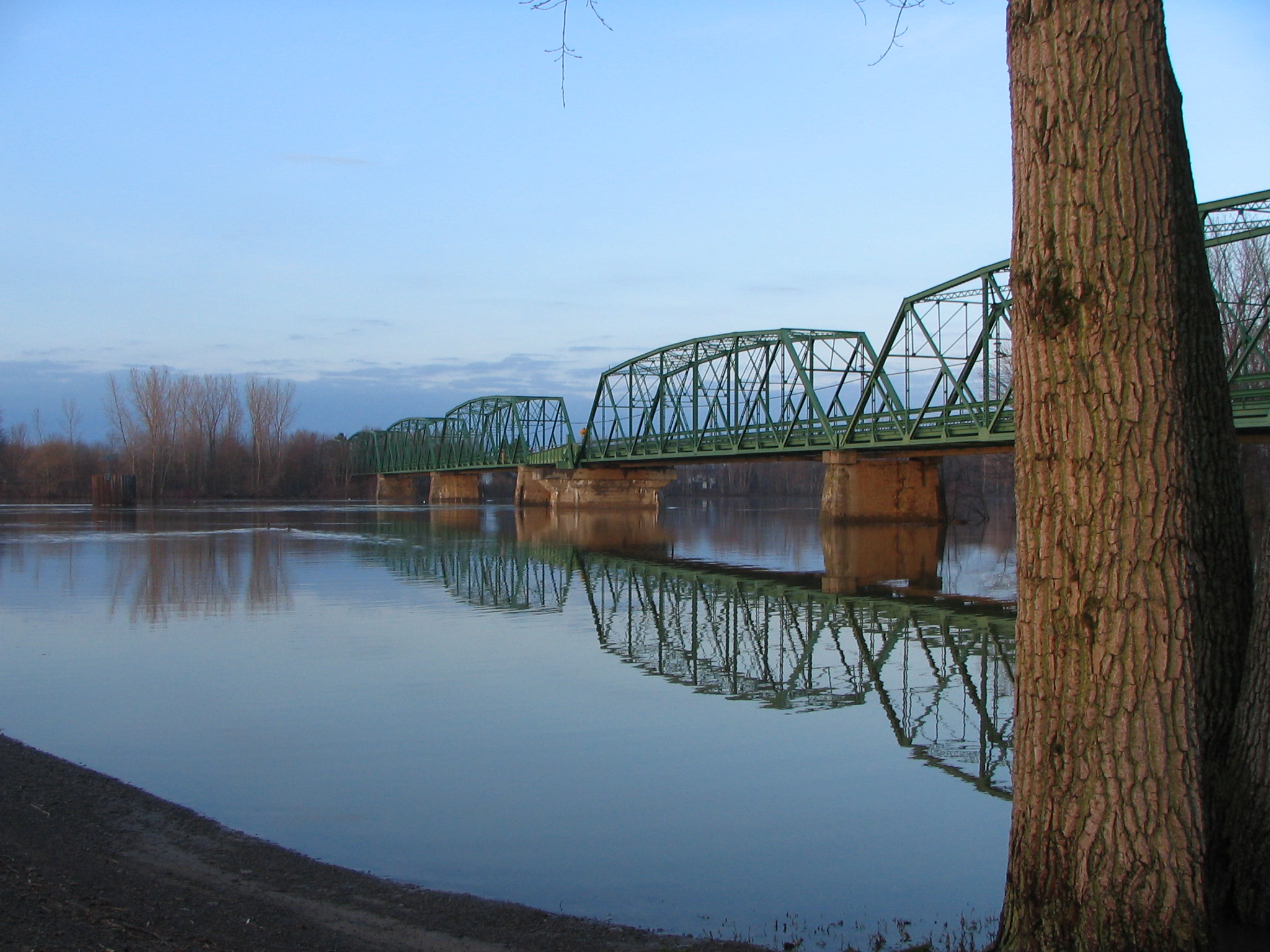
Batiscan, Chemin du Roy (Quebec Route 138)

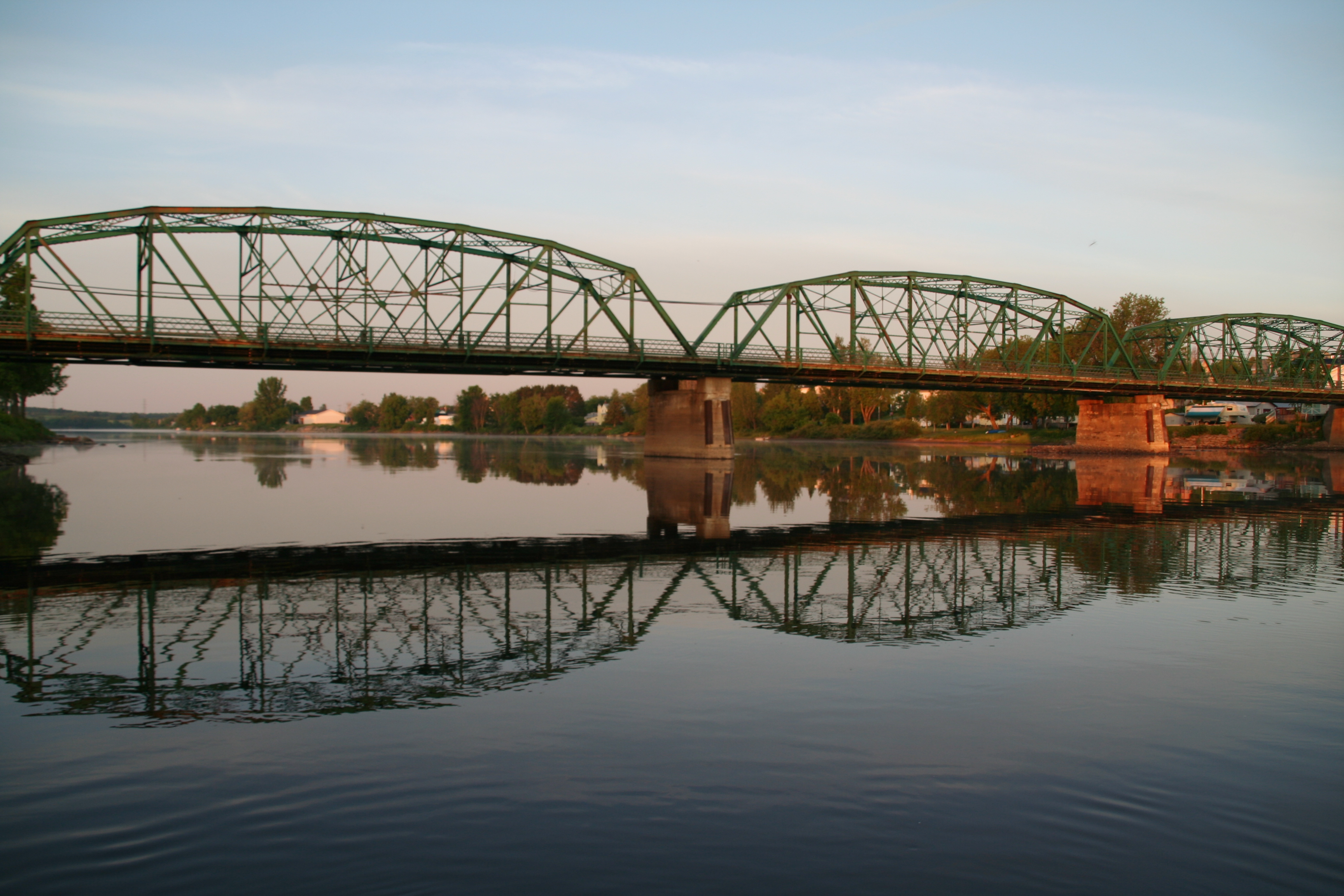
Saint-Stanislas, bridge over the Batiscan River, (Quebec Route 159)

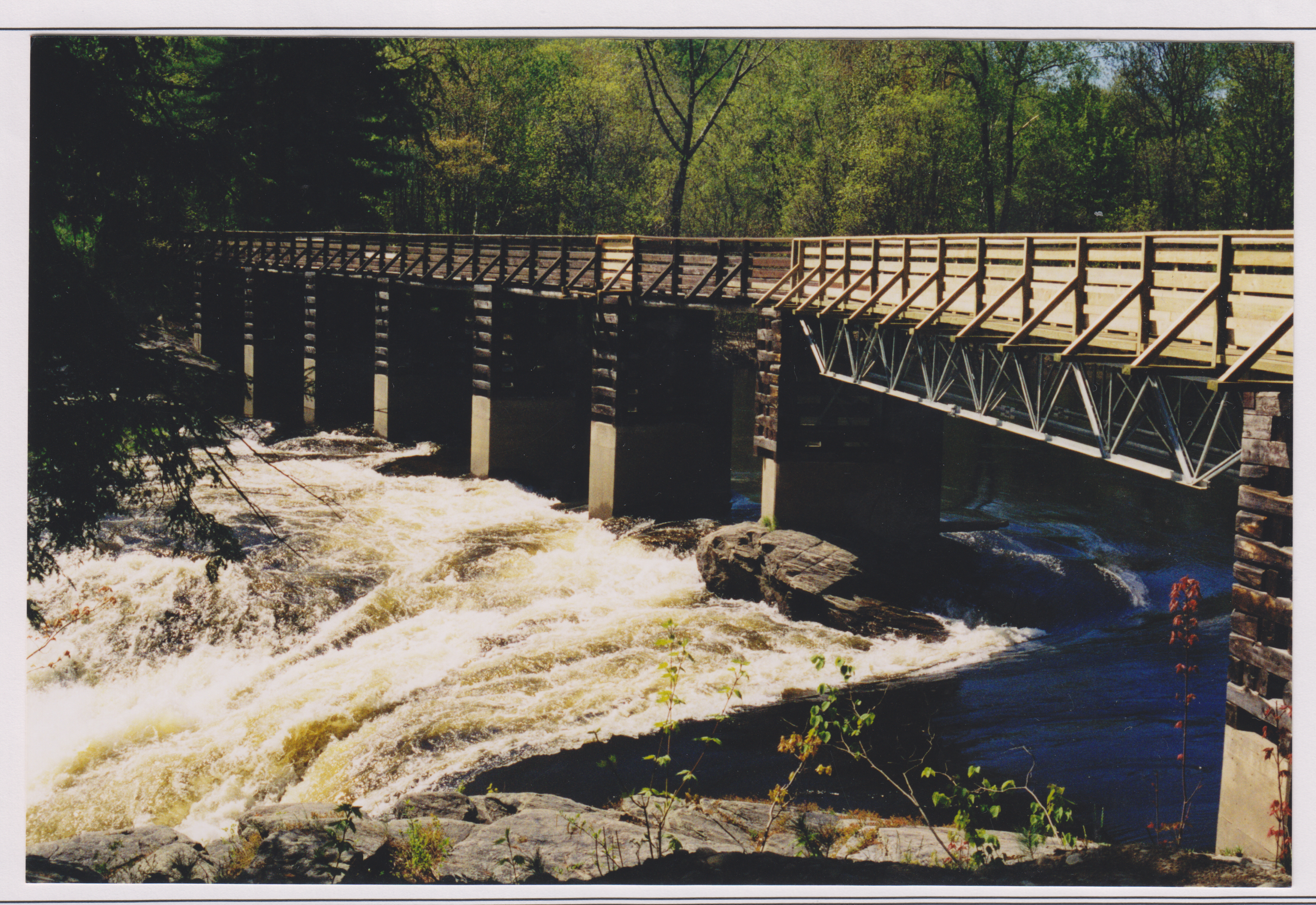
Batiscan River Park, footbridge, spring flow

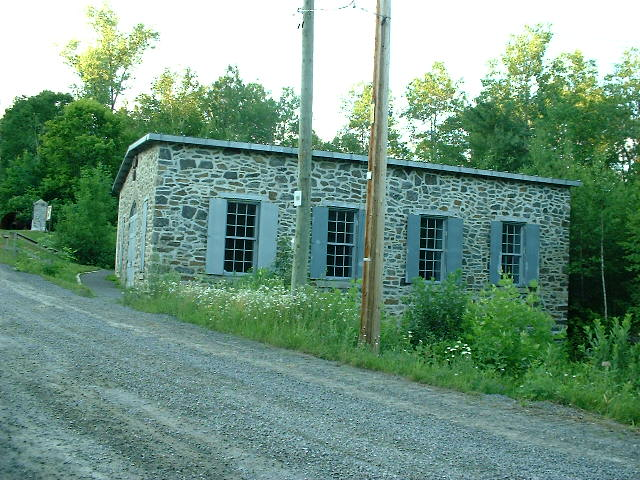
Former annex of the Saint-Narcisse power plant

=== Main waterfalls ===
The main waterfalls (or rapids) of the Batiscan River are (starting from the head of the river):

Upper Batiscanie:

Note: Upper Batiscanie begins at the mouth of the Rivière-à-Pierre that empties into the Batiscan River, at kilometre 88.5.

1. A series of Class II rapids over 50 kilometres (31 mi) from Lac-aux-Perles down to the Island of the Cross ("Ile de La Croix"). This section of the river is only accessible by train, or for those who wish to canoe-camp;
2. continuing rapids of class III and IV (ideal for rafting) in the section "Portes de l'enfer" (Gates of Hell) on 25 km upstream of Rivière-à-Pierre, between Island of the Cross (Île-de-la-Croix) and the beginning of the Portneuf Wildlife Reserve;
3. Series of rapids in the Portneuf Wildlife Reserve, several tens of kilometres: Trois-Roches (Three Rocks) Rapids, rapids "de la Sauvagesse" (Savage Rapid), Rapids "à Thiffault";
4. Series of rapids between the Talbot bridge and Mount Otis (north of the village of Notre-Dame-de-Montauban), particularly at km 98.5, km 88 and km 84;

Mid Batiscanie

Note: Mid Batiscanie lies between Murphy Falls (Saint-Stanislas) and the mouth of the Rivière-à-Pierre at km 88.5.

1. Fall of the Ten;
2. Fall of the Nine, located upstream of the bridge in the village of Notre-Dame-des-Anges;
3. Fall of the Eight, located approximately 5.7 km (3.5 mi) by water, below the village of Notre-Dame-de-Montauban and 5.3 km (3.3 mi) upstream from the bridge of the row Price in Saint-Adelphe, located near the village of Lac-aux-Sables. The road to the "Fall of the Eight" start at the intersection of Route 367 (or 2.5 km (1.6 mi) south of the bridge in the village of Notre-Dame-de-Montauban) and goes along the river on the right bank for about 5.2 km (3.2 mi);
4. Fall in the Seven, located downstream of row Price bridge (Lac-aux-Sables) and the mouth of the Tawachiche River);
5. Fall of the Six, located at 1.2 km (0.75 mi) downstream from the mouth of Tawachiche River in forested areas;
6. Fall of the Five, located 2 km (1.2 mi) downstream from the fall of the Six and 7.2 km (4.5 mi) from the railway bridge in Saint-Adelphe. This drop is in a forested area without paths;
7. Manitou fall, between Saint-Adelphe and Saint-Stanislas (Les Chenaux);
8. Falls to Jimmy;
9. Falls to Murphy to Saint-Stanislas (Les Chenaux);

The river has some rapids or falls between Notre-Dame-de-Montauban and Saint-Adelphe. The Fall of the two and Fall of manitou are located in the latter locality.

The Batiscan River falls are numbered from 1 to 10, from Saint-Narcisse going back to Notre-Dame-de-Montauban. 4–7 drops are less crowded because less accessible, being located in wilderness areas.

Lower Batiscanie

Note: Lower Batiscanie lies between the mouth of the Batiscan River and the foot of the Falls to Murphy, Saint-Stanislas Les Chenaux

1. Fall des Ailes (Fall of the Wings);
2. Ilets fall;
3. "Grande chute" (Great Fall) (altitude 15 m; 49 ft), in Saint-Narcisse (west side of the river) and Sainte-Geneviève-de-Batiscan (East side), where the Saint-Narcisse dam is built;
4. "chutes de la Cheminée" (Falls of the chimney) (altitude 15 metres) in Sainte-Geneviève-de-Batiscan.

The "Jesuit Journal" of April 20, 1657 reports from a trip fur trade on the Batiscan River, from April 20 to July 15, 1657, carried out by eight French from Trois-Rivières, with twenty canoes Algonquins. Starting from Trois-Rivières, the group passed 28 jumps on Batiscan River in 14 days, arriving at the end of their journey as of May 28, 1657. In total, the group crossed 74 jumps or portage. A French was then drowned.

The 1663 Charlevoix earthquake would have changed significantly the relief in the Batiscanie including the disappearance of jumps in the Batiscan River, the emergence of new rocks, flattening of some mountains, major cracks in the ground.

=== Hydrology ===
The watershed of the Batiscan has an area of 4,690 km^{2} (1,810 sq mi). Its flow, which is measured at the central Saint-Narcisse is 96 m^{3} (3,400 cu ft)/s. Flow has however a strong seasonal variation, with a maximum of 937 m^{3} (33,100 cu ft)/s in May and a minimum of unity 7.9 m^{3} (280 cu ft)/s in September. The last 18 km (11 mi) unit, Batiscan River empties into the St. Lawrence River. At the mouth of the river, tides are up to 1.5 m (4 ft 11 in).

The basin is composed of a hundred rivers. The main rivers which are tributaries of the Batiscan, from upstream to downstream, are the river Castor noir, Lightning River, Jeannotte, Miguick, Rivière-à-Pierre, Tawachiche and Rivière-des-Envies.

The basin includes a thousand lakes. The largest lakes are Lac Édouard 25.2 km^{2} (9.7 sq mi), Batiscan 9.7 km^{2} (3.7 sq mi), Lac-aux-Sables 5.31 km^{2} (2.05 sq mi), Masketsi 4.01 km^{2} (1.55 sq mi), Lac-à-la-Tortue (Turtle Lake) 3.39 km^{2} (1.31 sq mi), Lake Jesuit 3.32 km^{2} (1.28 sq mi) and Roberge 1.89 km^{2} (0.73 sq mi). In the catchment area of the Batiscan River, more than 85 dams of various sizes were identified, seven of which have a height of more than 5 m (16 ft).

=== Forest industry ===
From 1852 the William Price and Company began to exploit the forest. Several sawmills were built on the Batiscan River and Rivière des Envies. The timber was transported by water flow, requiring that workers had to drave the logs. The first trees were cut the White Pine sent to Great Britain. From the 1930, activities of logging turned and served rather to papers mills. In 1963 the log drive was abandoned on the Batiscan.

=== Former Saint Narcisse Electric Central ===
In 1896, Jean-Baptiste Frégault bought the North Shore Power Company and buy production rights on the Great Waterfall near Saint-Narcisse. There he built a hydroelectric plant and a high-voltage line of 29 kilometres (18 mi), the first of the British Empire. The plant was expanded in 1905. In 1907, it was sold to the Shawinigan Water & Power Company. The latter was replaced by a new central Saint-Narcisse in 1926. In 1963, it was acquired by Hydro-Quebec during the nationalization of electricity. This central Saint-Narcisse has a capacity of 15 MW. The Saint-Narcisse dam is the largest one with a length of 254 metres (833 ft) and a height of 21 metres (69 ft) from the river bed. Its reservoir covers 43 hectares (110 acres).

=== Forges and mineral resources ===
Iron deposits were exploited from the 18th century until the early 20th century. Two forges were opened in the watershed, the "Forges de Batiscan", between 1798 and 1813, and "Forges de Saint-Tite", between 1870 and 1888. A zinc and lead deposit was exploited in Notre-Dame-de-Montauban in 1911 and 1965. A copper and nickel deposit was exploited to Lake Édouard in 1973 and 1974.

=== Bridges ===
Major bridges built over the Batiscan River (from the mouth):

Lower Batiscanie

1. Bridge of road 138, Principale street, in Batiscan, built at about 500 meters upstream from the Batiscan river mouth emptying in St. Lawrence River;
2. Batiscan railway bridge, built at about 800 meters upstream from the bridge of road 138;
3. Two bridges of Highway 40, in Sainte-Geneviève-de-Batiscan, built at about 2500 meters above the Batiscan railway bridge;
4. Sainte-Geneviève-de-Batiscan bridge, located at the height of the village (in front of the church), built at about 2.5 km upstream from the Highway 40 bridge, connecting Church Street (north shore) and the road of the village of Champlain (south shore). The first toll bridge was built in 1870 to replace the ferry, but unfortunately the bridge was washed away in 1896. The ferry system is restored for two months. In 1917, flood waters caused the collapse of one of the arches of the bridge. The municipality then acquires the bridge and repairs. This bridge existed until 1968 when it was demolished to be replaced by the current bridge.
5. Passerelle pedestrian crossing the river to almost one kilometre from the water (or 550 meters in a straight line) downstream of the dam of Saint-Narcisse;
6. Saint-Narcisse electric dam;
7. Bridge for pedestrians built at the falls in Murphy, located 3.3 km from water (or 2.5 km direct line) upstream of the dam of Saint-Narcisse.

Mid Batiscanie

1. Saint-Stanislas (Des Chenaux) bridge, located at the height of the village, built at about 8.5 km upstream of the dam of Saint-Narcisse;
2. Cement bridge of Saint-Adelphe, located at the height of the rue du Moulin in the village, about 15.5 km upstream from the bridge of Saint-Stanislas (Des Chenaux) bridge,
3. Covered wooden bridge of Saint-Adelphe, upstream of the other bridge built in cement. Wooden bridge was built in 1924 and demolished in 1965, after the construction of the cement bridge. Covered Bridge had a pedestrian sidewalk on the southeast side;
4. Saint-Adelphe Railway Bridge linking row St-Pie and row Haut-St-Emile, built at about 2.8 km upstream from the bridge of the village. The railway bridge Saint-Adelphe was built in 1907. Trains have circulated for 100 years. The old iron bridge was decommissioned in 2007.
5. Lac-aux-Sables bridge, linking the village and the road of row Price leading to Saint-Ubalde, about 14 km upstream of the railway bridge of Saint-Adelphe. The covered wooden bridge spanning the Batiscan, between the village and the road of row Price, was built in 1900. It was destroyed by fire on June 14, 1950. The bridge was rebuilt in 1952.
6. Notre-Dame-de-Montauban bridge, located at the height of the village, built at about 12 km upstream from the bridge of Lac-aux-Sables.
7. Railway bridge, located 4.2 km upstream from the bridge of Notre-Dame-de-Montauban. This bridge allows the train from Hervey-Jonction to head to Rivière-à-Pierre, along Rousseau road (route 367).

Upper Batiscanie

1. Talbot Road bridge at kilometre no. 102 or 13.5 km from the river upstream from the mouth (km no. 88.5) of Rivière-à-Pierre. Between kilometre 102 and 88.5, the river has many rapids, some suitable for experienced kayakers. The Talbot bridge allows the Portneuf Wildlife Reserve to serve its territory lying west of the river Batiscan, especially larger lakes such Gilardeau, Lapeyrène, Robinson and Lake Travers.
2. Bridge of "Ile-à-la-Croix" (Island of the cross (Quebec)), located at the northern limit of the Portneuf Wildlife Reserve for part of the territory east of the river Batiscan. The bridge also provides access to the road leading to the northern part of the reserve, on the west side of the river Batiscan.
3. Bridge railway sector Beaudet, located at 9 km upstream from the northern boundary of the Portneuf Wildlife Reserve or 19.8 miles north of Island of the cross (Quebec) ("Ile-à-la-Croix"). Through this railway bridge, the train goes north along the right bank.
4. Road bridge spanning the straits of Lake of the cross (Lac-Édouard) (Lac-à-la-Croix). This route can reach the discharge at the mouth of a tributary of Lake of the cross (Lac-Édouard) (fed upstream to Lake Biscuits and John Bull).
5. Road Bridge located in 250 metres (820 ft). below the railway bridge (or 0, 5 kilometres (3.1 mi) lake Cross), in the Lordship of Triton.
6. Railway Bridge, located 8.5 km downstream of the station of Lake Édouard (Haute-Mauricie) by rail, allowing the train back on the left side, and back to the north.
7. Road Bridge located at 1.1 kilometres (0.68 mi) by water, below the railway bridge. This road bridge connects the forest road housing the river on the left bank and reach the Lordship of Triton.
8. Railway Bridge, located 2 km downstream from the bridge above the river and 4.3 km from the station of Lake Édouard (Haute-Mauricie) by the railroad.
9. Road bridge, built next to the last railway bridge at the head of the river is 2.3 km from the railway station of the city of Lake Édouard (Haute-Mauricie).
10. Railway Bridge, located one kilometre from Lake Édouard (Haute-Mauricie) by water or 2.3 km from the station of Lake Édouard (Haute-Mauricie) by the railroad.
11. Lock at the discharge of Edward Lake built in 1897 on the pass of the river. The lock surmounted by a bridge, used to manage the water level, to facilitate the transport of wood floating to sawmills in the village. Following the 1902 major forest fire, forest contractors have abandoned the region and the lock was abandoned. Unfortunately, the lock gave way in the great flood of spring 1928.

Note: In summary, 19 road bridges (or other infrastructure) and seven railway bridges span the river Batiscan throughout its course.

== Hydroelectric Power Plant ==
The central Saint-Narcisse is the only hydroelectric power plant ever built on the Batiscan river. However, two power plants have been built on the tributaries of the river Batiscan:

- Plant "Electric Kabibouska" erected on the Rivière des Envies, Proulxville was serving the village of Saint-Séverin and the inhabitants of Saint-Tite;
- The power plant fitted to the dam of "Chutes de la Marmite" on the Rivière-à-Pierre, upstream of "Lake Farm" (said "Deposit lake") northeast of the village. This plant served the town of Rivière-à-Pierre, especially industries.

== Main Attractions ==
=== Waterfall of Five Dollars Bill ===
The Waterfall of the Nine (popularly designated "Waterfall of the five dollars bill") is located approximately 0.5 km upstream of the village of Notre-Dame-de-Montauban. Scenic view is beautiful from the waterfront park (referred Park of the Waterfall) or from the bridge over the Batiscan at the level of the village, or "Bar of the Waterfall" (east side of the river). This waterfall has a great resemblance to the image on the old five Canadian dollars bill. Public park built around the falls attracts many visitors. Eight trails were built around the Park of the Waterfall, by the local Cooperative Montauban, one joined the Otis Mountain (325 m.). In addition, an elevated walkway leads visitors on a small island in the middle of the rapids. This park around the falls began to be built in 1977, for the centenary of the parish of Notre-Dame-des-Anges.

=== Batiscan Park (Saint-Narcisse) ===
Covering an area of 400 hectares (990 acres), the regional Batiscan River Park is dotted with waterfalls, rapids and pools in the grip of Saint-Narcisse dam. The park which is bisected by the River Batiscan, has a long elevated walkway crossing the river, many lookouts and a network of trails totaling 25 kilometres, connecting three municipalities: Saint-Stanislas (Des Chenaux), Saint-Narcisse and Sainte-Geneviève-de-Batiscan. This park offers a range of educational activities on the environment, outdoor activities and historical thematics.

=== See also ===
Related Articles:

- Guide to Identification of Frequently Fished Species in Batiscan River (in French)
- Batiscanie
- Island of the cross (Quebec), in Portneuf Wildlife Reserve

Municipalities:

- Lake Edward
- Rivière-à-Pierre
- Notre-Dame-de-Montauban
- Lac-aux-Sables
- Sainte-Thècle
- Saint-Adelphe
- Saint-Stanislas
- Saint-Narcisse
- Sainte-Geneviève-de-Batiscan
- Batiscan

ZEC, Wildlife Reserve and parks:

- Portneuf Wildlife Reserve
- Batiscan River Park
- Central of Saint-Narcisse

Rivers:

- Rivière des Envies
- Tawachiche River
- Pierre-Paul River
- Propre River, Quebec
- Tawachiche River
- Tawachiche West River
- List of rivers of Quebec

RCM (MRC in French), Lorship (Seigneuries):

- La Tuque
- Portneuf Regional County Municipality
- Mékinac Regional County Municipality
- Les Chenaux Regional County Municipality
- Lordship of Batiscan (Seigneurie de Batiscan)

Non-Organized territories:

- Linton
- Lac-Lapeyrère, Quebec
- Lac-Masketsi, Quebec
