= Rivière aux Éclairs =

Rivière aux Éclairs Old name: "Rivière du lac Batiscan"
- "Rivière aux Éclairs", in Lac-Blanc, Quebec (unorganised territory), in Batiscanie, in Quebec

Location
- Country: Canada
- Province: Quebec
- Region: Capitale-Nationale
- Regional County Municipality: Portneuf Regional County Municipality
- Unorganized territory and a municipality: Linton

Physical characteristics
- Source: Batiscan Lake
  - location: Lac-Croche
  - coordinates: 47.36°N 71.91778°W
  - elevation: 389
- Mouth: Batiscan River
  - location: Linton
  - coordinates: 47.38639°N 72.16084°W
  - elevation: 310 km (190 mi)
- Length: 12 km (7.5 mi)
- Basin size: 294 km^{2} (114 sq mi)

Basin features
- Tributaries
  - left: (Upward from the mouth) Unidentified stream, outlet of Lac des Saginnes, outlet of Hubert, Cudas and Morteau lakes, outlet of Lake Daniel, unidentified stream, outlet of Lirette lake, outlet of Séné, Constantin and Guernon lakes, unidentified stream.
  - right: (Upward from the mouth) Discharge from Lac aux Confins, unidentified stream, outlet from Receiver and Fog lakes, unidentified stream, unidentified stream, outlet from Romulus and Remus lakes, four unidentified streams, rivière à Moïse, unidentified stream (via Batiscan Lake), Croche River (Batiscan Lake) (via Batiscan Lake).

The rivière aux Éclairs (French pronunciation: [ʁivjɛʁ oz‿eklɛʁ], Lightning River) flows on 12 kilometres (7.5 mi) in Upper Batiscanie in the province of Quebec, Canada, in the southwest direction. This river is located in the Zec de la Rivière-Blanche and is a tributary on the left bank of the Batiscan River. The watershed of the Lightning River is 294 km², the fifth largest pool of Batiscanie.

== Geography ==
Its mouth is located at km 147 of the Batiscan River, on 43 kilometres (27 mi) of Batiscan barrier at the end of the "Hell's Gates" sector. The lightning river has its source from the discharge of Batiscan Lake. This very serpentine river turns to be the boundary between the Portneuf Regional County Municipality and La Jacques-Cartier Regional County Municipality, in the region of Capitale-Nationale. The lightning river is surrounded by high mountain and cliffs on both sides, including Mount View (Latitude. 47.40425913°; Longitude -72.016266153°) on the left bank.

Each year, the river is usually frozen from November to April. The water level of the river varies seasonally and depending on rainfall. Navigable river periods are preferably in the spring, early summer or when rainfall increases the flow of the river significantly. The falls on the lightning river has some and numerous rapids types R2, R2-3, R3 and R3-4. For the descent of the river with small boats, the start is usually on Batiscan Lake. It is also possible to go upper up to six km, on the Moïse River (Quebec), adding about 15 kilometres (9.3 mi) to the shuttle.

From Rivière-à-Pierre, the access road to Batiscan Lake is the road no. 2 in Portneuf Wildlife Reserve, where each visitor has to register at the reception desk station. Then, visitors must register for the Zec de la Rivière-Blanche, if he wants to stay overnight. The visitor continues on Highway 2, then turn right on Highway 27. Then just follow the signs indicating "Zec de la Rivière-Blanche". Green road signs guide visitors to the path of Batiscan Lake. The visitor leaves the road 27 at 44 km. The website of the Zec de la Rivière-Blanche indicates that wooden roads are closed in the spring thaw period.

== Toponymy ==
The French name "Rivière aux éclairs" (Lightning River) was formalized in the register of the Commission de toponymie du Québec (Geographical Names Board of Quebec), on December 5, 1968. Formerly, the river was designated "rivière du Lac Batiscan" (river of Batiscan Lake). In 1918 the Geographic Board of Quebec recognized the name "Rivière aux éclairs" (lightning river), indicating that the latter name was in use before the name "Rivière du lac Batiscan" (river of Batiscan Lake). Some topographic maps published from 1920 made mention of "Rivière aux éclairs" (River of Lightning). This name evokes a natural phenomenon, already included in the 1914 edition of the Dictionary of rivers and lakes in the province of Quebec. However, the origin of this name is unknown.

The "lightning river" is aptly named. On the one hand, the height of the surrounding mountains make more likely to get hit by lightnings. On the other hand, the "lightning river", the Batiscan Lake and Moïse River (upstream) are enclosed between steep walls of the surrounding mountains, echoing thunder, giving the impression that the storms are stronger in this sector.

== See also ==
- Zec de la Rivière-Blanche
- Batiscanie
- Batiscan River
- Portneuf Wildlife Reserve
- List of rivers of Quebec

MRC ou municipalités:

- Portneuf Regional County Municipality
- La Tuque
- Municipality of Lac-Édouard
- Municipality of Rivière-à-Pierre
