= Batiscan Lake =

Lake in Quebec, Canada

- Location within Quebec
- Location: Quebec in Canada
- Coordinates: 47°21′36″N 71°55′04″W
- Lake type: Natural
- Basin countries: Canada
- Max. length: 6.35 km (3.95 mi)
- Max. width: 0.5 km (0.31 mi)

The Batiscan Lake is located in Upper Batiscanie and is the limit of unorganized territories of Lac-Blanc (White Lake) and Lac-Croche. This territory is related to the La Jacques-Cartier Regional County Municipality, in the administrative region of the Capitale-Nationale, in the province of Quebec, Canada.

Shape while length (6.35 km by 0.5 km at the widest in the East-West direction), the Batiscan lake marks the southwestern boundary of the Laurentides Wildlife Reserve and the northeastern boundary of the Zec de la Rivière-Blanche.

Shaped in length, in the East-West direction, the size of the lake is 6.35 km by 0.5 km at the widest. The Batiscan Lake marks the southwest boundary of the Laurentides Wildlife Reserve and the northeastern boundary of the Zec de la Rivière-Blanche.

Fueled mainly by the Croche River (La Tuque) coming from northeast, Batiscan lake drains into the Lightning River which joins 15 kilometres (9.3 mi) to the west, the Batiscan River. The Croche River (La Tuque) is powered by the Lac Croche.

The Moïse River, coming from the north, flows into the Lightning River just at the mouth of Lake Batiscan. The Moïse River is powered by Moïse Lake which in turn is fed by three smaller rivers. The Moïse Lake marks the boundary of the southwest boundary of the Laurentides Wildlife Reserve and the north boundary of the Zec de la Rivière-Blanche.

== Toponymy ==
In 1873, the Surveyor Pascal Dumais Horace wrote that the heights of the lake, you could see the mountain range west of the Saint-Maurice River, the whole area of Lac-Édouard, Quebec, the valley of the Bostonnais River and that of the Métabetchouane.

The name "Batiscan Lake" was officially registered at the Commission de toponymie du Québec, as of December 5, 1968. The name "Batiscan Lake" is sometimes confused in the use of the place name "Petit Lac Batiscan", which is located in the municipality of Saint-Raymond. Batiscan lake is considered the second head of the river of the same name, especially through the Moïse River (Quebec) and other rivers that feed it. French place names in Canada, it is natural to associate the name for a lake head and toponym discharge.

=== See also ===
- Batiscanie, Quebec
- Batiscan River
- Lightning River
- Croche River (La Tuque)
- Moïse River (Quebec)
- Portneuf Wildlife Reserve
- Laurentides Wildlife Reserve
- Zec de la Rivière-Blanche

MRC and municipalities :

- La Jacques-Cartier Regional County Municipality
- La Tuque
- Municipality of Lac-Édouard, Quebec
