= Moïse River =

Location
- Country: Canada

Physical characteristics
- Mouth
  - coordinates: 47.39056°N 71.98722°W
- Length: 18 km (11 mi)
- Basin size: 301.56 km^{2} (116.43 sq mi)

The Moïse river (French: Rivière à Moïse) is located in the Laurentides Wildlife Reserve in Upper Batiscanie in the administrative area of the Capitale-Nationale, about 80 kilometres (50 mi) northwest of Quebec City. Moïse River is part of unorganized territory of Lac-Croche in Regional County Municipality (RCM) of Jacques-Cartier. The watershed of the Moïse river is 301.56 square kilometres (116.43 sq mi), the fourth largest pool of Batiscanie.

Lakes Moïses, Rainville, Charcoal and Montendre discharge into the Moïse river, which in turn flows into the Lightning River (south-west) downstream of the mouth of Batiscan Lake, Quebec in addition to two large notes, the course of the river to Moïse is not winding over a length of about 18 km, between the mouth of Moïse lake and Lightning River.

== Toponymy ==
The name " River Moïse" was formalized on December 5, 1968, at the Commission de toponymie du Québec. According to the commission, the surveyor's report clearly indicates Félix Pagé the presence of the river and Lake Moïse in 1887. Since 1886, when the lake is located in the large private estate Triton Tract Alexander Luders Light (1822–1894), former chief engineer of the railways to the Quebec government. In 1893, Triton was converted into Tract club hunting and fishing. Now, it is designated the Triton Fish and Game Club. A few years later, several highly renowned personalities from the Canada, the United States or even Great Britain, came to fish, such as John D. Rockefeller, Theodore Roosevelt, Wilfrid Laurier, Lomer Gouin and Winston Churchill.

In August 1887, Edward Panet, notary Saint-Raymond goes to Moïse Lake (Quebec), with three friends to fish, assisted by four guides, including Moïses and Alexis Christmas. Moses is a Huron Jeune Lorette, today Wendake, a suburb north of the Quebec City. The name of one of the guides there a link with the name of both the river and the lake? For now, there is no evidence to support this thesis corporative.

== See also ==
- Zec de la Rivière-Blanche
- Batiscanie, Quebec
- Batiscan River
- Batiscan Lake, Quebec
- Lightning River
- Portneuf Wildlife Reserve
- Laurentides Wildlife Reserve

MRC and municipalities :

- La Jacques-Cartier Regional County Municipality
- La Tuque
- Municipality of Lac-Édouard
