= Linton, Quebec =

Linton
- Unorganized territory
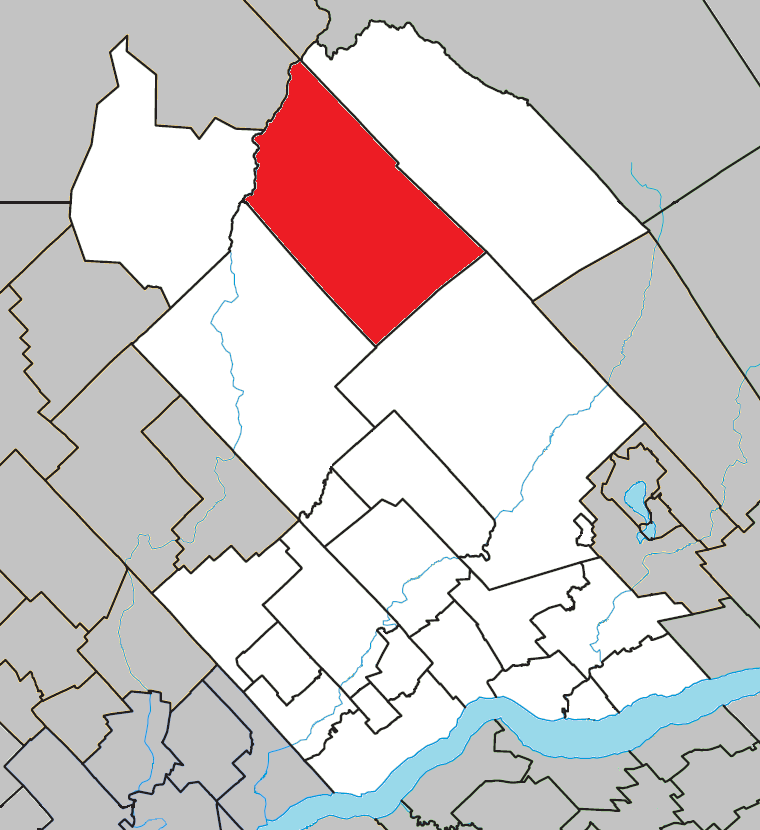
- Location within Portneuf RCM

- Location in central Quebec
- Coordinates: 47°15′N 72°15′W
- Country: Canada
- Province: Quebec
- Region: Capitale-Nationale
- RCM: Portneuf
- Constituted: unspecified

Government
  - Fed. riding: Saint-Augustin—Portneuf—Jacques-Cartier
  - Prov. riding: Portneuf

Area
  - Total: 465.13 km^{2} (179.59 sq mi)
  - Land: 429.62 km^{2} (165.88 sq mi)

Population (2021)
  - Total: 10
  - Density: 0/km^{2} (0/sq mi)
  - Pop (2016-21): ▲ N/A
  - Dwellings: 49
- Time zone: UTC−5 (EST)
  - Summer (DST): UTC−4 (EDT)
- Highways: No major routes

Linton is an unorganized territory in the Capitale-Nationale region of Quebec, Canada, in the north of the Portneuf Regional County Municipality. It is named after the hamlet of Linton that is located along the Canadian National Railway and the Batiscan River (47°15′34″N 72°14′41″W).

It is entirely protected within the Portneuf Wildlife Reserve, Zec de la Rivière-Blanche, and Zec Batiscan-Neilson.

== Demographics ==
Historical census populations – Linton, Quebec
Year	Pop.	±%
1991	0	—
1996	0	0.00%
2001	0	0.00%
2006	32	—
2011	0	−100.0%
2016	0	0.00%
2021	10	—
Source: Statistics Canada

Private dwellings occupied by usual residents (2021): 7 (total dwellings: 49)
