= Zec Batiscan-Neilson =

- Location within Quebec
- Location: Canada, Quebec, Portneuf Regional County Municipality
- Nearest city: Saint-Raymond
- Coordinates: 47°11′N 71°52′W
- Area: 878 square kilometres (339 sq mi)
- Established: 1978
- Administrator: Association sportive Batiscan-Neilson de la région Saint-Raymond inc.

The Zec Batiscan-Neilson is a "zone d'exploitation contrôlée" (Controlled Harvesting Zone), ("ZEC" in French) located in the unorganized territory of Lac-Blanc, in Portneuf Regional County Municipality, in the administrative area of the Capitale-Nationale, on the north shore of St. Lawrence River, in Quebec, Canada.

== History ==
In 1978, following the abolition of private clubs by the Government of Québec, Zec Batiscan-Neilson was incorporated.

== Geography ==
The territory of the ZEC is part of the watershed of Sainte-Anne River which flows into the St. Lawrence River at Sainte-Anne-de-la-Pérade. Zec is bounded on the north by the Zec de la Rivière-Blanche and Laurentians Wildlife Reserve.

The northern tip of the key Zec southeast end of Batiscan Lake, Quebec. The territory of the ZEC has 356 lakes.

ZEC has a triangle shape which is butchered in part by the valley of the Neilson River and a small area.

== Toponymy ==
The name "Zec Batiscan-Neilson" originates from the Neilson river flowing in Canton Neilson, from the north end of the territory of the ZEC. This river flows first south, then turns west. It leaves the territory by redirecting back to the south, and joins the Sainte-Anne River.

Neilson township is located fifty kilometers northwest of Quebec City, and has an irregular shape. Crossed by the river Neilson, this particular canton includes lakes Aaron and Picard. This township is located in the extension of the lordship Saint-Gabriel and fief Hubert.

Adopted around 1916, the name Neilson Township honors John Neilson (1776–1848) for his work in public life. He contributed greatly to the development of the region since the early nineteenth century. Originally from Scotland, he came to live with his brother Samuel, who was acquired the Quebec Gazette. In 1793, John inherited the newspaper and printing. Upon reaching his majority in 1796, he became editor-owner of the weekly. Around 1816, Neilson helped for recruiting European settlers, mostly Irish, and encouraged them to settle in neighboring lordships Township is an area which later became Valcartier. John Neilson was elected several times member of County of Quebec. He completed his final term as MP from 1842 to 1844 in the Parliament of Canada Uni.

The name "Zec Batiscan-Neilson" was recorded on August 5, 1982, at the Bank of place names in Commission de toponymie du Québec (Geographical Names Board of Québec)

== See also ==
- Sainte-Anne River
- Rivière-à-Pierre
- Saint-Raymond
- Laurentides Wildlife Reserve
- Portneuf Regional County Municipality
- Batiscan Lake, Quebec
- Zone d'exploitation contrôlée (Controlled Harvesting Area) (ZEC)
