= Zec de la Rivière-Blanche =

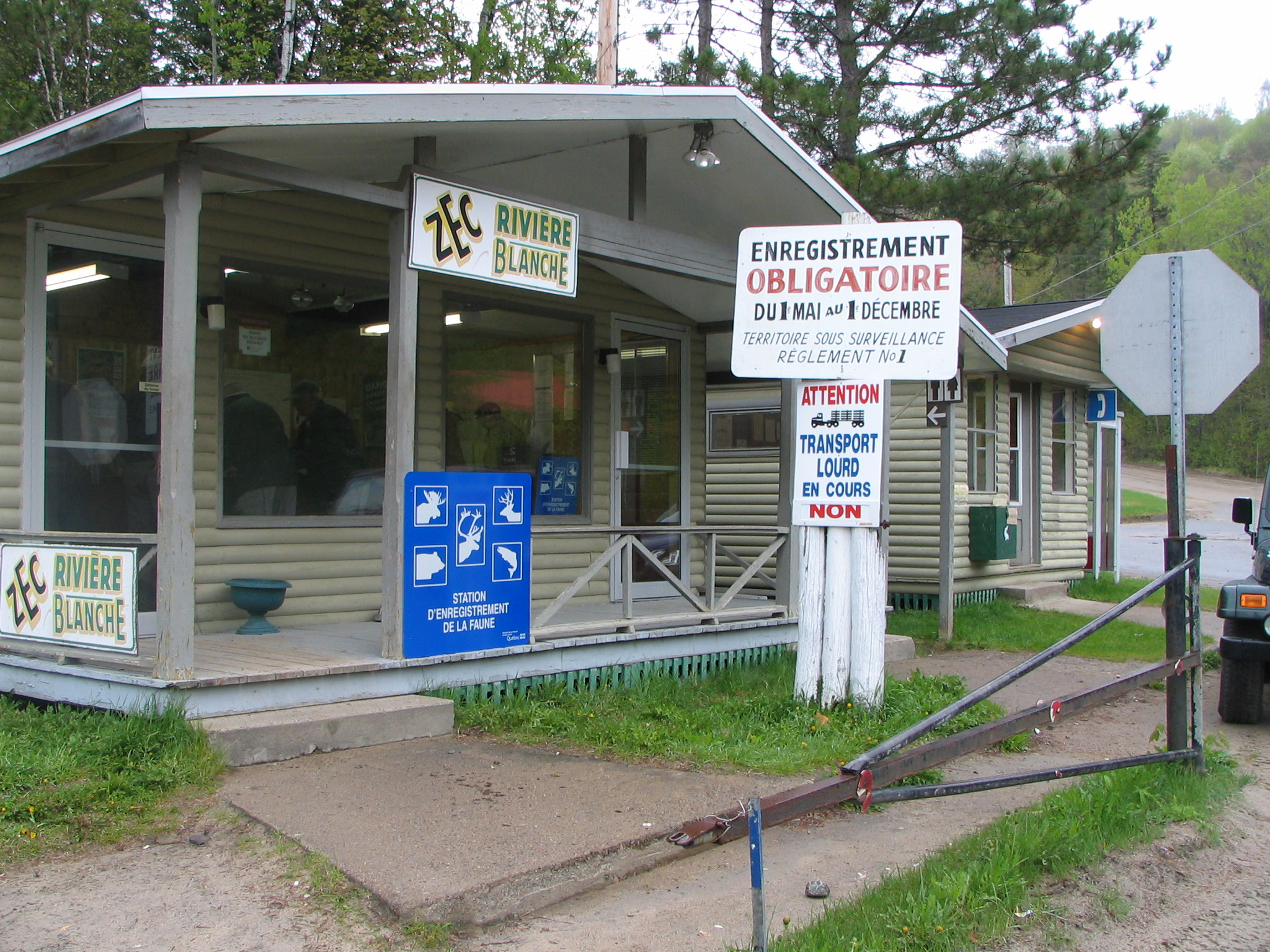
- Reception & check-in station, entrance Rivière à Pierre

- Location within Quebec
- Location: Portneuf Regional County Municipality; La Tuque, in Québec, Canada
- Nearest city: Lac-Édouard, Quebec, La Tuque, Quebec and Rivière-à-Pierre, Quebec
- Coordinates: 47°18′N 72°05′W
- Area: 729.0 square kilometres (281.5 sq mi)
- Established: 1978
- Governing body: L'Association sportive Miguick inc

The Zec de la Rivière-Blanche (or ZEC of White River, in English) is a zone d'exploitation contrôlée ('controlled harvesting zone') (ZEC), located in the unorganized territory of Lac-Blanc, Quebec, in Portneuf Regional County Municipality, in Upper Batiscanie, in the administrative area of the Capitale-Nationale, on the north shore of St. Lawrence River, Quebec, Canada.

== Information and access roads ==
ZEC de la Rivière-Blanche is particularly renowned for tourist activities such as hunting, fishing, camping, water sports, and expeditions in the forest. On its website, L'Association sportive Miguick, Inc. (ASM) publishes various calendars, including for fishing, hunting, opening and closing of water bodies, and forest operations. Fans can thus refer to for planning their outdoors activities.

The only position ZEC Home is located at Falls of Marmite, 4.4 km northeast of the town of Rivière-à-Pierre. From the village of Rivière-à-Pierre, the main access road to the ZEC consists of a stretch of 30 km through the Portneuf Wildlife Reserve (routes 2 and 29).

In the ZEC, the road network comprises 130 km of motorable road. The road north of the Lightning River provides access to a dozen lakes such as Seaton, Montplaisir and des Passes, as well as Moïse River. The Batiscan Lake is accessible by land or by boat using the Moïse River.

The ZEC has four campgrounds semi-fitted around the lakes Batiscan, White, La Salle and Lietto.

== History ==
In 1978, following the abolition of private clubs by the Government of Québec, ZEC de la Rivière-Blanche was formed, initially covering an area of 449 square kilometres (173 sq mi) in the Portneuf County, Quebec. ZEC has been administered by the L'Association sportive Miguick, Inc. (Athletic Association Miguick) (ASM).

In the early 1980s, the land area was increased by 280 square kilometres (110 sq mi) by adding a part of the famous Club hunting and fishing Seigneurie du Triton (Lordship of Triton). The present territory of the ZEC covers 729.0 square kilometres (281.5 sq mi).

== Geography ==
The territory of the ZEC is an integral part of the Batiscanie (watershed of Batiscan River). ZEC is bounded on the south by Portneuf Wildlife Reserve, on the west by the Zec Jeannotte, on the north by the Laurentides Wildlife Reserve and on the east by the Zec Batiscan-Neilson. The Batiscan River is the western boundary of ZEC, north of Miguick River.

The five main rivers are all exploited by ZEC for fishing activities:

- White River whose headwater lake is White Lake;
- Lightning River which rises in Batiscan Lake
- Moïse River
- Miguick River
- Batiscan River.

The territory of the ZEC includes 240 lakes, 150 are used for fishing, including lakes Brochu, Funny, Gaston and Gorren. Major lakes are:

- Batiscan Lake (east-west direction), which is the northeastern boundary of the territory of ZEC
- Lasalle Lake, located in the center of the ZEC
- The White Lake
- "Ci-joint lake"
- Constantin Lake

=== White River (Portneuf Regional County Municipality) ===
The White River covers a large catchment area (adjacent to the west side of the upper basin of the Rivière-à-Pierre), taking its source in White Lake where a dam is fitted at its mouth. More than a dozen small surrounding lakes flow into the White Lake. Down, the waters of the White River flow into a series of lakes to the village of Rivière-à-Pierre lakes Lupe, Ralph, Gilles, Tony, lietto and Lorenzo.

=== Portneuf Wildlife Reserve ===
The Portneuf Wildlife Reserve includes the middle part of the watershed of the White river. In back, the White River, we reached the southern boundary of the reserve, located in 6.3 kilometres (3.9 mi) (direct line) from the village of Rivière-à-Pierre. While the last water before the northern limit of the plans are the Central and Ferriere lakes. The northern part of the watershed of the White River is integrated into the Zec de la Rivière-Blanche, including lakes Lorenzo and Tonty.

== Toponymy ==
The following names are all interconnected and have been registered with the Bank of place names in Commission de toponymie du Québec (Geographical Names Board of Québec):

- "Unorganized Territory of Lac-Blanc, Quebec", registered on March 13, 1986,
- "Zec de la Rivière-Blanche", registered on August 5, 1982
- "White River", registered December 5, 1968,
- "White Lake", which is the largest lake in the Unorganized Territory of Lac-Blanc.

== Restoration of lakes ==
In 2012, with the financial participation of $81,500 in grants, four lakes of the Zec de la Rivière-Blanche have been treated: Lastre, Zigzag, Palme, Dual and Bert. This initiative will increase the potential for fishing. These partners are the Fondation de la faune du Québec, the Regional Conference of the Capitale-Nationale (implementation PDIRT), Ministry of Natural Resources (Phase II) and Guy Chevrette Foundation.

Restored in 2009, Swayne Lake is the first of the administrative region of Capitale-Nationale to have been restored. It was reopened to fishing in 2013. Followed, in 2014, lakes Quatre-Baies and Simard; and in 2016, the five lakes sub-basin of Lake Lastre. During the weekend of Easter 2013, the ZEC was featured in the issue "Semaine Verte" (Green Week) at Radio Canada, in a report on the restoration of lakes with rotenone.
