= Lac-Blanc, Quebec =

Lac-Blanc
- Unorganized territory
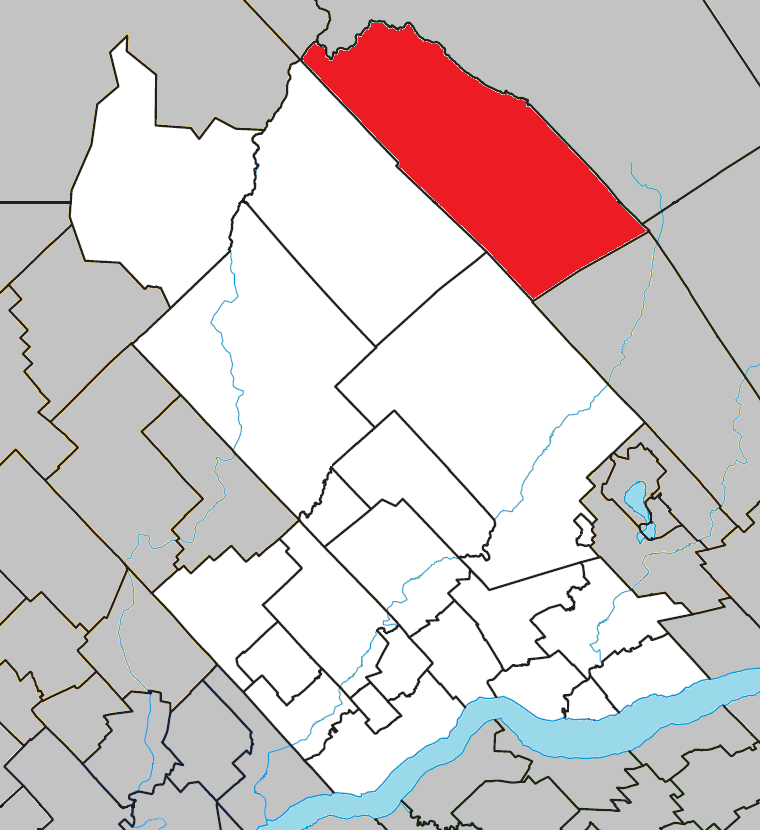
- Location within Portneuf RCM

- Location in central Quebec
- Coordinates: 47°17′N 72°01′W
- Country: Canada
- Province: Quebec
- Region: Capitale-Nationale
- RCM: Portneuf
- Constituted: January 1, 1986

Government
  - Fed. riding: Saint-Augustin—Portneuf—Jacques-Cartier
  - Prov. riding: Portneuf

Area
  - Total: 570.36 km^{2} (220.22 sq mi)
  - Land: 549.55 km^{2} (212.18 sq mi)

Population (2021)
  - Total: 0
  - Density: 0/km^{2} (0/sq mi)
  - Pop (2016–21): Steady
  - Dwellings: 6
- Time zone: UTC−5 (EST)
  - Summer (DST): UTC−4 (EDT)
- Highways: No major routes

Lac-Blanc (French pronunciation: [lak blɑ̃]) is an unorganized territory in the Capitale-Nationale region of Quebec, Canada, in the north-east of the Portneuf Regional County Municipality. This unorganized territory covers about 570 square kilometres (220 sq mi). The main namesake lake is oriented north–south. The discharge of this lake is at its southern point, where it flows into the Blanche River.

Almost its entire territory is part of Zec de la Rivière-Blanche and Zec Batiscan-Neilson.

== Demography ==
Historical census populations – Lac-Blanc, Quebec
Year	Pop.	±%
1991	4	—
1996	0	−100.0%
2001	0	0.00%
2006	20	—
2011	0	−100.0%
2016	0	0.00%
2021	0	0.00%
Source: Statistics Canada

Private dwellings occupied by usual residents in 2021: 0 (total dwellings: 6)

== See also ==
- Rivière-à-Pierre, municipality
- Batiscanie
- Batiscan River
- Portneuf Wildlife Reserve
- Laurentides Wildlife Reserve
