= Batiscanie =

Coordinates: 46.64°N 72.394°W

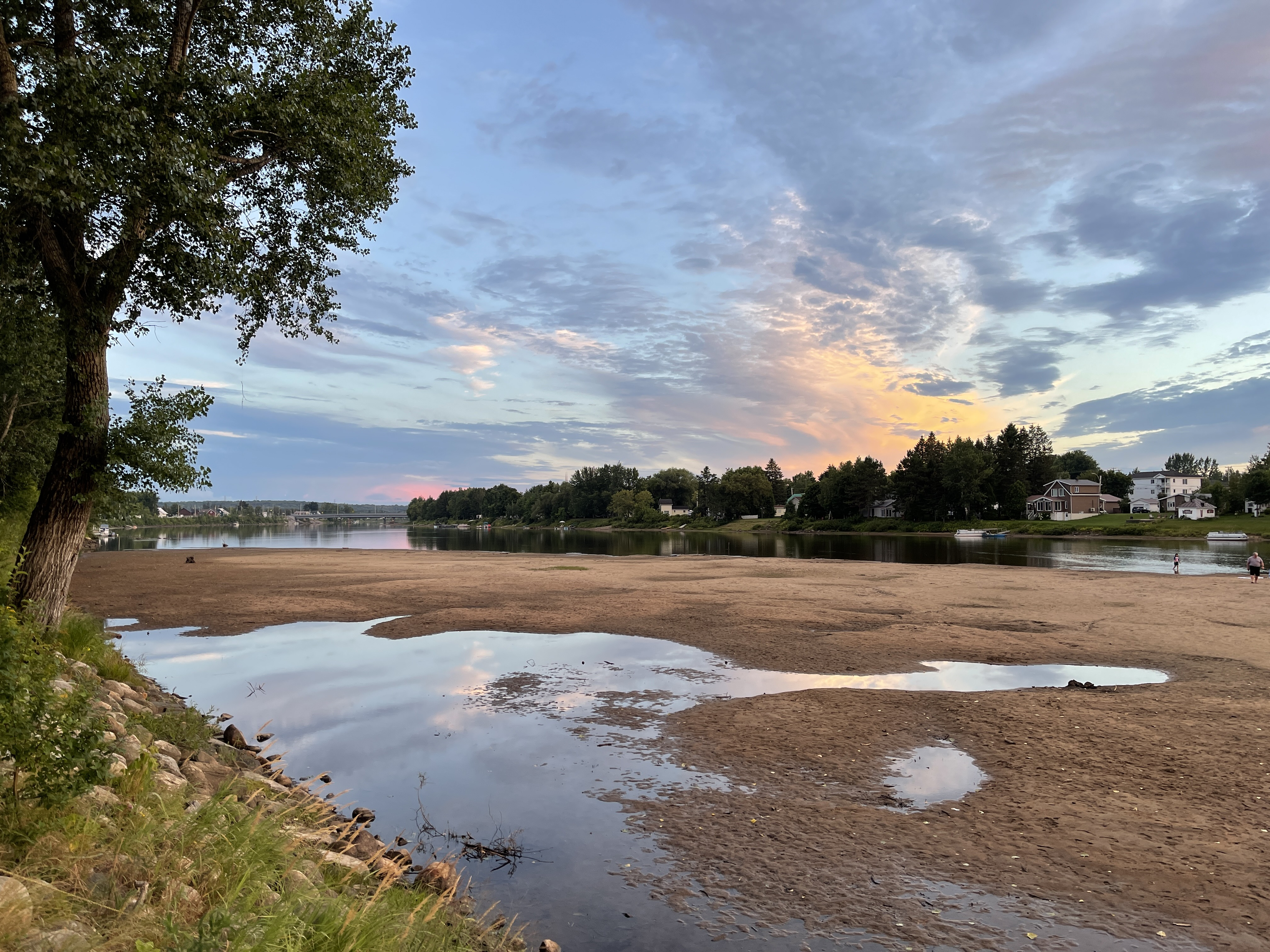
Batiscan River, rang de la Rivière Batiscan NE, Saint-Stanislas

Batiscanie is a name of a territory in the Mauricie region, covering the regional county municipalities of Les Chenaux, Portneuf, and Mékinac; in Quebec, Canada.

== Flora ==
On the Batiscan river's riparian strips

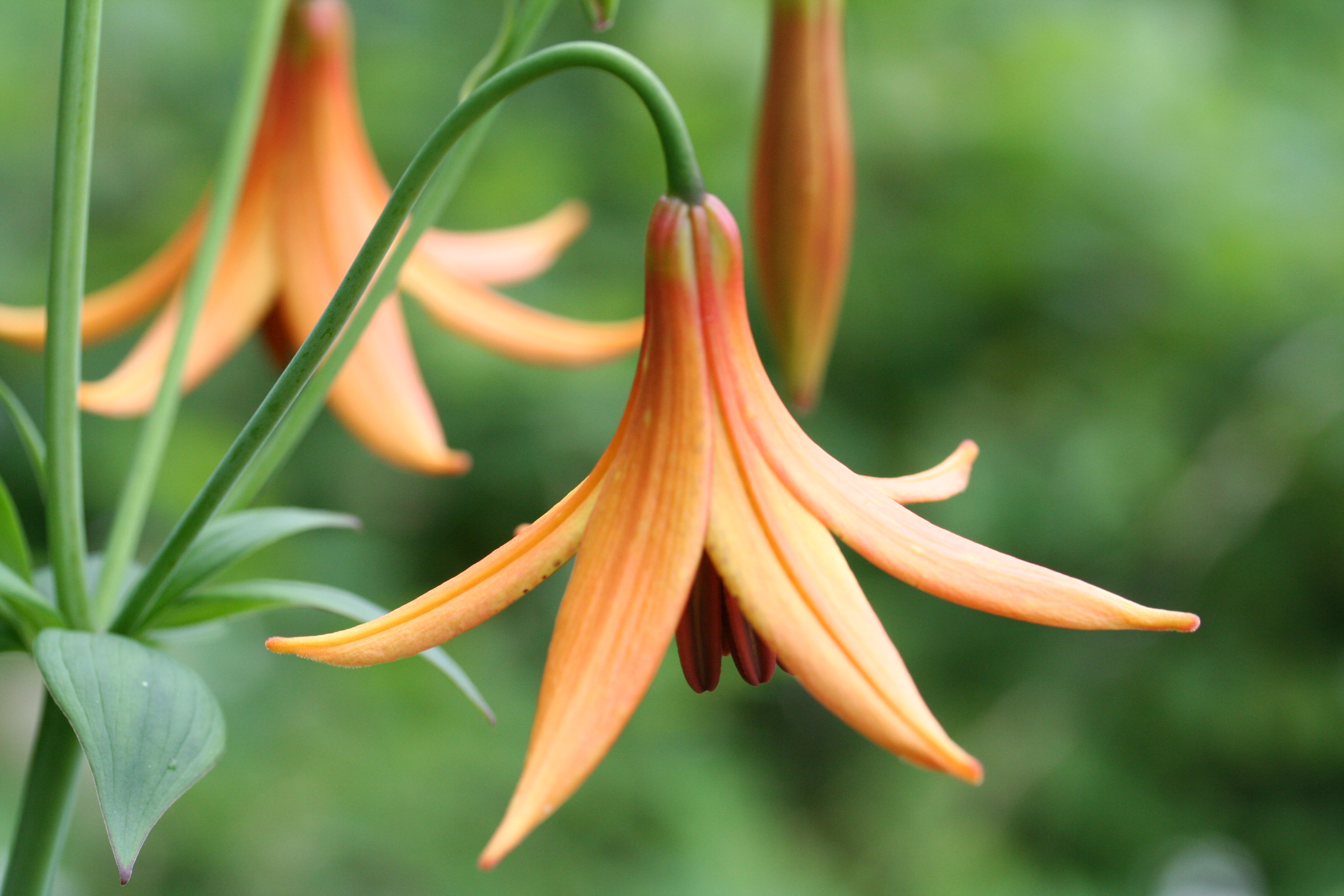
Lilium canadense L. — Wild yellow lily

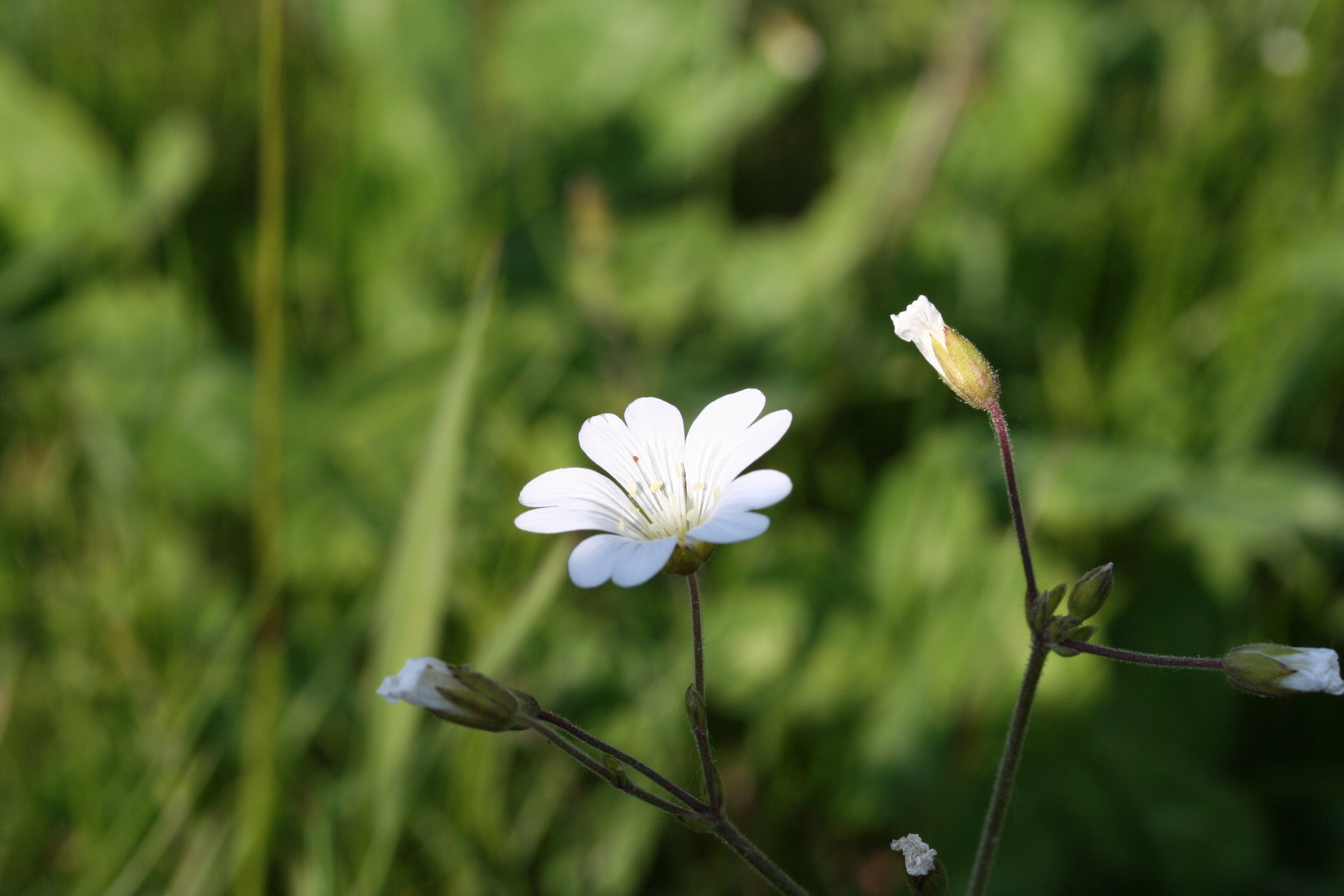
Cerastium arvense L. — Meadow chickweed

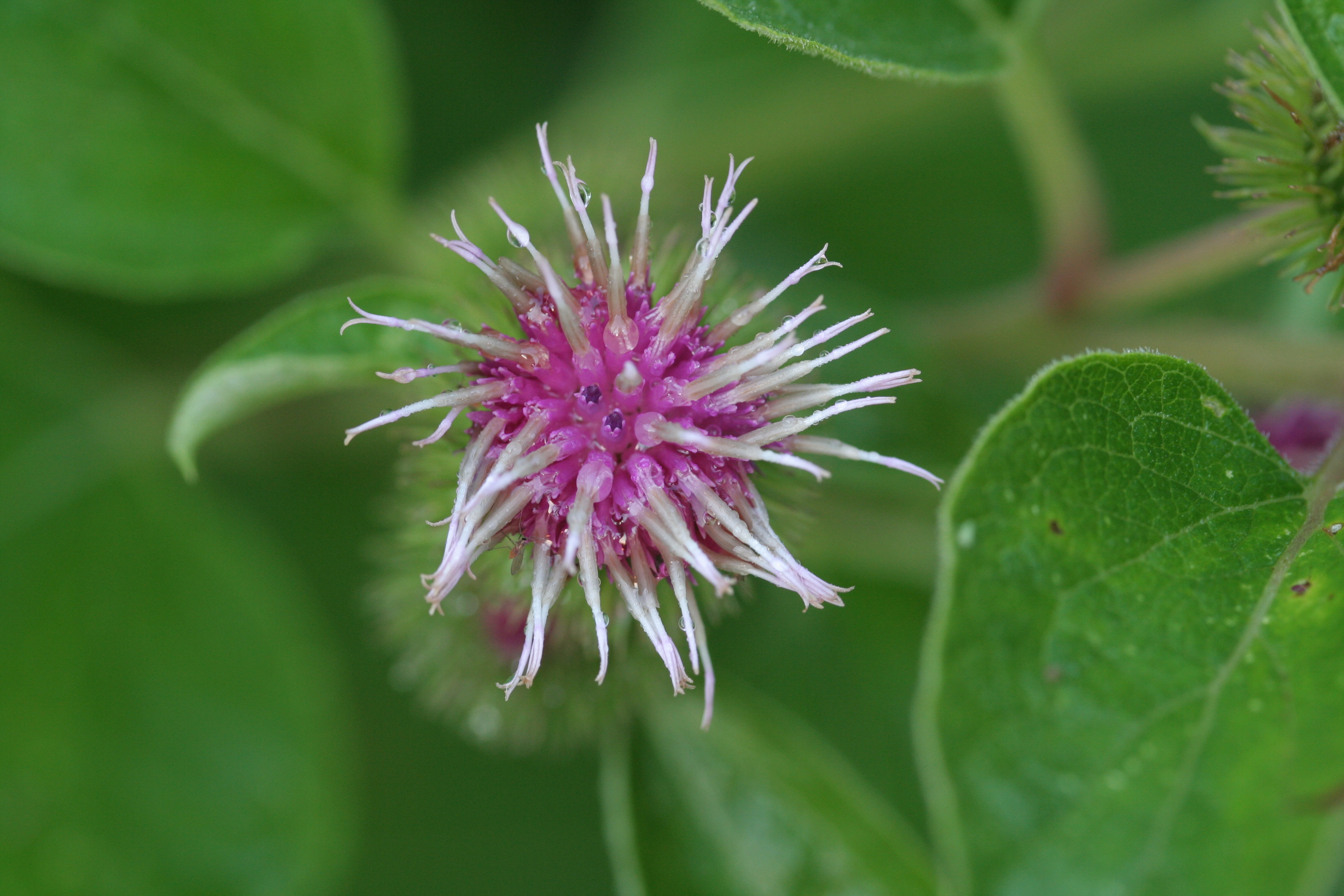
Arctium minus (Hill) Bernhardi — Common burdock

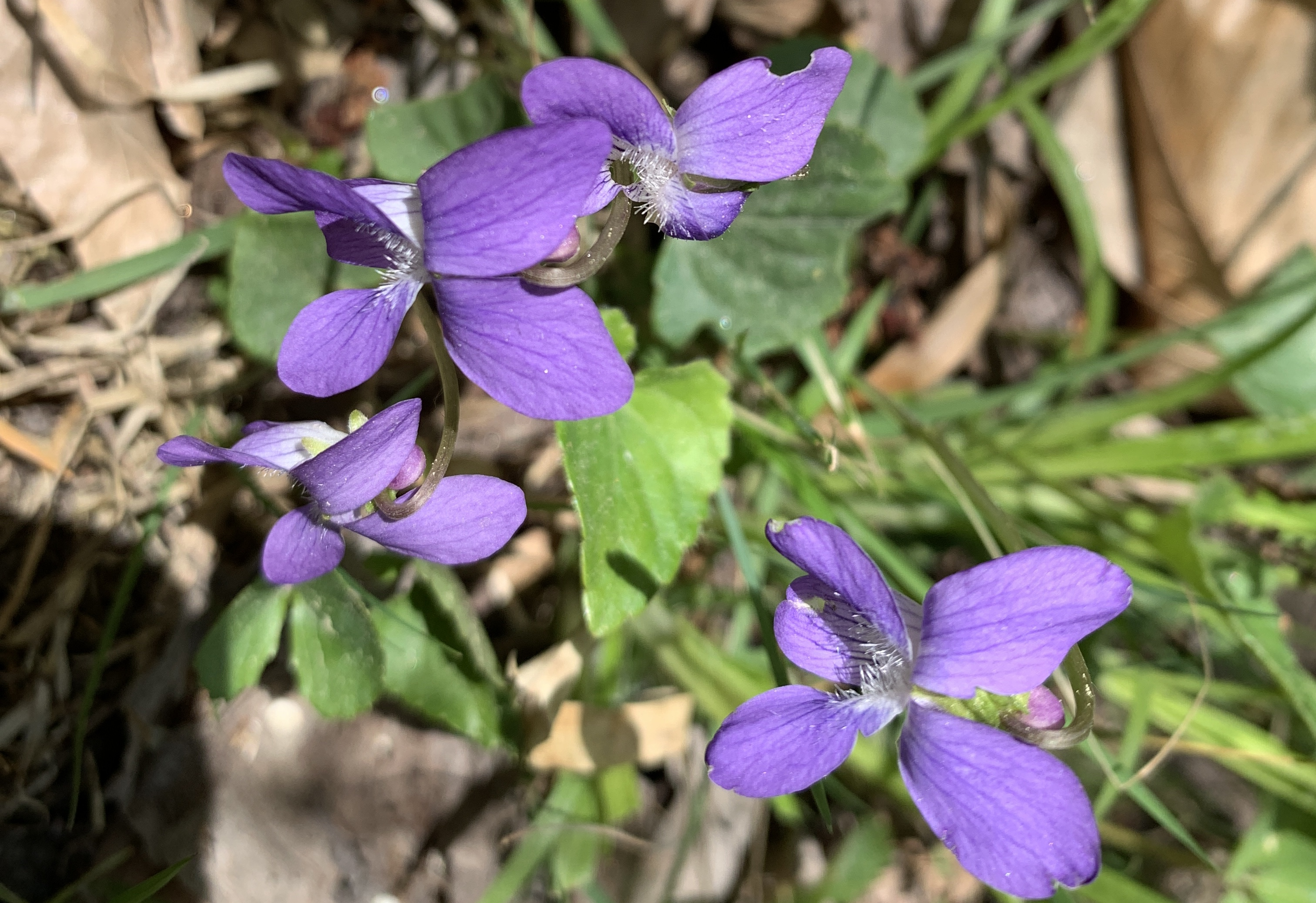
Viola L. — Violet

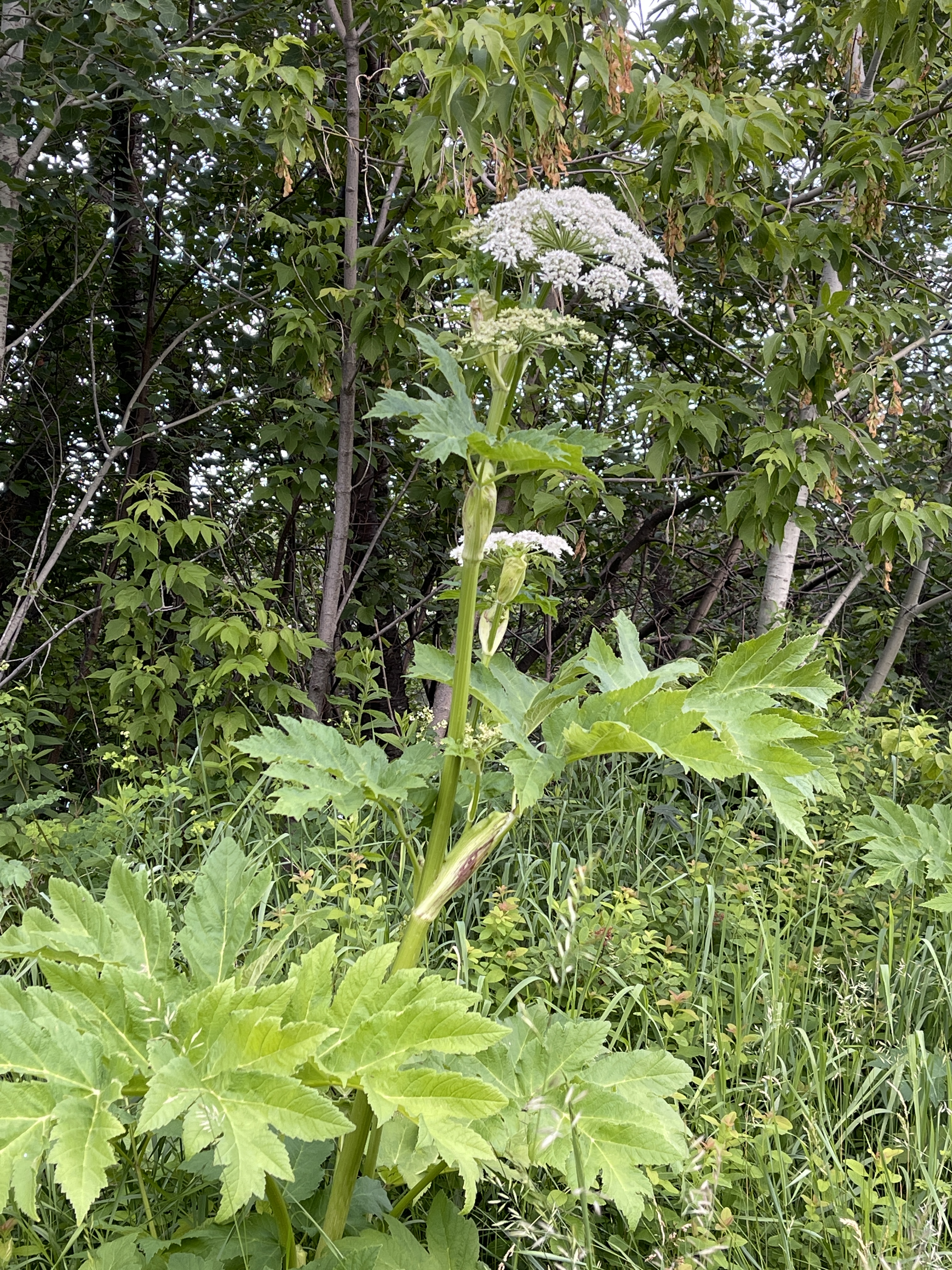
Heracleum maximum Bart. — Cow parsnip

== Batiscan River ==
Upstream to downstream

- Forest sectors
Notre-Dame-de-Montauban - Sainte-Geneviève-de-Batiscan

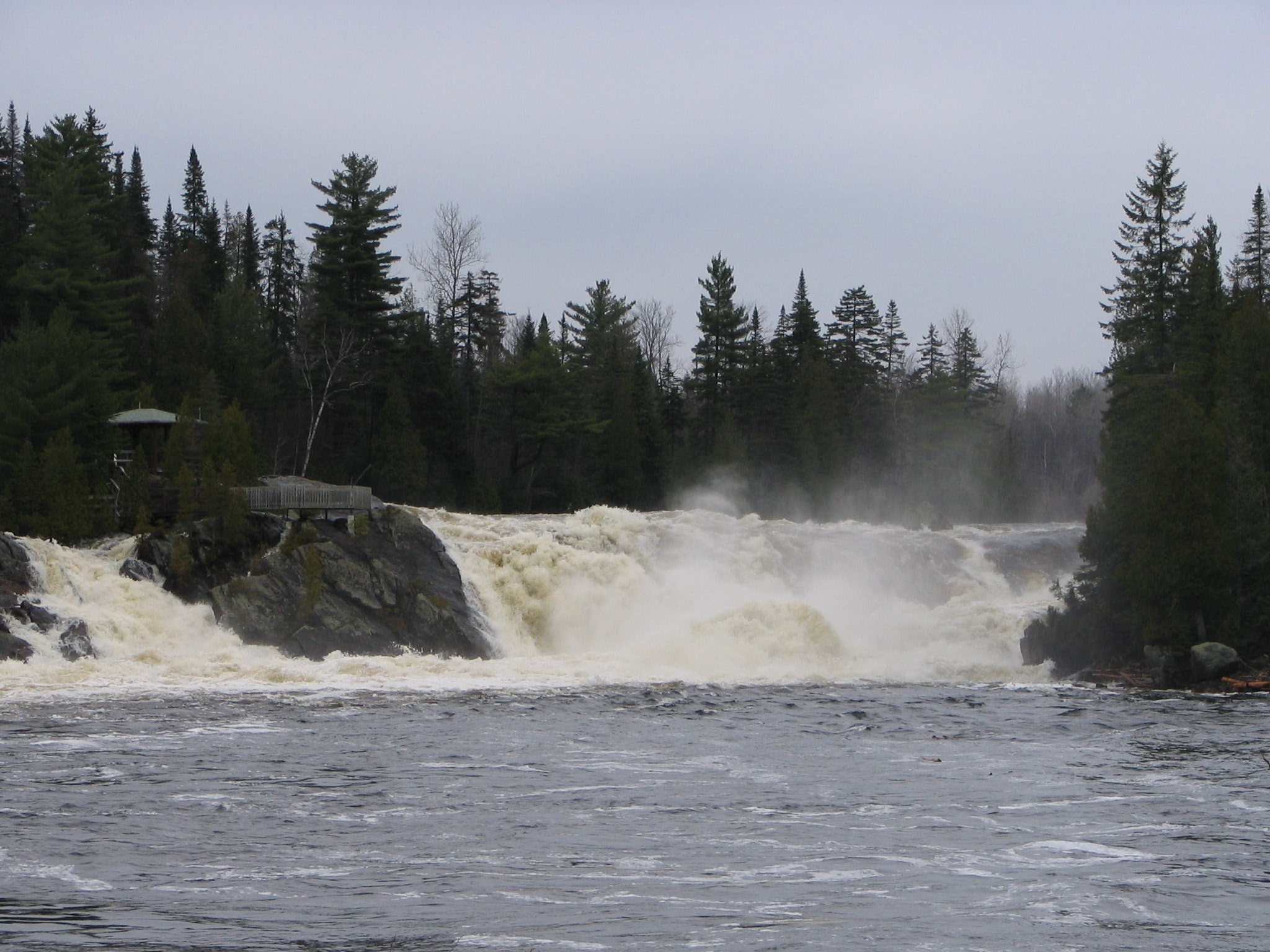
Chutes-de-Montauban Parc

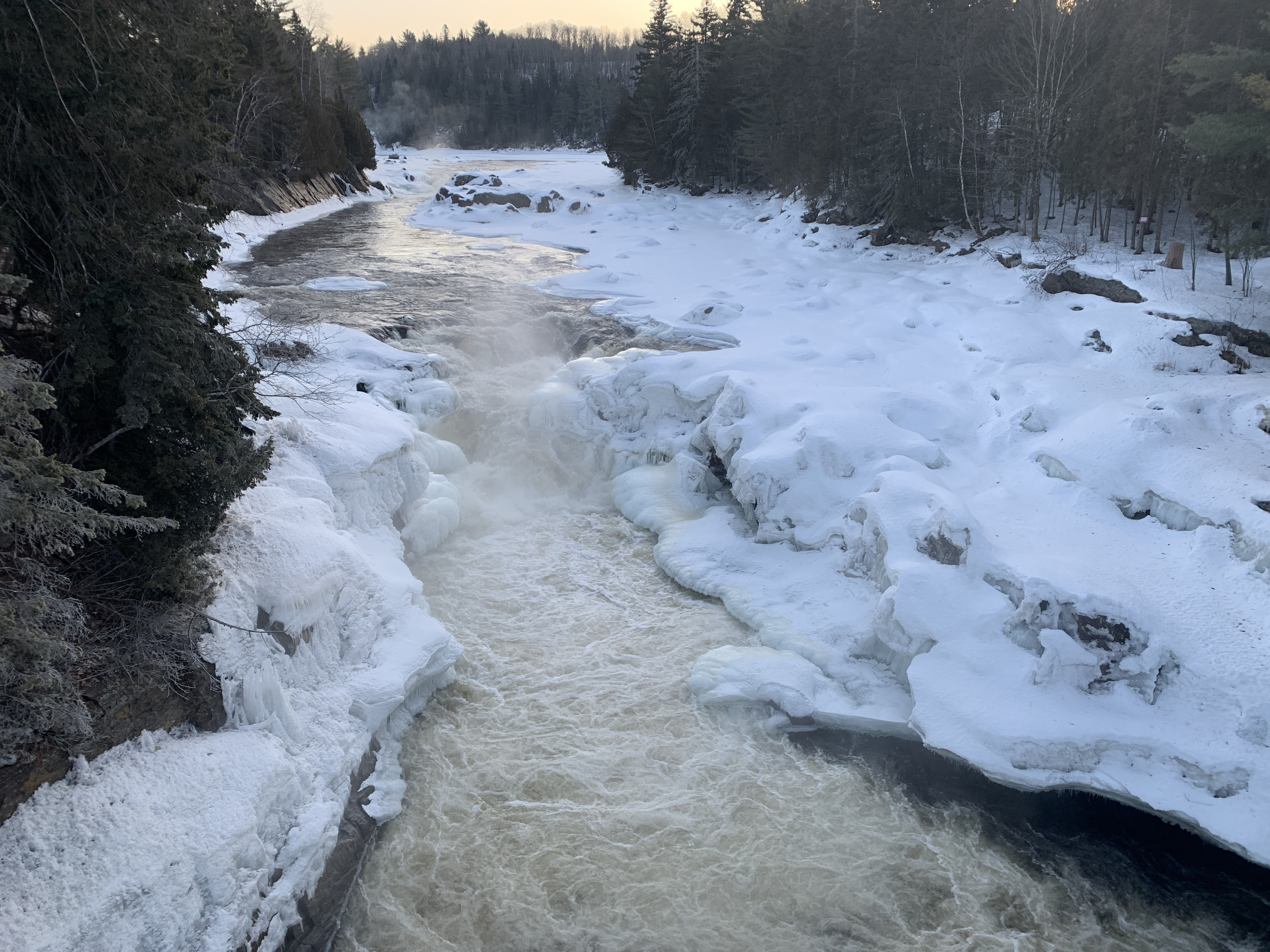
Spring flood

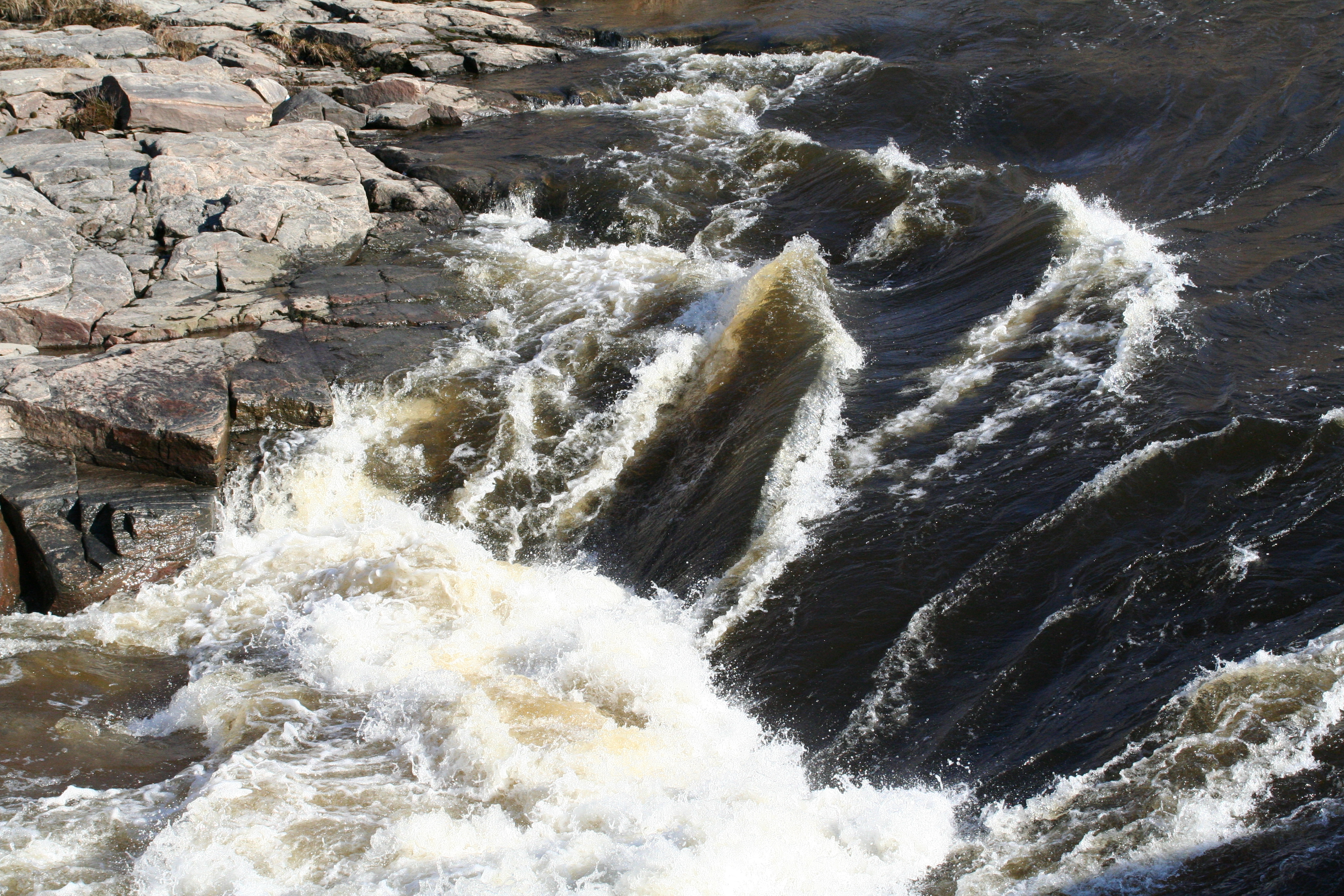
Batiscan River Park, West Bank Trail

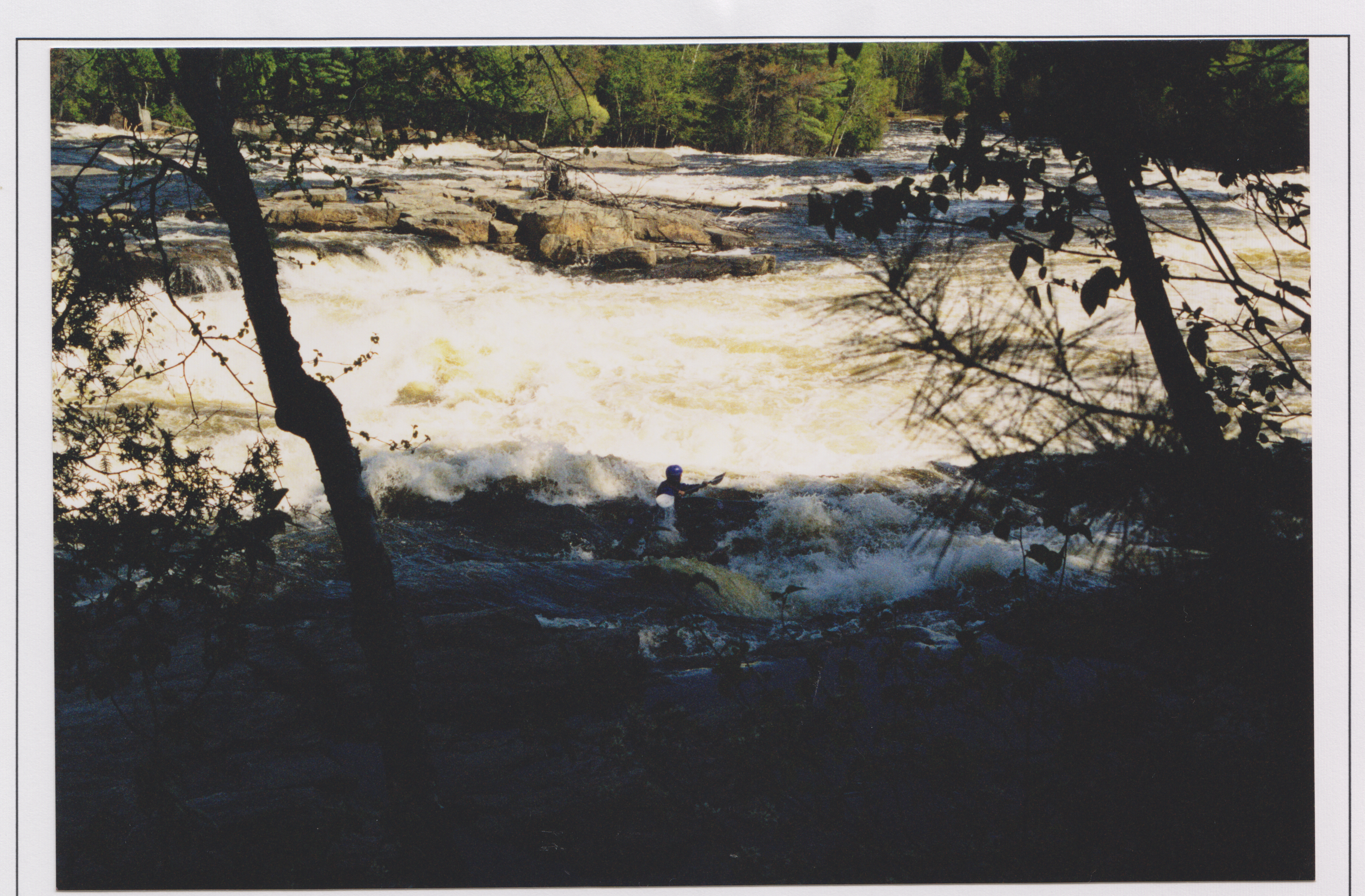
Kayaker, Batiscan River Park, West Bank Trail

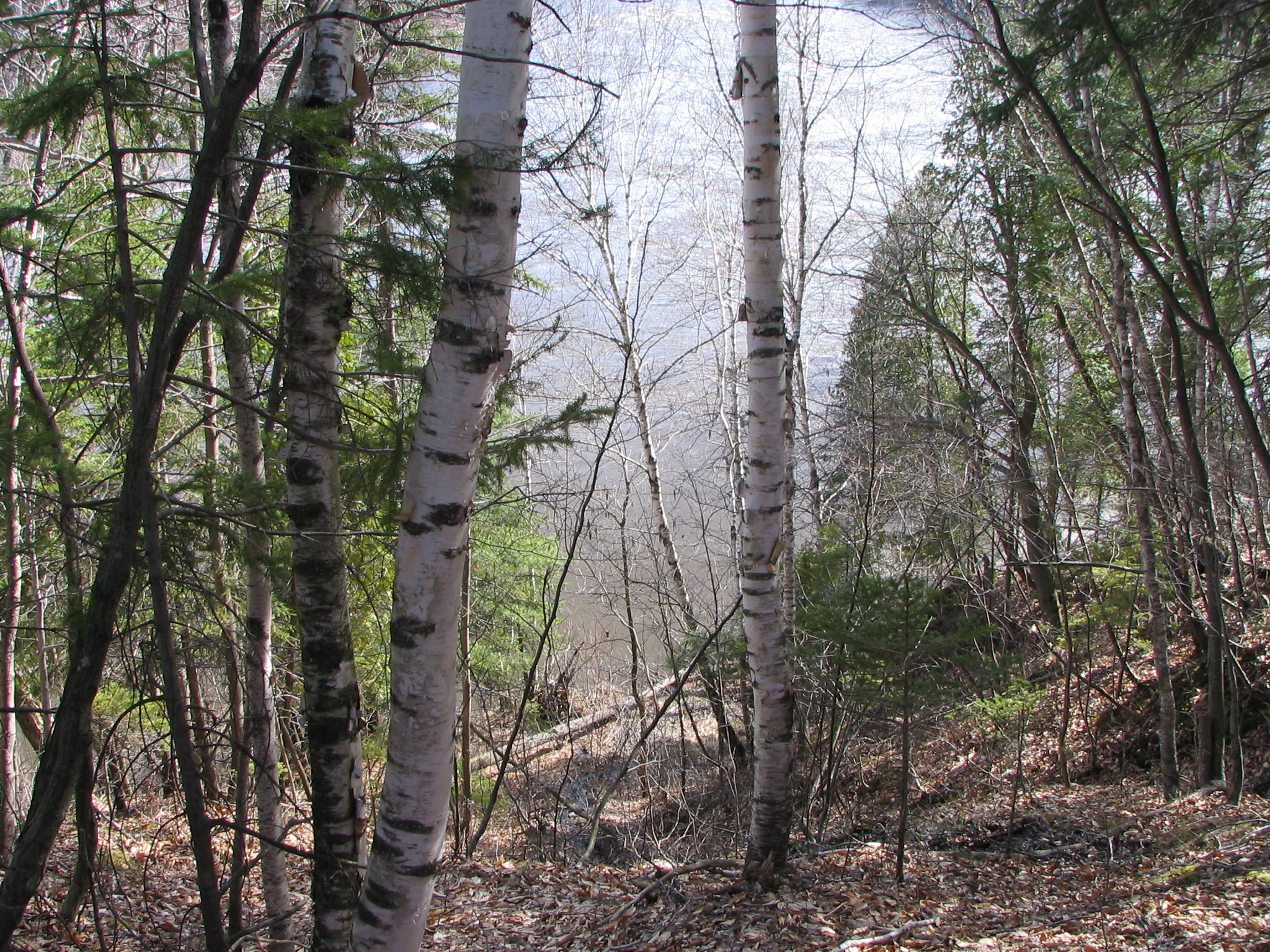
Batiscan River Park, Grand-Basin sector

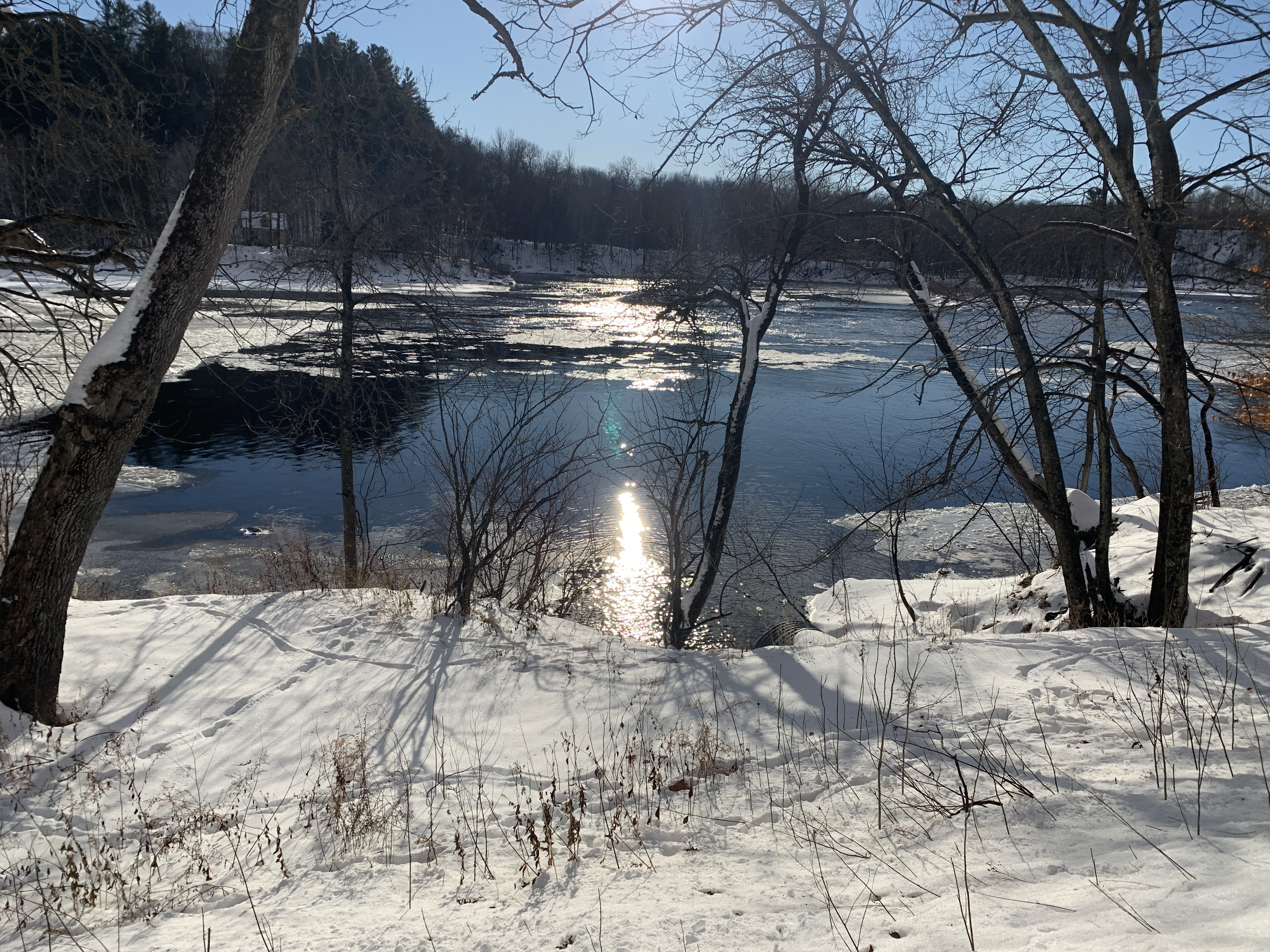
Sainte-Geneviève-de-Batiscan

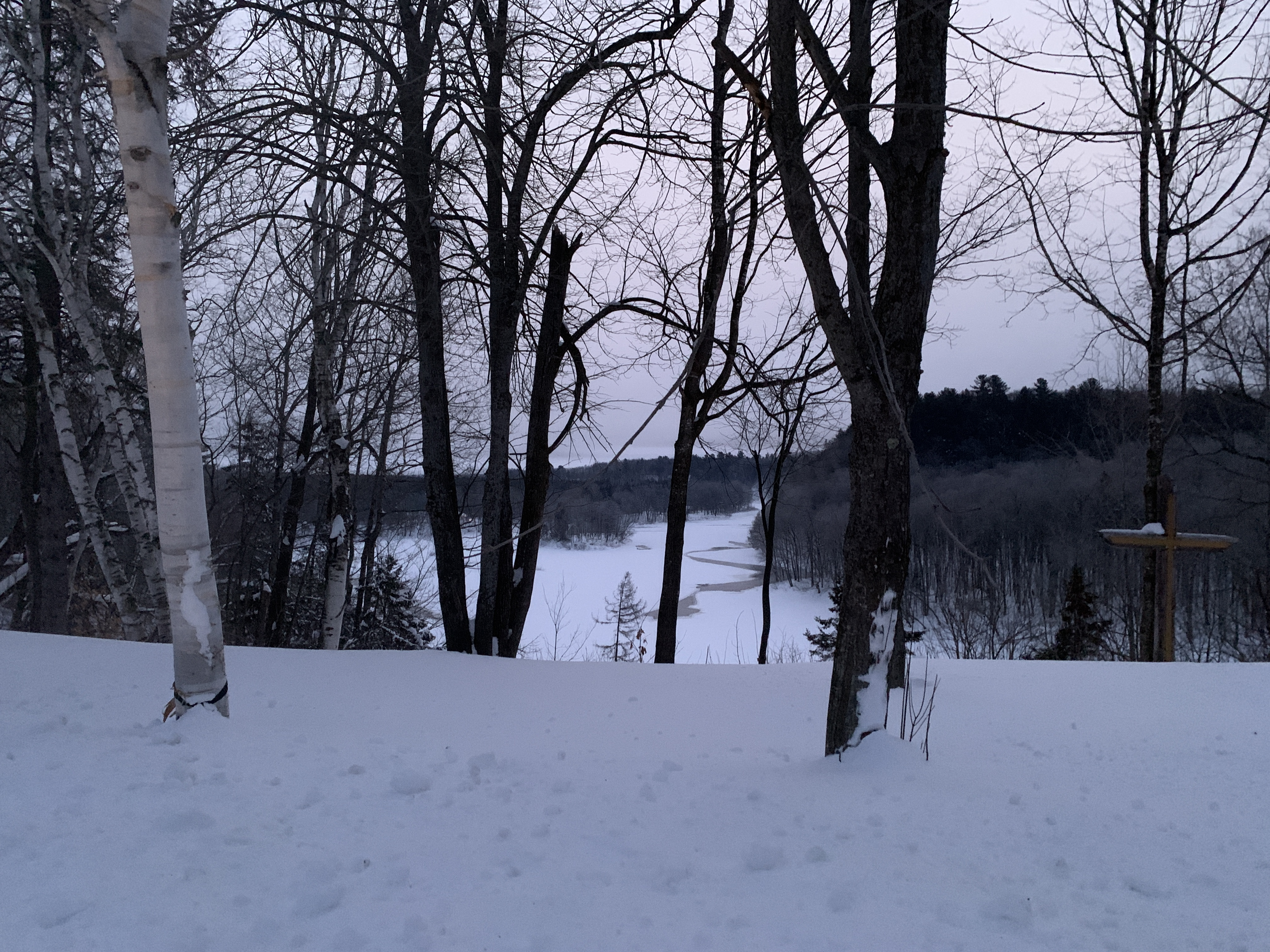
Sainte-Geneviève-de-Batiscan, winter open water net

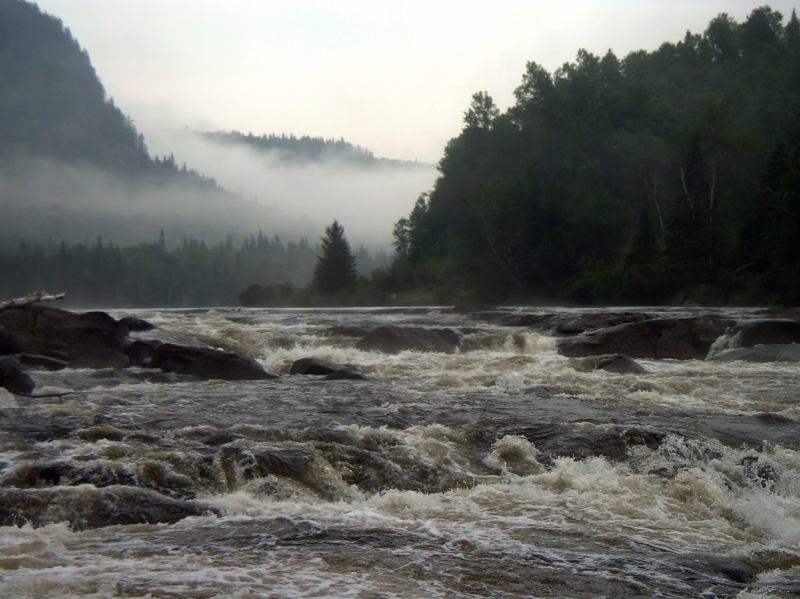
River rapids
- Rural & agricultural zones
Saint-Stanislas - Sainte-Genevieve-de-Batiscan

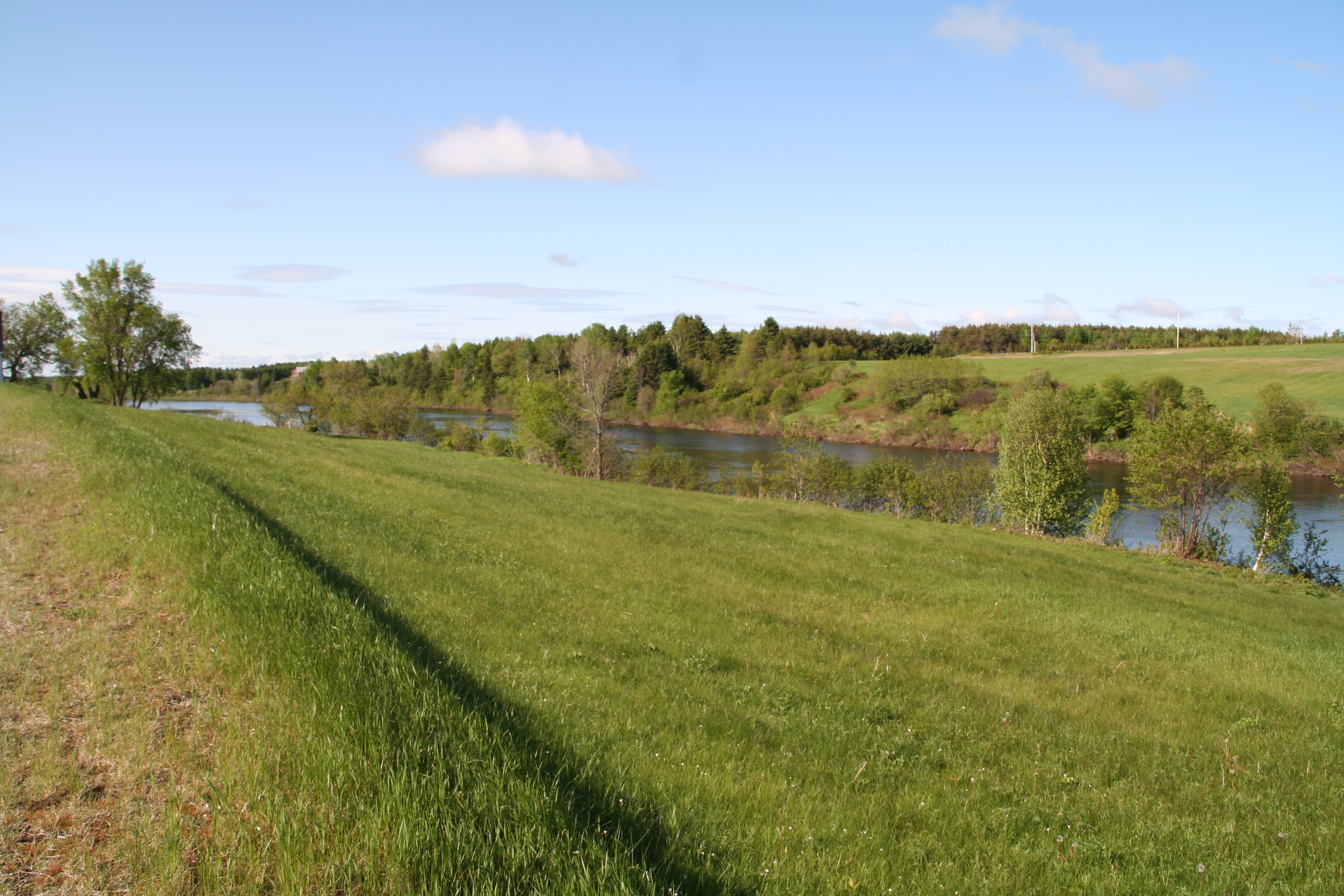
Saint-Stanislas, rang de la Rivière Batiscan NE

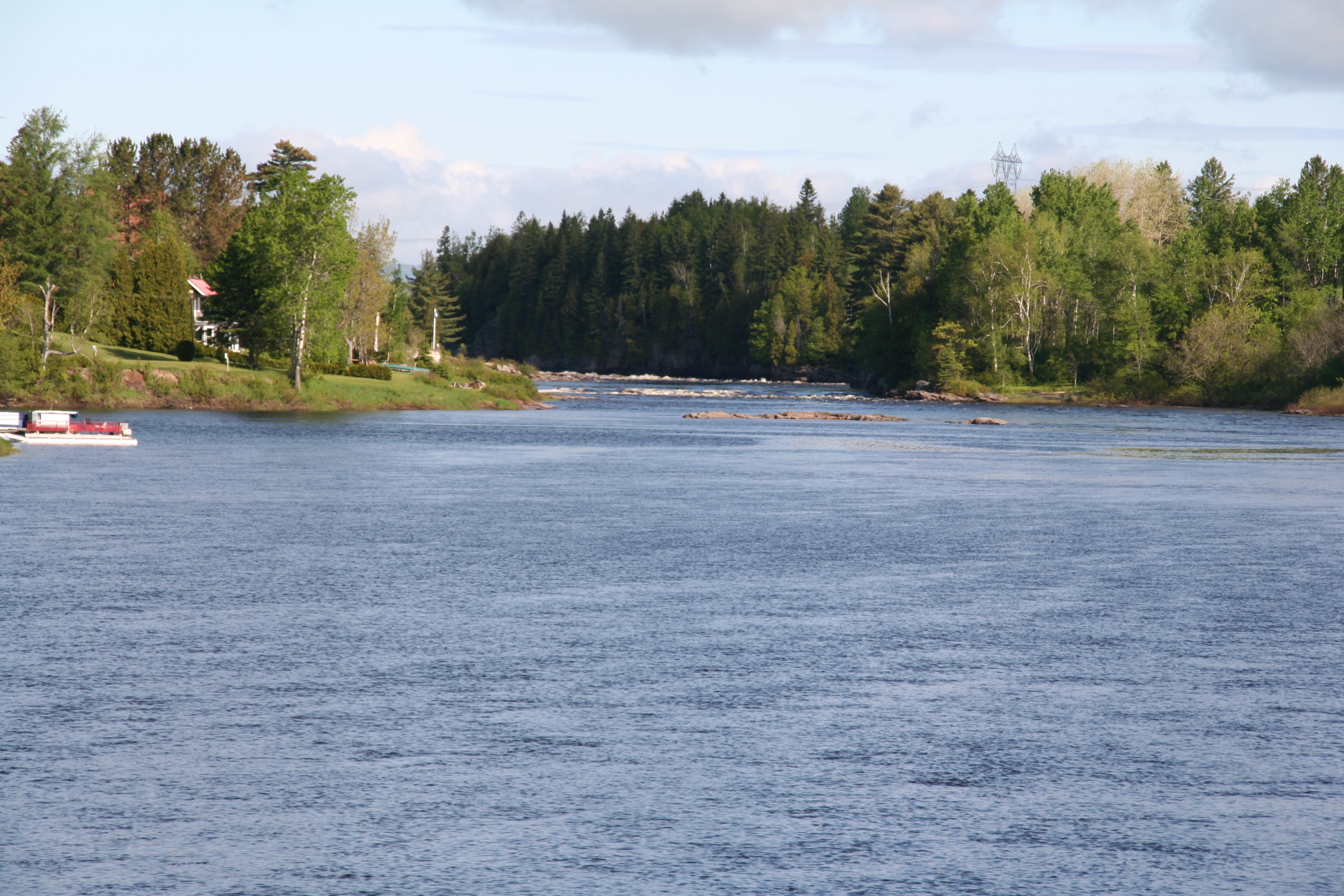
Saint-Stanislas, rang de la Rivière Batiscan NE

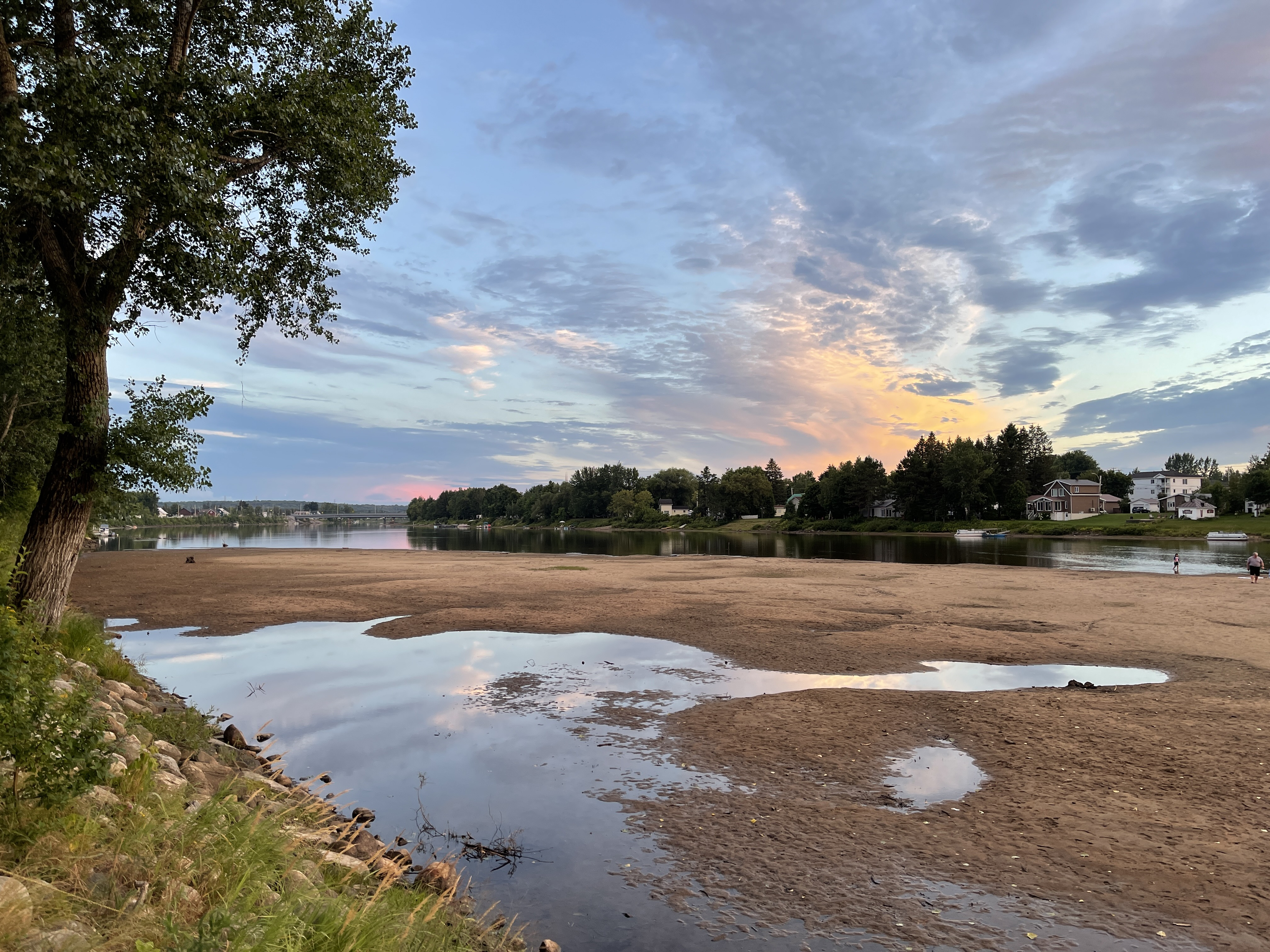
St-Stanislas, rang de la Rivière Batiscan NE

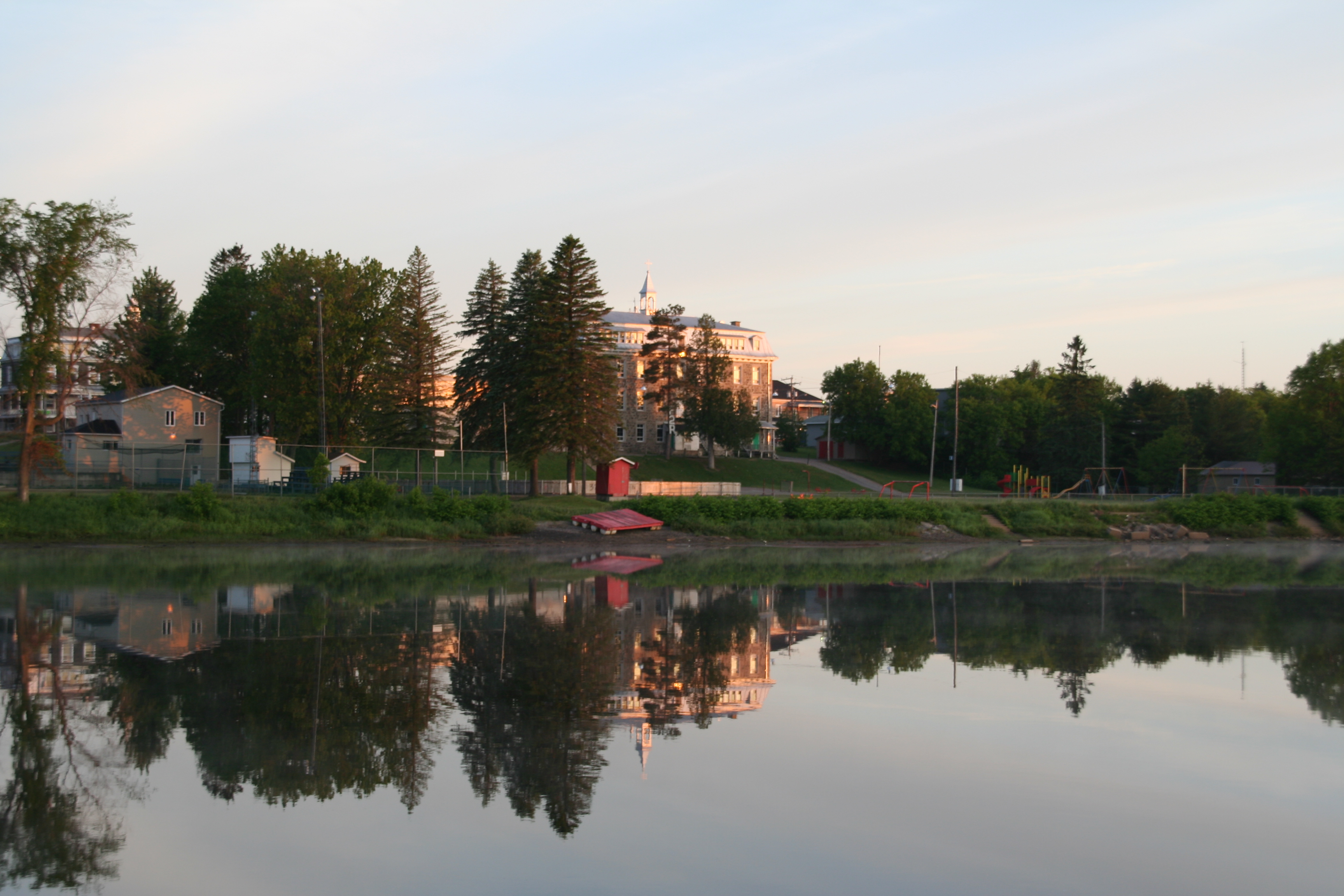
Saint-Stanislas, la rivière, du rang de la Rivière-Batiscan NE

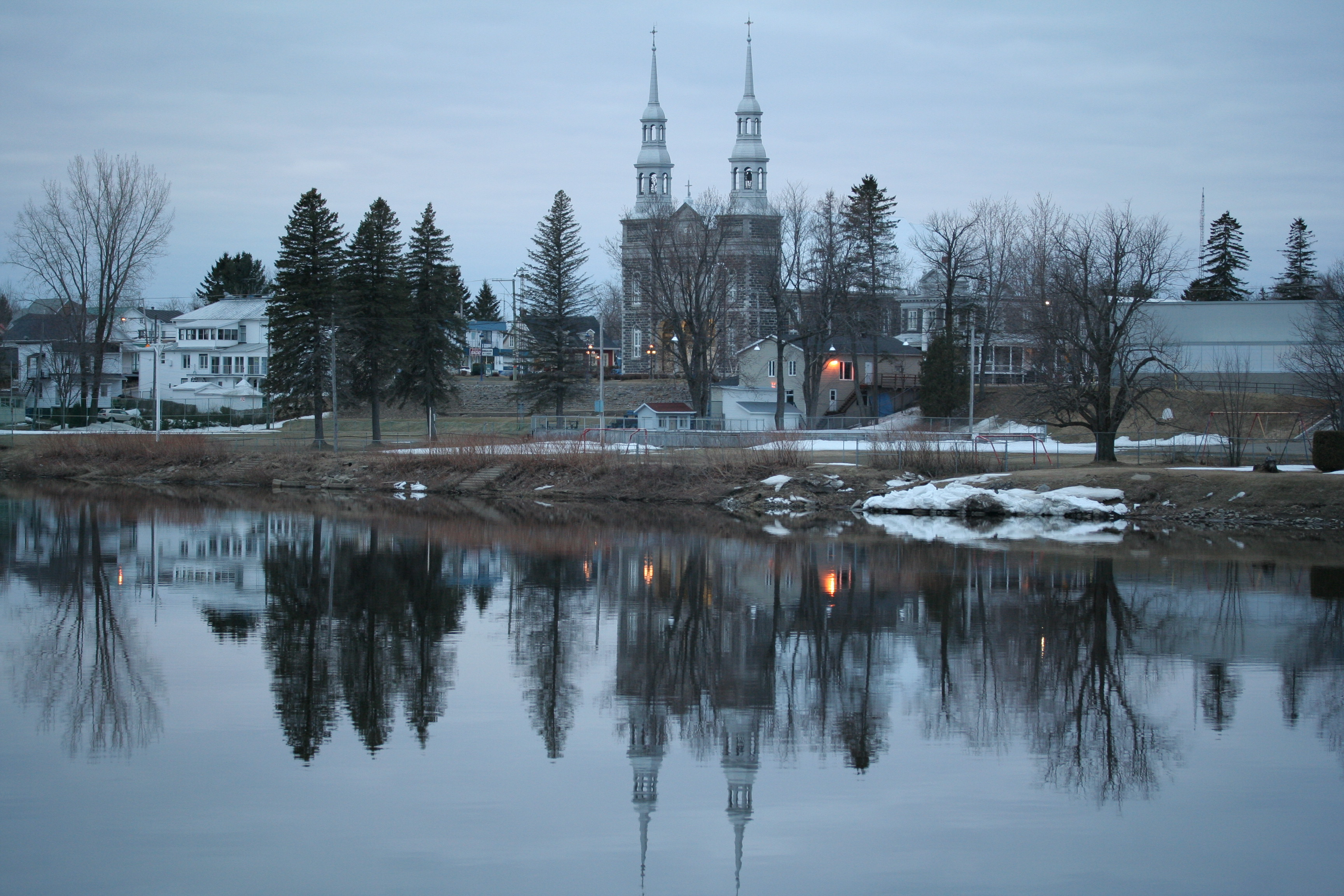
Saint-Stanislas, rang de la Rivière Batiscan NE

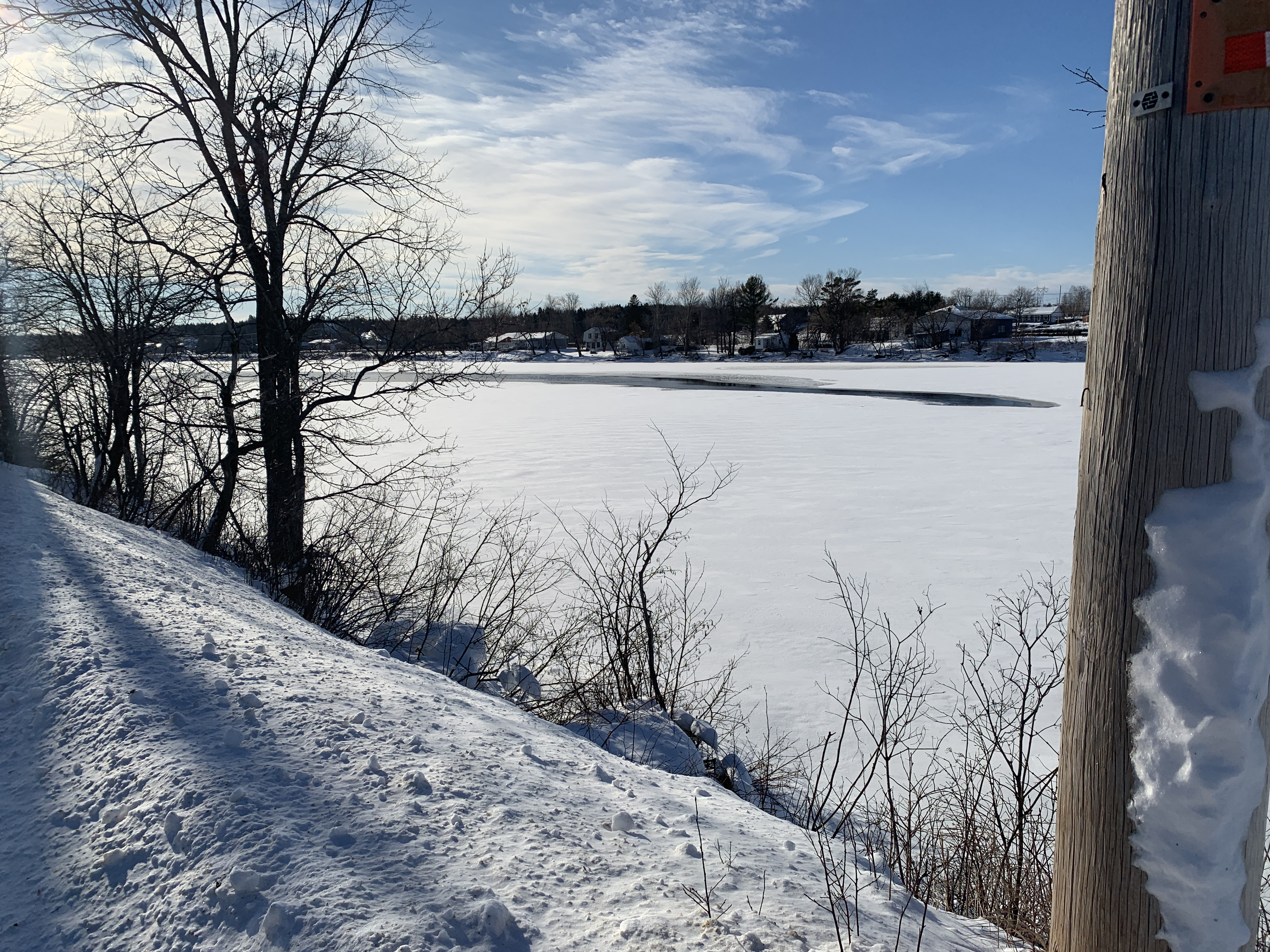
Saint-Stanislas, rang de la Rivière Batiscan NE,

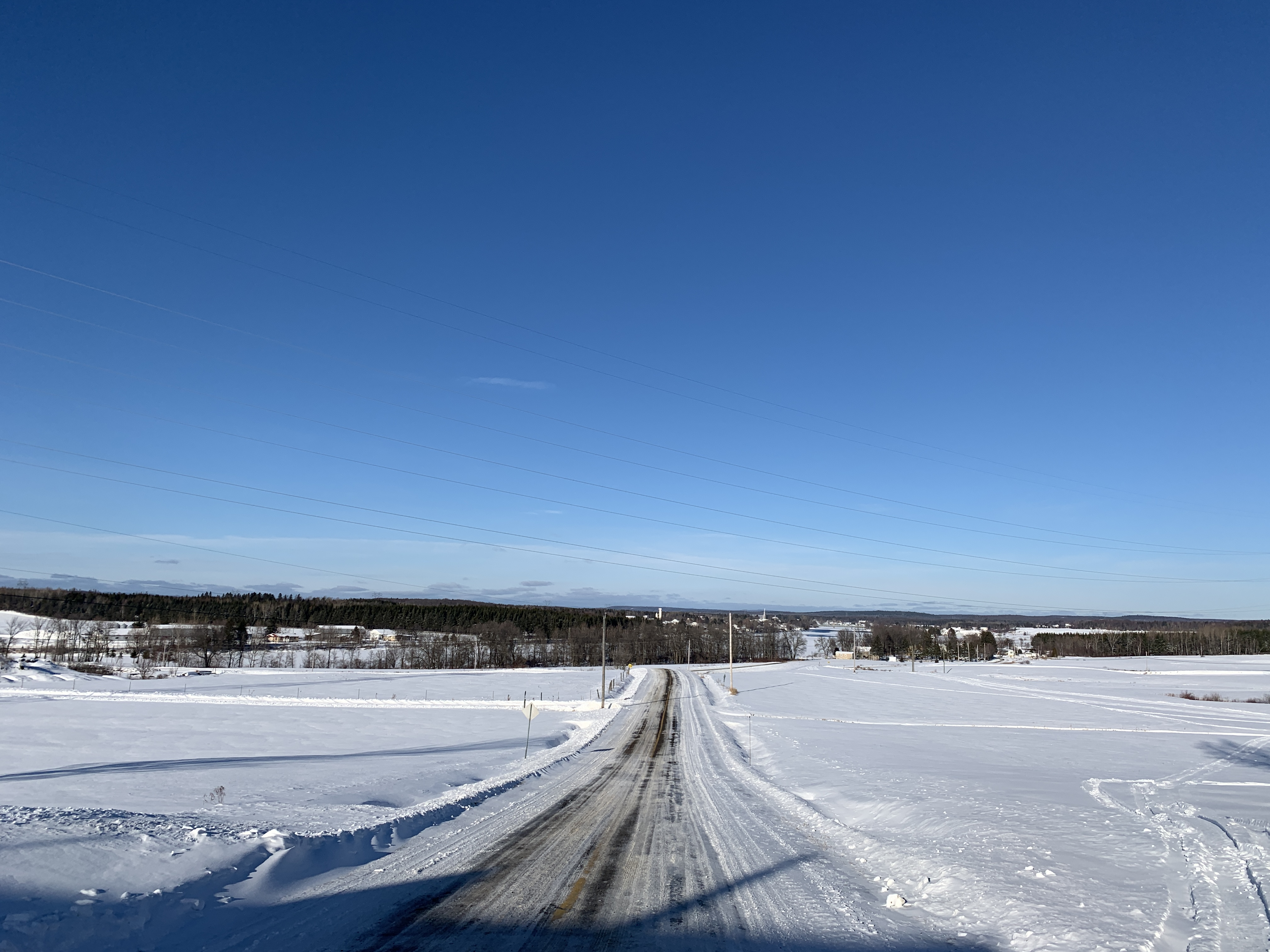
Saint-Stanislas, rang de la Rivière Batiscan NE

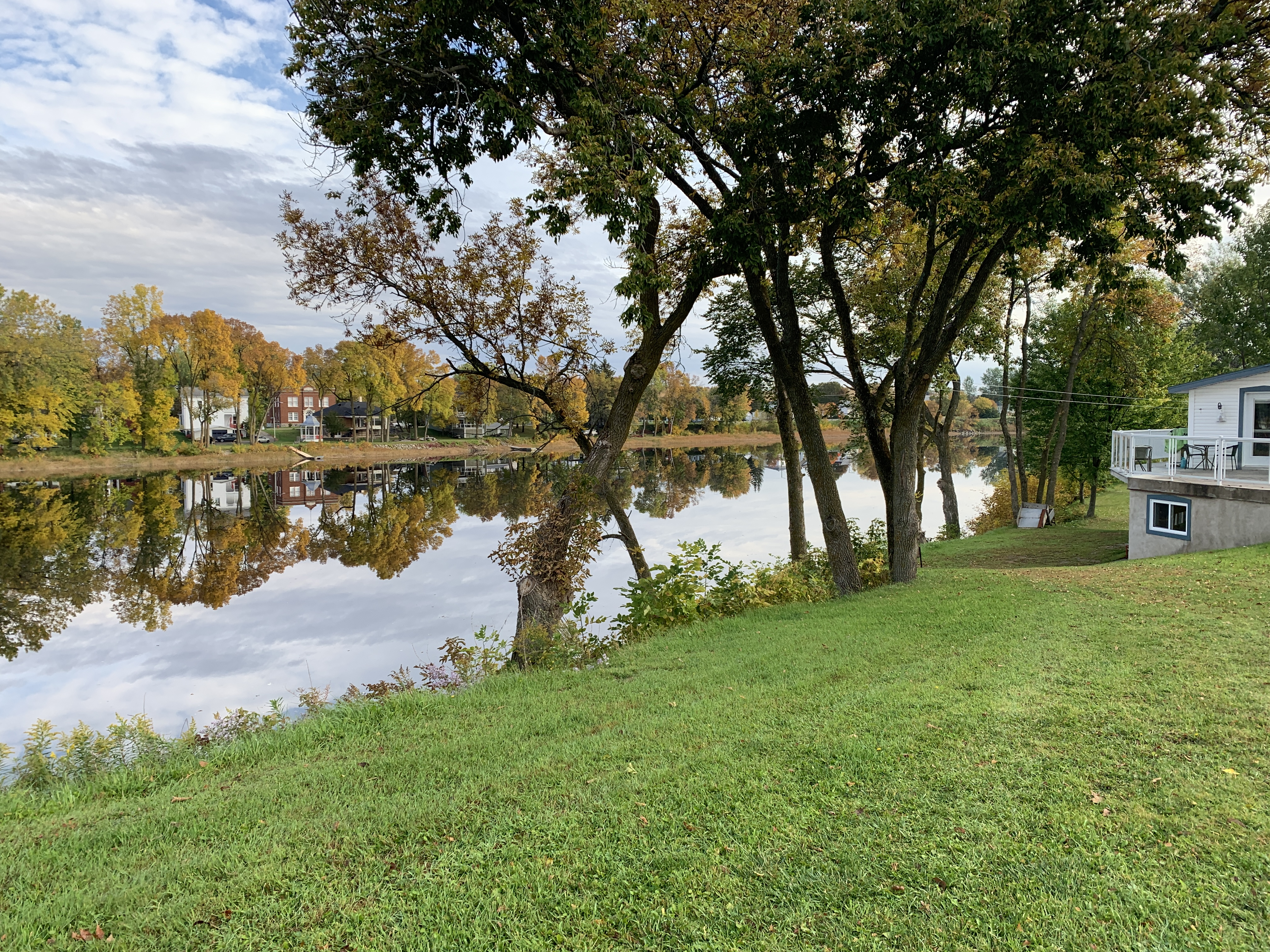
Ste-Geneviève-de-Batiscan, rang Sud

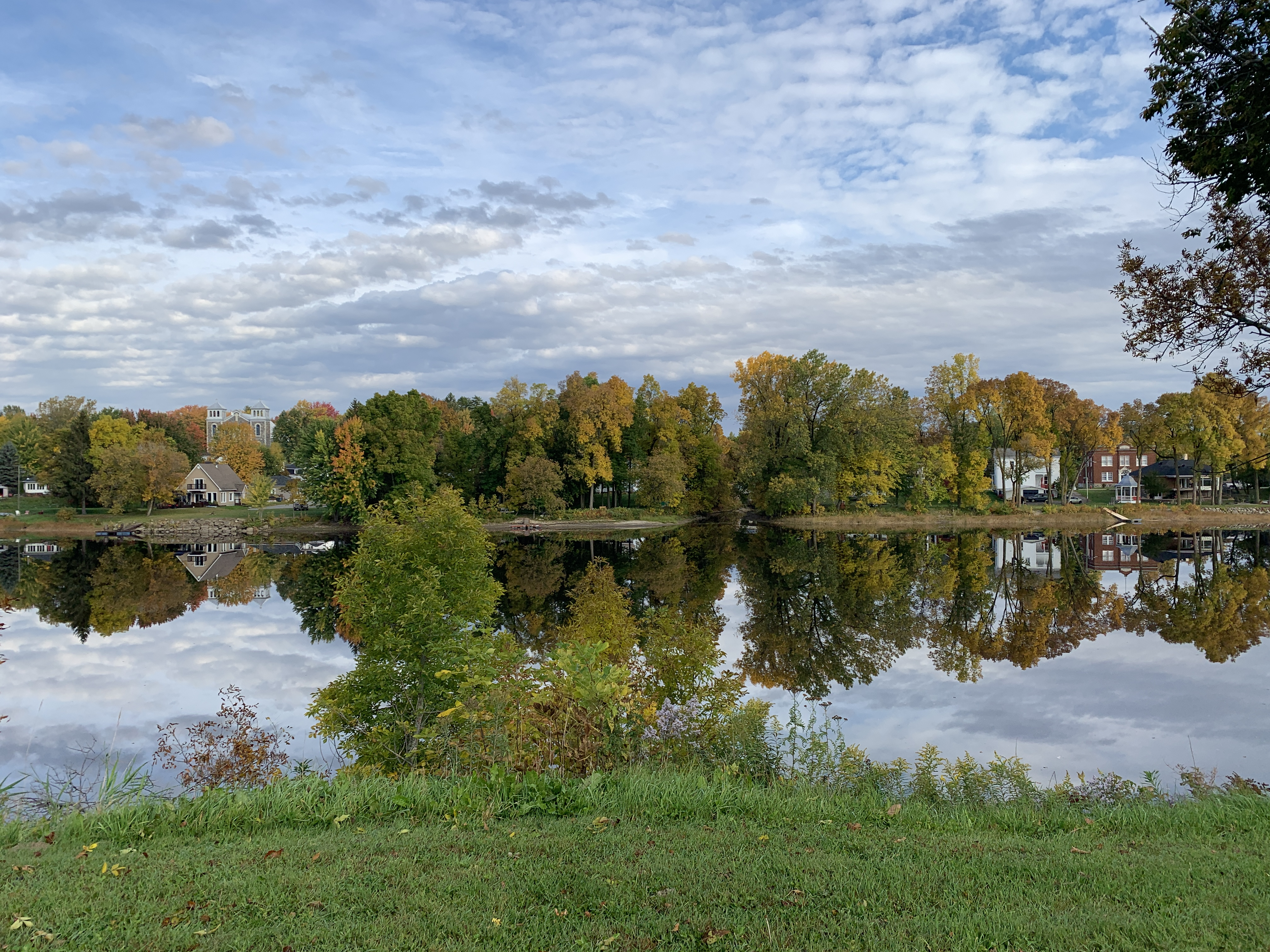
Sainte-Geneviève-de-Batiscan, rang Sud (route 361)

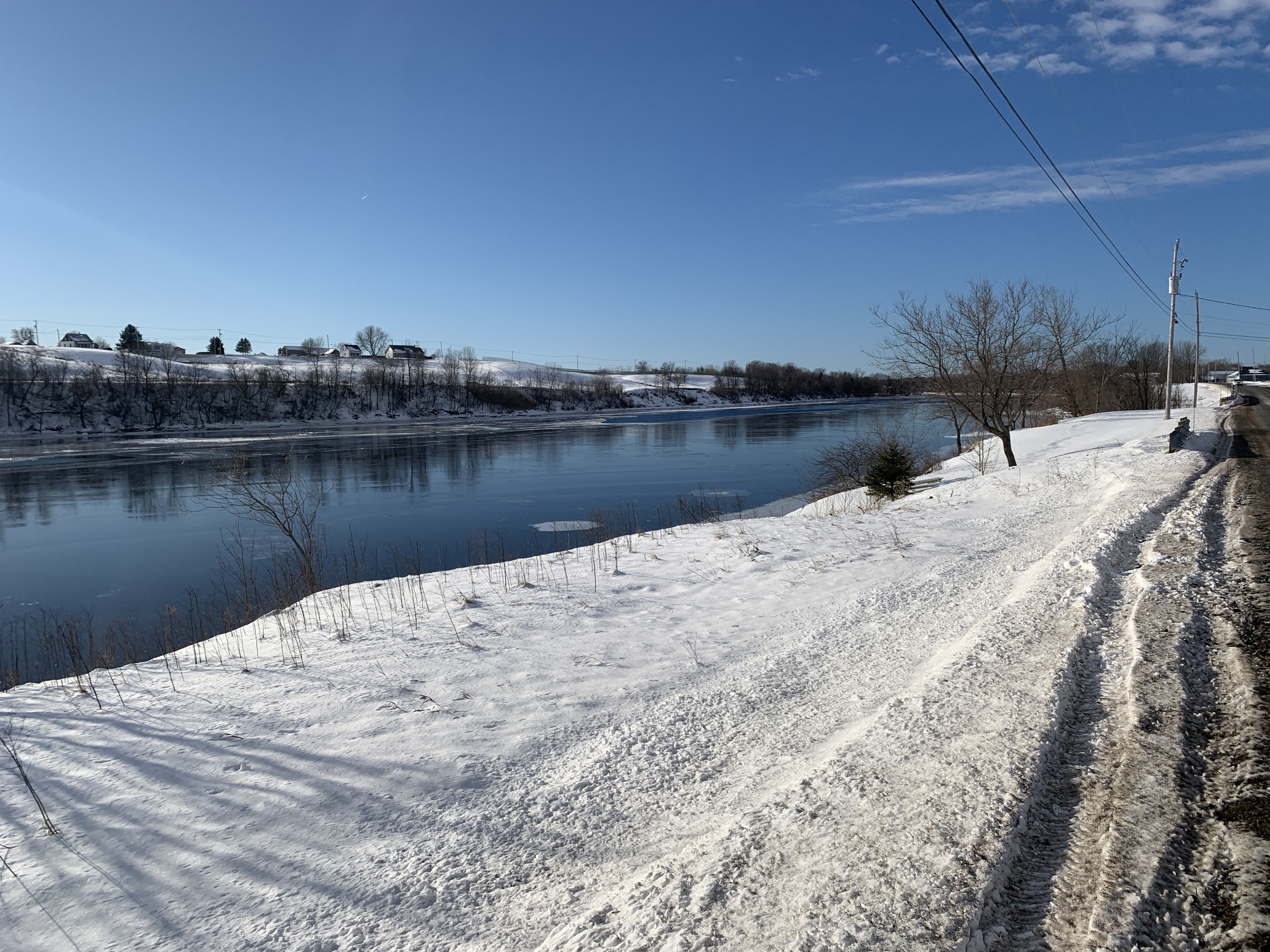
Sainte-Geneviève-de-Batiscan, rang Nord
- Mouth, in Batiscan
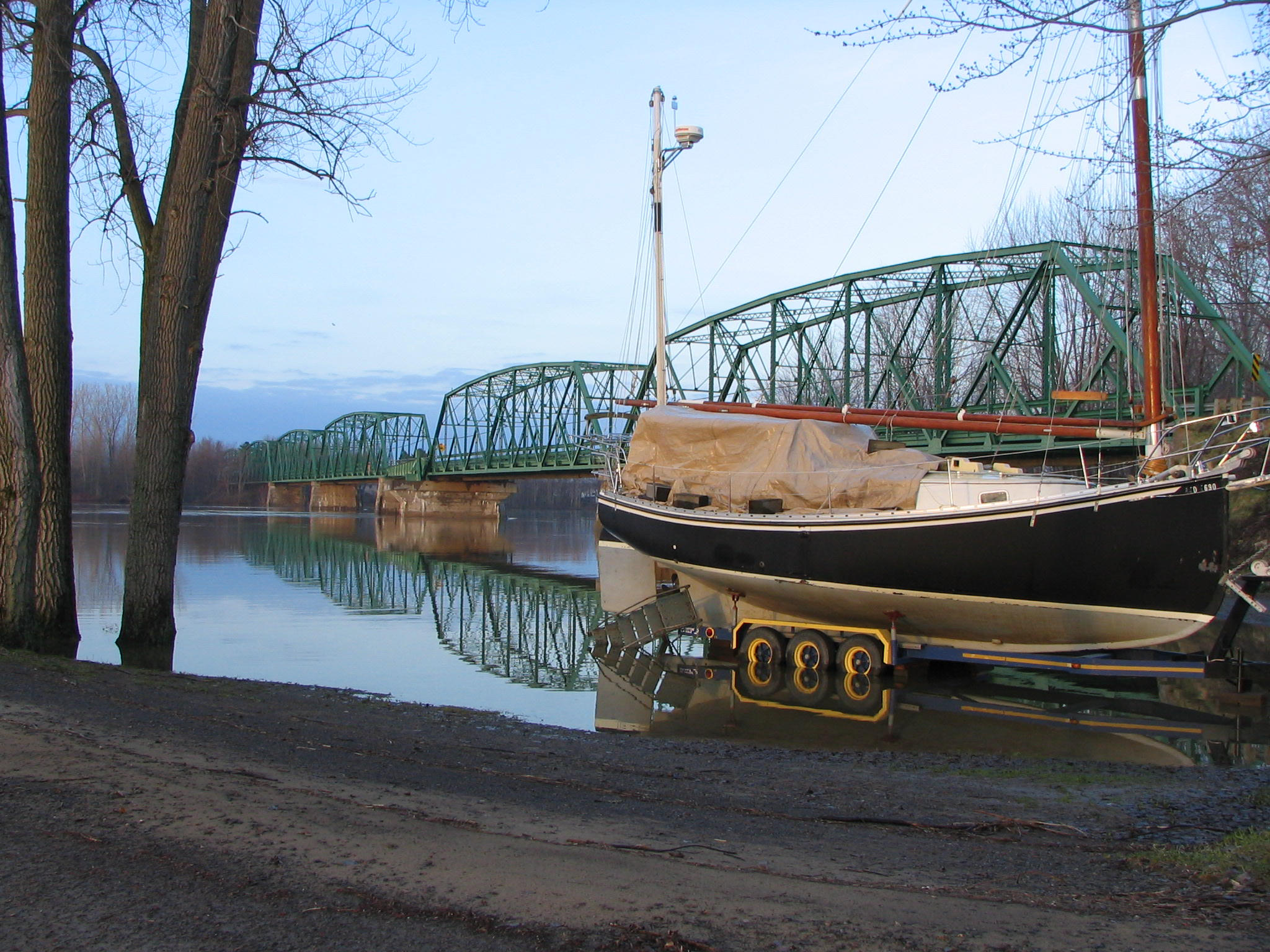
Old iron bridge, Chemin du Roy (Route 138)

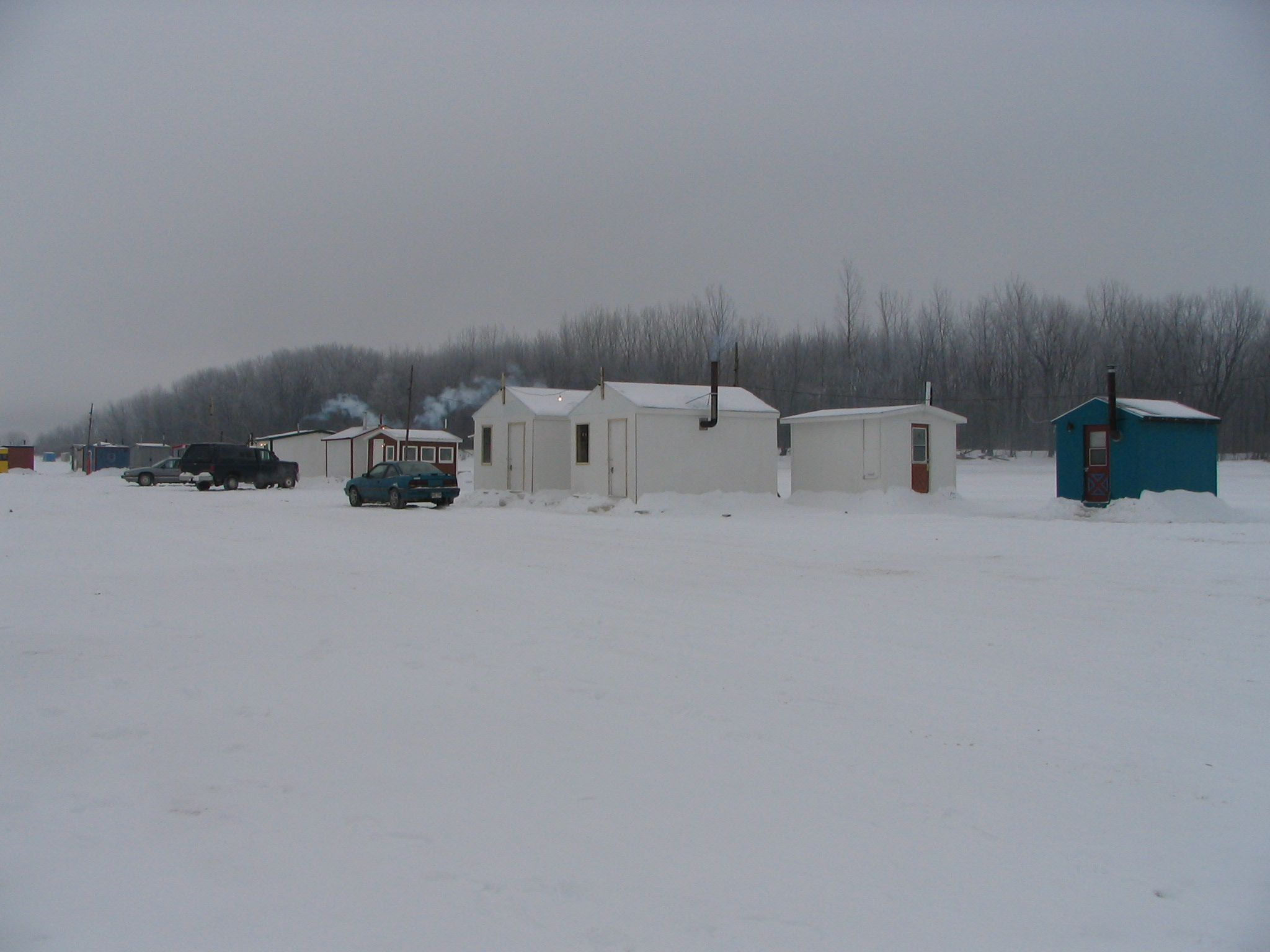
Ice fishing huts

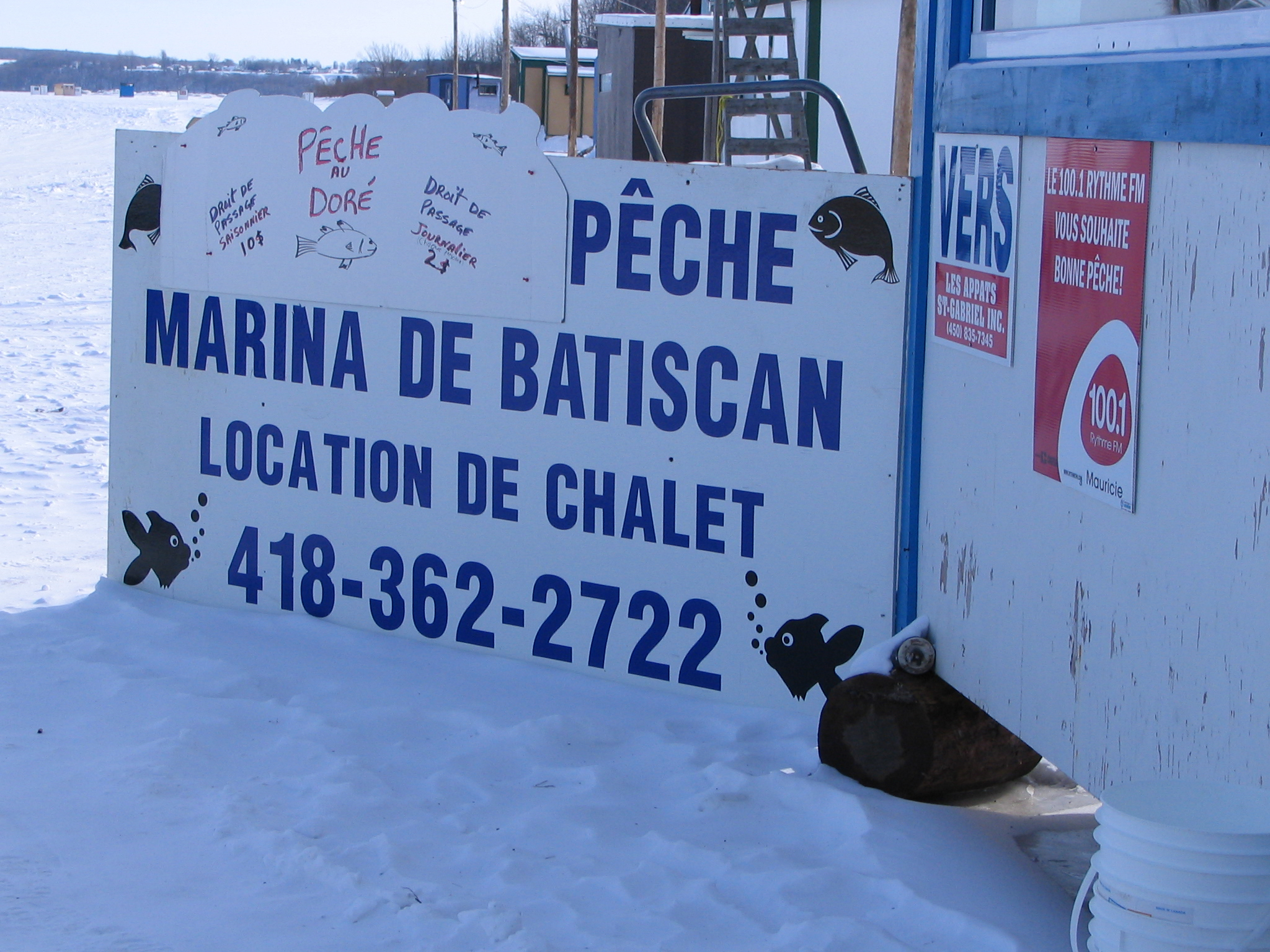
Sign on the river ice path, access from the Marina

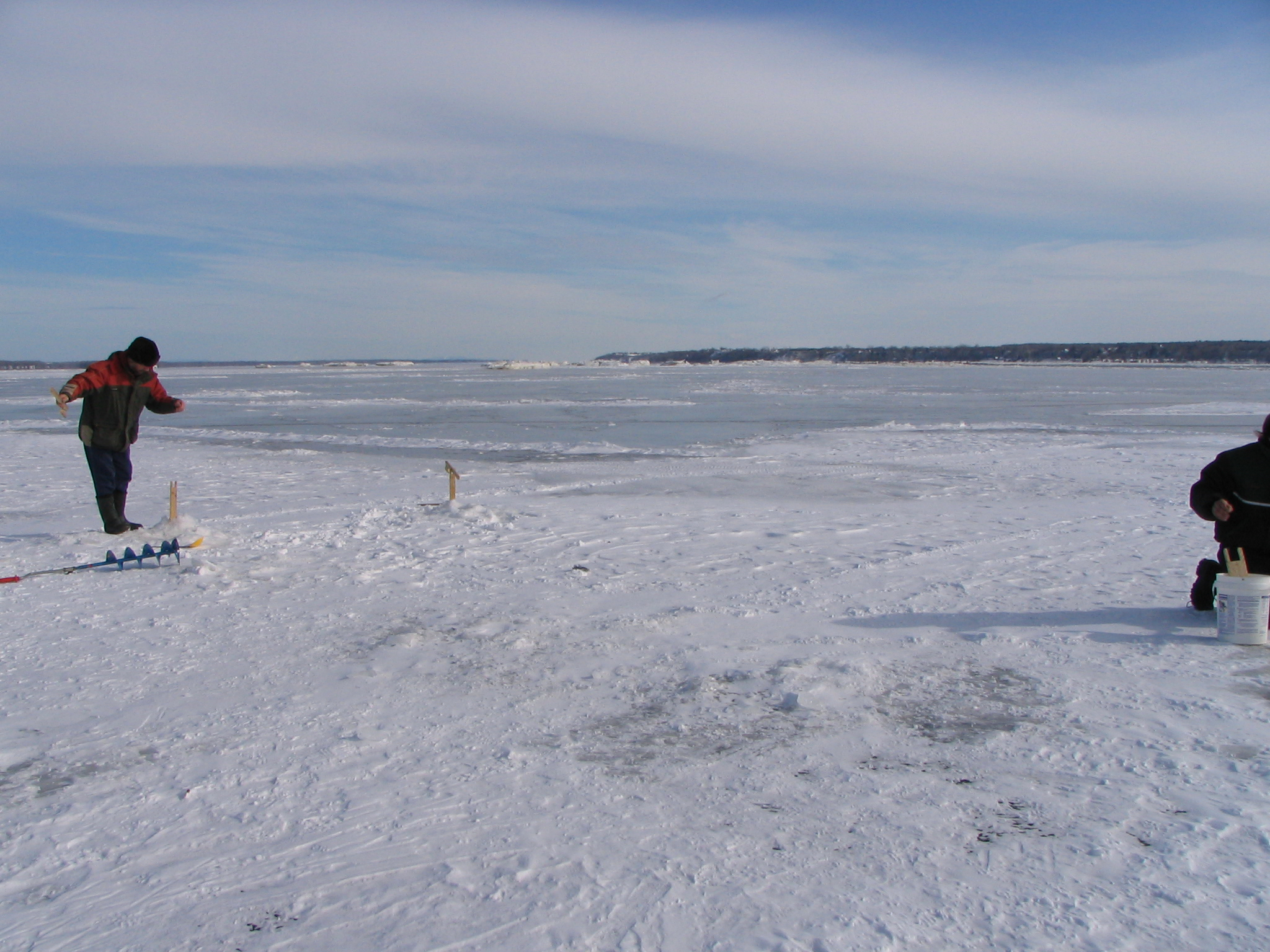
Fishermen, brimbals, on the river ice

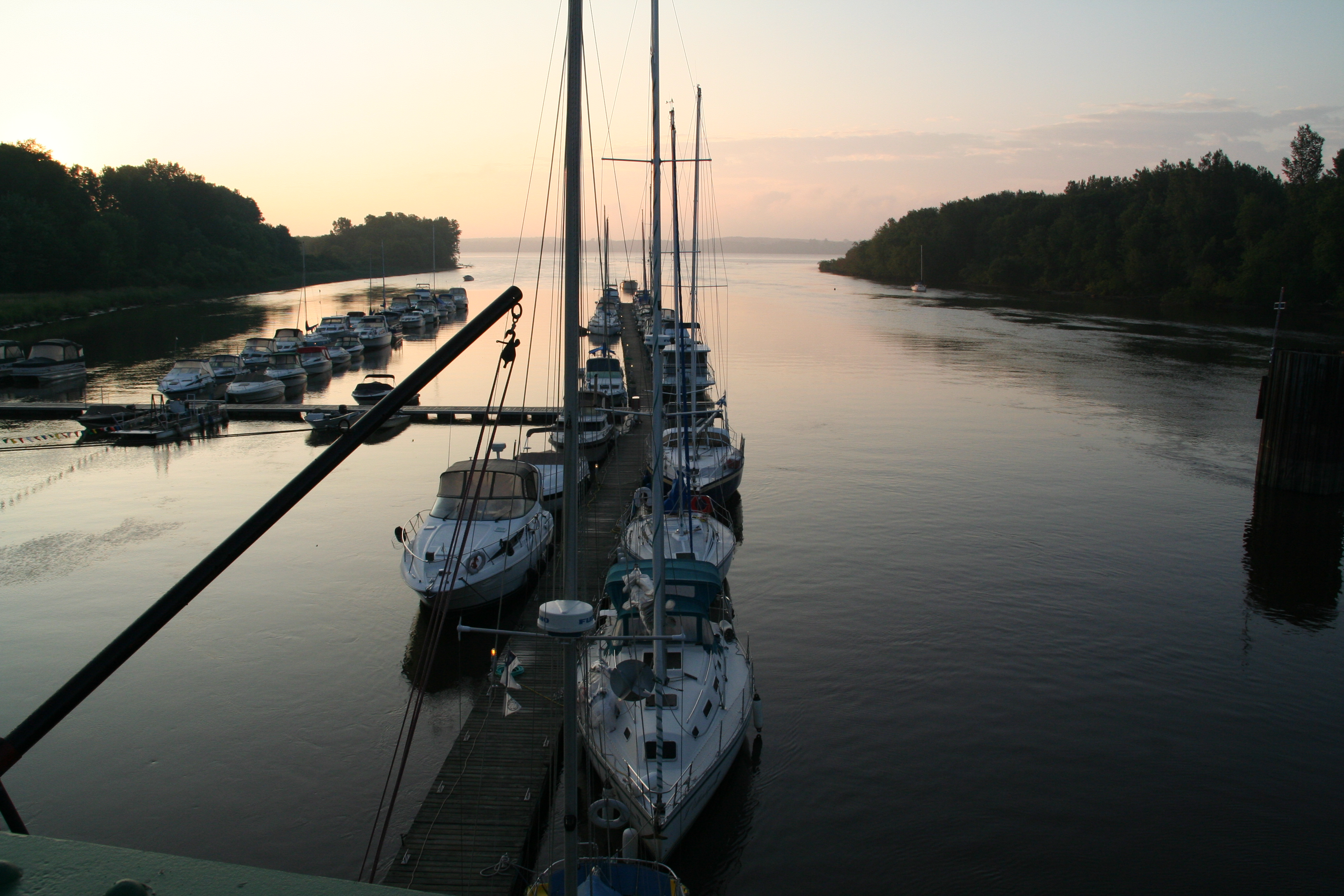
Boats at the docks of the marina, from the bridge on the Chemin du Roy

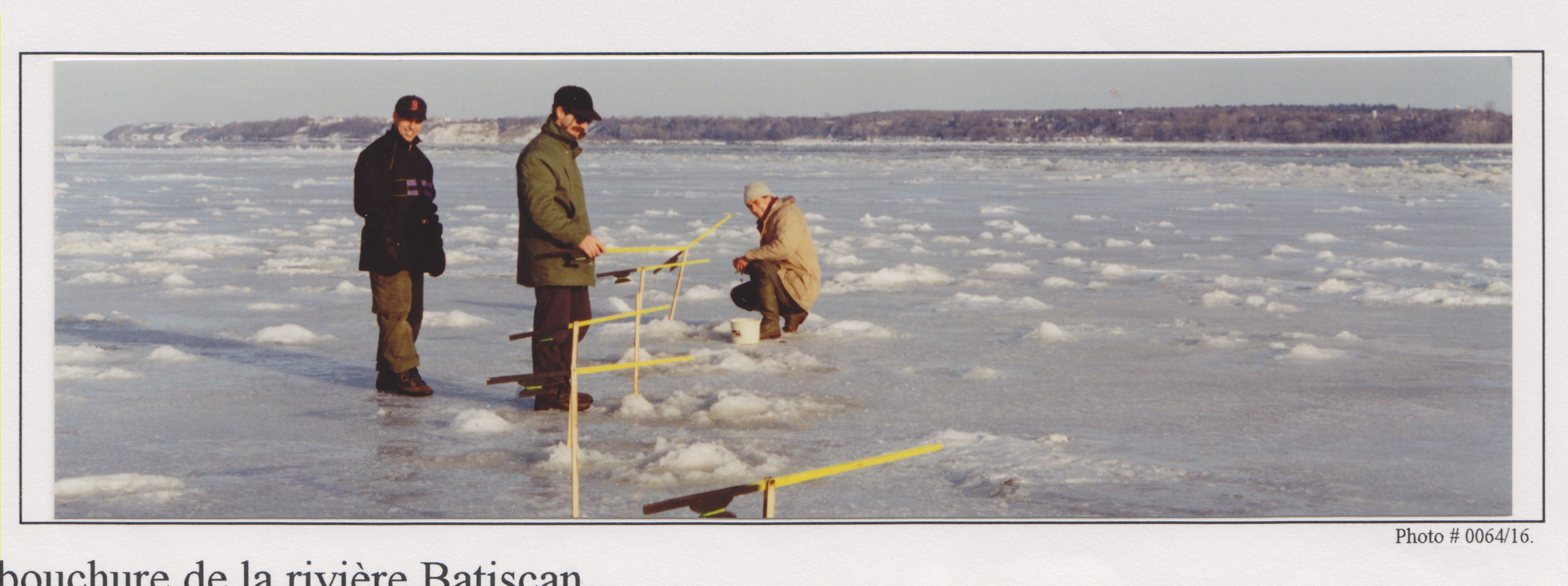
Fishermen offshore, on the ice of the estuarian section of the St. Lawrence River and the mouth of the Batiscan River
- Structures
Bridges, footbridge, built

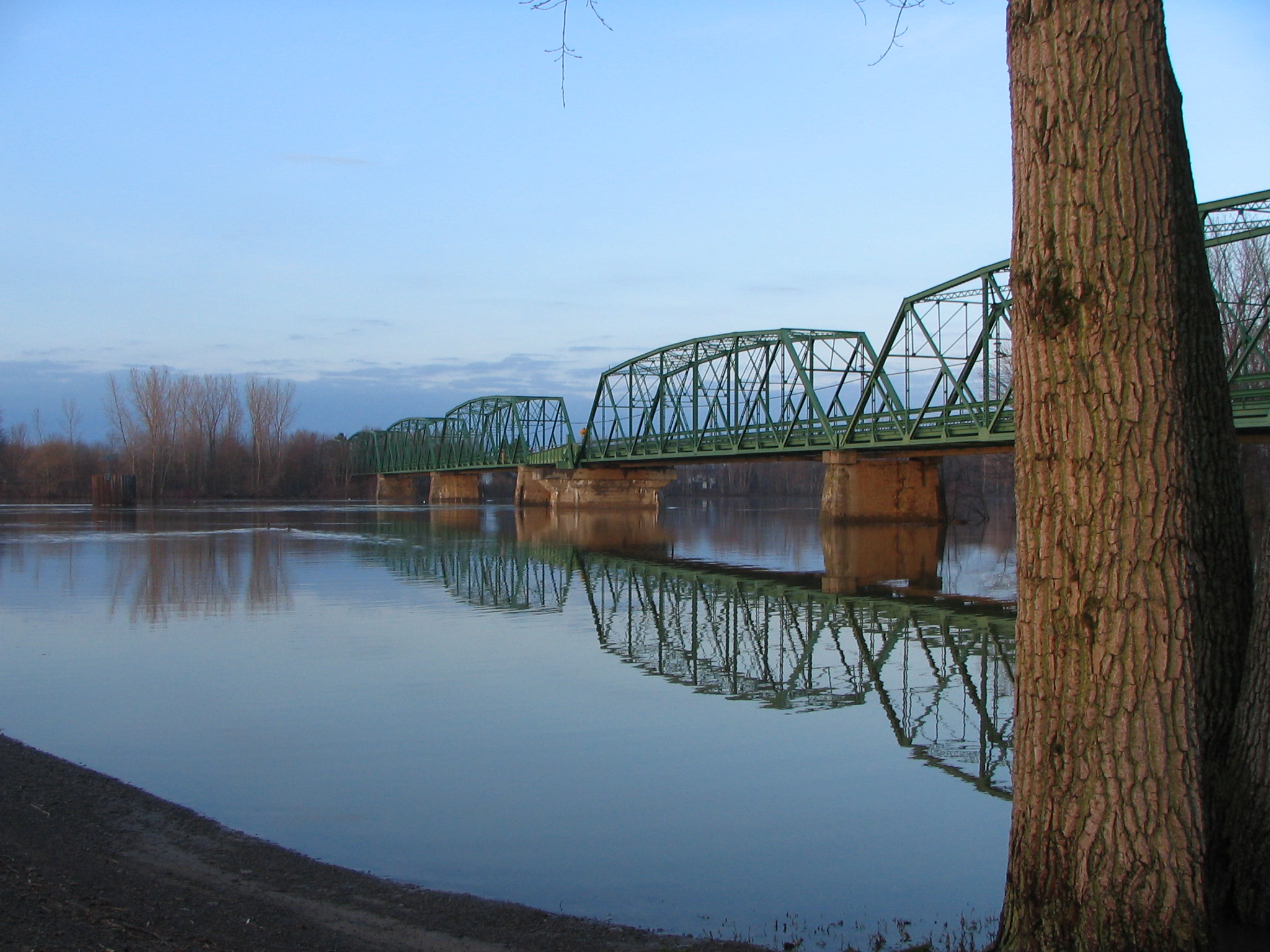
Batiscan, Chemin du Roy (Quebec Route 138)

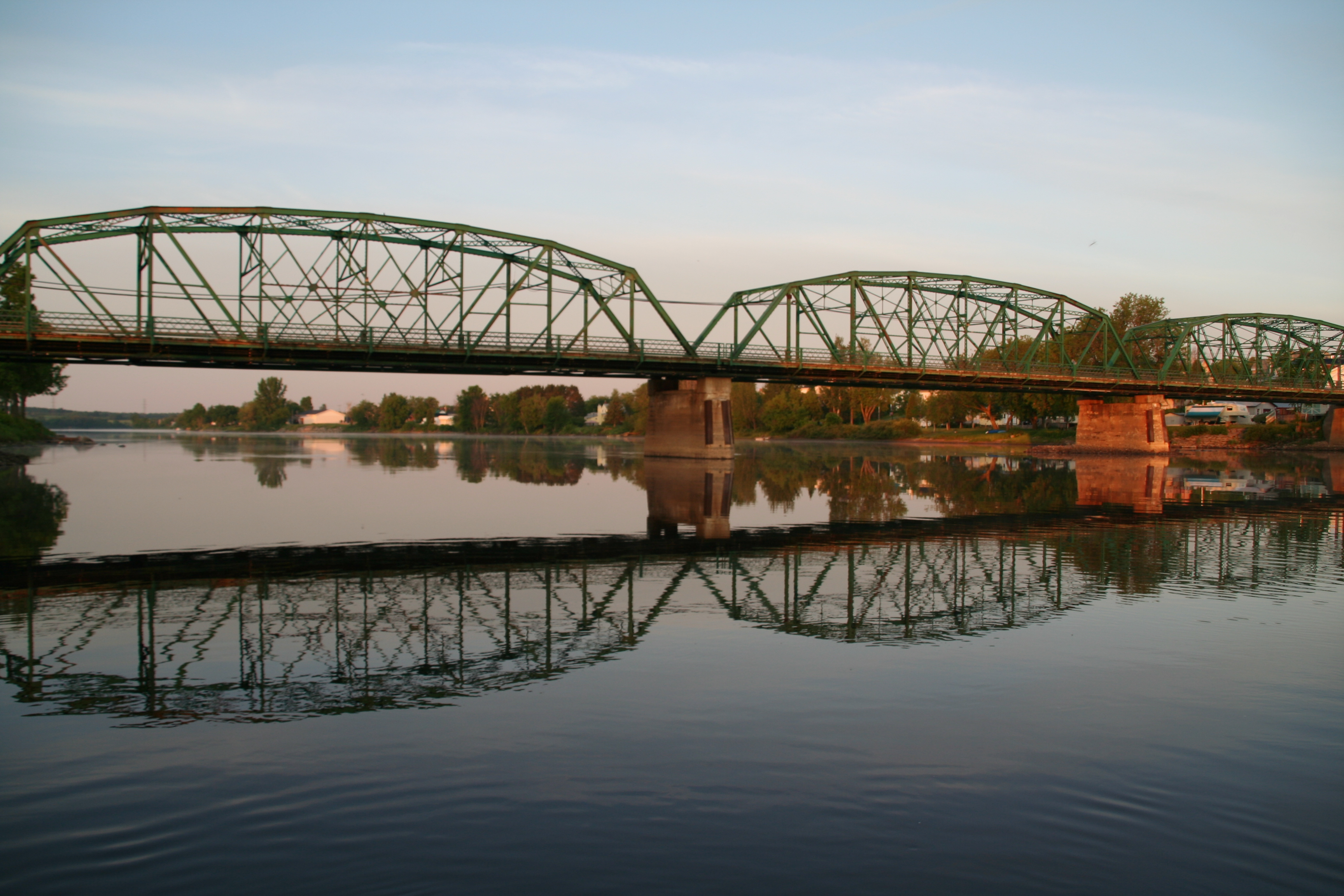
Saint-Stanislas, bridge over the Batiscan River, (Quebec Route 159)

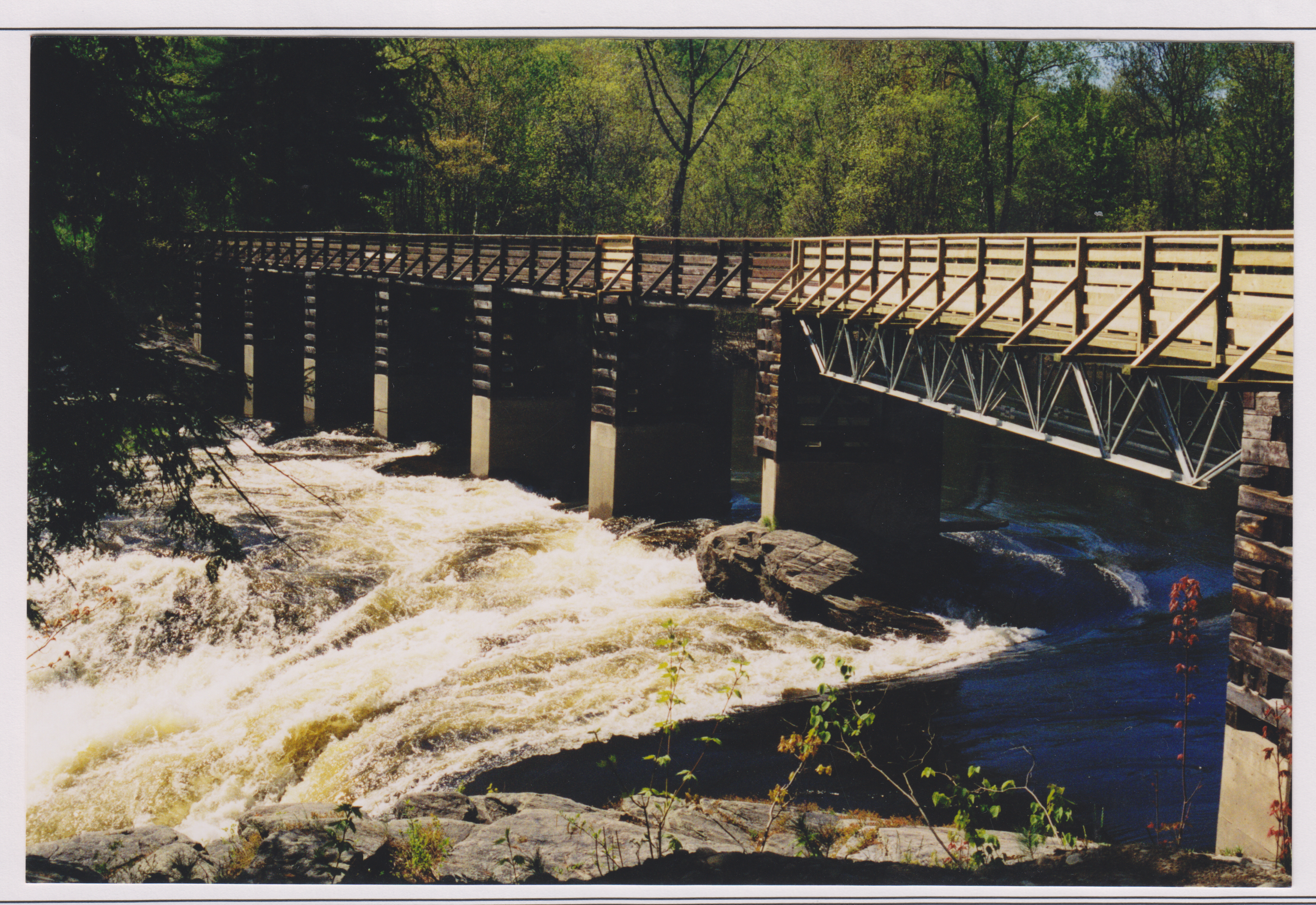
Batiscan River Park, footbridge, spring flow

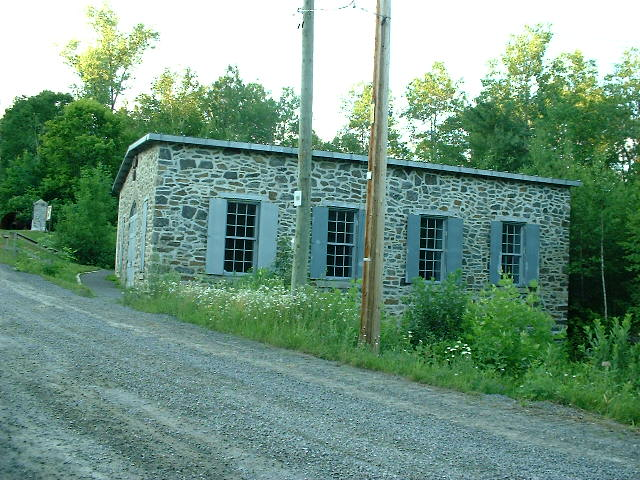
Former annex of the Saint-Narcisse power plant
