= Lake Hackett =

Lake in Lac-Masketsi, Quebec, Canada

- "Lake Hackett (Mékinac)", in Lac-Masketsi, Quebec (unorganised territoiry), in Batiscanie, in Quebec
- Location: Quebec
- Coordinates: 47°05′08″N 72°27′15″W
- Type: Natural
- Basin countries: Canada
- Max. length: 4.8 km (3.0 mi)
- Max. width: 1.7 km (1 mi)
- Settlements: Mékinac Regional County Municipality

Lake Hackett is located in Hackett (township) in the unorganized territory of Lac-Masketsi, in the Mekinac Regional County Municipality, in the administrative region of Mauricie, in Quebec, in Canada.

== Toponymy ==
The names of "Hackett Lake" and "Hackett (township)" are derived from the surname of Michael Felix Hackett (1851-1926), secretary and "registrar" in the firm Edmund James Flynn and Prime Minister of Quebec in 1896 and 1897. After his studies at McGill University, Hackett was admitted to the Bar of Quebec in 1874. Thereafter, he was mayor of Stanstead Plain from 1890 to 1904, Conservative MP for the Legislative Assembly from 1892 to 1900, and a judge of the Superior Court of the District of Bedford from 1915.

The toponym "Lake Hackett" was officially registered on December 5, 1968, at the Bank of Place Names in Commission de toponymie du Québec (Geographical Names Board of Québec).

== Geography ==
Lake Hackett (Mekinac) has a length of 4.8 km in the north-south axis (and a maximum width of 1.7 km), including the long strait in the southern part, resulting into the "Lac du Canard" (Duck Lake) which has a large area consisting of marshes. The headwaters of the subwatershed is Calau lake (1 km long) which flows to the north-east into the Suève lake (710 m long). The discharge of the later flows over 1.25 km to the northeast and empties into "Lac du Canard".

A strait of 2.8 km at northeast (which forms the lake logic) connects the Hackett Lake to Garneau Lake (2.6 km long, shaped like a "U"). South of the later, the Heloise lake (1.8 km long) connects the Garneau Lake with a short Strait. The Heloise lake straddles the townships of Hackett and Marmier.

A dam that was built on the rock by Hydro-Québec in 1995 at the mouth of Lake Hackett creates the great reservoir "Hackett", an area of 438.8 ha with a holding capacity 19,305,000 m³. With a length of 20 m., the dam has a height of 5.5 m and a height of 4.4 m holding. Coordinates of the dam: latitude: 47° 05'; longitude: - 72° 27'

Located in the Zec Tawachiche, its mouth flows into the "Ruisseau des îles" (Stream of Islands), which course on 3.25 km north-west and flows into the Rivière aux eaux mortes (Mékinac). The latter flows into the Rivière du Milieu (Mékinac) which goes south to empty into the northern part of Mékinac Lake.

Starting at Hervey-Jonction, visitors can travel 30 km to reach the southern part of Lake Hackett. It can be reached by taking Tawachiche road leading to Zec Tawachiche (in north-east), through the Audy sector; then taking the Tawachiche East road, passing near the Lake Terrien (Mékinac).

== Related Items ==
- Michael Felix Hackett
- Hackett (township)
- Mekinac Regional County Municipality
- Lac-Masketsi, unorganized territory
- Mékinac Lake
- Trois-Rives municipality
- Lac-aux-Sables municipality
- Zec Tawachiche
- Mauricie
- Tawachiche River
- Rivière aux eaux mortes (Mékinac)
- Tawachiche West River
