= Rivière aux eaux mortes (Mékinac) =

Coordinates: 47.1139°N 72.6181°W

Location
- Country: Canada

Physical characteristics
- Source
  - location: Lac-Lapeyrère, unorganized territory
  - elevation: 1,191 ft (363 m)
- Mouth
  - location: Rivière du milieu (Mékinac)

The Rivière aux eaux mortes (River of dead waters) flows entirely in forest areas in two territories Quebec, in Canada:

- Upper part of the river: in the unorganized territory of Lac-Lapeyrère in Portneuf Wildlife Reserve, in the administrative region of the Capitale-Nationale;
- Lower part of the river: in the unorganized territory of Lac-Masketsi, in the Mékinac Regional County Municipality in Mauricie. The territory is mostly administered by the Zec Tawachiche.

== Toponymy ==
This French river name describes the lazy nature of the water in several segments of the river. This phenomenon stems from the little slope on the course of the river, between "lac à la digue" to its mouth in the Rivière du Milieu (Mékinac).

The name "Rivière aux eaux mortes (Mékinac)" was officially registered on December 5, 1968 in the Bank of place names of the Commission de toponymie du Québec (Geographical Names Board of Québec)

== Geography ==
The "Rivière aux eaux mortes (Mékinac)" takes its source from several lakes in the high mountains of the Portneuf Wildlife Reserve: "lac à l'Orignal" (moose lake), Desrochers, Turner, Aumond, Liserons, Pilote, "aux oreilles" (ears), "du Mâle" and "du coin" (corner). Waters from upstream flow into the lake Desrochers whose mouth is located at south; from the mouth, the "Rivière aux eaux mortes (Mékinac)" descends on 2.1 km to go across the lake Rocheleau (length of 0.9 km). From the mouth of the latter lake, the river descends on 5.2 km to empty on the west side of Lake Dussault (length of 400 m.).

Two other rivers feed the lake Dussault, one of the major waterways of the head of the "Rivière aux eaux mortes":

- St-Malo Brook, which originates at Lake St-Malo, and on it way downward cross the lakes Forgeron and Viking;
- Lanctôt stream which originates at Lake Lanctôt on the boundary of the township of Pothier and Lapeyrère.

After Dussault Lake dam, the river flows prior to the southwest, on 2,2 km, and pass through the "lac de la digue" (lake of the dam) which is 2,2 km in length. From the dam of the latest lake, the river flows on 11 km to the South up to the mouth of Lake Bony. From that junction, the river flows South-West on 3.6 km up to the mouth of "Lac à l'Ours" (Bear Lake). From there, the river flows for one kilometer to the north-west, then branches back to the southwest to form a large reservoir retained by the dam downstream of the hamlet of Doheney, which is the only village visited by the river. This reservoir has the shape of an inverted question mark. In summary, the river flows on 33 km (measured by water) from Lake Dussault dam down to its mouth.

The mouth of the river flows on the eastern shore of the Rivière du milieu (Mékinac) at 1.9 km (direct line) south of the Canadian National railroad bridge, or 1 5 km south of the mouth of the Saint-Arnaud Creek.

The course of the river has four dams listed by the "Centre d'expertise hydrique du Québec" (Centre for water expertise of Quebec) from Lake Dussault:

Directory of dams on the "Rivière aux eaux mortes"
	Dam Dussault	Dam of "Lac à la digue"	"Barrage à l'Ours" (Bear Dam)	Barrage de la Rivière-aux-eaux-mortes (Dam of the Rivière aux eaux mortes
Longitudes	-72⁰ 28'	-72⁰ 28'	-72⁰ 32'	-72⁰ 35'
Latitudes	47⁰ 10'	47⁰ 09'	47⁰ 04'	47⁰ 05'
Territory	Lac-Lapeyrère (TNO), Portneuf Wildlife Reserve	Lac-Lapeyrère (TNO), Portneuf Wildlife Reserve	Lac-Masketsi, Quebec (TNO), Zec Tawachiche	Lac-Masketsi (TNO), Zec Tawachiche
Usage	recreational and resort	Wildlife	recreational and resort	recreational, resort and fauna
Dam height	3.9 m	6.9 m	4.7 m	4.1 m
Height retainer	0.8 m	5.7 m	3.3 m	1.9 m
Type of Dam	Concrete Gravity	Wood cabinets filled with stones	Free rockfill weir	Concrete gravity
Building year	1980	1980	2011	1986
Area Basin	-	2 km²	216 km²	255 km²
Holding Capacity	60 000 m³	489 500 m³	3,260,000 m³	2,124,300 m³
Length of the book	60.4 m	30.7 m	70 m	158 m
Reservoir area	8 ha	17.3 ha	100 ha	219 ha
Length of discharge	-	2200 m	-	9400 m
Average width	-	78.8 m	-	233 m
Owner	Centre d'expertise hydrique du Québec (Centre of water expertise of Quebec)	Centre of water expertise of Quebec	Ducks Unlimited Canada	Centre of water expertise of Québec

The coordinates of the mouth of the "Rivière aux eaux mortes" are: west longitude 72° 37' 05" north latitude 47° 06' 50". The mouth of this river is located at:

- 2.9 km from the village of Rivière-du-Milieu;
- 4.9 km from the "Dam of rivière aux eaux mortes"
- 8.7 km from the "Dam à l'Ours";
- 10.1 km (direct line) or 14 km (by water) from the mouth of "Lac à l'Ours"
- 10.7 km from the mouth of "lac Froid" (Cold Lake);
- 13.1 km from the "Barrage de la digue" (Dam of "la digue");
- 6.2 km from the hamlet of Doheney.

Along the way, the track of the Canadian National Railway between Hervey-Jonction to La Tuque bypasses the eastern shores Lake Masketsi (Mékinac) and “Lac Froid” (Cold Lake). Then the railroad reached the west shore of the reservoir of "Rivière aux eaux mortes”. The railway passes the hamlet of Doheney then passes the hamlet of Rivière-du-Milieu, before crossing a long bridge spanning the Rivière du Milieu (Mékinac). Since 1909, the railroad was a key factor in the development of forestry and tourist activities in the area.

== Key attractions ==
Observational nature enthusiasts will love the range of concentration of waterfowl, located in a wetland on the "Rivière aux eaux mortes". This particular area attracts moose and birds.

== See also ==
- Rivière du milieu (Mékinac)
- Mékinac Regional County Municipality
- Zec Tawachiche
- Lac-Masketsi, unorganized territory
- Portneuf Wildlife Reserve
- Lac-Lapeyrère, unorganized territory
