= Lake Roberge (Lac-Masketsi) =

Lake in Lac-Masketsi, Quebec, Canada

- Location within Quebec
- Location: Mékinac Regional County Municipality, Mauricie, Quebec
- Coordinates: 46°59′37″N 72°31′51″W
- Lake type: Natural
- Basin countries: Canada
- Max. length: 2.25 km (1.40 mi)
- Max. width: 1.25 km (0.78 mi)

"Lake Roberge (Lac-Masketsi)" in Batiscanie, in Quebec

The Roberge Lake is located in the unorganized territory of Lac-Masketsi, Quebec, the Mekinac Regional County Municipality, in Mauricie, in Quebec, in Canada. This lake whose surface is usually frozen from November to April is located entirely in forest land.

== Geography ==
The length of the lake Roberge (Lac-Masketsi) is 2.25 km (north–south axis) and its maximum width is 1.25 km. A strip of land (in the north–south axis) whose width varies between 0.7 km and 1.6 km, with mountains, separates the lake and Roberge Lake Masketsi which is located west of the first.

Within 1.3 km north of Lake Roberge, four small lakes including Lake Faber and lake Narcisse are draining into Lake Roberge. North of these lakes, we encounter the dividing line between the water catchment areas of the Saint-Maurice River and Batiscan River.

The Tawachiche Road West runs along the west shore of Lake Roberge.

== Toponymy ==
The name "Lake Roberge" was officially registered on December 5, 1968, in the Bank of place names of the Commission de toponymie du Québec (Geographical Names Board of Québec)

== See also ==
- Mekinac Regional County Municipality (RCM)
- Lac-Masketsi, unorganized territory
- Batiscanie watershed
- Trois-Rives municipality
- Lac-aux-Sables municipality
- Zec Tawachiche (controlled harvesting zone)
- Mauricie, an administrative region of Quebec
- Tawachiche River
- Tawachiche West River
- Batiscan River
