= Tawachiche =

These place names containing the name "Tawachiche" means places or rivers, all located in the municipality of Lac-aux-Sables in Mauricie, in the province of Quebec, in Canada:

- Zec Tawachiche, a zone d'exploitation contrôlée (controlled harvesting zone), located in the upper watershed of the Tawachiche River and West Tawachiche
- Tawachiche River, a tributary of the right bank of the Batiscan River
- Tawachiche West River, a tributary of the right bank of the Tawachiche River
- Chemin Tawachiche
- Chemin Tawachiche East, following the Tawachiche River (East section) from the mouth of the Tawachiche West River (the entrance station of the Zec Tawachiche) up towards the northeast
- Chemin Tawachiche west, starting at the visitor center of the Zec Tawachiche along the Tawachiche West River and Railway CN between Hervey-Jonction and La Tuque
