= Rivière du milieu (Mékinac) =

River in Canada

Rivière du Milieu
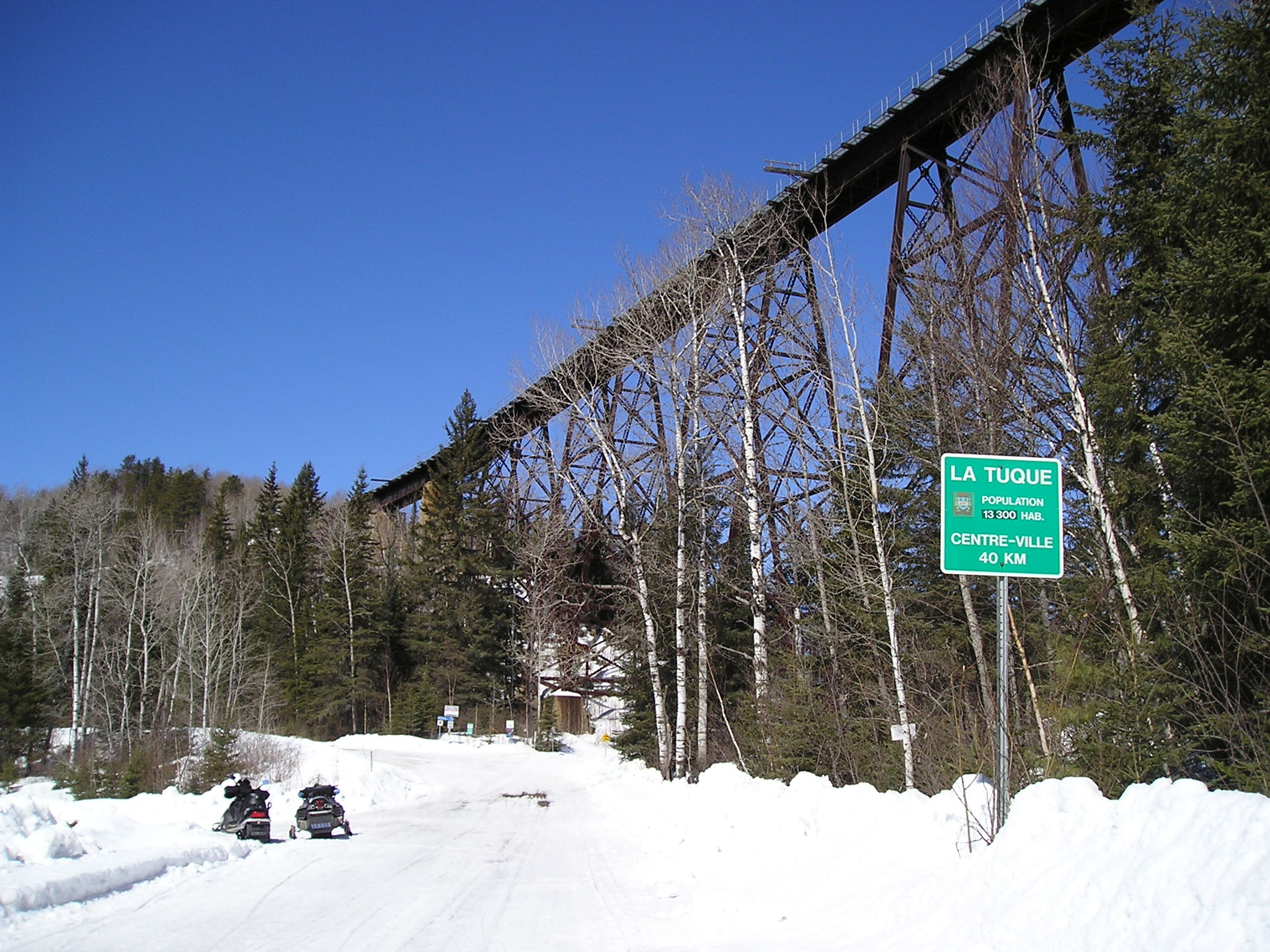
- Trestle bridge on Rivière du Milieu

- Location within Quebec

Location
- Country: Canada
- Province: Quebec
- Region: Mauricie
- Regional County Municipality: Mékinac Regional County Municipality

Physical characteristics
- Source: Lake Dusseau
  - location: Portneuf Wildlife Reserve
  - coordinates: 47°18′10″N 72°28′51″W
  - elevation: 345 m (1,132 ft)
- Mouth: Mékinac Lake
  - location: Trois-Rives
  - coordinates: 47°05′20″N 72°39′00″W
  - elevation: 165 m (541 ft)
- Length: 379 km (235 mi)

Basin features
- Progression: Mékinac Lake, Mékinac River, Saint-Maurice River, Saint Lawrence River
- Tributaries
  - left: (upstream) rivière aux eaux mortes (Mékinac), décharge du lac Melba, décharge du lac Calvé
  - right: (upstream) Bessonne River, ruisseau Prévost, ruisseau Read, rivière aux Brochets (Lac-Masketsi)

The Rivière du Milieu ('River of the middle') (popularly named River Pike) flows southward in the unorganized territory of Lac-Masketsi, in the Mekinac Regional County Municipality, in Mauricie, in Quebec, in Canada.

The economy of this sector is based on the forestry and railways activities, as well as tourist activities, including hunting, fishing, ATVs and snowmobiles. Since the early 20th century, this area is served by the Canadian National Railway between Hervey-Jonction and La Tuque. A very long railway bridge spans the “Rivière du Milieu”. In the past, a small hamlet existed around the station at Rivière-du-Milieu.

== Geography ==
The “Rivière du Milieu” flows entirely in forest land. The route starts near the river (southeast) of Lake Wayagamac. Much of its course is located in the Zec de la Bessonne, but the last kilometers through the Zec Tawachiche.

From the railway of Canadian National, the very serpentine river crosses several wetland areas, a distance of about 5.8 km (direct line) to fund a flared valley to its mouth. Aerial maps do seem dozens of small lakes on either side of the river. A small delta appears at the mouth of the “Rivière du Milieu" which empties into the north-east of Mékinac Lake.

The «Rivière à l’eau morte” (River in the dead water) which is the main tributary (East Bank) of “Rivière du milieu”, flows first to the southwest, turns north, past the hamlet «Doheney» and then redirects westward. The mouth of the «Rière à l’eau morte» is located 4 km (measured in a straight line) upstream of the mouth of the «Rivière du Milieu" or 2.1 km downstream of the railway bridge crossing the “Rivière du milieu”.

With their boat, boaters can navigate in part in the meander path of the Middle River. The Government of Québec recognized one of the few sanctuaries for reproduction of aquatic fauna, covering a segment of the river, the fishing activities are therefore prohibited throughout year.

== Toponymy ==
The name "Rivière du Milieu” (Mekinac) means that this river is midway on the rail route between Hervey-Jonction and La Tuque. This name was officially registered on December 5, 1968, in the register of place names of the Commission de toponymie du Québec (Geographical Names Board of Québec).

== See also ==
- Lac-Masketsi, unorganized territory
- Mekinac Regional County Municipality
- Mauricie
- Mékinac Lake
- Trois-Rives
- Zec Tawachiche
- Rivière aux eaux mortes (Mékinac)
