= Masketsi =

Masketsi may refer to:

- Lac-Masketsi, unorganized territory in the Mauricie region of Quebec, Canada
- Lake Masketsi (Mékinac), source of the Tawachiche West River, located in Lac-Masketsi, Quebec
