= Lake Terrien =

Lake in Quebec, Canada

Lake Terrien (Mékinac)
- Location within Quebec
- Location: Quebec
- Coordinates: 46°59′07″N 72°26′20″W
- Type: Natural
- Primary outflows: Tawachiche River
- Basin countries: Canada
- Max. length: 2.0 km (1.2 mi)
- Max. width: 0.3 km (0.19 mi)
- Settlements: Lac-aux-Sables

Lake Terrien (sometimes referred to the surname "Therrien") is a lake located in the Marmier (township), in the municipality of Lac-aux-Sables, in Mékinac Regional County Municipality, in the administrative region of Mauricie at Quebec, Canada.

== Geography ==
Terrien Lake is located in the Zec Tawachiche, in the forest zone. Terrien lake is shaped like a large S in the north-south direction. It feeds on the north by Lake Outlet Deep and north-east by the Lake Quessi. Terrien lake is located 15 minute’s drive from the entrance of the ZEC, taking the path Tawachiche East. The path Tawachiche East bypasses the lake by the Terrien on East side.

Arranged by the Government of Quebec, a dam is located at the outlet of Lake Terrien, southwest side of the lake, on the course of the Tawachiche River. Initially, the dam was built at the mouth of Lake Terrien in autumn 1933 by Veillette & Frères Ltée. Rebuilt in 1950, the dam is 29 m in length and was erected in the "foothills of wood (candles)" genre. The dam has a capacity of holding 512,500 cubic meters and a height of 2.1 m holding. Its use is primarily for wildlife. The reservoir surface area is 25 ha and the catchment area is 31.1 km². The owner of the dam is the Centre d'expertise hydrique du Québec

== Key Benefits ==
Since 2009, climbers frequent the granite cliff overlooking a bog and the western shore of Lake Terrien. In many places, the cliff has sustained over 50 metres (160 ft) verticality, with some sequences of near 100 metres (330 ft). A boat is required to reach the foot of the cliff whose orientation is south, southeast, which allows it to climb from March to November. Cape Tawachiche inherited a Native American legend that transcends in the names of the five sectors of the cliff: Tomahawk (sections Chamane, Grand-duc, Totem), été indien, Attimakekw, Wometaci et Maskwaaskwaaskwa

== Toponymy ==
The name "Lake Terrien" was recorded December 5, 1968, at the Bank of place names of the "Commission de toponymie du Québec" (Geographical Names Board of Québec)

The name "Terrien Dam" was recorded on January 24, 2002, at the Bank of place names of the "Commission de toponymie du Québec".

== See also ==
- Tawachiche River
- Batiscanie, Quebec
- Zec Tawachiche
- Lac-aux-Sables
- Hervey-Jonction
