= Lake Roberge =

Lake Roberge may refer to:

- Lake Roberge (Grandes-Piles)
- Lake Roberge (Lac-Masketsi)
