= Rivière aux Brochets (Lac-Masketsi) =

Location
- Country: Canada
- Province: Quebec
- Region: Mauricie
- Regional County Municipality: Mékinac Regional County Municipality

Physical characteristics
- Source: Lac Traversy
  - location: La Tuque (Canton de Pothier)
  - coordinates: 47°16′36″N 72°41′03″W
  - elevation: 345 m (1,132 ft)
- Mouth: Rivière du Milieu (Mékinac)
  - location: La Tuque (canton de Carignan)
  - coordinates: 47°07′43″N 72°36′55″W
  - elevation: 170 m (560 ft)
- Length: 25.8 km (16.0 mi)

Basin features
- Progression: Rivière du Milieu (Mékinac), Mékinac River, Saint-Maurice River, Saint Lawrence River
- Tributaries
  - left: (upstream)
  - right: (upstream)

The rivière aux Brochets is a tributary of the rivière du Milieu, flowing in the territory of the city of La Tuque and in the unorganized territory of Lac-Masketsi (MRC of Mékinac Regional County Municipality), in the administrative region of Mauricie, in the province of Quebec, in Canada.

== Geography ==
The Rivière aux Brochets has its source at the mouth of Lac Traversy (length: 0.9 km (0.56 mi); altitude: 358 m (1,175 ft)); this body of water is located in the former unorganized territory of Petit-lac-Wayagamac, in the territory of La Tuque, at 5.2 km (3.2 mi) south-east of lake Wayagamac and 5.4 km (3.4 mi) southeast of the lake at Beauce. This lake is part of the zec de la Bessonne.

From the mouth of Lac Traversy, the Rivière aux Brochets flows on 25.8 km (16.0 mi) in the following segments:

- 3.6 km (2.2 mi) northwesterly, crossing lac Goulet and lac Cuisy, to the bridge located at the mouth of the latter;
- 4.7 km (2.9 mi) towards the south-east, cutting the Canadian National railway, crossing Lapointe lake (altitude: 228 m (748 ft)), to at the mouth of Lake Albert (length: 0.5 km (0.31 mi); altitude: 221 m (725 ft)) that the current crosses over its full length; this lake is part of the Thiffault lakes;
- 4.8 km (3.0 mi) south-east, to the mouth of Lac aux Brochets (length: 2.7 km (1.7 mi); altitude: 215 m (705 ft) ) that the current passes through its full length;
- 8.0 km (5.0 mi) towards the south-east, crossing Lac du Chat (length: 2.7 km (1.7 mi); altitude: 205 m (673 ft)) than the current crosses its full length;
- 4.7 km (2.9 mi) south-east winding to the confluence of the river.

The confluence of the Rivière aux Brochets flows onto the northwestern shore of the Rivière du Milieu, in the township of Carignan, almost at the limit of the township of Hackett. This confluence is located at:

- 2.5 km (1.6 mi) east of the northern bay of Mékinac Lake;
- 1.0 km (0.62 mi) west of the center of the hamlet of rivière du Milieu;
- 4.6 km (2.9 mi) northeast of the confluence of the rivière du Milieu.

== Toponymy ==
The toponym Rivière aux Brochets was formalized on December 5, 1968, at the Place Names Bank of the Commission de toponymie du Québec.

== See also ==
- List of rivers of Quebec
