= Island of the Cross =

Island in Canada

Native name: Île à la Croix
- Location within Quebec

Geography
- Location: Batiscan River
- Coordinates: 47°13′20″N 72°15′35″W
- Adjacent to: Batiscan River
- Total islands: 1
- Length: 1 km (0.6 mi)
- Width: 0.3 km (0.19 mi)
- Highest elevation: 244 m (801 ft)
- Highest point: 258

Administration
- Canada
- Province: Quebec
- Regional County Municipality: Portneuf
- Unorganized territory: Lac-Lapeyrère

Demographics
- Population: 0 (2011)

The Island of the Cross (Île à la Croix) is located in the middle of the Batiscan River, at the northern edge of the eastern part of the Portneuf Wildlife Reserve, in the area designated "Miguick-Île à la Croix", the unincorporated Lac-Lapeyrère, Quebec territory, Portneuf Regional County Municipality, in the administrative area of the Capitale-Nationale, in the province of Quebec, Canada.

By 1888, near the Miguick River, a quarry of granite began to be exploited, through the construction of the railway connecting the Lower Batiscanie and Upper Batiscanie.

== Toponymy ==
The French toponym "Ïle-à-la-Croix" was officially recorded December 5, 1968 in the bank of place names at the Commission de toponymie du Québec (Geographical Names Board of Quebec). Formerly, a cross was planted on the island as protection for travellers on the river regularly surreptitiously caused the drowning. The rapids upstream and downstream of the island are deemed dangerous for boats river. The cross also protect residents and seasonal workers fast river (upstream and downstream) and sometimes considerable floods accentuated the risk of injury or drowning.

In Judeo-Christian origin place name "Island of the Cross" is akin to the place name "Lac à la Croix" which is located at 9.3 kilometres (5.8 mi) southern of Lac-Édouard. The Batiscan River, which rises in Lake Édouard flows into the "Lac à la croix". Fifty kilometres (following the route of the river) separate the mouth of the lake and the island at the cross.

== Geography ==
The "Island of the Cross" (Île à la Croix) is located 63 km south of the village of Lac-Édouard in Upper-Batiscanie, 26 kilometres (16 mi) north of the village of Notre-Dame-de-Montauban and 27 kilometres (17 mi) (direct line) of the church of Rivière-à-Pierre.

The island is 1.5 kilometres (0.93 mi) from Miguick hamlet, 4.5 kilometres (2.8 mi) and from Linton 7 kilometres (4.3 mi), which is downstream from the mouth of the Jeannotte River.

The island is shaped like a foot (toes pointing to the southwest and the heel to the mouth of the Miguick River (Quebec)) with a length of one kilometre and a maximum width of 300 metres (980 ft). The altitude of the water upstream of the island is 246 m and 244 m downstream. "Island of the Cross" is the main island of a small archipelago that can be designated "archipelago Miguick" with 11 other islands including nine upstream. The last small island (altitude: 244 m) is located further downstream in front of the outlet of Lac de la Daraise (west side of the Batiscan River).

Highway 2 to the Portneuf Wildlife Reserve crosses the northern part of the island in the east-west direction to connect the two main sections of this provincial park, which is divided in two by the Batiscan River. This "Miguick-Île à la Croix" area comprises a small hamlet near the Canadian National Railway, on the east side of Batiscan River. The Via Rail passenger train stops if needed.

== History ==
Its strategic geographic position in front of the mouth of Miguick River (Quebec) (east side of Batiscan River), ¨Île à la Croix served as resting place of Batiscan River during the Amerindian prehistory. In front of the island, the Miguick River (Quebec) mouth is very quiet and winding; it was particularly favorable for hunting moose and beavers.

This legendary island of Batiscanie, also served as a landmark on expeditions on the river. Among the early explorers French Canadian to visit the area of the island, there were fur traders who practiced trade, Catholic evangelists and explorers designated by the civil and religious authorities. Annually, at the end of spring, loggers went around the banks of the river, including the island to the Cross to return to the water the logs coming down the river to sawmills downstream, including Saint-Stanislas. Log drives ended in 1963 on Batiscan River. After the season of logs driving many workers became "cageux" (cage workers) for sawmills, others often went to work on farms in the Lower or Middle-Batiscanie.

In the 19th century, the government was granting logging on public lands more distant from the Lower Batiscanie. Prior to the 1888-1889 construction of the railway to Upper Batiscanie, every winter, ice roads were constructed on the Batiscan River by forest contractors to bring hundreds forest workers at a time, accompanied with their herds of horses (sometimes over 100 horses), their sleights, all required rigging and provisions for the use of forest sites in Middle or Upper Batiscanie Batiscanie. These men and their horses coming back down in the spring by the same ice roads before the great debacle. These ice roads should avoid areas where the ice was weak (especially in the rapids or falls) by clearing the pathways on the mainland. The construction of the railway along the Batiscan River and roads (public or private), have reduced the need to use these long ice roads. However, the ice roads continued to be appointed at various places for local needs to cross the river.

== Leisure ==
The Island of the Cross is known for wild camping and various outdoor activities. The island turns to be a breakpoint or starting point for raids by boat down the river to Notre-Dame-de-Montauban. Many canoeists begin their expedition down the rapids of the Batiscan River from the Canadian National Railway iron bridge that spans the mouth of the Miguick River (Quebec), located just in front of the island.

== See also ==
- Batiscanie
- Batiscan River
- Jeannotte River
- Miguick River (Quebec)
- Portneuf Wildlife Reserve
