= Marmier (township) =

Township in Mékinac Regional County Municipality, Quebec, Canada

Coordinates: 46°59′N 72°28′W

Marmier township is located in the municipalities of Lac-aux-Sables and Notre-Dame-de-Montauban, in the Mekinac Regional County Municipality, in the administrative region of Mauricie, on the north shore of Saint Lawrence River, Quebec, Canada. In Quebec, a "canton" (township in English) is a historic cadastral division of the territory to facilitate the grant of public lands to individuals for colonization.

== Geography ==
Township Marmier is located east of the Lejeune Township and north-west of the Batiscan River. Its territory includes the Zec Tawachiche. The Tawachiche River and Tawachiche West River flow entirely within the Marmier township.

The lakes of the Marmier township are: Germain, "du Midi", Hackett, Fontaine, Price, Bégin, du Milieu, Boiteau, Buffon, Profond et Terrien.

The Railway of Canadian National Railway linking Hervey-Jonction to La Tuque pass through the township Marmier, between Audy station and Lac-Masketsi station.

== Toponymy ==
The names "Marmier township" and Lejeune Township were announced simultaneously on September 4, 1892. Marmier township was formalized in the register of place names of the Commission de toponymie du Québec (Geographical Names Board of Québec), on December 5, 1968.

The name "Marmier township" originated in honor of a French prolific writer Xavier Marmier (1809-1892), originally from Pontarlier (east of France), in the Doubs. Following the publication of several books chronicling his travels in Scandinavia, Poland and Russia, this writer lived in 1849 in Lower Canada, particularly in Quebec and Montreal, and then in Upper Canada. After publishing his "Letters on America" in 1852 in Paris, the writer published the novel "The Betrothed Spitzbergen" (1858). Marmier was elected to the French Academy in 1870.

== See also ==
- Batiscanie, Quebec
