= Miguick River =

Miguick River Magwak - Makwa
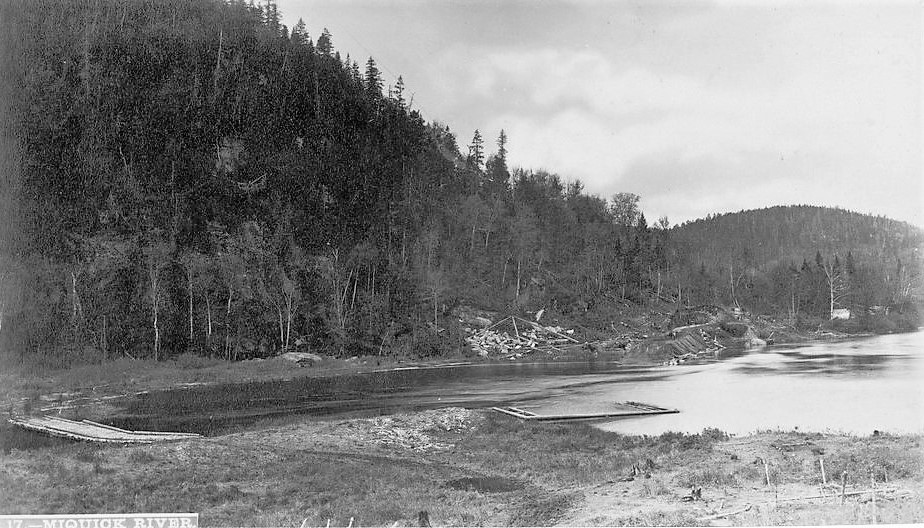
- Form railroad (late 1890)
- Etymology: Algonquin

Location
- Country: Canada
- Province: Quebec
- Region: Capitale-Nationale
- Regional County Municipality: Portneuf Regional County Municipality
- Unorganized territory and a municipality: Linton

Physical characteristics
- Source: La Salle Lake
  - location: Linton
  - coordinates: 47.25694°N 72.11639°W
  - elevation: 475
- Mouth: Batiscan River
  - location: Linton
  - coordinates: 47.21889°N 72.25584°W
  - elevation: 392 km (244 mi)
- Length: 16 km (9.9 mi)

Basin features
- Tributaries
  - left: (Upward from the mouth) Ruisseau des Aulnes, décharge du lac Bellevue.
  - right: (Upward from the mouth) Décharge du lac Miguick, décharge du lac Cavelier, décharge du lac des quatre baies.

The Miguick River flows in the unincorporated territory of Linton, in the Portneuf Regional County Municipality), in the administrative region the Capitale-Nationale, in the province of Quebec, Canada. The watershed of Miguick river is 303 square kilometres (117 mi^{2}), the third largest pool of Batiscanie.

== Geography ==
Miguick River starts at the outlet of La Salle Lake, heading north after about 2 kilometres (1.2 mi), to empty in Cuckoo Lake. In this segment of its course, the water of the river pass through many rapids. Then the river makes a large curve to head south, 14 kilometres (8.7 mi) before emptying into the Batiscan River (on left bank), facing the Island of the Cross (Quebec), or 7.5 kilometres (4.7 mi) below the mouth of the Jeannotte River. Several tributaries increase the volume of the river including the discharge of Miguick Lake.

Near the mouth, there is a hamlet named "Miguick" (same toponym as the river). Via Rail train stop there upon request. An important railway bridge is crossing the Miguick river mouth. In the last kilometers of its course, Miguick river follows a very serpentine path.

== Toponymy ==
Translate from french
The term Miguick is known at least since the arrival of the railway in this sector, around 1888–89. The designation "Miguick" is Aboriginal origin. The term is similar to the words "magwak" or "makwa" which means "bear" in the Algonquin language. The name has changed with the use by the forestry workers, loggers, workers of the railway, missionaries, explorers... The name "Miguick River" was officially registered on December 5, 1968, in the register of the "Commission de toponymie du Québec" (Geographical Names Board of Québec)

== History ==
Until the arrival of the railroad around 1888–89, the sector of Miguick river was accessible only by boat on Batiscan River, when the ice was gone. From November to April, thanks to the ice, the area became accessible with cars pulled by horses. However, the snow conditions could limit traffic. Well known by indigenous people, the valley of the river attracted hunters, fishermen and trappers. In the second half of the 19th century, logging was granted on the outskirts of the Batiscan River and its tributaries.

The exploitation of this forest in the area has been furthered by the construction of access roads and the arrival of the railroad from 1888 to 1889 to the Mid Batiscanie. This stretch of railroad will reach later Chambord, Lac Saint-Jean. The extraction of architectural stone began around 1888 near the Miguick river in a quarry operated by Mr. Bélanger, a mason of Quebec City. The stone from this quarry was used to build the base including the Jacques Cartier (section Monuments), opened on June 24, 1889, by the Saint-Jean-Baptiste Society. Masons of this quarry also tailored the stones of the wall of the former courthouse in Quebec. The type of stone from this quarry was a pinkish gray farsundite coming from the "Suite Rivière-à-Pierre".

In Miguick sector, recreational and tourist activities have grown intensely priori through private clubs and the implementation of the Portneuf Wildlife Reserve.

== See also ==
- Municipal Directory - Linton - Unorganized Territory
- Commission de toponymmie du Québec (Geographical Names Board of Québec)
- Municipal Affairs and Regions - Regional maps
- White River (Portneuf), Quebec
- Rivière-à-Pierre
- Portneuf County, Quebec
- List of rivers of Quebec
