= Hackett (township) =

The Hackett Township was created on June 2, 1899 by the Government of Quebec. This forested township is located in the unorganized territory of Lac-Masketsi, in the Mekinac Regional County Municipality, in Mauricie, in Quebec, in Canada. The territory of this township is part of the watershed of Saint-Maurice River.

== See also ==
- MRC Mekinac Regional County Municipality
- List of township municipalities in Quebec
- Township Mekinac
- La Tuque
- Lake Hackett (Mékinac)
