= Marmier =

== People ==
- Jules Marmier (1874–1975) is a composer, cellist, organist and Swiss choir leader from Collège Saint-Michel
- Lionel de Marmier (1897–1944), French military pilot
- Xavier Marmier (1808–1892) was a French writer, traveler and translator of European literature of the North

== Toponymy ==
=== Canada ===
- Marmier (township), territory in Mauricie, Quebec
- Marmier Street, road in Montreal, Quebec
- Marmier Street, road in Longueuil, Quebec
