= Serpentine River (Québec) =

Serpentine River (Quebec)
- "Serpentine River (Québec)" in Batiscanie, in Quebec

Location
- Country: Canada, Canada
- Province: Quebec
- Region: Capitale-Nationale
- Regional County Municipality: La Jacques-Cartier
- Unorganized territory: Lac-Lapeyrère

Physical characteristics
- Source: Lake Genest
  - location: Lac-Lapeyrère
  - coordinates: 47.14278°N 72.31055°W
  - elevation: 301 metres (988 ft)
- Mouth: Batiscan River
  - location: Lac-Lapeyrère
  - coordinates: 47.17111°N 72.35111°W
  - elevation: 213 metres (699 ft)
- Length: 2.3 km (1.4 mi)

Basin features
- Tributaries
  - left: (Upward from the mouth)
  - right: (Upward from the mouth)

The Serpentine River flows from the unorganized territory of Lac-Lapeyrère, Quebec, located in the Portneuf Regional County Municipality, in the administrative region of the Capitale-Nationale, in the province of Quebec, Canada. Its course is entirely in the forest zone. The surface of the river is usually frozen from November till April.

This river of Batiscanie has a length of 2.3 km (by water) from its source in Lake Genest. After a tortuous path of one km to the southeast, the Serpentine River narrows to a segment of 200 meters. It then flows into the small lake of oregano (200 meters long). Then she resumes her journey southeast of the lake to flow over 0.9 km, first in line, before turning south and then east. Then the river empties on the right bank of the Batiscan River, between the fall Pierre-Antoine and "Gates of Hell" (portes de l'enfer).

The water feeding the lake Genest from the following major lakes (in descending order): Martel, Pasha, Lapeyrère, Beaujour, Robinson and through (dam to the mouth). The most impressive lake watershed is Lapeyrère lake whose name is associated with this unorganized territory.

== Toponymy ==
The name "Serpentine River" is associated with the winding part of his course, especially for a significant segment of a dozen kilometers berries (on the north bank of the river) downstream of the road bridge (16th Street), built in the south of Lake Genest. However, the rest of the course is not similar to a coil. The name "Serpentine River" was formalized on March 28, 1974, to register the names of places in the Commission de toponymie du Québec (Geographical Names Board of Quebec).

== See also ==
- Batiscanie, Quebec
- Batiscan River
- Zec Tawachiche
- Lac-Lapeyrère, Quebec (unorganized territory)
- List of rivers of Quebec
