= Tawachiche West River =

- Native name: Rivière Tawachiche Ouest (Canadian French)

Location
- Country: Canada
- Province: Quebec
- Region: Mauricie
- Regional County Municipality: Mékinac Regional County Municipality
- Municipality: Lac-aux-Sables

Physical characteristics
- Source: Masketsi Lake
  - location: Lake Masketsi (Mékinac)
  - coordinates: 46°58′47″N 72°32′35″W
  - elevation: 231 m (758 ft)
- Mouth: Tawachiche River
  - location: Lac-aux-Sables
  - coordinates: 46°56′12″N 72°27′35″W
  - elevation: 176 m (577 ft)
- Basin size: 698 mi^{2} (1,810 km^{2})

Basin features
- Tributaries
  - left: (Upward from the mouth) Décharge du lac Vieillotte et Lune, décharge d'un lac non identifié, décharge d'un ensemble de petits lacs non identifiés, décharge d'un ensemble de petits lacs non identifiés.
  - right: (Upward from the mouth) Décharge d'un ensemble de petits lacs non identifiés, décharge (via le Petit lac Masketsi) d'un lac non identifié.

"Tawachiche West River" in Batiscanie, in Quebec

The Tawachiche West River is in the Municipality of Lac-aux-Sables. Its mouth is 9.5 kilometres (5.9 mi) north of the village of Hervey-Jonction), in the administrative region of Mauricie, in the province of Quebec, Canada. Flowing mostly in the Marmier (township), its watershed is part of the Batiscanie, in the area of the MRC Mékinac. The river flows from north-west to south-east to empty into the Tawachiche River. Tawachiche West River is entirely in forest areas. The surface of the river is usually frozen from November to April. Annually, the river flow is high during the spring thaw.

Since the 18th century, logging was a major economic factor in this wilderness area. Nowadays, camping, resorts and outdoor activities are dominant: hunting, fishing, hiking or all-terrain vehicle riding, snowmobiling, and boating.

== Geography ==
The mouth of the Tawachiche West River is near the reception office of the ZEC Tawachiche. The mouth is 5.8 kilometres (3.6 mi) from "Lake à l'Auguste", 8.4 kilometres (5.2 mi) from the dam of "Little Lake Masketsi", 8.6 kilometres (5.3 mi) from the dam of "Lac Profond" (Deep Lake), 8.6 kilometres (5.3 mi) from the dam of Lake Terrien and 8.7 kilometres (5.4 mi) from Lake Missionary. The mouth is 0.8 kilometres (0.50 mi) from the former Audy railway station and 1.6 kilometres (0.99 mi) from site of the former sawmill Veillet & Frères Ltée, located downstream on the banks of the Tawachiche River.

The Tawachiche West River begins at the mouth of Lake Masketsi (Mékinac), which flows into the Little Lake Masketsi. The outlet of the latter empties into Lake Auguste. In its course, the river on its left bank catches the discharges of "Boileau Lake" and "Vieillotte Lake".

From the mouth (near the former Audy railway station), up the stream, the road Tawachiche west generally follows the whole course of the Tawachiche West River. Upwards towards the northwest, the road passes near the "lake à l'Auguste", the "little lake Masketsi", Lake Masketsi (Mékinac) (where it bifurcates near the mouth and moves northward between lakes Masketsi and Roberge), Lake Roberge (it runs along the west side of the lake), Lake Narcisse and Lake Faber.

After crossing the lake Faber, Tawachiche west road meets a junction that connects the road Tawachiche is up to the Lake Price. This branch passes near lakes Calau (connected to Lake Suève), Welch, Puce, Lefebvre and "Lake à Mousse".

== See also ==
- Batiscanie
- Marmier (township)
- Zec Tawachiche
- Village of Hervey-Jonction

Municipalities:

- Lac-aux-Sables
- Sainte-Thècle
- Unorganized territory of Lac-Masketsi, Quebec

ZEC, Wildlife Sanctuary and parks:

- Portneuf Wildlife Reserve

Rivers:

- Rivière des Envies
- Tawachiche River
- Batiscan River

RCM / MRC (in French):

- Mékinac Regional County Municipality
