= Tawachiche River =

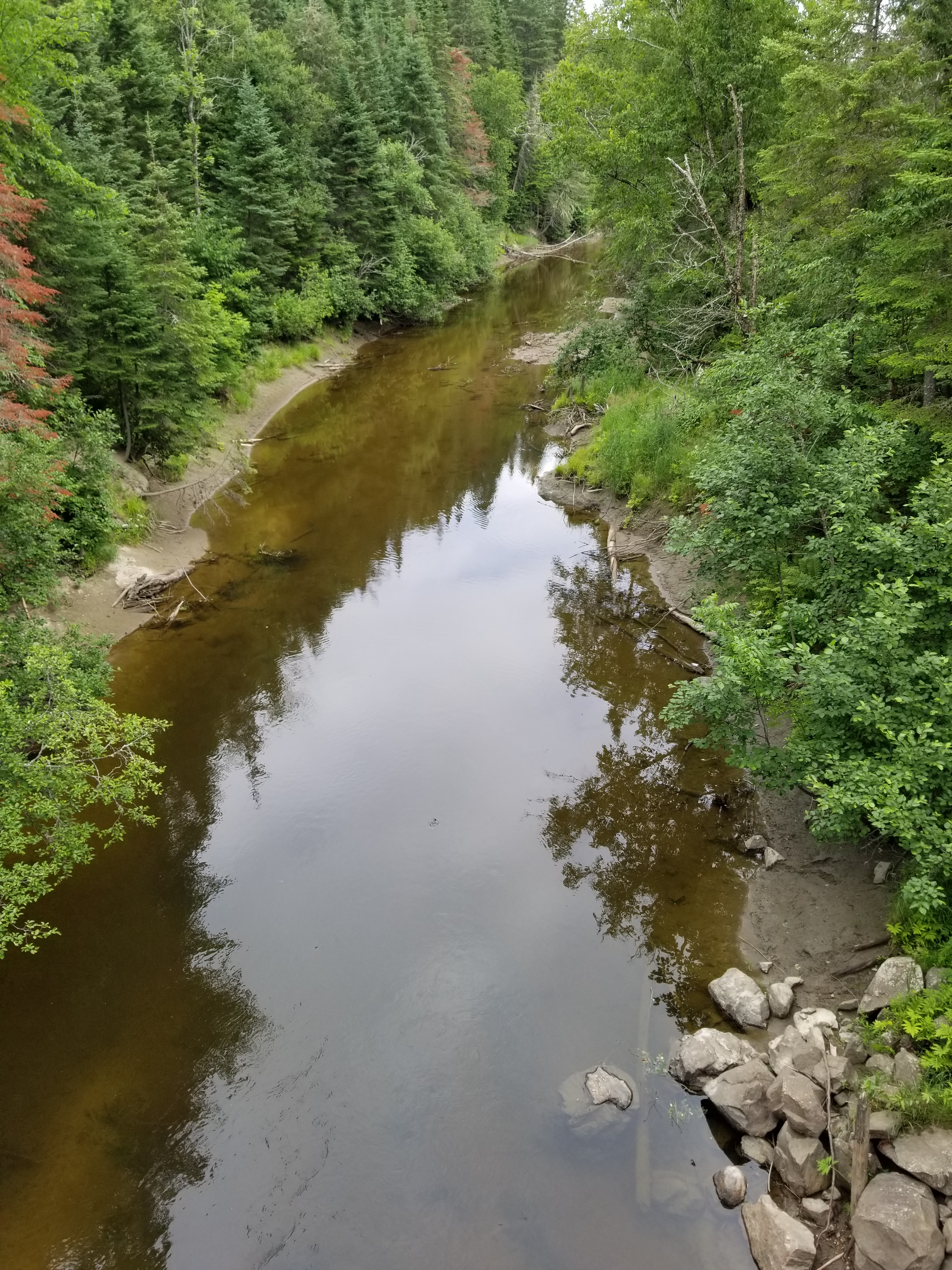
- Tawachiche River, seen upstream from the road bridge of Saint-Alphonse Road (almost at the limit of Sainte-Thècle) and 0.5 km from the confluence of this river with the Batiscan River.

- Location in Quebec

Location
- Country: Canada
- Province: Quebec
- Region: Mauricie
- Regional County Municipality: Mékinac Regional County Municipality
- Municipality: Lac-aux-Sables and Sainte-Thècle

Physical characteristics
- Source: Lac à l'Orignal (Moose lake)
  - coordinates: 47°01′30″N 72°28′30″W
  - elevation: 379 m (1,243 ft)
- Mouth: Batiscan River
  - location: Lac-aux-Sables, Quebec
  - coordinates: 46°49′39″N 72°26′09″W
  - elevation: 109 m (358 ft)
- Length: 25 km (16 mi)
- Basin size: 196 km^{2} (76 sq mi)

Basin features
- Tributaries
  - left: (Upward from the mouth) Unidentified stream coming from rang Saint-Alphonse, unidentified stream, discharge of an unidentified lake, discharge of two little lakes, ruisseau Gagnon, discharge (through Therrien Lake) of three lakes (including Kessi Lake, discharge of a set of lakes (such Fontaine Lake), discharge of a set of lakes (such "du midi" and "de la Montagne"), discharge (through Price Lake) of an unidentified lake, discharge (through Price Lake) of an unidentified lake.
  - right: (Upward from the mouth) Unidentified stream from rang Saint-Thomas, unidentified stream coming from rang Saint-Georges, discharge of a little and unidentified lake, discharge of a little and unidentified lake, unidentified stream, discharge of two unidentified lake, Tawachiche West River, discharge of two little lakes, discharge of five little lakes, discharge of an unidentified lake, discharge of Buffon Lake and Lac du Milieu.

The Tawachiche River (French pronunciation: [tawaʃiʃ]) flows from north to south for 25 kilometres (16 mi) entirely in the territory of the Municipality of Lac-aux-Sables, in Mékinac Regional County Municipality, in Mauricie, in the province of Quebec, Canada.

== Geography ==
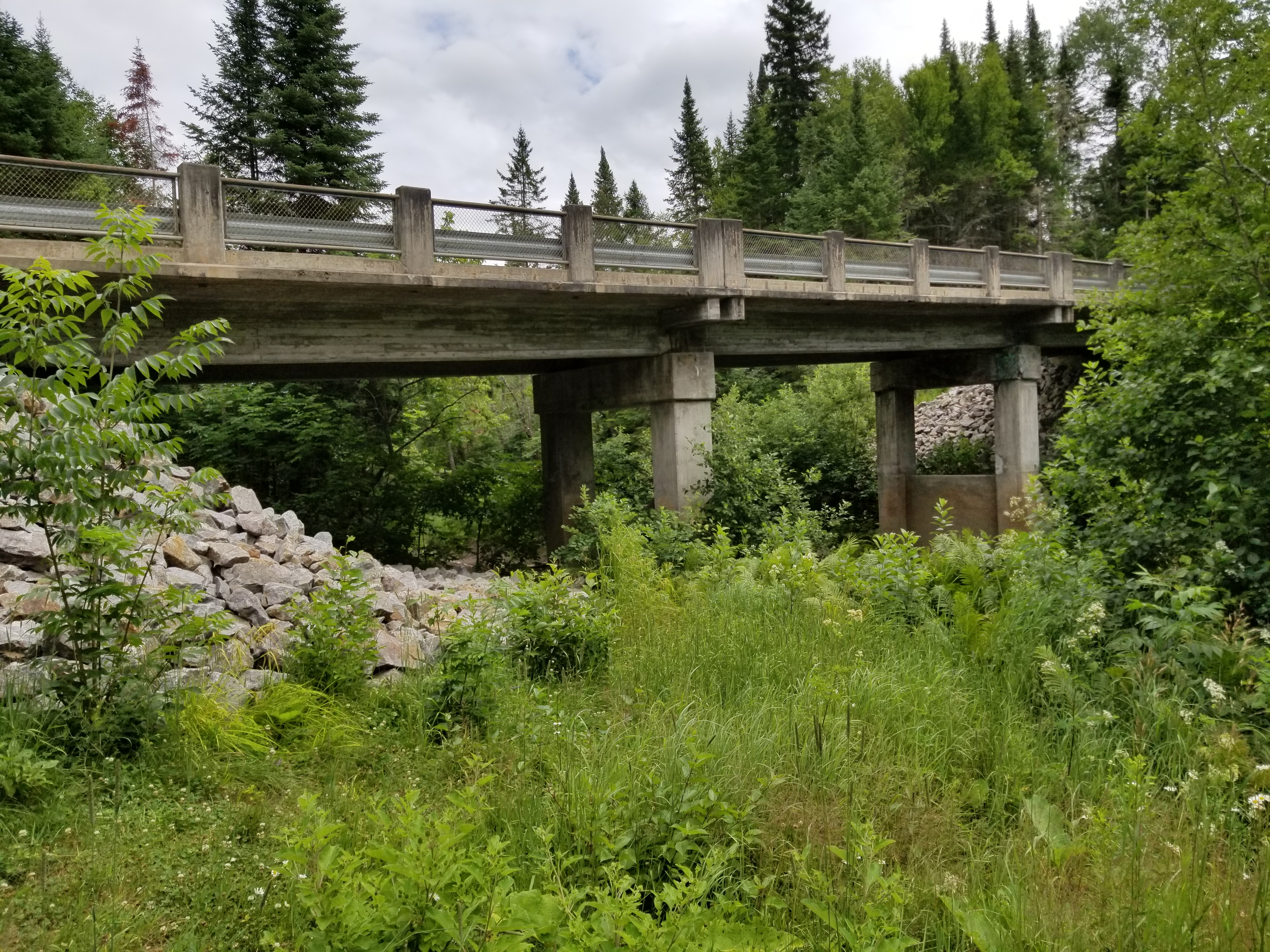
Saint-Alphonse Road Bridge (Lac-aux-Sables) spanning the Tawachiche River 0.5 km from its mouth.

The Tawachiche River watershed covers 196 square kilometres (76 sq mi) and is the ninth largest sub-watershed in the Batiscanie.

River Tawachiche pass through a single village, Hervey-Jonction, then crosses Rang Saint-Charles and empties into the Batiscan River (which forms a sharp bend at this point), at the limit Sainte-Thècle and Lac-aux-Sables. Its main tributary, the Tawachiche West River, flows into Tawachiche river at about 13 kilometres (8.1 mi) from its mouth (in Audy sector, at the boundary of Zec Tawachiche).

== Upper water bodies ==
The "Lac à l'Orignal" (Moose Lake) (elevation: 379 m) is the upper lake of the Tawachiche River in the Marmier (township). This lake is fed from the north by a creek which starts at an unnamed lake (elevation: 420 m; heart shaped); this stream descends westward to "lac Petit" (Lake Petit) (elevation: 377 m; 140 m long and surrounded by marshes); then the stream branches off to the south and crosses four small lakes before flowing into marsh area on the shore north of "lac à l'Orignal" (Moose Lake).

From "lac à l'Orignal" (elevation: 379 m), the Tawachiche River flows south through lakes: Price (elevation: 375 m; in marsh area), "Petit lac Begin" (Small Begin lake) (elevation: 359 m), Bégin Lake (altitude 347 m), Germain Lake (elevation: 338 m), "Lac Profond" (Deep Lake) (elevation: 272 m) and the Terrien lake (altitude 263 m). This lake is the largest body of water in this river sub-catchment. From the discharge of the latter lake, the river flows south-west.

Down, the river quenches including lake "du Milieu" (Middle lake), Boiteau and Buffon. The Tawachiche river is also fed by the outlet of Fontaine lake.

While the Tawachiche West River is fed by lakes Masketsi, Little Masketsi and Roberge, located in the non organized territory of the Lac-Masketsi.

All the headwaters of the river is located in the Tawachiche Zec Tawachiche which is the main watershed. Lake Masketsi (4.0 square kilometres (1.5 sq mi)) is the largest lake in this sub-watershed (river Tawachiche) of the Regional Development Plan and Integrated Resource (PRDIRT).

== Lower part ==
This watershed includes part of rang St-Georges (north) and rang St-Thomas (north) in Sainte-Thècle.

On nearly all the way, this river flows in forested areas. Although the river flows through agricultural areas, from about a mile above the village of Hervey-Jonction to its mouth, each bank maintains a wooded strip, of a width generally ranging from 50 to 100 meters.

Northeast of Hervey-Jonction, after passing under the bridge of the Route 153, the river flows through a beautiful waterfall cascades which inflates in March and April due to snowmelt. The surface of the Tawachiche river is usually frozen from November to April, allowing the construction of roads ice for transport to the lumber camps before the construction of a motorable road on the side of the river. This ice road was used greatly during the Indian prehistory and pioneers in the settlement.

== Road and railway course ==
From the village of Hervey-Jonction, going back to the north, the "Lac-en-Coeur" road (Road of lake in form of Heart) leads directly to the lake of the same name (located 2.0 km from Hervey-Jonction). Then the road turns to the right (north) at 1.6 km from Hervey-Jonction and becomes the Tawachiche road, which crosses the railway line Hervey-Jonction – La Tuque (at 1.7 km from the intersection of "Lac-en-coeur" Road). Shortly after crossing the railway, the road crosses Tawachiche river. Then the railway and the Tawachiche road follow a similar path up towards the north near the Tawachiche river.

In sector Audy (near the mouth of the Tawachiche West River), the railway forks (9.1 km from Hervey-Jonction) to the north-west, parallel to the path of the Tawachiche West River. All the way from Hervey-Jonction, the railway stay on the right bank of the Tawachiche West River and Tawachiche river. And 20.6 km from Hervey-Jonction, the railway skirts the "petit lac Masketsi" by the northeast, continues along the Lake Masketsi along its length (east side), and passes through sector Gouin, located on the lake. At some points, the journey by rail area encroaches on the lake.

Several cottages are built surrounding the Tawachiche river, including several in the Audy (which has several small streets), the area of the falls in the village of Hervey-Jonction, and in the area between Hervey-Jonction and the mouth of the river. Audy sector offers various services to visitors including a relay, lodging, rental cabins, camping, the docking station of the Zec Tawachiche, etc.

== Major bridges ==
The main bridges over the Tawachiche river, from the mouth are:

• A bridge linking the St-Thomas North road (Sainte-Thècle) and Saint-Alphonse road (Lac-aux-Sables), is located at 0.5 km upstream of the mouth of Tawachiche river. This bridge is close to a second bridge (located a few hundred metres southeast of the first). This second bridge spans a small river which becomes a tributary of the right bank of Tawachiche few hundred meters below. The road from St Georges Road (Lac-aux-Sables) ends between the two bridges. This area is designated Pee-Wee.

• Road Bridge on Route 153 (chemin Saint-Charles), located at the northern end of the village of Hervey-Jonction (near golf course) or 5.5 km by water from the mouth (or 4 km in a direct line, because the sinuosity of the river Tawachiche). This bridge is located upstream of a large drop, which is located near the site of the second station- Hervey-Jonction. The new railway station is now located in front of the chapelle of the village.

• Bridge Railway of the Canadian National (formerly Grand Trunk Railway), on the railway line between Hervey-Jonction and Lac Saint-Jean. The iron bridge is located 0.4 km upstream of the bridge on Route 153.

• Pedestrian Bridge in the second sawmill Veillette & Frères Ltée, built 500 meters north of Hervey-Jonction, upstream of the railway bridge. This mill was built in the fall of 1933 and was operated until 1941. It was demolished in 1946.

• First road bridge Tawachiche the way, leading to the docking station (sector Audy) of Zec Tawachiche. This bridge is located 1.8 km from the intersection of "Lac en coeur" road. After the bridge, the road up the river on the left bank.

• Second Tawachiche Road flyover, located 5.9 km from the intersection of "Route du lac en coeur", leading to the docking station (sector Audy) of Zec Tawachiche. After the bridge, the road up the river on the right bank.

• Third Path Tawachiche road bridge in the Audy (Audy near the station), 7 km from the intersection of "Lac en coeur" road. The bridge spans the Tawachiche West River, the main tributary of the river Tawachiche. Before crossing the bridge, the path splits into two Tawachiche branches Tawachiche the road which runs west to Lake Masketsi (north-west) on the right bank of the river and the road Tawachiche East, which continues north-east up the river Tawachiche on the right side for a few miles.

• Fourth Road Bridge Tawachiche Road East, built near Lake Pollack, approximately 2.3 km upstream of the bridge of Tawachiche West River. After crossing the bridge, the path Tawachiche East goes north-east on the left bank.

== Main Basin dams ==
The first dams built at the mouth of Lake watershed rivers Tawachiche, Tawachiche Tawachiche West and East, served from 1933 to regularize the flow (especially during floods) and the water level in order to promote timber transport by flotation. Since the 1950s, dams lakes at the mouth promote water activities. Major dams in this sub-basin are:

Main dams on watershed of river Tawachiche-West
Dam	Distance of Audy's railway station	Longitude	Latitude	Notes
Calau	18.4 km	-72.499380303°	47.039225725°	located at 0.4 km from Welch lake
Suève-1	18.7 km	-72.491324102°	47.045336775°	located at the mouth of Suève lake.
Suève-2	18.9 km	-72.491324102°	47.045336775°	located at 0,2 km from Suève-1 dam, at the mouth of Suève lake.
Petit-Lac-Masketsi	7.5 km	-72.53611	46.97194	located at the mouth of "Petit lac Masketsi" (Little Masketsi lake). This dam belongs to Quebec gouvernement. The "petit lac Masketsi" empties into river Tawachiche-West.
Lac Masketsi	9.5 km	-72.55417	46.99944	This dam was built at the mouth of Masketsi lake in Fall 1933 by Veillette & Frères Ltée in order to regulate the water flow for the first Tawachiche sawmill. Now, this dam is owned by the Quebec government. The outlet of Lake Masketsi is located on the route of the river Tawachiche-West. Native Masketsi designation means "moccasin".

== Saw Mill "Veillette & Frères" at Audy ==
A saw mill, owned by the forester contractor Théotime Massicotte, living in Sainte-Thècle, was built between the railway and the river Tawachiche, less than a mile south of the small Audy railway station. The saw mill was approximately eight kilometers north of the village of Hervey-Jonction. This mill was sold to Frank Blais, forest contractor and merchant living in Sainte-Thècle, who had operated a store in the early 20th century at the village the station (Notre-Dame street), Sainte-Thècle. In 1922, Frank Blais sells this small sawmill in Audy, powered by steam, to the company "Veillet & Frères Ltée" (Veillet & Brothers Ltd). The company made minor additions to this mill.

Founded in 1920 by four brothers Jeffrey, Freddy, Alphée and Wilson Veillet of Sainte-Thècle, Veillette & Brothers company Limited acquires rights of cutting hardwood, in 1922, in the north of Hervey-Jonction, in the area of Tawachiche river, around Audy, along the rail road leading to La Tuque.

This mill was operated about 16 years until about 1934. From the beginning, the mill assured employment to 22 or 25 men assigned to sawing wood, the drave, the stacking and transportation, and also a hundred woodcutters in the forest. Contracts cutting wood in the forest were usually granted to designated contractors including: Wellie Charest, Armand Plamondon, Josaphat Veillet and Bruno Veillet.

Depending on demand, the wood was sawn into planks, boards, wooden construction, railway sleepers, or boards (1.25 inch to 2.5 inch) for the textile manufacturers which were transformed into spindles.

The combustion chamber of the steam engine boiler was powered by mill sawdust. In the courtyard, the boards were stacked in individual cages up to a height of six meters, thus using all the free space of the courtyard around the mill. This Audy mill ceased its activities in 1934, to be replaced by the new mill built by Veillet in autumn 1933, at around 500 meters north of Hervey-Jonction and operational in spring 1934.

== Saw Mill of "Veillette & Brothers" in Hervey-Jonction ==
The second sawmill of "Veillette & Frères Ltée" was built in the fall of 1933, on the right banks of the river Tawachiche, at 500 meters North of the village of Hervey-Jonction. The mill went into operation in the spring of 1934, concurrently with the closing of the sawmill in Audy. In Fall 1933, the company Veillette & Frères Ltée has built dams on various water bodies and lakes in Tawachiche area, including Terrien lake and Masketsi lake in order to control the flow and water level on the river Tawachiche, and Tawachiche West for the transportation of the logs by flotation.

A dam was built on the river next to the sawmill Tawachiche (near Hervey-Jonction), in order to retain water and facilitate the floating of logs to the landing installed at the top of the dam. At the beginning of this sawmill, the company used 12 feet logs, to be cut by the sawmill in "pitoune" of four feet long each. Then a slab brought the pitounes 75 feet higher to the docks of railway wagons (parked on side line). Three railroad cars could be loaded at the same time, by man's muscle and wielding hooks. Finally, with the democratization of mechanical chain saws, used manually in the forest by worker, it was easier to cut each log in four feet in length, directly on cutting site, before transportation by truck.

The sawmill ceased its operations in 1941, as the wood was then transported by truck directly from seater cutting to paper mill in Grand-Mère or Shawinigan. This sawmill was demolished in 1946.

== Main attractions ==
- The Zec Tawachiche has 128 lakes (of which 72 are used for fishing) and four rivers in an area of 318 km^{2}. ZEC offers vacationers and nature lovers a variety of attractions and activities accessible by car: hunting, fishing, rustic camping, canoe camping, stay in cabins, hiking trails ... The area also allows you to drive ATV or snowmobile, depending on the season. Visitors can indulge in the observation of nature, flora, fauna and landscapes. The main entrance of ZEC is located near the mouth of the Tawachiche West River in the sector Audy station, 9.1 km from the intersection of the route 153 to the village's Hervey-Jonction. The second entry into the territory of the ZEC is located north of the Aux-Eaux-Mortes river, this entry is accessed via the Route 155, and then taking the path of Carignan (Lac-à-Beauce) south of La Tuque. Visitors can also access the territory of the ZEC in which seaplanes landing is possible on the lakes Masketsi, Roberge, "à l'Ours" (the Bear) and Hackett. The two main rivers: the Tawachiche and its tributary the Tawachiche west whose mouth is located in the Audy area near the main entrance of the ZEC.
- Tawachiche cliff climbing site, located on the western shore of Lake Therrien. Since 2009, climbing enthusiasts frequent this granite cliff overlooking a bog and lake Therrien. In many places, the cliff has sustained over 50 m vertical, with some sequences of about 100 m. A boat is required to reach the foot of the cliff whose orientation is south, southeast, which allows them to climb from March to November. Cape Tawachiche inherited a Native American legend that transcends in the names of the five sectors of the cliff: Tomahawk (sections Shaman, Great Horned Owl, Totem), Indian summer, Attimakekw, Wometaci and Maskwaaskwaaskwa. Therrien lake is located 15 minutes drive from the entrance to the Zec Tawachiche, taking the path of Tawachiche (East section).
- Holiday Camp in Lac-en-Coeur, in operation since 1946, offers stays with educational activities to youth. This site is located 2.2 km north of the Hervey-Jonction's village. The camp is administered by the corporation "The Villages Students inc." The abbots Charles-Henri Lapointe and Paul Boivin (first Director General of the camp) had initiated this great project with many local volunteers. Initially, religious education was shading. The story is divided into three episodes: the period of youth Catholic Students (YCS) from 1946 to 1968, the period Landry Center from 1968 to 1974 and from 1974 until the camp today.

== See also ==
Media related to Category:Tawachiche river at Wikimedia Commons

- Mékinac Regional County Municipality
- Zec Tawachiche
- Tawachiche West River
- Batiscan River
- Batiscanie
- Lac-aux-Sables
- Hervey-Jonction
- Sainte-Thècle
- List of rivers of Quebec
