= Lac-Lapeyrère =

- Unorganized territory
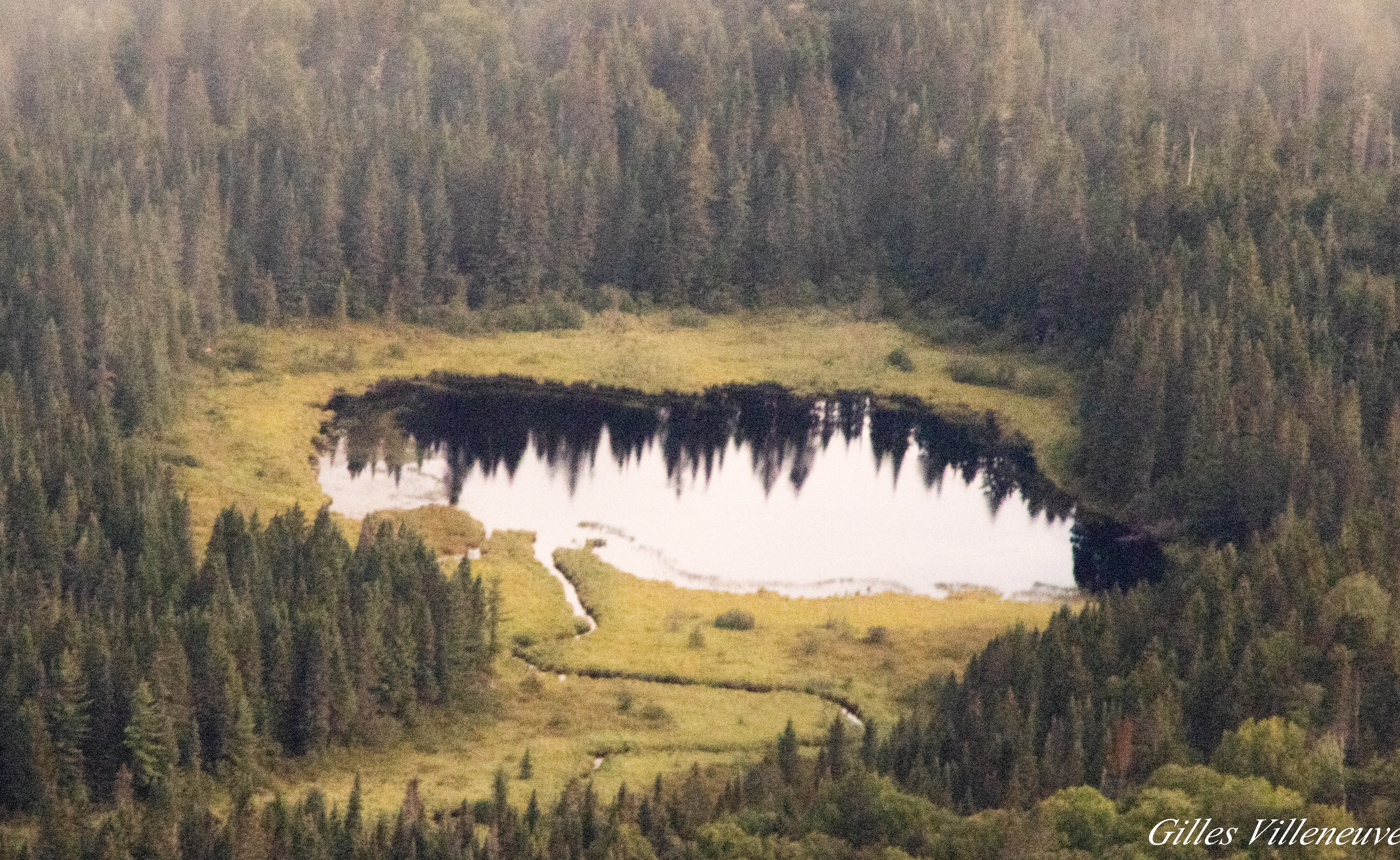
- The namesake lake, 2019

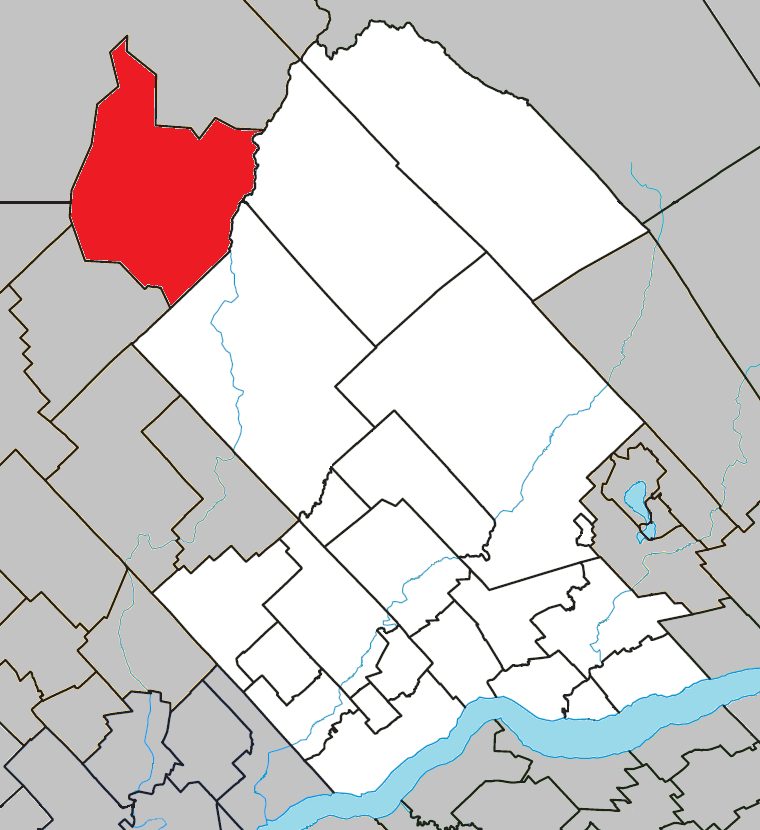
- Location within Portneuf RCM

- Location in central Quebec
- Coordinates: 47°13′00″N 72°22′00″W
- Country: Canada
- Province: Quebec
- Region: Capitale-Nationale
- RCM: Portneuf
- Constituted: January 1, 1986

Government
  - Fed. riding: Saint-Augustin—Portneuf—Jacques-Cartier
  - Prov. riding: Portneuf

Area
  - Total: 400.79 km^{2} (154.75 sq mi)
  - Land: 376.66 km^{2} (145.43 sq mi)

Population (2021)
  - Total: 0
  - Density: 0/km^{2} (0/sq mi)
  - Pop (2016-21): 0.0%
  - Dwellings: 0
- Time zone: UTC−5 (EST)
  - Summer (DST): UTC−4 (EDT)
- Highways: No major routes

Lac-Lapeyrère (French pronunciation: [lak lapeʁɛʁ]) is an unorganized territory, part of Portneuf Regional County Municipality in Quebec, Canada. The RCM is included in the administrative region of the Capitale-Nationale. This area of the north shore of St. Lawrence River and the west bank of the Batiscan River is located about 75 kilometres (47 mi) northeast of Shawinigan. The unorganized territory Lac-Lapeyrère includes the geographic Lapeyrère Township, which was established in 1907, and is entirely within the Portneuf Wildlife Reserve.

The territory has several major water bodies including lakes Garneau, Travers, Robinson, Casgrain, Tage and Lapeyrère, and is drained to the east by the Batiscan River.

Lac-Lapeyrère unorganized territory was legally constituted on January 1, 1986, and has a total area of 400.79 square kilometres (154.75 sq mi). There are no permanent inhabitants on the territory.

== Toponymy ==
Three homonyms using "Lapeyrère" exist: Lac-Lapeyrère (unorganized territory), Lake Lapeyrère, and the Township Lapeyrère. Located in the north of the township of Lapeyrère, the lake is the largest in this unorganized territory.

The designation of these three homonyms refers to a passage in Quebec in 1906 of the French cruiser Tage, commanded by Augustin Boué de Lapeyrère (1852-1924), who became vice-admiral in 1908 and French Minister of Marine 1909 to 1911. Lapeyrère became commander in chief ally in the Mediterranean in 1914 and organized the blockade of the Austro-Hungarian fleet in the Adriatic.

The name "Lac-Lapeyrère" (unorganized territory) was formalized on March 13, 1986, in the register of the names of places in the Commission de toponymie du Québec (Geographical Names Board of Québec).

== Demographics ==
Historical census populations – Lac-Lapeyrère
Year	Pop.	±%
1996	0	—
2001	0	0.00%
2006	0	0.00%
2011	0	0.00%
2016	0	0.00%
2021	0	0.00%
Source: Statistics Canada

== See also ==
- Batiscanie
- Rivière-à-Pierre
- Serpentine River (Québec)
- La Tuque, Quebec
- Linton, Quebec (unincorporated territory)
- Lac-Masketsi, Quebec (unincorporated territory)
