= Lake Masketsi =

- Location within Quebec
- Location: Quebec in Canada
- Coordinates: 46°59′58″N 72°33′15″W
- Type: natural
- Primary outflows: Petit lac Masketsi which empties into Tawachiche West River
- Basin countries: Canada
- Max. length: 4.4 km (2.7 mi)
- Max. width: 1.8 km (1.1 mi)
- Surface elevation: 231 m (758 ft)

The Lake Masketsi is located in the unorganized territory of Lac-Masketsi, in the Mekinac Regional County Municipality, in Mauricie, in Quebec, in Canada.

== Geography ==
Masketsi lake has a maximum length of 4.4 km in the north–south axis. Its shape has a bulge in the far north and also the extreme south. Its width is 1.8 km in the north, 0.6 km from the center and 1.5 km in the southern part. Landfill located in the southeastern part of the lake empties after 500 meters further south in the "Little Lake-Masketsi". The latter lake oval has a length of 600 meters. The head of the Tawachiche West River has its source in Lake Masketsi. Masketsi Lake and Little Lake-Masketsi, each comprise a dam at their mouths, for the purpose of resort and recrotouristics activities. At Lake Masketsi, the dam has a height of 4.2 m. and a retention height of 2.7 m. The dam has a length of 70.2 m. and a holding capacity of 11,466,000 m³. It is a type of dam class C, free rockfill weir on land foundation "till". The reservoir surface area is 420 ha and the catchment area is 52 km^{2}. The dam was originally built in 1909, at the time of the construction of the railway along the lake. The dam was modified in 2008.

The dam downstream is the one of "Little lake Masketsi" which was built initially in 1921 for the operation of Audy sawmill, north of Hervey-Jonction. This little dam is 22,7 m in length and a height of 1,7 m. The retention capacity is 215 000 m³, creating a reservoir of 21,5 ha. This dam has a free rockfill weir.

Entire eastern half of the Masketsi lake is bordered since 1909 by railway of the Canadian National Railway, which connects Hervey-Jonction to La Tuque. The east side of the lake has mountains that required extensive blasting during construction of the railway. Two small railway stations, called "Gouin" and "Lac-Masketsi" (northern part of the lake), were located on the east side of the lake, and separated of few kilometers.

== Toponymy ==
Surveyor Eugène Taché was mention of this place name on a map of the province of Quebec from 1870. The Native American word meaning "moccasin".

The name "Lake Masketsi" was officially registered on December 5, 1968, at the Commission de toponymie du Québec (Geographical Names Board of Québec)

== Related Items ==
- Mekinac Regional County Municipality
- Lac-Masketsi, unorganized territory
- Batiscanie, Quebec
- Trois-Rives, municipality
- Lac-aux-Sables, municipality
- Zec Tawachiche
- Lejeune Township
- Mauricie
- Tawachiche River
- Tawachiche West River
