= Portneuf Wildlife Reserve =

Wildlife reserve in Quebec, Canada

- Location within Quebec
- Location: Portneuf, Quebec, Canada
- Nearest city: Quebec
- Coordinates: 47°09′00″N 72°17′00″W
- Area: 774 km^{2} (299 sq mi)
- Established: 1968
- Website: www.sepaq.com/rf/por/index.dot?language_id=1

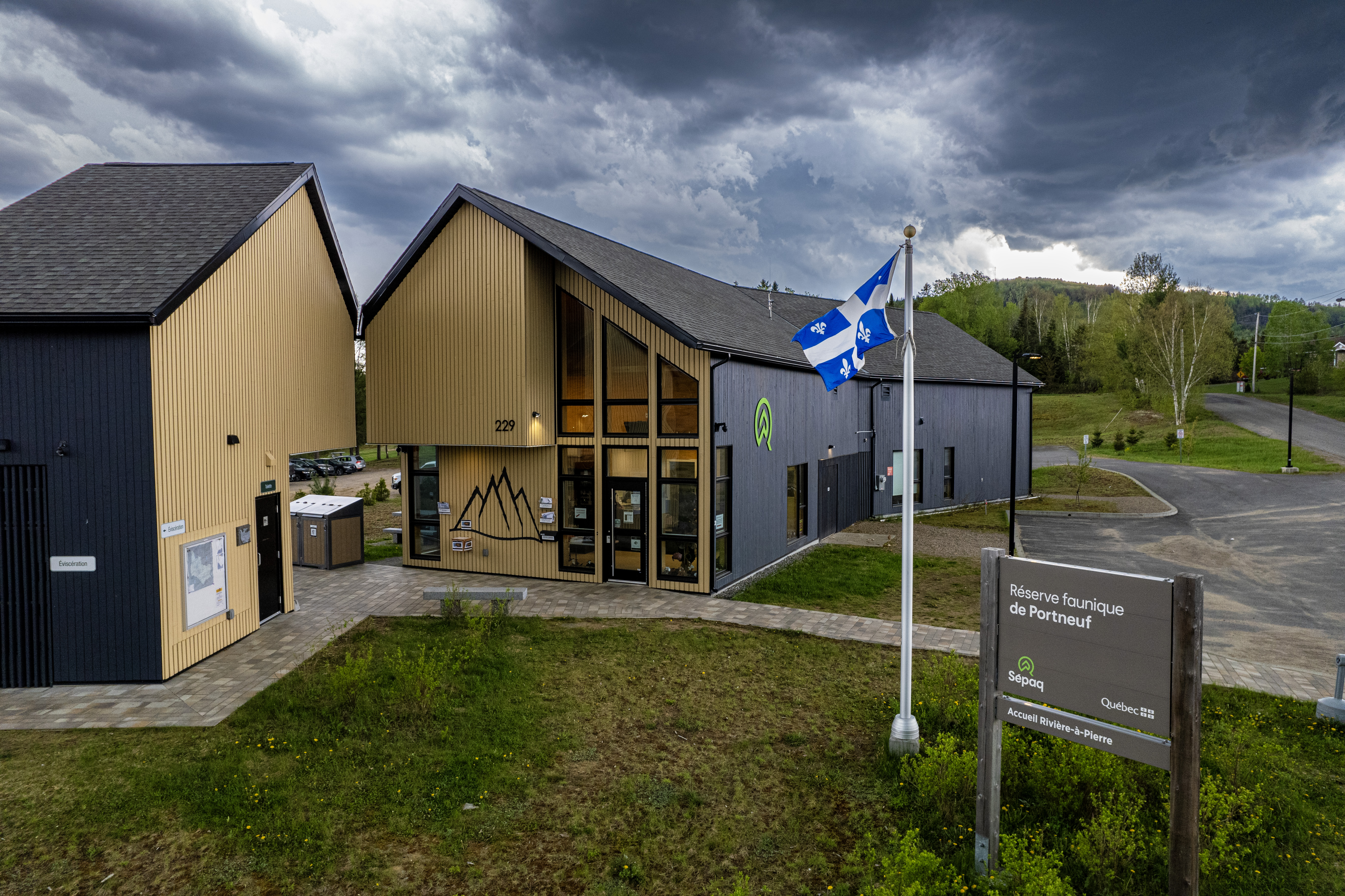
Reception building of the Portneuf Wildlife Reserve in Rivière-à-Pierre.

The Portneuf Wildlife Reserve is located in the province of Quebec (Canada), in the western part of the Capitale-Nationale region. This wildlife reserve is administered by SEPAQ.

== See also ==
- Island of the Cross (Quebec)
- Jeannotte River
- Batiscan River
- Batiscanie
- Municipality of Rivière-à-Pierre
- Zec Tawachiche
