= Zec Tawachiche =

- Location within Quebec
- Location: Lac-aux-Sables and in non-organized territories of Lac-Masketsi and Lac-Lapeyrère; in the Mékinac Regional County Municipality, in Québec, Canada
- Nearest city: Saint-Tite
- Coordinates: 47°02′00″N 72°30′00″W
- Area: 318 square kilometres (123 sq mi)
- Established: 1978
- Governing body: Association de chasse, pêche et villégiature Tawachiche inc. (Association of hunting, fishing and resort Tawachiche inc).

The zec Tawachiche is a zone d'exploitation contrôlée (controlled harvesting zone) (zec) covering 318 km^{2}, of which 310 km^{2} are located in Mékinac Regional County Municipality, in Mauricie, in the province of Quebec, in Canada. This zec is mainly located in the municipality of Lac-aux-Sables and in the non-organized territories of Lac-Masketsi and Lac-Lapeyrère. The zec territory is situated north of Sainte-Thècle and Saint-Tite. Located approximately 80 km north of Trois-Rivières, it is bordered to the east by Portneuf Wildlife Reserve.

The main entrance to the zec Tawachiche is located near the mouth of the Tawachiche West River in the Audy Station, 9.1 km from the intersection of the road 153 in the village of Hervey-Jonction, Quebec. The second entry into the territory of the zec is located north of the rivière aux eaux mortes; previously, it was located at the Milieu River. This entry is accessible via the Road 155 and taking the path of Carignan (Lac-à-Beauce), south of La Tuque. Visitors can also access the Zec territory in which seaplanes landing is possible on the lakes Masketsi, Roberge, the Bear and Hackett.

The Association de chasse, pêche et villégiature Tawachiche inc. (Association of hunting, fishing and vacations Tawachiche Inc.) was granted the authority to administer the zec at its inception in 1978.

== Geography ==
About half of the territory (Southern part) of the zec drains in the Batiscanie, Quebec. Northern part of the zec drains in Mékinac River. Zec Tawachiche has 128 lakes (of which 72 are used for fishing) and four rivers in an area of 318 km^{2} (123 sq mi). The vast majority of these lakes are accessible by car. Three lakes are reserved for fly fishing. The zec offers vacationers and nature lovers a variety of attractions and activities: hunting, fishing, rustic camping, canoe camping, stay in a cottage, hiking trails... The area can also circulate ATV or snowmobile, depending on the season. Visitors can indulge in the observation of nature, flora, fauna and landscapes. The zec is located in the fishing area number 26.

Rail line Hervey-Jonction to Senneterre (Abitibi) via La Tuque, through the zec Tawachiche. Via Rail allows visitors to take the train or stand at various stops on the territory of the zec.

The main rivers are:

- Southern area of the zec: Tawachiche and its tributary the West Tawachiche whose mouth is located in the Audy, near the main entrance of the zec;
- Northern area of the zec: Rivière du milieu (Mékinac) and Rivière aux eaux mortes (Mékinac).

== Accommodations ==
In 1978, the administration of the zec was entrusted to the "Association of hunting, fishing and resort Tawachiche inc" (Association de chasse, pêche et villégiature Tawachiche inc). Annually, the recording desk of the zec Tawachiche open at the end of April and close at the end of October. In May and June, recording hours are from 6:00 to 22:00; July to October from 7:00 to 21:00. Visitors can get at the zec various items such as worms, ice, hunting licenses, fishing and trapping. Users can also rent boats and motors. Hunters can use the government registration service for the big animals.

There are launching ramps on four large lakes. In order to accommodate its sailors and vacationers, the zec offers a rental service for boats, motor and sale of various items. Visitors may use outboard motors under 10 forces only on the lakes Roberge, "à l'ours" (Bear lake), Masketsi and chain of lakes Hackett.

Several utilities are available outside the zec in villages Hervey-Jonction, Lac-aux-Sables and Sainte-Thècle as convenience stores, gas stations, grocery stores, pharmacies, car garages... CLSC Saint-Tite is located 26 km from the main entrance of zecTawachiche.

== Main attractions ==
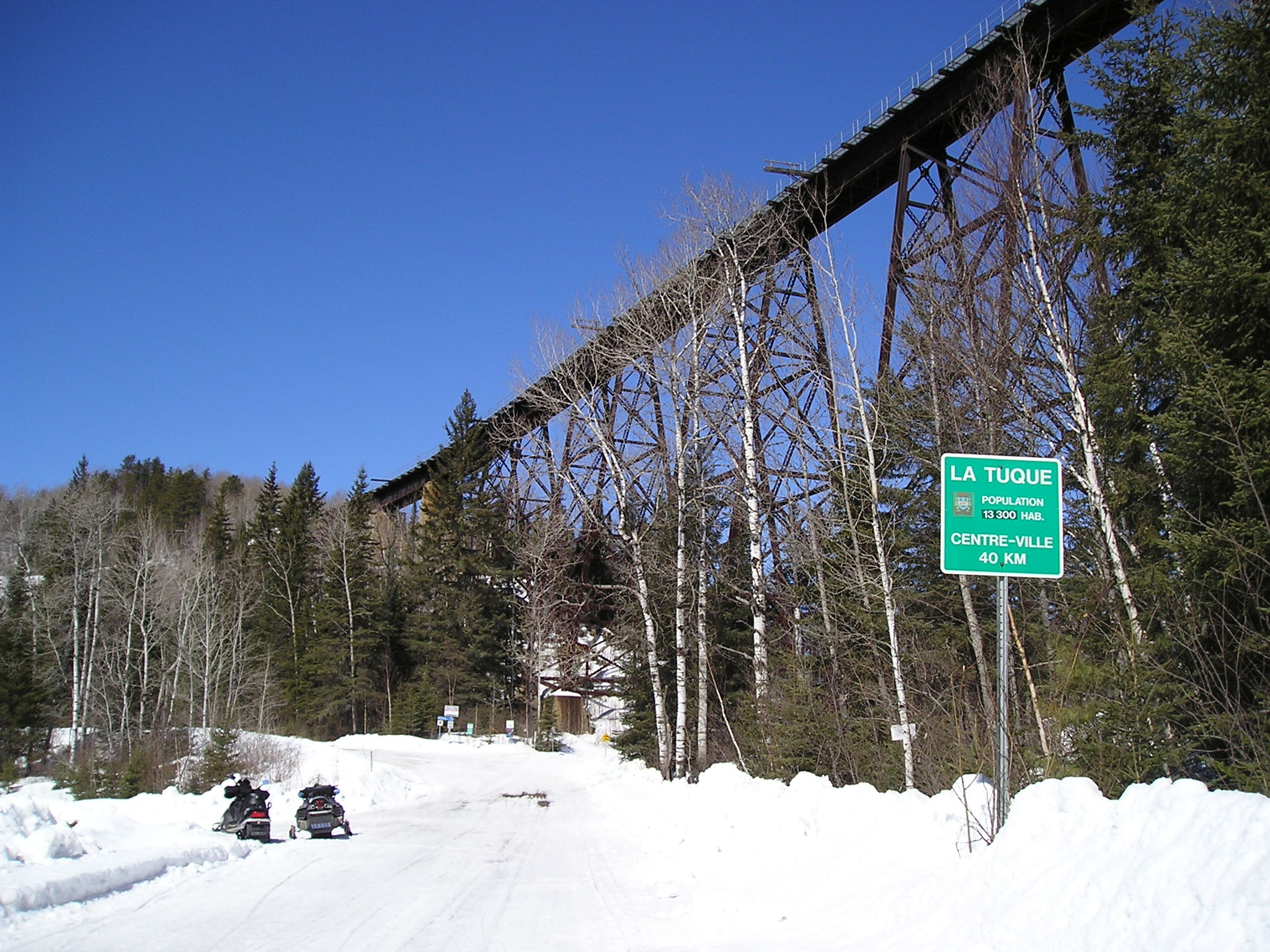
Tracel (railway bridge) of the Rivière-du-Milieu, in the northwestern part of the Zec Tawachiche, in Mauricie, Quebec, Canada

Many species of fish live in the waters of the zec Tawachiche include: brook trout (speckled), trout (lake trout), the splake, smallmouth bass and muskellunge. Fishing activities are subject to quotas.

Followers of observation of nature will love the area for aquatic birds, located in a wetland on the "Rivière à l'eau morte" (Dead Water River). This area attracts a lot of mooses.

In the territory of the zec, hunting is possible for a variety of animals including moose, bear, deer, wolf, fox, partridge, hare, ruffed grouse, the spruce grouse and migratory birds. The zec is located in the hunting area is number 26. Hunting is subject to quotas and selective periods.

Since 2009, climbers frequent the granite cliff overlooking a bog and the western shore of Lake Therrien. In many places, the cliff has a vertical sustained over 50 m, with some sequences of about 100 m. A boat is required to reach the foot of the cliff whose orientation is south, southeast, which allows them to climb from March to November. Cape Tawachiche inherited a Native American legend that transcends in the names of the 5 sectors of the cliff: Tomahawk (sections Shaman, Grand Duke, Totem), Indian Summer, Attimakekw, and Wometaci Maskwaaskwaaskwa. Therrien Lake is located 15 minutes drive from the entrance of the zec, taking the path Tawachiche East.

== Camping and accommodation ==
There are many sites for rustic camping for short stay, or sites for the season. Visitors can also accommodate the numerous chalets or lodges. Outside the zec, users can benefit from several well-equipped campsites, lodges, hotel or motel.

== Toponymy ==
The name "Tawachiche" comes from the Tawachiche River, for which zec Tawachiche is the headwaters. As for the river itself was named after a guide Attikamek named Awachiche that have guided the abbot Severe Dumoulin during a mission in Attikameks of Wemotaci.

The name "zec Tawachiche" was officially registered as place names of the Commission de toponymie du Québec (Geographical Names Board of Quebec) on August 5, 1982.

== See also ==
- Batiscan River
- Batiscanie
- Hervey-Jonction
- Lac-aux-Sables
- Mékinac Regional County Municipality
- Sainte-Thècle
- Tawachiche River
- Tawachiche West River
- Lac-Lapeyrère (unorganized territory)
- Lac-Masketsi (unorganized territory)
- Rivière aux eaux mortes (Mékinac)
- Zone d'exploitation contrôlée (Controlled harvesting zone) (ZEC)
