= Lac-aux-Sables =

- Parish municipality
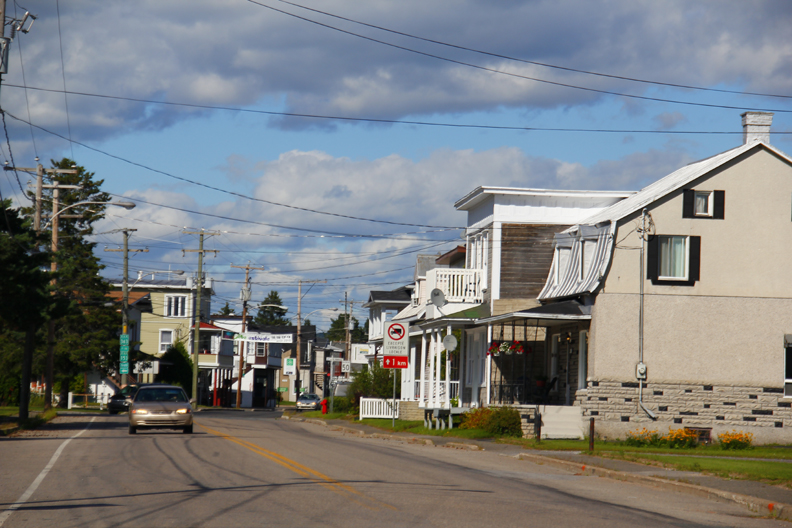
- Main street of Lac-aux-Sables village, August 2013

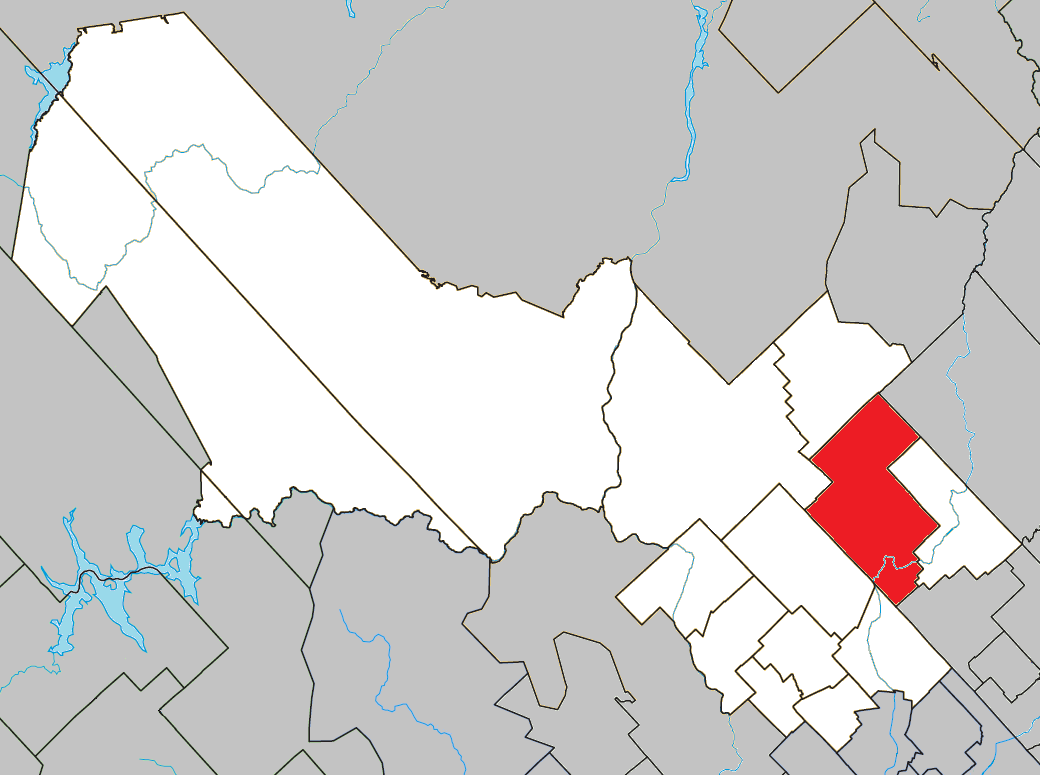
- Location within Mékinac RCM

- Location in central Quebec
- Coordinates: 46°52′N 72°24′W
- Country: Canada
- Province: Quebec
- Region: Mauricie
- RCM: Mékinac
- Settled: 1870s
- Constituted: 24 April 1899
- Named for: Lac aux Sables

Government
  - Mayor: Yvon Bourassa
  - Fed. riding: Saint-Maurice—Champlain
  - Prov. riding: Laviolette

Area
  - Total: 288.66 km^{2} (111.45 sq mi)
  - Land: 269.70 km^{2} (104.13 sq mi)

Population (2021)
  - Total: 1,380
  - Density: 5.1/km^{2} (13/sq mi)
  - Change 2016-21: ▲6.8%
  - Dwellings: 1,157
- Time zone: UTC−5 (EST)
  - Summer (DST): UTC−4 (EDT)
- Postal code(s): G0X 1M0
- Area codes: 418 and 581
- Highways: R-153 R-363
- Website: lac-aux-sables.qc.ca

Lac-aux-Sables (French pronunciation: [lak o sabl]) is a parish municipality in the Mékinac Regional County Municipality (MRC de Mékinac), in administrative district of the Mauricie region of the province of Quebec, Canada. Its population centres are Lac-aux-Sables and Hervey-Jonction.

Since its origins, the sector Hervey-Jonction with 300 inhabitants, is linked to the history of Lac-aux-Sables. Sector Hervey-Jonction is an area dotted with adventure vacation cottages, rivers, lakes and wild forests. On the religious aspect, the Catholic parish St. Leopold d'Hervey-Jonction serves the local population. On the civilian side, the sector is integrated into the municipality of Lac-aux-Sables.

Hervey-Jonction is the location of the Hervey-Jonction Station that is used today as a switching point for two passenger Via Rail trains (Abitibi and Saguenay). Hervey-Jonction railway station was built in 1905 and is now the junction of trains from Montreal to Quebec City, Saguenay-Lac-Saint-Jean, Haut-Saint-Maurice (upper Saint-Maurice region) and Abitibi.

== History ==
The territory of Lac-aux-Sables began to be developed in 1871 with the construction of a road Notre-Dame-des-Anges to Lac-aux-Sables, in order to accommodate farmers from Canton Chavigny (Township). The area began to be settled in the 1880s. The parish of Saint-Rémi of Lac-aux-Sables was canonically erected as of 21 January 1897, and the Municipality of Lac-aux-Sables parish was erected civilly as of 24 April 1899. The territory of Saint-Rémi-du-Lac-aux-Sables was detached from Notre-Dame-des-Anges-de-Montauban, Saint-Casimir and Saint-Ubalde in 1899. The municipality was renamed Lac-aux-Sables in 1983.

In the 21st century, the resort and forestry sectors are the main economic drivers, with agriculture a secondary economic activity. The majority of workers work outside the municipality in forestry, rail, health, and social services.

Services located in Lac-aux-Sables include the post office beginning in 1892, telephone service in 1908, an electric power network since 1925, a waterworks since 1949, the collection of household waste since 1967, a fire protection service since 1967, a planning and municipal development since 1982, a water treatment plant since 1983, and a waste recovery service since 1987.

=== Municipal chronology ===
Before the creation of the municipality of Saint-Rémi du Lac-aux-Sables, the territory was bordered by the municipalities of Notre-Dame-de-Montauban, Saint-Ubalde, and St. Casimir.

- 24 April 1899 (Official Gazette) - Erection Civil municipality of Lac-aux-Sables. This territory belonged to the lordship of Batiscan, and townships Montauban and Chavigny. At the municipal level, this territory has been detached from the municipalities of Notre-Dame-des-Anges, Saint-Ubalde, and Saint-Casimir.
- 1899 - Construction of the public room.
- 1900 - Formation of the first City Council. Jean-Baptiste Darveau was appointed mayor.
- 1900 - Verbalization of the road leading to Lake Huron.
- 1906 - Verbalization of road between Saint-Rémi and Sainte-Thècle.
- 1910 - Start of a network of private aqueduct in the village of Saint-Rémi, made of wooden pipes.
- 30 July 1919 - Separation of some lots which will be awarded to the new municipality of the village of Montauban.
- 1949 - New iron aqueduct network, replacing the original network.
- 1949 - Acquisition of land for the factory to establish a fire department.
- 1 January 1973 - Annexations of some parts of Notre-Dame-de-Montauban municipality and Chavigny and Marmier.
- 2004 - Annexation of 20 km² of the territory of Lac-Masketsi (unorganized territory), which is part of Missionary Lake area.

=== Religious chronology of Saint-Remi parish ===
- 21 January 1897 - Canonical foundation of Saint-Rémi parish decreed by the Roman Catholic Archdiocese of Quebec.
- 1 October 1897 - Arrival of the first parish priest Joseph-T. Thibaudeau. His term lasts until 1900.
- 1897 - Opening of the registers of baptisms, marriages and burials.
- 1898 - Construction of the church and the rectory.
- 1 January 2018 - Creation of the new "Fabrique" of the parish of Saint-Coeur-de-Marie, merging the "Fabrique" of Notre-Dame-des-Anges, Saint-Éloi-les-Mines, Saint- Rémi-du-Lac-aux-Sables, St. Leopold of Hervey-Junction, St. Thecla and St. Adelphe.

The church of Saint-Rémi, built entirely of wood, is the pride of its parishioners.

=== Hervey-Jonction sector ===
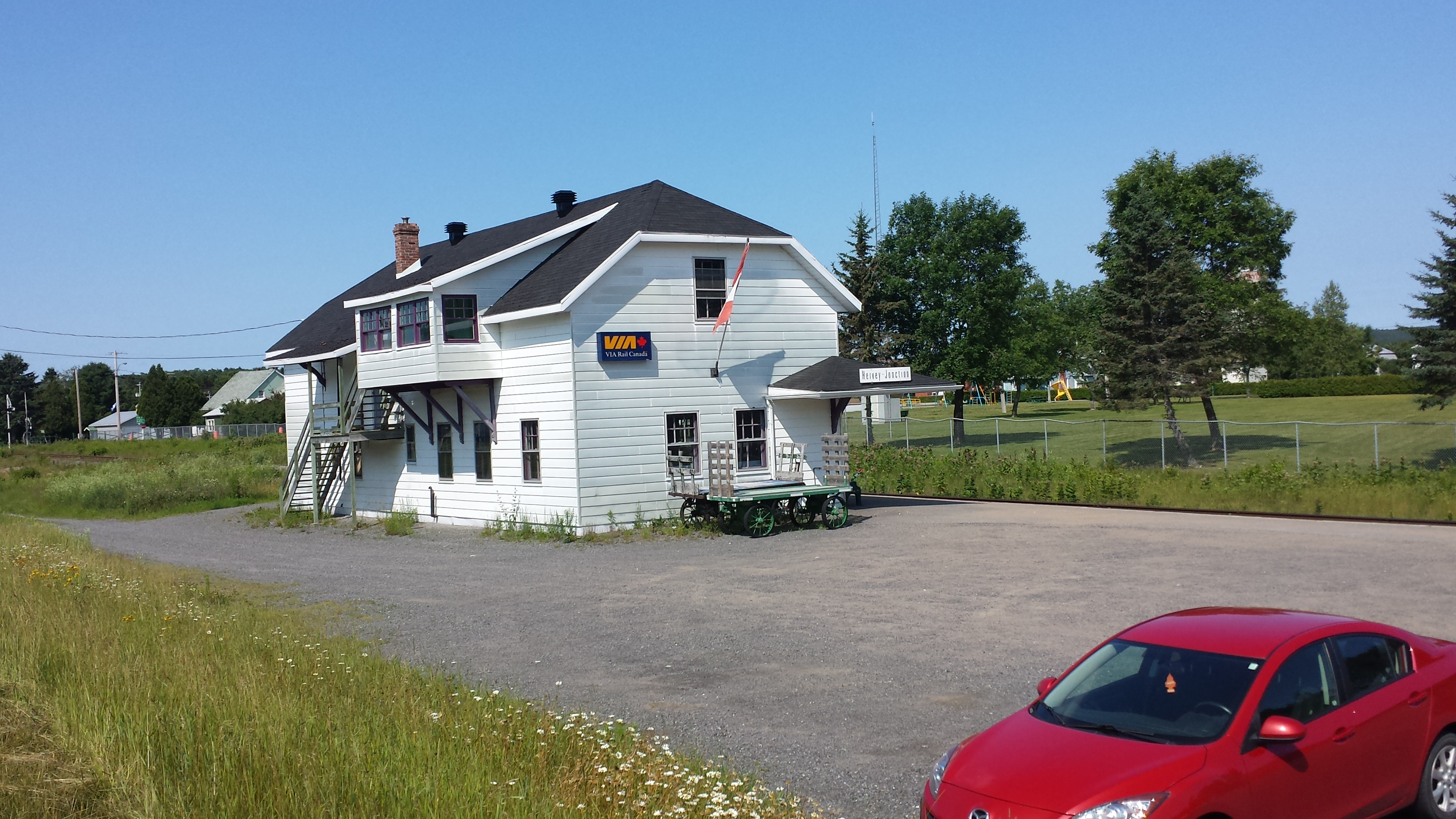
Hervey-Jonction railway station (Mauricie, Quebec, Canada) located since 14 September 2007 on the new site facing the Catholic chapel. This 2nd Hervey-Jonction station was located for 97 years on the old site.

Since its origins, the sector of Hervey-Jonction, which has a population of about 300 inhabitants, is linked to the history of Lac-aux-Sables. On the religious side, the service Saint-Leopold Hervey-Jonction serves the local population. On the civilian side, this area has been integrated into the parish municipality of Lac-aux-Sables since the beginning.

The second Hervey station was built in 1905 and is then the junction point for trains from Montréal to the city of Quebec, Saguenay-Lac-Saint-Jean, the Haut-Saint-Maurice and the Abitibi. Now, the train stops for a few minutes to separate and route the two passenger trains (the Abitibi] and the Saguenay-Lac-Saint-Jean.

=== Religious chronology of St. Leopold of Hervey-Jonction ===
- First chapel built in the 1930s, thanks to the initiative of some parishioners.
- 3 October 1934 - First marriage in the chapel of Hervey-Jonction, and the register of Saint-Rémi Lac-aux-Sables.
- 27 November 1947 - First recorded baptism registers of St Leopold of Hervey-Jonction, Danielle Veillette (daughter of Zénon Veillette and Élianne Toutant).
- Auguste Lagacé is assigned as vicar cooperator from 1947 to 1961, to the mission (déserte in French) of St. Leopold which is under the jurisdiction of the parish of Saint-Rémi of Lac-aux-Sables.
- 21 May 1949 - First marriage recorded in the registers of St. Leopold of Hervey-Jonction: Gaston Cossette and Gisele Veillette.
- 25 April 1953 - Authorization of Archbishop Maurice Roy to establish a parish cemetery. Burials began in 1953.
- 9 May 1953 - First burial at the cemetery: Romeo Marcotte.
- 1965 - Beginning in 1965, Hervey-Jonction mission, which was within the diocese of Quebec, will be subject henceforth to the jurisdiction of the Diocese of Trois-Rivières.
- 1974 - Sales of rectory to build a new, adjacent to the chapel.

=== School chronology ===
- 1891 - Establishment of the first school district by the "Commission scolaire de Notre-Dame-des-Anges" (Notre-Dame-des-Anges School Board), for 2nd and 3rd rows taxpayers of Chavigny township.
- 1901 - Establishment of the "Commission scolaire de Saint-Rémi du Lac-aux-Sables" (Saint-Rémi School Board). Joseph Sainte-Marie will be President from 1901 to 1906, whereas the priest Jos.-S. Chénard was appointed secretary-treasurer from 1901 to 1902.
- 1901 - Arrival of Sisters "Servants of the Holy Heart of Mary" for teaching mission.
- 1935 - Construction of the new convent to replace the old one.
- 1965 - Establishment of the Regional School Board of Mauricie (CSRM-Commission scolaire régionale de la Mauricie) for secondary education, while the "Commission scolaire de Saint-Rémi Lac-aux-Sables" (St-Rémi School Board) continues to mentor elementary education.
- 1 July 1969 - Creation of the "Commission scolaire de Normandie" (Normandie School Board) for primary education throughout the Normandy area (except Sainte-Thècle). The "Commission scolaire de Saint-Rémi" (Saint-Rémi School Board) ends its activities as of 30 June 1969.
- June 1969 - Cessation of secondary education for level three and more in Sainte-Thècle. Furthermore, this secondary teaching (level three and more) will be at "École polyvalente Paul Le Jeune" (Polyvalent School Paul Le Jeune) in Saint-Tite, which open its doors in September 1969, while students in Secondary 1 and 2 continue to attend school Aubin in Sainte-Thècle.
- 1998 - The "Commission scolaire de Normandie" (Normandie School Board) is dissolved as of 30 June 1998. As of 1 July 1998, the "Commission scolaire de l'énergie" (School Board of Energy) is responsible for administering elementary and secondary schools on the same territory than former CSRM - Commission scolaire régionale de la Mauricie (either (Notre-Dame-du-Mont-Carmel, Quebec) to Parent, Quebec, Abitibi).

== Geography ==
The municipality of the parish of Lac-aux-Sables is located about 95 kilometres (59 mi) northwest of the Quebec City, in the populated part of the Mékinac Regional County Municipality. The Batiscan River cut the municipal territory into two parts. The right bank of this river has two major tributaries: the Propre River (meaning: "clean River") and Tawachiche River.

The toponym "Lac aux Sables" comes from the lake of the same name. The lake has three tributaries, the most important is the outlet of "Brulé Lake". The two other are the outlets of Veillette Lake and "à la roche" (river to the rock). The mouth of the "Lac-aux-Sables" (Lake of sand) flows through the south into the Propre River whose path passes through Huron Lake (located to the west).

The territory of Lac-aux-Sables is mostly included in the Batiscanie, except the area of Missionary Lake at the western boundary, on the edge of Sainte-Thèecle which flows in the sub-basin of the Mekinac River, unless another area on the edge of Saint-Ubalde (East) which flows into the Charest river.

In 2004, Lac-Masketsi (unorganized territory) was reduced in size by some 90 square kilometres (35 sq mi) when portions were annexed by mostly Trois-Rives (70 km²) as well as Lac-aux-Sables (20 km²).

North of Hervey-Jonction, the area is dotted with cottages, rivers, lakes and wild forests.

== Demographics ==
In the 2021 Census of Population conducted by Statistics Canada, Lac-aux-Sables had a population of 1,380 living in 744 of its 1,157 total private dwellings, a change of 6.8% from its 2016 population of 1,292. With a land area of 269.7 km^{2} (104.1 sq mi), it had a population density of 5.1/km^{2} (13.3/sq mi) in 2021.

Historical census populations – Lac-aux-Sables

Year	Pop.	±%
1901	263	—
1911	1,088	+313.7%
1921	1,216	+11.8%
1931	1,397	+14.9%
1941	1,467	+5.0%
1951	1,638	+11.7%
1956	1,676	+2.3%

Year	Pop.	±%
1961	1,681	+0.3%
1966	1,632	−2.9%
1971	1,488	−8.8%
1976	1,396	−6.2%
1981	1,454	+4.2%
1986	1,411	−3.0%
1991	1,428	+1.2%

Year	Pop.	±%
1996	1,441	+0.9%
2001	1,313	−8.9%
2006	1,312	−0.1%
2011	1,373	+4.6%
2016	1,292	−5.9%
2021	1,380	+6.8%

Source: Statistics Canada

Mother tongue (2021):

- English as first language: 0.4%
- French as first language: 98.5%
- English and French as first languages: 0%
- Other as first language: 1.1%

== Attractions ==
The main attractions directly related to the resort and tourism are:

- five campgrounds for which three with beautiful beaches (Lac aux Sables),
- an important camp for students ("Lac en coeur") since 1946,
- a development controlled area (Zec Tawachiche) since 1979, that is popular for activities in nature such as walking, canoeing, camping, hunting, fishing, observation of nature (wildlife animals, plants and scenic views),
- a beautiful golf club (the Saint-Rémi) since 1970,
- 47 lakes (Lac aux Sables (lake of sand), Brûlé (burned), Huron, Missionaries, Simon, Veillette, etc..) and three rivers, Batiscan and two of its tributaries:
  - the Tawachiche River that is 25 km long, flows entirely within the municipality;
  - the Propre River which is the outlet of Lac-aux-Sables, and flows in a south-west to empty into Lake Huron and the River Propre resumes its course at the mouth of the latter lake to flow south-east and emptying into the Batiscan River.

Almost 500 chalets are built around various bodies of water.

== See also ==
- Hervey-Jonction railway station
- Missionary Paul Le Jeune - "Lac du Missionnaire" (Missionary lake) in Lac-aux-Sables (at the boundary of Sainte-Thècle) was designated in recognition of this missionary and explorer who founded Trois-Rivières in 1634.
