= Lac-Masketsi =

- Unorganized territory
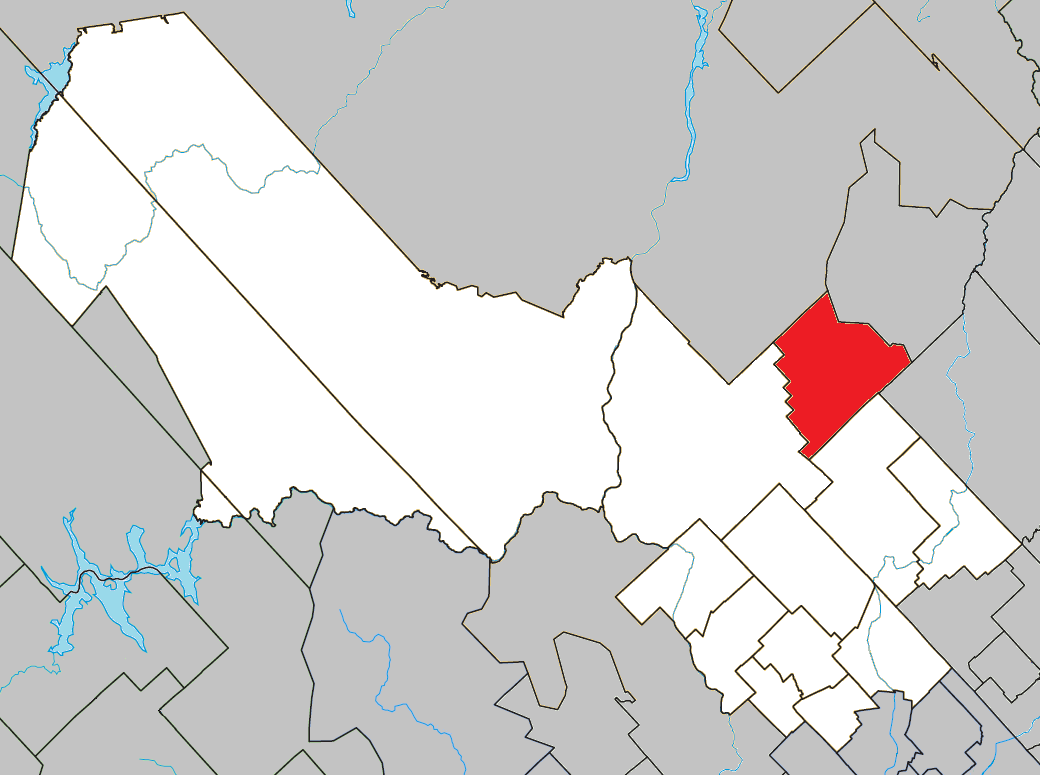
- Location within Mékinac RCM

- Location in central Quebec
- Coordinates: 47°00′N 72°33′W
- Country: Canada
- Province: Quebec
- Region: Mauricie
- RCM: Mékinac
- Constituted: January 1, 1986

Government
  - Fed. riding: Saint-Maurice—Champlain
  - Prov. riding: Laviolette

Area
  - Total: 224.52 km^{2} (86.69 sq mi)
  - Land: 211.51 km^{2} (81.66 sq mi)

Population (2021)
  - Total: 0
  - Density: 0/km^{2} (0/sq mi)
  - Change 2016-21: 0%
  - Dwellings: 0
- Time zone: UTC−5 (EST)
  - Summer (DST): UTC−4 (EDT)
- Highways: No major routes

Lac-Masketsi is an unorganized territory in the Mauricie region of province of Quebec, Canada, part of the Mékinac Regional County Municipality. Most of its area is part of the Zec Tawachiche.

The Canadian National Railway to Abitibi runs from 1909, linking Hervey-Jonction to La Tuque. The railway was built along the eastern shore of this lake, and was servicing the hamlets of Gouin and Lac-Masketsi (47°00′06″N 72°33′33″W). Each hamlet had a railway station that has long served the lumber camps, resorts and tourist activities.

== Toponymy ==
It is named after Lake Masketsi that is located within its boundaries. This name first appeared on a map from 1870 by Eugène-Étienne Taché and is of Amerindian origin meaning "moccasin".

== Geography ==
The discharge of Lake Masketsi at the south-east flows in the Little Lake Masketsi, which empties into the Tawachiche West River.

In 2004, Lac-Masketsi was reduced in size by some 90 square kilometres (35 sq mi) when portions were annexed by mostly Trois-Rives (70 km²) as well as Lac-aux-Sables (20 km²).

== Demographics ==
Historical census populations – Lac-Masketsi
Year	Pop.	±%
1991	0	—
1996	4	—
2001	10	+150.0%
2006	5	−50.0%
2011	0	−100.0%
2016	0	0.00%
2021	0	0.00%
Population counts are not adjusted for boundary changes. Source: Statistics Canada

Private dwellings occupied by usual residents: 0 (total dwellings: 0)

== Economy ==
The economy of this unorganized territory is mainly focused on forestry, resorts and tourist activities. This area is mostly forest and has many mountainous areas.

== See also ==
- Batiscanie
- Lac-aux-Sables
- Trois-Rives
