= Doucet River =

- Location within Quebec

Location
- Country: Canada
- Province: Quebec
- Region: Mauricie
- City and municipality: La Tuque

Physical characteristics
- Source: Perdrix Lake
  - location: La Tuque
  - coordinates: 47°27′11″N 72°28′02″E
  - elevation: 365 m
- Mouth: Lac au Lard
  - location: La Tuque
  - coordinates: 47°17′25″N 72°24′34″W
  - elevation: 321 m
- Length: 29.4 km (18.3 mi)

Basin features
- Tributaries
  - left: (Upward from the mouth) Décharge d’un petit lac non identifié, décharge (via le lac de l’Hiver) des lacs de l’Été et de l’Automne, décharge (via le lac Doucet) d’un ensemble de lacs non identifiés, décharge (via le lac Doucet) du lac du Printemps, décharge du lac Lemoine, décharge (via le lac Tessier) de deux lacs non identifiés, décharge du lac Bleu, décharge (via le Lac à la Loutre) du lac Dag, décharge (via le Lac à la Loutre) d’un lac non identifié, décharge (via le Lac à la Loutre) d’un lac non identifié, cinq décharges de ruisseaux (via les lacs au Loup et des Amandiers).
  - right: (Upward from the mouth) Décharge d’un ensemble de lacs dont du Loup, Voisin, Fogh, Indépendant et Paulette, ruisseau non identifié, ruisseau non identifié, décharge du lac Petiot, décharge d’un ensemble de lacs dont Vadenet, Gérald et Daunay, décharge du lac Dubois (via le lac Scott), décharge du lac du Tournant, ruisseau non identifié (via le lac Tessier), décharge d’un petit lac non identifié, décharge du lac Megan (via le Lac à la Loutre), décharge d'un lac non identifié, décharge des lacs Ken et Moisan

The Doucet River is a tributary of the southern shore of Lac au Lard, in the hydrographic slope of the Jeannotte River, in the territory of the town of La Tuque, in the administrative region of Mauricie, in Quebec, in Canada. This river flows in the zec de la Bessonne.

The course of the Doucet River descends on the west side of the Batiscan River and on the east side of the Saint-Maurice River. This river is part of the hydrographic side of the Batiscan river which generally winds south to the north shore of the St. Lawrence River.

This hydrographic slope is mainly served by the path of Lac au Lard which passes on the east side of this valley.

Since the mid-19th century, forestry has been the predominant activity of the Doucet River watershed; recreational activities, second.

The surface of the Doucet River (except the rapids areas) is generally frozen from the beginning of December to the end of March. However, safe circulation on the ice is generally done from the end of December to the beginning of March. The water level of the river varies with the seasons and the precipitation.

== Geography ==
The Doucet river draws its source from Lake Perdrix (length: 2.2 kilometres (1.4 mi); altitude: 365 metres (1,198 ft)) located in La Tuque. The mouth of this lake is located 27.2 kilometres (16.9 mi) south of the village center of Lac-Édouard, 24.0 kilometres (14.9 mi) northeast of downtown town of La Tuque and 10.8 kilometres (6.7 mi) northeast of lake Wayagamac.

The Doucet River flows into the town of La Tuque, at the bottom of a bay on the south shore of lac au Lard. This confluence of the Doucet river is located at:

- 11.5 kilometres (7.1 mi) West of the confluence of the Jeannotte River and the Batiscan River;
- 7.1 kilometres (4.4 mi) south of the confluence of the ruisseau du Lac au Lard and the Jeannotte river;
- 11.2 kilometres (7.0 mi) south-east of Petit lac Wayagamac;
- 42.2 kilometres (26.2 mi) South of the village center of Lac-Édouard;
- 33.8 kilometres (21.0 mi) Southeast of downtown La Tuque.

From the mouth, the current crosses north on 3.4 kilometres (2.1 mi) lac au Lard (length: 6.9 kilometres (4.3 mi); altitude: 321 metres (1,053 ft)), descends successively to the northeast on 1.9 kilometres (1.2 mi) the course of the Lac au Lard stream, to the south then eastward on 20.8 kilometres (12.9 mi) the course of the Jeannotte River, and on the course of the Batiscan River which flows onto the northwest bank of the St. Lawrence River.

== Toponymy ==
The term Doucet turns out to be a family name of French origin. The toponym "Rivière Doucet" was formalized on April 3, 1986, at the Commission de toponymie du Québec.

== See also ==
- Zec de la Bessonne, a controlled harvesting zone (zec)
- La Tuque, a city
- Ruisseau du Lac au Lard
- Lac au Lard
- Jeannotte River, a stream
- Batiscan River, a stream
- St. Lawrence River, a stream
- List of rivers of Quebec
