= Ruisseau du Lac au Lard =

Location
- Country: Canada
- Province: Quebec
- Region: Mauricie
- City: La Tuque

Physical characteristics
- Source: Lac au Lard
  - location: La Tuque
  - coordinates: 47°20′03″N 72°23′25″W
  - elevation: 321
- Mouth: Jeannotte River
  - location: La Tuque
  - coordinates: 47°20′50″N 72°22′00″W
  - elevation: 320 m
- Length: 1.9 km (1.2 mi)

The Ruisseau du Lac au Lard stream is a tributary of the west bank of the Jeannotte River, flowing in the western hydrographic slope of the Batiscan River, in the territory of the city of La Tuque, in the administrative region of Mauricie, in Quebec, in Canada. This river crosses the zec de la Bessonne.

This hydrographic slope is served by the forest road R040, a bridge spanning the Lac au Lard stream, near its mouth.

Since the mid-19th century, forestry has been the predominant activity of the Lac au Lard stream watershed; recreational activities, second.

The surface of the Lac au Lard stream (except the rapids areas) is generally frozen from the beginning of December to the end of March, however the safe circulation on the ice is generally made from the end of December to the beginning of March. The water level of the river varies with the seasons and the precipitation.

== Geography ==
The stream of the Rivière au Lard rises at the mouth of lac au Lard (length: 6.9 kilometres (4.3 mi); altitude: 321 metres (1,053 ft)). This forest lake is mainly fed to the northwest by the discharge of a set of lakes including Lac de la Grosse Roche and by the Doucet River (coming from the south).

The mouth of this lake is located 12.0 kilometres (7.5 mi) North-West of the mouth of the confluence of the Jeannotte River with the Batiscan River.

From the mouth of Lac au Lard, the Lac au Lard stream flows for 1.9 kilometres (1.2 mi) north-east, up to the confluence of the river. There are no tributaries.

The Lac au Lard stream flows on the west bank of the Jeannotte River course. This confluence is located at:

- 10.8 kilometres (6.7 mi) north-west of the confluence of the Jeannotte and Batiscan rivers;
- 10.8 kilometres (6.7 mi) south-east of Petit lac Wayagamac;
- 37.6 kilometres (23.4 mi) South of the center of the village of Lac-Édouard;
- 34.7 kilometres (21.6 mi) East of downtown La Tuque.

From the mouth, the current descends on 20.8 kilometres (12.9 mi) to the south then east the course of the Jeannotte River, and on the course of the river Batiscan towards the south which pours on the northwest bank of the St. Lawrence River.

== Toponymy ==
The toponym "Ruisseau du Lac au Lard" was formalized on December 5, 1968, at the Commission de toponymie du Québec.

== See also ==
- List of lakes of Canada
