= Petite rivière Vermillon =

- Location within Quebec
- Native name: Rivière du Roc Fendu (French)

Location
- Country: Canada
- Province: Quebec
- Region: Mauricie
- City and municipality: La Tuque and Lac-Édouard

Physical characteristics
- Source: Lac au Bouquet
  - location: Lac-Édouard, Quebec
  - coordinates: 47°34′20″N 72°25′57″W
  - elevation: 373 m (1,224 ft)
- Mouth: Jeannotte River
  - location: La Tuque, Quebec
  - coordinates: 47°25′13″N 72°20′35″W
  - elevation: 324 m (1,063 ft)
- Length: 28.4 km (17.6 mi)
- Basin size: 141 km^{2} (54 mi^{2})

Basin features
- Progression: Jeannotte River → Batiscan River → St. Lawrence River → Gulf of St. Lawrence / Atlantic Ocean
- Tributaries
  - left: (Upward from the mouth) Lake Battue outlet, Hees lake outlet, Liney lake outlet, Six Caribous lake outlet.
  - right: (Upward from the mouth) Discharge from Lac du Crapaud, discharge from Lake Francoeur, Emma stream, discharge from Lakes Hélène, Alfred, Harry, Shamus, Oléa and Florence, discharge from Lake Jambon.

The Petite rivière Vermillon is a tributary of the west bank of the Jeannotte River, flowing in the municipality of Lac-Édouard (canton of Bickerdike) and of La Tuque (township of Charest and Laurier), in the administrative region of Mauricie, in province of Quebec, in Canada.

The course of the “Petite Rivière Vermillon” descends from the west side of the Batiscan River and from the east side of the Saint-Maurice River. This river is part of the hydrographic side of the Batiscan River which generally winds south to the north bank of the St. Lawrence River.

The course of the "Petite Rivière Vermillon" descends entirely into the forest zone. The river surface is generally frozen from mid-December until the end of March.

Since the middle of the 19th century, forestry has been the predominant activity of the "Petite Rivière Vermillon" watershed.

== Geography ==
The "Petite Rivière Vermillon" has its source in a forest area, at the mouth of Lac au Bouquet (length: 3.1 kilometres (1.9 mi); altitude: 373 metres (1,224 ft)). This lake in the township of Bickerdike is located 1.0 kilometre (0.62 mi) west of a bay in Lac Édouard, Quebec.

The mouth of this lake is located 5.4 kilometres (3.4 mi) northwest of the mouth of Lac-Édouard (head of the Jeannotte River), 14.7 kilometres (9.1 mi) Southwest of the village center of Lac-Édouard and 28.6 kilometres (17.8 mi) East of the city center of La Tuque .

From the mouth of Lac au Bouquet, the "Petite Rivière Vermillon" flows over 28.4 kilometres (17.6 mi), according to the following segments:

Upper course of the river (segment of 13.3 kilometres (8.3 mi))

- 2.1 kilometres (1.3 mi) south-west in the canton of Bickerdike, to the north-east shore of Lac Eugène;
- 6.2 kilometres (3.9 mi) towards the South-West, crossing Lake Eugène (length: 0.8 kilometres (0.50 mi); altitude: 361 metres (1,184 ft)) at the start of the segment on its full length, then the Algonquin Lake (length: 5.6 kilometres (3.5 mi); altitude: 361 metres (1,184 ft)) on 5.0 kilometres (3.1 mi) until 'at its mouth. Note: Algonguin Lake straddles the township of Bickerdike (Lac-Édouard) and the township of Charest (La Tuque);
- 1.4 kilometres (0.87 mi) towards the South-East, passing between two mountains, then crossing Lake Stanislas (length: 2.9 kilometres (1.8 mi); altitude: 355 metres (1,165 ft)) until its mouth;
- 3.6 kilometres (2.2 mi) towards the South-East by crossing the "Small Lac Écarté" (altitude: 355 metres (1,165 ft)) over its full length, up to its mouth;

Lower river (segment of 15.1 kilometres (9.4 mi))

- 5.0 kilometres (3.1 mi) towards the South-East, collecting the outlet of Lac du Crapaud (coming from the South-West), then crossing Lake Eveline (length: 2.4 kilometres (1.5 mi) ; altitude: 351 metres (1,152 ft)) on 1.9 kilometres (1.2 mi), to its mouth;
- 2.0 kilometres (1.2 mi) towards the Southeast, crossing Lake Owen (length: 1.5 kilometres (0.93 mi); altitude: 346 metres (1,135 ft)) on 0.8 kilometres (0.50 mi), to its mouth;
- 1.5 kilometres (0.93 mi) south-east, crossing Lake Edmond (length: 1.2 kilometres (0.75 mi); altitude: 340 metres (1,120 ft)) on 0.8 kilometres (0.50 mi), to its mouth;
- 6.0 kilometres (3.7 mi) eastwards, to the limit of the township of Laurier;
- 0.6 kilometres (0.37 mi) to the south in the marsh area, meandering to the confluence of the river.

The "Petite Rivière Vermillon" flows into the township of Laurier in the town of La Tuque on the north shore of Lac du Castor which is crossed in its eastern part by the Jeannotte River.

The confluence of the "Petite Rivière Vermillon" is located at:

- 16.5 kilometres (10.3 mi) North-West of the confluence of the Jeannotte River;
- 25.7 kilometres (16.0 mi) south of the village center of Lac-Édouard;
- 31.4 kilometres (19.5 mi) east of downtown La Tuque.

== Toponymy ==
The toponym "Petite rivière Vermillon" was formalized on December 5, 1968, at the Commission de toponymie du Québec.

== See also ==
- List of rivers of Quebec
