= Rivière aux Rognons =

- Location within Quebec

Location
- Country: Canada
- Province: Quebec
- Region: Mauricie
- City and municipality: La Tuque and Lac-Édouard

Physical characteristics
- Source: Lac Chevautier
  - location: Lac-Édouard, Quebec
  - coordinates: 47°28′47″N 72°13′37″W
  - elevation: 374 m (1,227 ft)
- Mouth: Jeannotte River
  - location: La Tuque, Quebec
  - coordinates: 47°18′17″N 72°19′58″W
  - elevation: 289 m (948 ft)
- Length: 24.6 km (15.3 mi)
- Basin size: 121.4 km^{2} (46.9 sq mi)

Basin features
- Progression: Jeannotte River → Batiscan River → St. Lawrence River → Gulf of St. Lawrence / Atlantic Ocean
- Tributaries
  - left: (Upward from the mouth) Discharge from Lake Vallée and Maynard, discharge from Lake Falkenberg, discharge from Lake Chenu, discharge from Lake Goulven, discharge from Lakes Stadacona and Deux Bras, discharge from Lake Noron.
  - right: (Upward from the mouth) Lake Corail outlet, Budget lake outlet, Patry, Corvée and Félix lakes outlet, Lac Laçon outlet, Lac au Bec outlet.

The Rivière aux Rognons (English: Kidneys River) is a tributary of the northeast shore of the Jeannotte River, flowing in the municipality of Lac-Édouard and the town of La Tuque, in the administrative region of Mauricie, in province, in Quebec, in Canada.

The course of the “Rivière aux Rognons” descends on the west side of the Batiscan River and on the east side of the Saint-Maurice River. This river is part of the hydrographic side of the Batiscan River which generally winds south to the north bank of the St. Lawrence River.

The course of the “Rivière aux Rognons” descends entirely into the forest zone in a territory considered to be an island, taking into account that lac Édouard (Quebec) has two outlets. This island is bounded by the Batiscan River (to the east), the Jeannotte River (to the west) and the Lake Édouard (Quebec) (to the north). The river surface is generally frozen from mid-December until the end of March.

Since the middle of the 19th century, forestry has been the predominant activity of the "Rivière aux Rognons" watershed.

== Geography ==
The "Rivière aux Rognons" has its source in a forest area, at the mouth of Lac Chevautier (length: 0.7 kilometres (0.43 mi); altitude: 374 metres (1,227 ft)). This lake is located 0.8 kilometres (0.50 mi) west of the Sanford train stop at Canadian National, on the north side of a mountain whose summit reaches 472 metres (1,549 ft) and on the southeast side of another mountain whose summit reaches 456 metres (1,496 ft).

The mouth of this lake is located 2.1 kilometres (1.3 mi) west of the Batiscan River, 19.1 kilometres (11.9 mi) south of the center of the village of Lac-Édouard and 43.1 kilometres (26.8 mi) east of downtown La Tuque.

From the mouth of Lac Chevautier, the "Rognons River" flows over 24.6 kilometres (15.3 mi), according to the following segments:

Upper course of the river (segment of 9.6 kilometres (6.0 mi))

- 2.8 kilometres (1.7 mi) towards the south crossing Lake Marteau (length: 2.3 kilometres (1.4 mi) in the north–south axis; altitude: 367 metres (1,204 ft)) to its mouth;
- 1.7 kilometres (1.1 mi) towards the South crossing Lac au Coeur (length: 0.6 kilometres (0.37 mi) in the north–south axis; altitude: 364 metres (1,194 ft)) to the north shore of "Lac aux Rognons";
- 5.1 kilometres (3.2 mi) towards the South, crossing the "Lac aux Rognons" (length: 9.2 kilometres (5.7 mi) in the north–south axis; altitude: 362 metres (1,188 ft)), to the dam at its mouth. Note: "Lac aux Rognons" straddles the township of Trudel and the township of Laurier;

Lower river (segment of 15.0 kilometres (9.3 mi))

- 1.3 kilometres (0.81 mi) south-west, to a bay on the north shore of Lac Laurier;
- 6.2 kilometres (3.9 mi) towards the South, crossing Laurier Lake (length: 6.3 kilometres (3.9 mi) in the north–south axis; altitude: 341 metres (1,119 ft)), to the dam at its mouth;
- 3.0 kilometres (1.9 mi) to the Southwest, crossing Caribou Lake (length: 1.6 kilometres (0.99 mi); altitude: 323 metres (1,060 ft)) at its full length, to the dam at its mouth located to the south;
- 1.6 kilometres (0.99 mi) towards the South, crossing Lake Béliveau (length: 0.5 kilometres (0.31 mi); altitude: 321 metres (1,053 ft)) over its full length, up to 'at its mouth. Note: Lac Béliveau is fed by the outlet (coming from the East) from Vallée, Maynard lakes;
- 2.9 kilometres (1.8 mi) (or 1.7 kilometres (1.1 mi) in a direct line) towards the South-West, winding up to the confluence of the river.

The "Rivière aux Rognons" flows on the northeast bank of the Jeannotte River in the town of La Tuque, 1.2 kilometres (0.75 mi) upstream of the northern limit of the Portneuf Wildlife Reserve.

The confluence of the “Rivière aux Rognons” is located at:

- 6.0 kilometres (3.7 mi) North-West of the confluence of the Jeannotte River;
- 40.3 kilometres (25.0 mi) South of the center of the village of Lac-Édouard;
- 38.4 kilometres (23.9 mi) South-East of the city center of La Tuque.

== Toponymy ==
The term "Rognon" constitutes a family name of French origin. This term "kidneys" means the kidneys of an animal.

The toponym "Rivière aux Rognons" was formalized on December 5, 1968, at the Commission de toponymie du Québec.

== See also ==
- List of rivers of Quebec
