= Jeannotte =

Jeannotte may refer to:

- Zec Jeannotte, Québec, Canada
- Jeannotte River, river in Mauricie, Quebec, Canada

== People with the surname ==
- Chantale Jeannotte, Quebec politician
- Dan Jeannotte (born 1981), Canadian actor
- Jean-Paul Jeannotte (1926–2021), Canadian tenor and opera artistic director
- Hormidas Jeannotte (1843–1909), Quebec politician and notary
- Joseph Jeannotte (1902–1988), Canadian politician in Manitoba

== See also ==
- Jeannette (disambiguation)
