= Lac au Lard =

Lake in Quebec, Canada

- Location in Quebec
- Location: La Tuque, Mauricie
- Coordinates: 47.33417°N 72.39361°W
- Lake type: Natural
- Primary inflows: (Clockwise, from the confluence) Three discharges of unidentified lakes emptying on east shore, Doucet River, five unidentified streams empting on the west shore, discharge of few lakes including the "Lac de la Grosse Roche".
- Primary outflows: Ruisseau du Lac au Lard
- Basin countries: Canada
- Max. length: 6.9 km (4.3 mi)
- Max. width: 0.7 km (0.43 mi)
- Surface elevation: 321 m (1,053 ft)

The lac au Lard is the main body of water on the slope of the ruisseau du Lac au Lard, located in Haute-Batiscanie, in the town of La Tuque, in the administrative region of Mauricie, in Quebec, in Canada.

Forestry is the main economic activity in the sector; recreational activities, second.

The surface of Lac au Lard is generally frozen from the beginning of December to the end of March; however, safe circulation on the ice is generally from late December to early March.

== Geography ==
Lac au Lard has a length of 6.9 kilometres (4.3 mi), a width of 0.7 kilometres (0.43 mi) and an altitude of 321 metres (1,053 ft).

This lake is made in length. A road bridge over the forest road R0400 intersects the northern part of the lake, thus forming a bay stretching for 1.6 kilometres (0.99 mi) to the northwest.

Lac au Lard has several small bays.

The mouth of Lac au Lard is located 12.0 kilometres (7.5 mi) North-West of the mouth of the confluence of the Jeannotte River with the Batiscan River, near which passes the Canadian National railway, and 9.6 kilometres (6.0 mi) east of Petit lac Wayagamac.

From the mouth of Lac au Lard, the current descends successively towards the northeast on 1.9 kilometres (1.2 mi), on 20.8 kilometres (12.9 mi) first towards the south then towards the east following the course of the Jeannotte River, and on the course of the Batiscan river towards the south which flows on the northwest bank of the St. Lawrence River.

== Toponymy ==
The toponym "lac au Lard" was formalized on December 5, 1968, at the Place Names Bank of the Commission de toponymie du Québec.

=== See also ===
- Batiscanie
- Zec de la Bessonne, a controlled harvesting zone (zec)
- St. Lawrence River, a stream
- List of rivers of Quebec
