= Lac-Édouard station =

Railway station in Quebec, Canada

Lac-Édouard
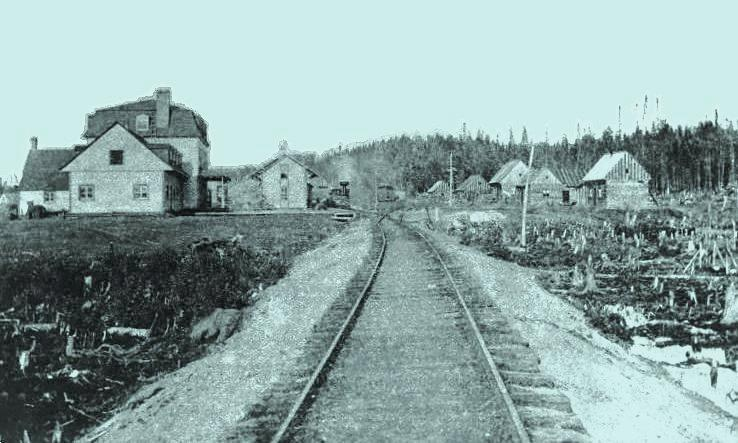
- Station and hotel photographed in 1910

General information
- Coordinates: 47.6586°N 72.2743°W

Construction
- Structure type: Sign post

Services
Preceding station	Via Rail	Following station
Triton Club toward Jonquière	Montreal–Jonquière	Cherokee toward Montreal
Location

Lac-Édouard station is a Via Rail station in Lac-Édouard, Quebec, Canada. It is a request stop consisting of an unstaffed shelter. As of 2024, the station building is permanently closed.

Considering the fact that the village of Lac-Édouard was away from main roads, the railway artery, opened in 1885, was a key to economic development in the region. This railway, linking Montreal to Chambord, via Junction Garneau, greatly favored forestry, sanatorium (since 1904) and tourist activities. Lac-Édouard railroad station was the key point of transit of passengers and goods before the construction of roads.

== See also ==
- Lac-Edouard, Quebec
- Lake Edward Sanatorium
