= Petit lac Wayagamac =

Lake in Quebec, Canada

- Location in Quebec
- Location: La Tuque, Mauricie, Quebec, Canada
- Coordinates: 47.37778°N 72.52722°W
- Lake type: Natural
- Primary outflows: Little Bostonnais River (French: Petite rivière Bostonnais)
- Basin countries: Canada
- Max. length: 4.5 km (2.8 mi)
- Max. width: 2.4 km (1.5 mi)
- Surface elevation: 281 m (922 ft)

The Petit lac Wayagamac is located in the city of La Tuque, in Mauricie, in Quebec, in Canada. Until 2006, the territory of this lake was part of the former unorganized territory of Petit-Lac-Wayagamac, before being merged with La Tuque. The territory of the lake is controlled by the Zec de la Bessonne.

== Geography ==
The mouth of Petit lac Wayagamac is located 18.5 kilometres (11.5 mi) (in a direct line) southeast of downtown La Tuque and 2.5 kilometres (1.6 mi) east of Lake Wayagamac. These two lakes are surrounded by the Laurentians (mountains) mountains, certain peaks exceeding 400 meters above sea level.

This Haute-Mauricie lake includes Bouleau Bay (which receives Bouleau Creek from the north) and Mystérieur Bay located at the mouth of the Mysterious River (coming from the south). Petit lac Wayagamac has a length of 4.5 kilometres (2.8 mi), a width of 2.4 kilometres (1.5 mi) and an altitude of 281 metres (922 ft).

Little Bostonnais River

From the outlet of Petit lac Wayagamac, the Petite Rivière Bostonnais (English: Little Bostonnais River) runs 4.4 km (2.7 mi) (measured by water) before emptying into Lake Wayagamac (southeast side). Lake Wayagamac in turn empties from the west into the Little Bostonnais River which is approximately 10.6 km (6.6 mi) long (measured by water), between the Wayagamac lake dam and the mouth of the river which flows into the Saint-Maurice River at the southern limit of the town of La Tuque (just south of the airport). From the outlet of Petit lac Wayagamac, the water from the Petite rivière Bostonnais flows over 23.6 km (14.7 mi), 8.6 km (5.3 mi) of which cross Lake Wayagamac from east to west.

== Toponymy ==
According to Father G. Lemoine, the expression "waweia gamak" is akin to the Algonquin language, and means "at the round lake".

The toponym "Petit lac Wayagamac" was officially registered on December 5, 1968, in the Place Names Bank of the Commission de toponymie du Québec.

In addition, Kruger, in partnership with the Société générale de financement du Québec (SGF Rexfor), acquired the Kruger Wayagamack plant in 2001. This plant is located on Île-de-la-Potherie, at Trois-Rivières.

== See also ==
- List of lakes of Canada
