= Lake Edward Sanatorium =

Coordinates: 47.6490°N 72.2915°W

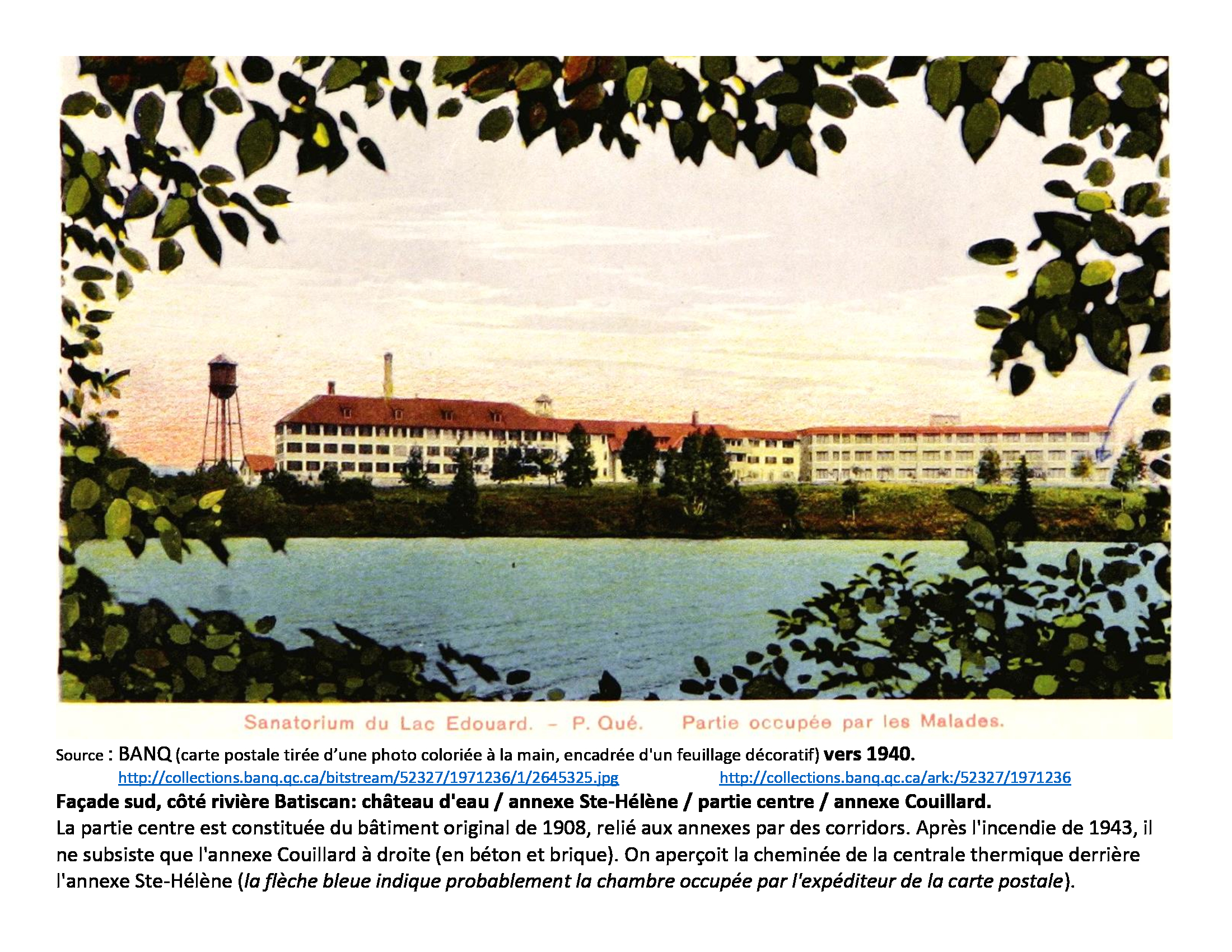
The Lake Edward Sanatorium circa 1940

The Lake Edward Sanatorium was created to treat tuberculosis patients before the availability of antibiotics and was long the main employer in Lac Édouard village. Its history covers a century, from 1904 to 2004, but its mission changed in 1968. The hospital complex is situated at the end of Lake Edward Village in "Haute Mauricie", in the province de Québec, Canada. The complex is built on a peninsula, north-east of lake Edward, 28 km long, at the head spring of Batiscan river. In 1904, there was no road, no electricity and no telephone. The nearest city was 179 km away by railway. Most of the buildings still exist.

== Territory access ==
The railway was the only access to lake Édouard and the telegraph was the only means to communicate with Québec city to order material or technical help. In 1961, a gravel road reached the road no 155 and the village of La Tuque, but only during the winter when the Bostonnais river was frozen. The bridge on the river was opened on October 13, 1963. The 25 km road was asphalted in 1983. The distance by road is 58 km to La Tuque and 295 km to Québec.

By autumn 1886., the fr:Quebec and Lake St-John Railway reached lake Édouard and, in 1888, Roberval village at lake Saint-Jean (the Canadian National Railway bought the company in 1918). A railway station with telegraph, a dormitory, a shunting yard, a water tower, a coal shed and a repair shop for steam locomotive were built near lake Édouard, 179 km from Québec city, midway to lake Saint-Jean. The six service doors of the repair shop (train roundhouse, called the "Rotonde") were set in a semi-circle allowing access to steam locomotives on a large turntable. The coming of the railway workers marked the beginning of the village of Lac-Édouard, Quebec.

The railway opened a large forested area and wealthy Americans rented tracts of land for hunting and fishing from the Québec government. In 1886, the Triton Fish and Game Club opened on a nearby lake. In 1888, the Paradise Fin and Feather Club, with Kit Clarke as treasurer, had some camps on Paradise island of lake Edward (today Ziegfeld island, bought in 1908 and sold in 1932). The railway "Time Table" folder of the summer 1894 listed 14 clubs along the railway. In 1903, a forest fire ended all lumber operation in the region. There was no longer a need to operate the dam on the Batiscan river to control water level for lumber transport and the operator's house became vacant. The owner, Sir Richard Turner, used the house as a fishing camp; he also owned the sawmill of the village and the steam boat used to bring the lumber from as far as Steam Boat Bay.

== The Lake Edward Sanatorium Association ==
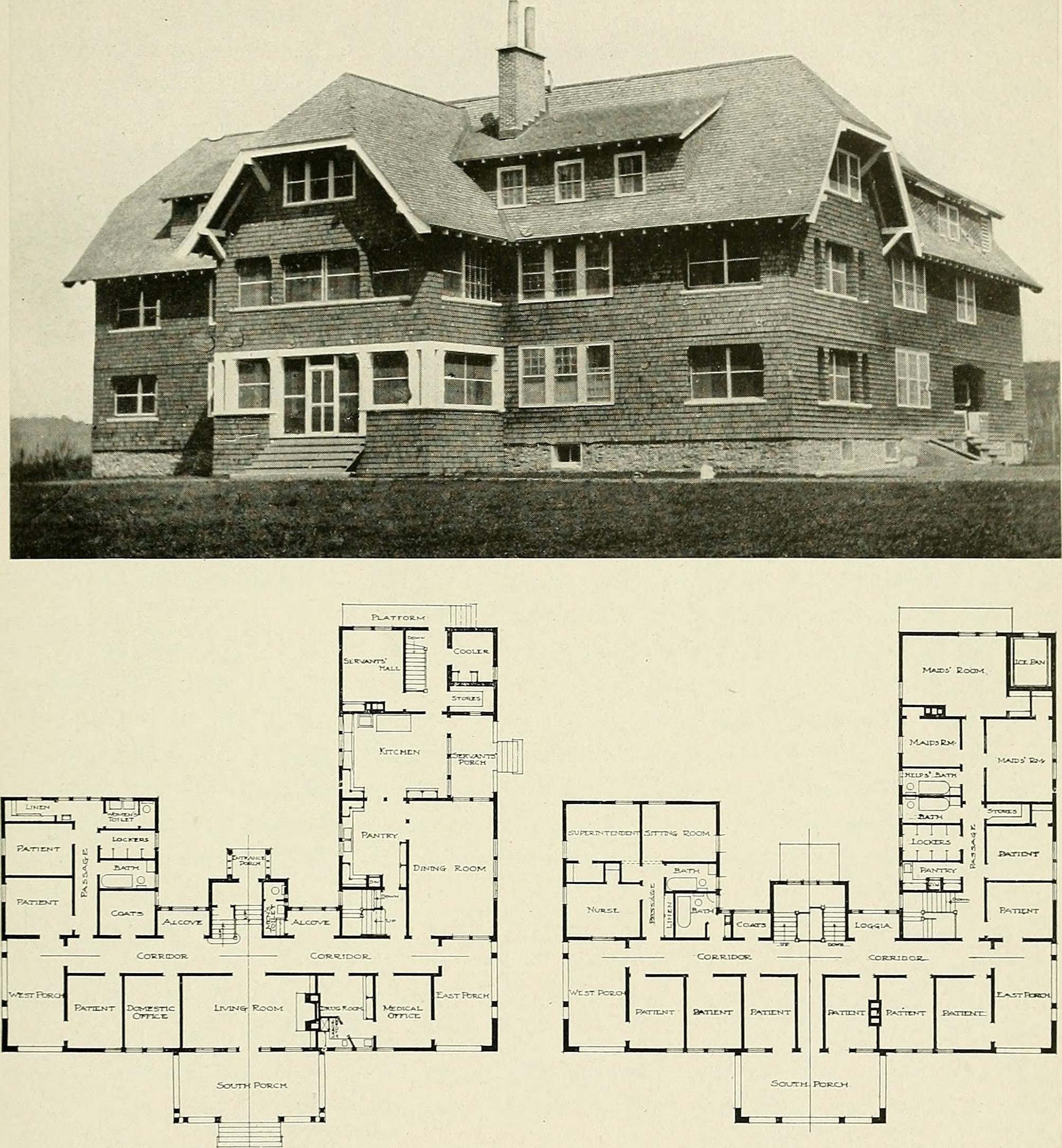
The Lake Edward Sanatorium in 1910.

The sanatorium started in 1904 when Richard Turner hosted three patients in his house. Lake Edward climate was believed to be healthy because of the 400 meter altitude. In 1905, as the house was not large enough for all the potential patients, Turner founded the Lake Edward Sanatorium Association with wealthy friends. The government of Québec granted 137 acres of land to the project. The sanatorium construction, at a cost of 26 000 Canadian dollars, started in 1908 with its official opening in 1909. The sanatorium goal was to accommodate up to 26 Anglo-Protestant patients. The main part of the building was 87' x 25', the west wing 28' x 19' and the east one 28' x 54'. In 1909, the directors accepted to receive French-catholic patients, provided that the Protestants had priority. After 1921, the association changed its mission in order to financially aid English hospitals and charitable organisations of Québec city. In 1976, its assets were transferred to the Citadel Foundation to help Anglo-Protestants in the Québec metropolitan area.

== Leasing by the Federal Government of Canada ==
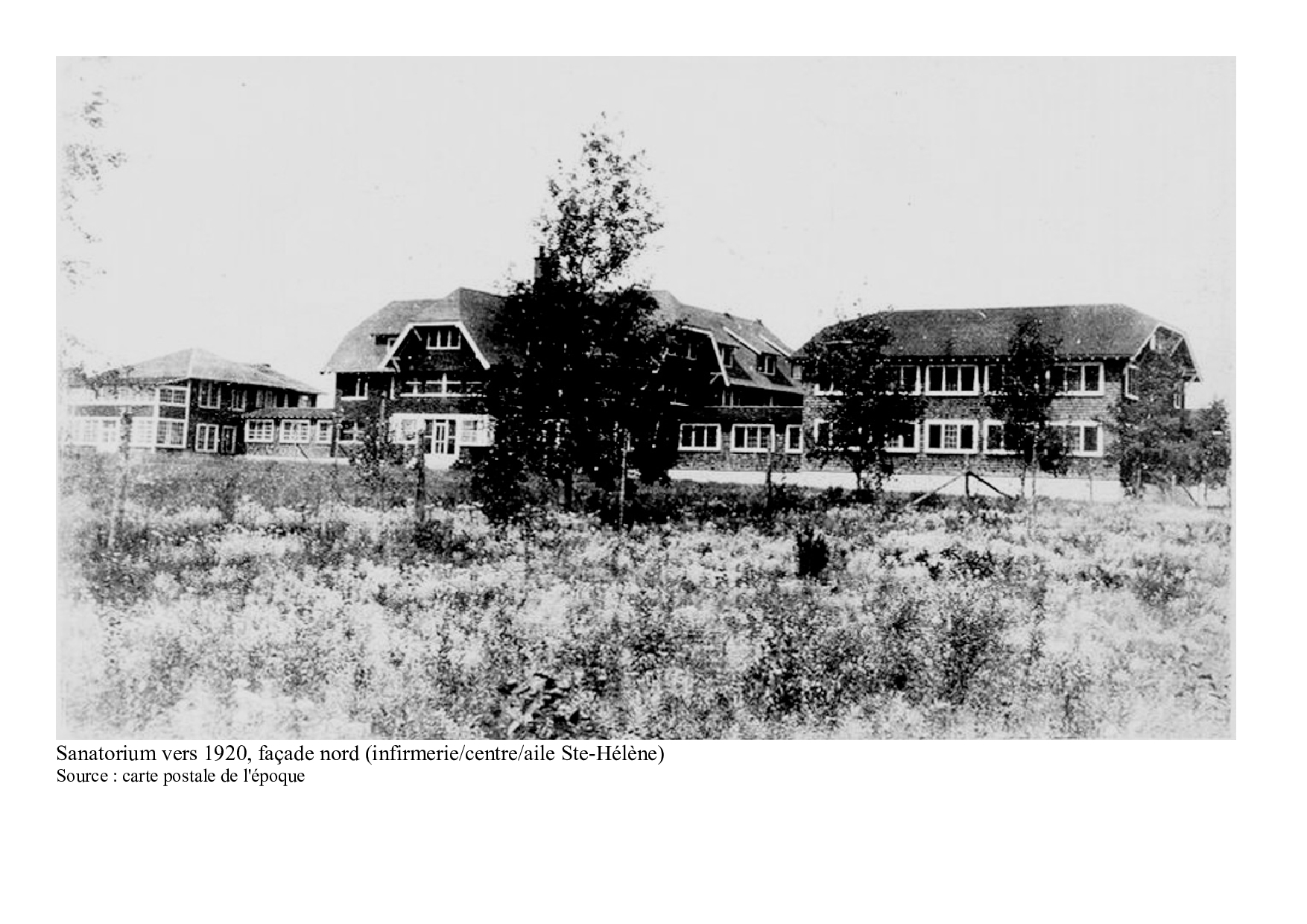
Sanatorium in late 1918

In 1915, during the first world war, the Military Hospitals Commission took charge of the sanatorium to treat the soldiers sick of tuberculosis or suffering from toxic gas. The sanatorium was expanded to receive mainly French Canadian patients. An East annex, for 75 male patients, was built in 1916; a West annex was built in 1918. The original sanatorium already had two wings and, with the two annexes, was called the "Center". In 1921, the sanatorium was transferred back to the "Lake Edward Sanatorium Association" which asked the province of Québec to take charge of the hospital complex.

== Purchase by the Provincial Government of Québec ==
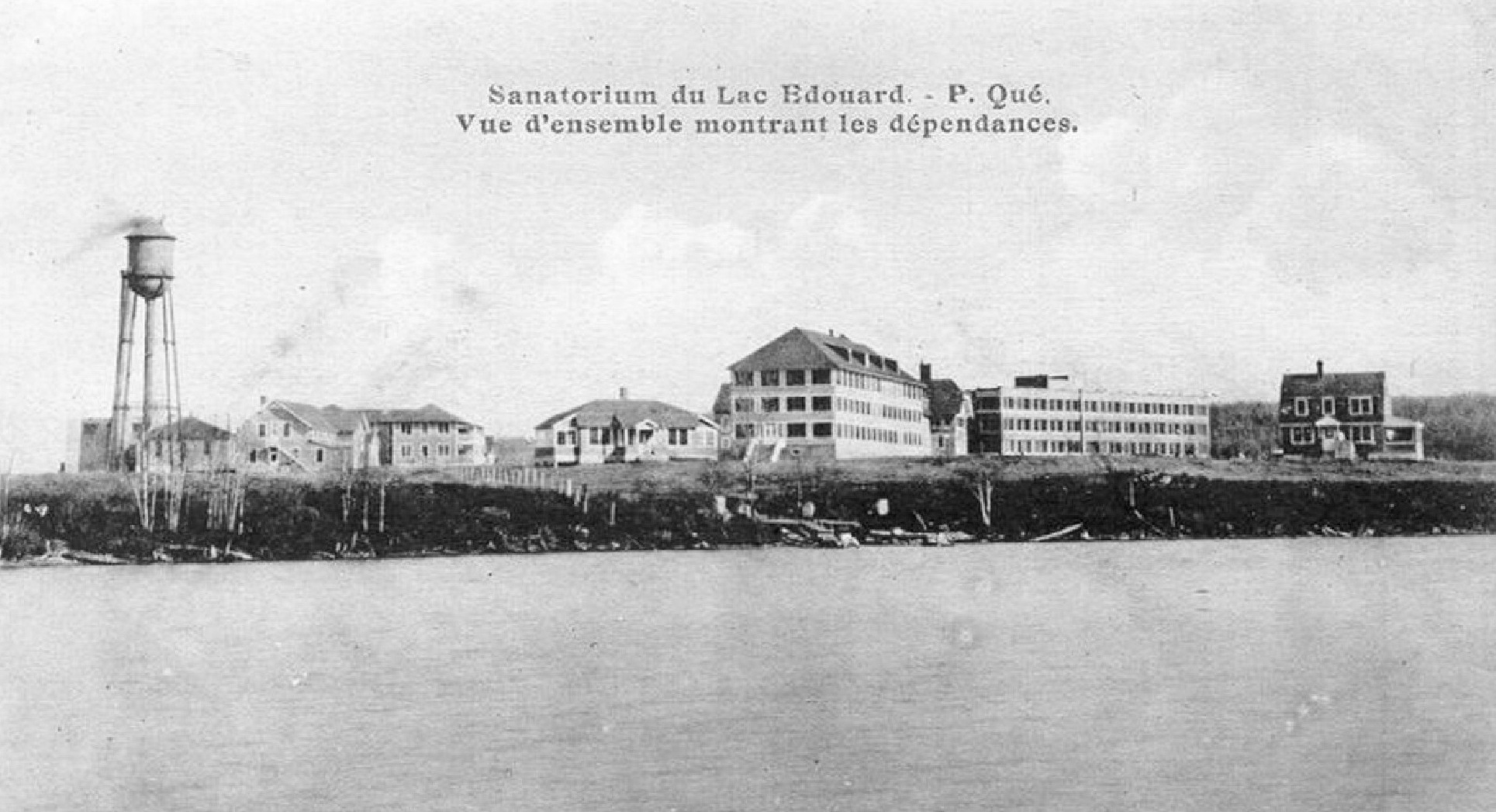
The Lake Edward Sanatorium circa 1928

In 1921, the Provincial Government of Québec purchased the sanatorium at a cost of 60,000 Canadian dollars, and transferred the administration to the Laval hospital of Québec. From 5 September 1921 to 3 February 1925, the sanatorium was operated by the "soeurs de la Charité de Québec". The "Dominicaines de l'Enfant-Jésus" took over from 1936 to 1948 and after that, the operation was secular. In 1922, the provincial Government granted 75,000 Canadian dollars to the "soeurs de la Charité" for a new construction (probably the nun's villa); on 20 February 1925, the government granted a monthly sum of 1,500 Canadian dollars for 20 years, to accommodate a maximum of 135 patients and to provide for needy patients.

This grant led to the construction projects inaugurated in 1928 (photo circa 1928). The East annex was moved and became the infirmary; in its place, the brick building of the Couillard's wing was built. The West annex was also moved and became the north part of the "Ruche" (hive); in its place the St-Helen's wing was built. The coal-fire steam heating plant was built with its tall chimney. Later, coal was replaced by oil, then by wood. A larger water tower was built and a steam pump was used to pump water from the lake through a 6" copper pipe. The potable water still came from the well at the previous water tower. Concrete tunnels were used to deliver water and steam to all the buildings. Between the nun's villa and the sanatorium, the tunnel was large enough to be used by employees during the hard winters when the temperature often drops below forty degrees. A steam turbine drove a direct current generator. In 1950, it was replaced by two alternative current generators with two diesel engines each (used alternatively) that also supplied the village until the prolongation of Hydro Québec's power lines in 1967–1968.

In 1928, the Laurentian Forest Protective Association erected a steel tower (80 foot high for forest fire detection), built a telephone line along the railway and installed a free telephone at the sanatorium; the La Tuque Telephone company will supply phone service to the village in 1966. In 1930, the sanatorium had 115 patients; the body of deceased patients was returned to their family by train (in a watertight wooden box as per railway instructions). The sanatorium will have as many as one hundred employees and more than 225 patients. Up to 1933, the patients had to pay for their hospitalisation. In October 1943, a fire destroyed St-Helen's wing and the "Center" which were made of wood; the chapel, the dining room, the pharmacy and the kitchen were destroyed (photo circa 1940). Only the brick building of the sanatorium, the Couillard's wing, survived. The service buildings included: the infirmary, the "ruche", the school, the laundry, the nun's villa and five houses for employees (of which the superintendent's house, closest to river Batiscan, is probably sir Turner's fishing camp). The farm buildings included a barn, sheds for the machinery and a green house located near the "ruche" with a vegetable garden. There was a six-door boat shed near the beach on the lake.

The superintendent had a leading role for the sanatorium. In 1909, Dr E. M. Ainsley was the first superintendent, and later there were doctors W. H. Lindsay, A. Craig and D. Falconer. From 1914 to 1936, Dr J.-Albert Couillard was the first French superintendent. He was replaced by Dr Alphonse L'Espérance and his assistant Dr Grégoire Descarreaux. In 1951, Dr Louis Rousseau took the job.

The sanatorium published a magazine for the patients, the employees and their family, named "L'étoile du San" (San's Star). It ceased publication in autumn 1963 after 275 issues. It was founded in November 1936 by Dr Alphonse l'Espérance when the publication of the magazine "Au grand air" stopped because Dr J.-A. Couillard had to quit (from first minister Duplessis's command, while Dr L'Espérance's father was a senator). A previous magazine was named "Les Bavasses" (who prattles).

== Mission change ==
In 1946, the first antibiotic against tuberculosis, streptomycin, was discovered. As the sanatorium was the main employer in the village, it kept treating tuberculosis patients up to 1967. The sanatorium was then converted as a veterans hospital and later as a rehabilitation center for physically handicapped or mentally deficient people. The center closed on 23 January 1980. A little after that, a storm destroyed the new roof of Couillard's wing and the building was abandoned.

== The vacation center ==
On 24 October 1980, the provincial government created the "Corporation Village Plein Air du Lac Édouard" (P.A.L.E.) and opened a vacation center in 1981. The wooden service buildings were used including the nun's villa. Around 1993, the GRCAO, from Montreal university, supervised the replacement of the old boilers with two new wood burning boilers as a sustainable development project. The project was probably financed by the "Programme de mise en valeur de l'environnement Chissibli-Jacques-Cartier" created by Hydro-Québec after the construction of the Bay James high voltage power lines near lake Édouard. The heated surfaces being much smaller than during the sanatorium's days, the operation of the large, high-pressure steam boiler plant wasted energy and was very costly in manpower. The vacation center closed in 2004. In 2013, the nun's villa was burned down by vandals.

== Bibliography ==
- Gagnon-Lebel, Marguerite, Si le Lac Édouard m'était conté..., Chicoutimi, 1995, 297 pages. "histoire et patrimoine" at the book citation
