= Zec Jeannotte =

- Location within Quebec
- Location: Canada, Quebec, La Tuque and Lac-Édouard, Quebec
- Nearest city: Lac-Édouard and La Tuque
- Coordinates: 47°25′00″N 72°15′51″W
- Area: 324 square kilometres (125 sq mi)
- Established: 1978
- Governing body: Association de chasse et pêche de la Batiscan (Hunting and fishing Association of the Batiscan river)

The ZEC Jeannotte is a zone d'exploitation contrôlée (Controlled harvesting area), located in Lac-Édouard, in the administrative region of Mauricie, in Quebec, in Canada.

The "Association de chasse et pêche Batiscan" (English: Hunting and fishing Association of the Batiscan river) is managing the zec.

Southern territory of the ZEC offers a mountain bike circuit and a marked snowmobile trail. These trails allow to link Rivière-à-Pierre and La Tuque via Portneuf Wildlife Reserve and Zec de la Bessonne.

== Territory ==
The territory of the ZEC Jeannotte is located thirty kilometers (direct line) at east of La Tuque. It shares its boundaries with the Zec de la Rivière-Blanche in the southwest, the Portneuf Wildlife Reserve in south and Zec de la Bessonne in the east. The territory of the ZEC is shared by the municipalities of La Tuque and Lac-Édouard.

Zec Jeannotte is located in Laurentides. It is part of the natural province of Southern Laurentians.

In terms of hydrography, all the ZEC is in the basin of the Batiscan River. The Zec is traversed by two rivers: the Batiscan River and the Jeannotte. These rivers are also very popular with fans who go down the river by canoe or kayak. The Zec includes 119 lakes.

Zec is accessible by the Route 367 through Portneuf Wildlife Reserve westerly Vermilion gate in Rivière-à-Pierre or through the Route 155 in La Tuque via Zec de la Bessonne Wayagamak gate. Zec is also accessible by train by Montreal – Jonquière train of Via Rail which crosses from south to north.

Zec includes dozens of lakes and two major rivers: Jeannotte and Batiscan. These rivers are also very popular with fans who practice whitewater canoeing and kayaking.

== See also ==
=== See also ===
- Batiscan River
- Jeannotte River
- Lac-Édouard, Quebec municipality
- Lac Édouard (Quebec), water area
- Batiscanie
- Zone d'exploitation contrôlée (Controlled harvesting zone) (ZEC)

=== External links ===
- "Official web site of Zec Jeannotte".
