= Lake Wayagamac =

Lake in Quebec, Canada

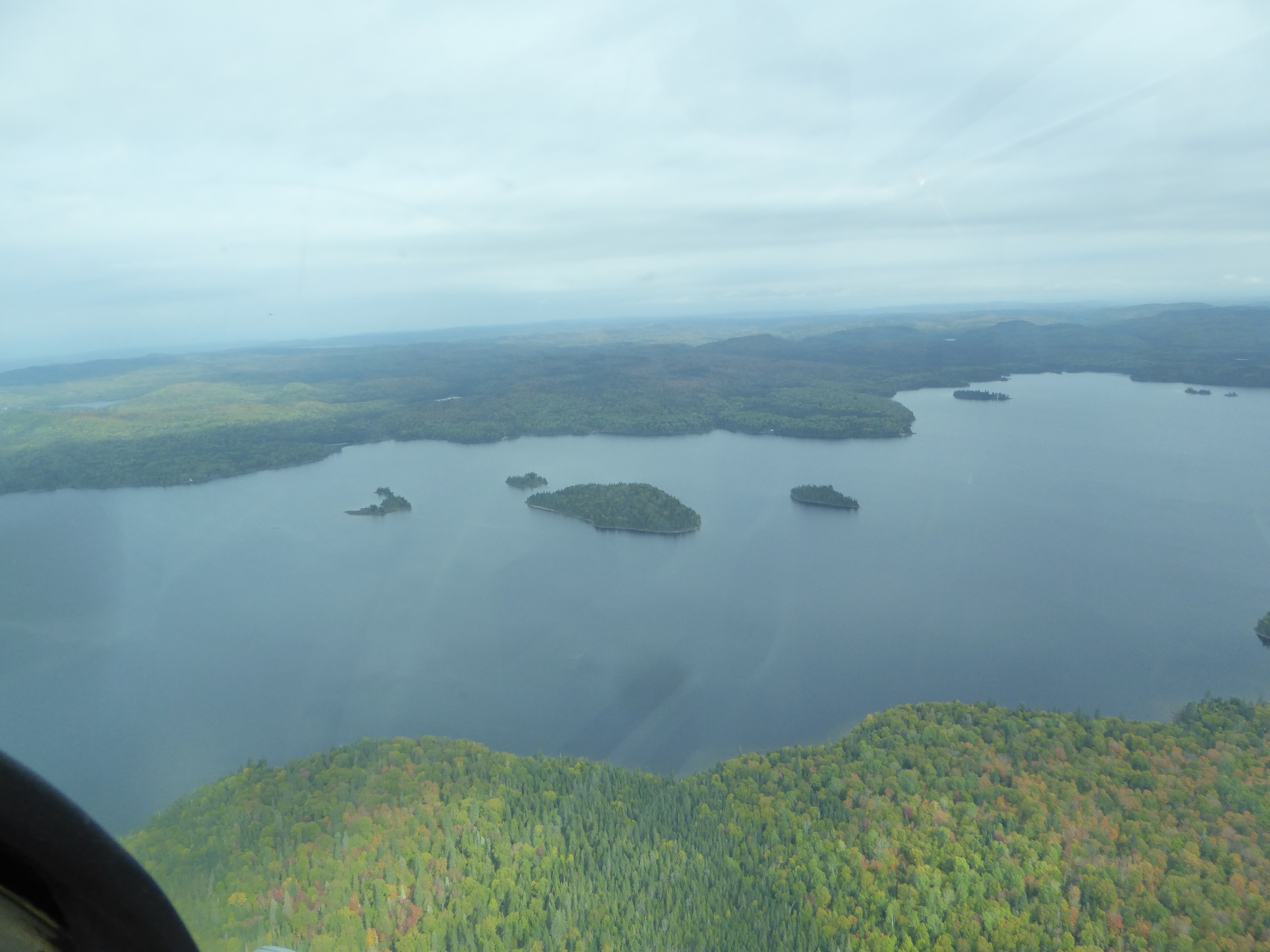

- Location within Quebec
- Location: La Tuque, Canada
- Coordinates: 47.37472°N 72.64445°W
- Type: Natural

The Wayagamac Lake is located in the city of La Tuque in La Tuque (census division), in Mauricie, in Quebec, in Canada. Until 2006, the territory of the lake was part of the former unorganized territory of Petit-Lac-Wayagamac (Little Wayagamac Lake), before being merged to the La Tuque. The area of the lake is administered by the Zec de la Bessonne.

== Geography ==
The Wayagamac lake is located 10 km (direct line) southeast of the city of La Tuque. This lake is surrounded by mountains Laurentides. With some peaks exceeding 400 meters

This Upper-Mauricie lake is segmented into three parts, the most important is the west side. It measures 9.2 km in length (east-west) and 5.9 km wide (north-south). The two main tributaries of the lake are the dumps of "Petit lac Wayagamac" (Small lake Wayagamac) (located 4.4 km to the East by the water) and Tom Lake (located 1.2 km south by water).

Little Bostonians River

From the outlet of Little Wayagamac Lake, the Little Bostonnais River course 4.4 km (measured on water) before flowing into the lake Wayagamac (southeast side). Wayagamac lake discharges from the west in the Little Bostonnais River which has an approximate length of 10.6 km (measured by water) between the dam and the Wayagamac lake. The mouth of the river flows into the Saint-Maurice River at the southern boundary of the city of La Tuque (just south of the airport). From the discharge of Little Wayagamac lake, the Little Bostonnais River water runs westbound on 23.6 km of which 8.6 km through the Wayagamac lake.

Heron colony

Like other zec of Québec, the zec de la Bessonne is not a protected area recognized by the Government of Quebec. By exception, logging and mining are permitted. A heronry and bird colony are based on Steamboat Island, located in the center of Lake Wayagamac. The lake also serves as a water intake for the La Tuque municipal water system.

Wayagamac Dam

Built in 1953, this high-capacity dam has a length of 55 m and 6 m high. It has a holding capacity of 145 million cubic meters of water. The structure is composed of casing filled with stones. The dam has borrowed its name from the lake Wayagamac. The name "Dam Wayagamac" was officially registered on May 11, 1987, at the Bank of place names in Geographical Names Board of Canada. Coordinates of the dam: Longitude West (72° 41' 50"); North Latitude: (47° 23' 02").

== Toponymy ==
According to Father G. Lemoine, the term "waweia gamak" akin to the Algonquin language and means "at Round Lake". Father Joseph-Étienne Guinard consider that "waiagamak", set for "wawiagamaw" has meaning for "Round Lake". Yet its shape is triangular rather than round. This name, in the form of Wayagamack was mentioned in 1876 in a report of the surveyor Télésphore Chavigny Of Chevrotière. As of 1913, Wayagamack identified a pulp and paper established Trois-Rivières.

The name "Lake Wayagamac" was officially registered on December 5, 1968, at the "Bank to place names" of the Commission de toponymie du Québec.

In addition, Kruger, in partnership with the Société générale de financement du Québec (SGF Rexfor), has acquired the Kruger Wayagamack factory in 2001. This plant is located on the Ile-de-la-Potherie, in Trois-Rivières.

== See also ==
- Little Bostonnais River
- Petit lac Wayagamac
- Saint-Maurice River
- La Tuque (urban agglomeration)
- La Tuque, Quebec
- Mauricie
- Zec de la Bessonne
