= Zec de la Bessonne =

- Location within Quebec
- Location: La Tuque, in Mauricie, in Quebec, in Canada
- Nearest city: La Tuque
- Coordinates: 47°23′N 72°31′W
- Area: 524.5 square kilometres (202.5 sq mi)
- Established: 1978
- Governing body: Association Épervier de La Tuque inc

The Zec de la Bessonne is a "zone d'exploitation contrôlée" (controlled harvesting area) (ZEC) near La Tuque in administrative region of Mauricie, in Quebec, in Canada. A territory of 524.5 square kilometres (202.5 sq mi) was assigned in 1978 to the Zec.

The Zec is managed by the Association Épervier de La Tuque inc (Association Hawk of La Tuque inc). It takes its name from a former private hunting club which was abolished upon creating the Zec.

== Geography ==
Zec de la Bessonne is a land of 524.5 square kilometres (202.5 sq mi), located in Mauricie, in La Tuque (urban agglomeration). Its territory is shared by the city of La Tuque and municipalities La Bostonnais, Quebec and Lac-Edouard. It is bordered to the east by the Zec Jeannotte, Québec and Portneuf Wildlife Reserve, and to the south by Zec Tawachiche. It is located at 10 kilometres (6.2 mi) east of downtown La Tuque.

The territory is crossed by six rivers, including the Little Bostonnais River, the Jeannotte River and Rivière du milieu (Mékinac). Zec includes 281 lakes, including Lake Wayagamac, which provides drinking water to the city of La Tuque.

== Land protection ==
Zec de la Bessonne is not a protected area recognized by the Government of Quebec, like all other ZECs; forestry and mining are allowed. However, the island "Steamboat" is recognized as a heronry and bird colony, and is located in the center of Lake Wayagamac.

== Toponymy ==
The term "Bessonne" identifying a river, two lakes, one island, a dam and a zec (controlled harvesting zone) are related. These toponyms derivate from the name of the river.

The toponym "Zec de la Bessonne" was officialized on August 5, 1982 at the Bank of Names Places of Commission de toponymie du Québec (Geographical Names Places of Quebec).

== See also ==
- Mékinac Lake
- Lac-Masketsi, Quebec, unorganized territory
- Zone d'exploitation contrôlée (Controlled Harvesting Zone) (ZEC)
