= Little Bostonnais River =

Coordinates: 47.3781°N 72.7908°W

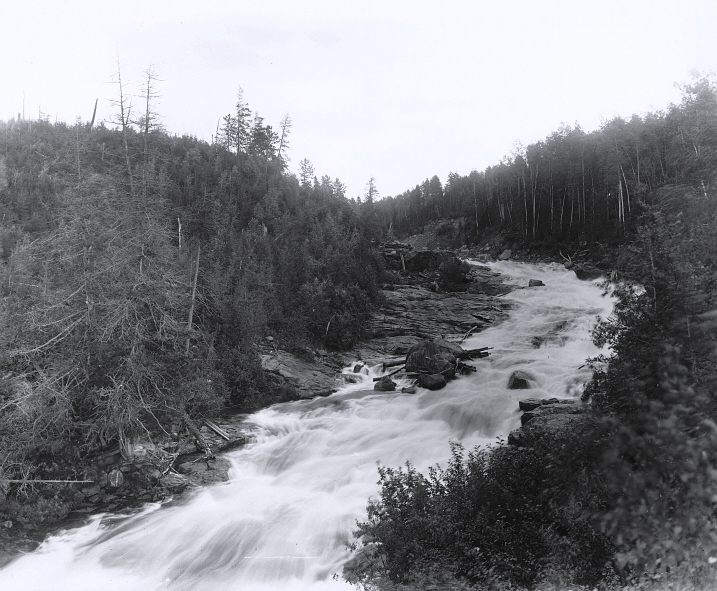
- Little Bostonnais River Falls near La Tuque, 1916

Location
- Country: Canada

Physical characteristics
- Source
  - location: Little Wayagamac Lake
- Mouth
  - location: Saint-Maurice River
- Length: 23.6 km (14.7 mi)
- Basin size: 334 km^{2} (129 sq mi)

The Little Bostonnais river flows westbound in the city of La Tuque, in Mauricie, in Quebec, in Canada.

== Geography ==
From the mouth of Little Wayagamac Lake, Little Bostonnais River runs on 4.4 km (measured on water) before emptying into the Lake Wayagamac (at the east-south side). The Lake Wayagamac discharges at the north-west side (at the bottom of a bay) where a dam was built. The lake drains into Little Bostonnais River which has an approximate length of 10.6 km (measured on water) between the dam of Lake Wayagamac and its mouth.

From the "Wayagamac lake dam", the river flows northwest through a small lake (located at the south-east of Highway 155). Then at the limit of La Tuque, the river forks to 90 degrees towards the south, almost in parallel to the boulevard Ducharme. Having crossed this last road, the river flows into a beautiful waterfall around which the "Parc des Chutes de la Petite Rivière Bostonians" was built.

This small river empties into the Saint-Maurice River, in front of "La longue île" (Long Island), at the southern edge of the city of La Tuque (just south of the airport). From the outlet of Little Wayagamac Lake, the Little Bostonnais River flows westward on 23.6 km, including 8.6 km across the Lake Wayagamac.

The mouth of the Bostonnais River is located 4 km upstream from the mouth of the "Little River Bostonians". The city of La Tuque is enclosed between the two rivers and the Saint-Maurice River (west side).

From the outlet of Little Lake Wayagamac, Little River flows west Bostonnais on 23.6 km, including 8.6 km around the Lake Wayagamac.

== Park of the Falls of Little Bostonnais River ==
At the very end of it course, and after crossing the boulevard Ducharme (in the southern part of the city of La Tuque), the water of the Little Bostonnais River flows in the falls of a height of 30 m. The city of La Tuque erected a municipal park around the falls. Using lookouts and hiking trails, waterfalls are of great beauty for visitors. In summer, they can use the picnic areas, practice cycling (12 km), go hiking (5 km), observe the flora, canoe, use the playground and participate in guided tours in French. In winter, visitors can make slides, cross-country skiing, ice skating, snowmobiling ... Visitors can also visit the Centre and the circuit Félix-Leclerc.

== Toponymy ==
The names Bostonnais River and "Little River Bostonians" are commemorating Jean-Baptiste Bostonians, a trapper Abenaki who came from Boston, Massachusetts.

== See also ==
- La Tuque (city)
- Saint-Maurice River
- Lake Wayagamac
