= Lake Édouard (Quebec) =

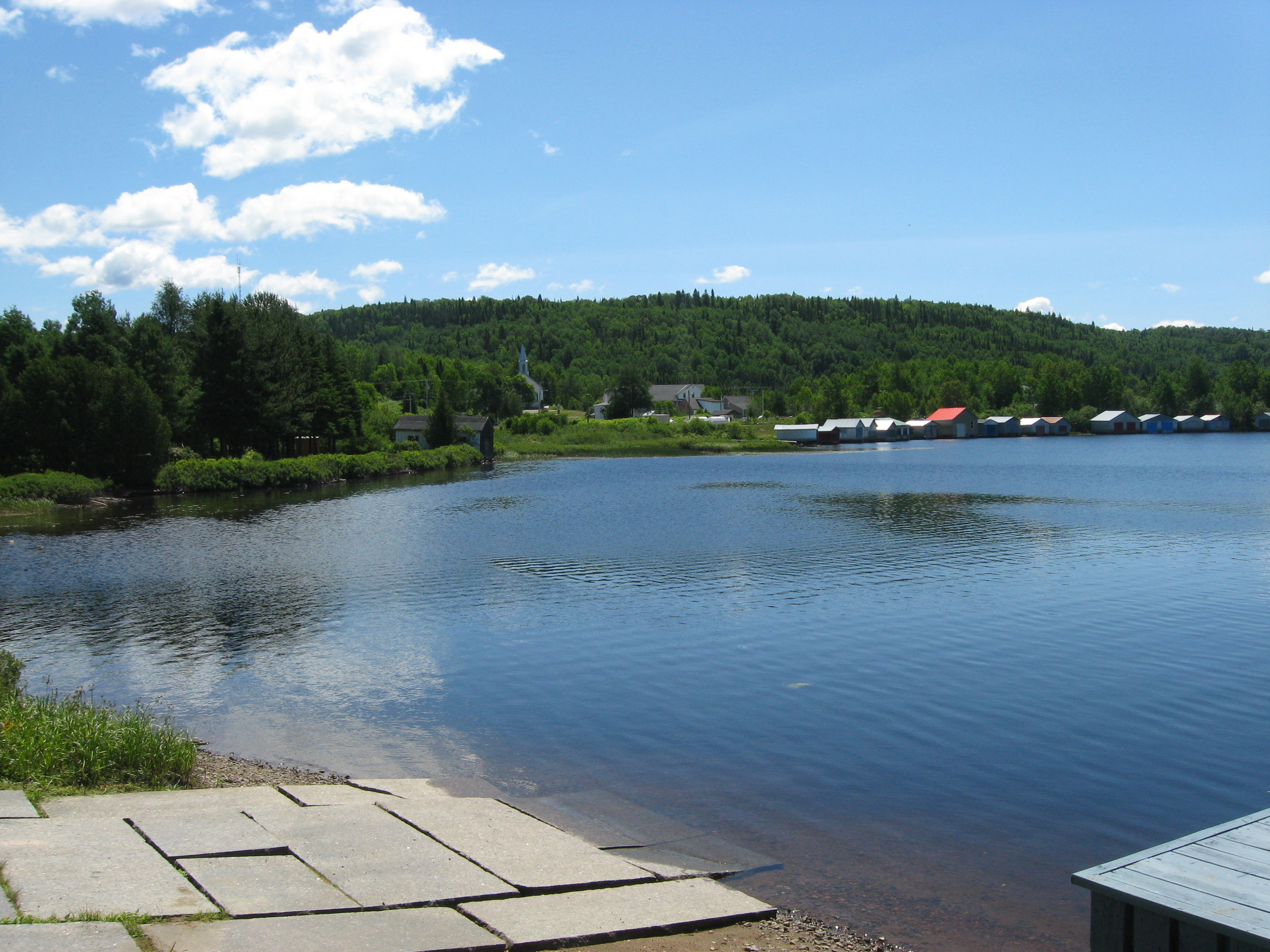
- Lake Édouard near the village of Lac-Édouard

- Location within Quebec
- Location: Quebec in Canada
- Coordinates: 47°36′44″N 72°21′43″W
- Lake type: natural lake
- Primary outflows: Batiscan River and Jeannotte River
- Basin countries: Canada
- Max. length: 25 km (16 mi)
- Surface elevation: 363 m (1,191 ft)
- Settlements: Lac-Edouard, Quebec

The Lake Édouard (French pronunciation: [lak edwaʁ]) is a lake in Canada, in province of Quebec, in the municipality of Lac-Édouard in the administrative region of Mauricie. The entire area of this lake is located in the municipality of Lac-Édouard.

== Geography ==
This lake is the head of the valley of the Batiscanie, Quebec. This lake has the distinction of having two emissaries: Batiscan River and Jeannotte River. The main tributary of the lake is the Rats River whose headwater lake is Rats Lake; the river flows north-east before turning south to empty into the Rats Bay, located in the western part of the lake. The lake has several other bays, such as Power, the Bouquet, Great Bay, Steamboat, Round and Gull Rock.

Lake Édouard has several islands including the three largest that are located southwest of Lake: Hoffman Island, the island Turner and Ziegfeld.

Ecological Reserve Judith de Brésoles is situated on the east side of the lake, around the "Lac Mauvais" (lake Wrong). The Zec Besonne is located in the southern part of the lake, close to the Zec Jeannotte.

The village of Lac-Édouard, Quebec is located in the northeast of the lake, near the mouth that flows into a series of lake forming head to the Batiscan.

== Toponymy ==
Its name is in use since 1828 by the surveyor Joseph Bouchette and would come from Édouard Jeannotte, a trapper living in Batiscan, a parish at the mouth of Batiscan River. The lake's name is also attested in Montagnais language as "Etoolsakigan", which also means "Lac Édouard".

== History ==
The forestry industry was very important around Lac Édouard, since the arrival of the train in the 1890. The loggers were active on the lake to transport timber to the sawmill with pulling boats with cables surrounding floating logs. In 1901, a terrible forest fire destroy the forest around the lake and forced the lay-off for 1000 workers of the Lac-Édouard sawmill.

== See also ==
- Lac-Édouard, Quebec, municipality
- Batiscanie
- Batiscan River
- La Tuque

== Sources ==
- Lake Edward - Directory of Quebec Municipalities
- Commission de toponymie du Québec (Geographical Names Board of Québec
