= Jeannotte River =

River in Quebec, Canada

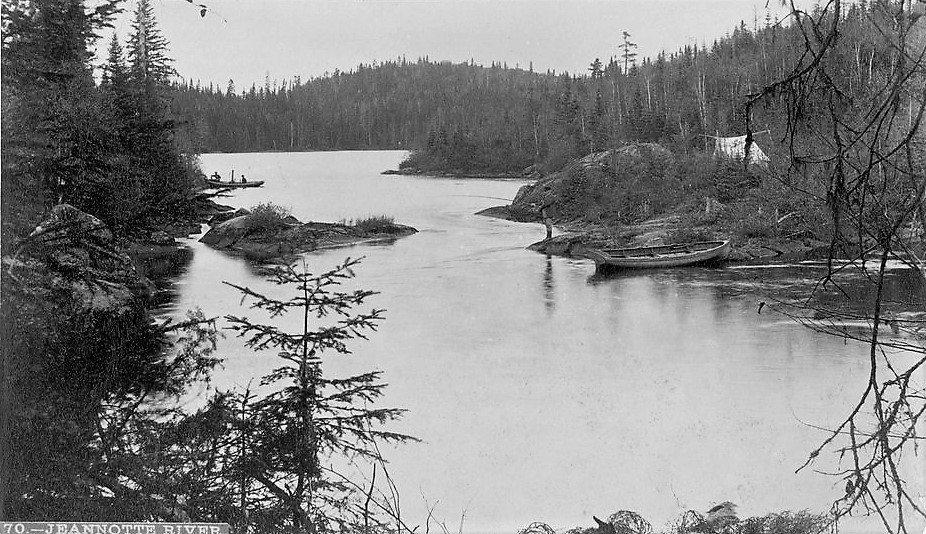

Location
- Country: Canada
- Province: Quebec
- Region: Mauricie
- City: La Tuque

Physical characteristics
- Source: Lake Édouard
  - location: Lac-Édouard
  - coordinates: 47°31′33″N 72°22′08″W
  - elevation: 363
- Mouth: Batiscan River
  - location: Lac-Édouard
  - coordinates: 47°16′40″N 72°15′28″W
  - elevation: 280 m
- Length: 48 km (30 mi)
- Basin size: 560 km^{2} (220 sq mi)

Basin features
- Tributaries
  - left: (Upward from the mouth)
  - right: (Upward from the mouth)

Jeannotte River (French pronunciation: [ʒanɔt]) is a river that rises in Lac Édouard in the municipality of Lac-Édouard in Haute-Mauricie, agglomerated with the city of La Tuque since 2003, in the administrative region of Mauricie, in the province of Quebec, Canada. The head of the Jeannotte River is one of the two emissaries of Lake Edward (outfall located in the southern part of Lake Edward, in 2.6 kilometres (1.6 mi) of the village while the other envoy, the head of the Batiscan River, is near the village, near the former sanatorium). The Jeannotte River, whose course is 48 kilometres (30 mi), is in the valley of the Batiscanie, Quebec. The upper segment of the path of the Jeannotte River marks the Zec de la Bessonne and Zec Jeannotte, then the river flows through the Zec Jeannotte, incorporated in 1978.

== Course ==
From "Lac de la grande baie" (Lake of the Great Bay) (adjacent to the southern part of Lake Edward) in Township Bickerdike, the Jeannotte River flows in the north-south direction in the wild and mountainous area near several small lakes (listed in order from head river):

a. Township Bickerdike:

- Lake Zoe.

b. Township Charest:

- Lake Orleans
- Lake of Peace
- Lake of the Beaten.

c. Township Laurier

- Beaver Lake, is formed very elongated, with a bulge in the river Jeannotte way
- Lake shortcut
- Belle Lake Trout
- Lake Bradley
- Lac au Lard,
- Lake Vermilion. Note: At this point, the Jeannotte river bifurcates of 90 degrees to head east toward the Batiscan River.

The last 9.5 kilometres (5.9 mi) of the river course are in the territory of Portneuf Wildlife Reserve. The upper river is normally navigable, only the last four kilometers include rapid considered more difficult for boating. The mouth of the Jeannotte River is in the Portneuf Wildlife Reserve, 1 kilometre (0.62 mi) downstream of the Ile aux merisiers (island-the-wild-cherry) and about 7 kilometres (4.3 mi) upstream from the Ile à la Croix (island to the Cross), on the Batiscan River (or 8.5 kilometres (5.3 mi) upstream of Linton, on the other bank, along the railway track).

== Major tributaries ==
The main tributaries of the Jeannotte River are (starting from the head of the river):

Right bank:

- Outlet of Lake Shiragoo,
- Outlet of Lake Orleans,
- Vermillion River
- Discharge of the Beautiful Trout Lake,
- Bacon Creek Lake.

Left Bank:

- Outlet of Lake Zoe
- Discharge of Lake Dorval,
- Discharge of Lake Shortcut
- River of kidneys.

== Toponymy ==
The Jeannotte name originates from an aboriginal hunter of the parish of Batiscan, Edward Jeannotte, who accompanied the surveyor Joseph Bouchette (junior) on an expedition of recognition in the territories of Upper Mauricie in 1828, including their visit to Lake Edward. The name "Jeannotte River" was registered at the Commission de toponymie du Québec (Geographical Names Board of Quebec) on December 5, 1968.

== See also ==
- Batiscanie
- Batiscan River
- List of rivers of Quebec
