= Lac-Édouard, Quebec =

Lac-Édouard
- Municipality
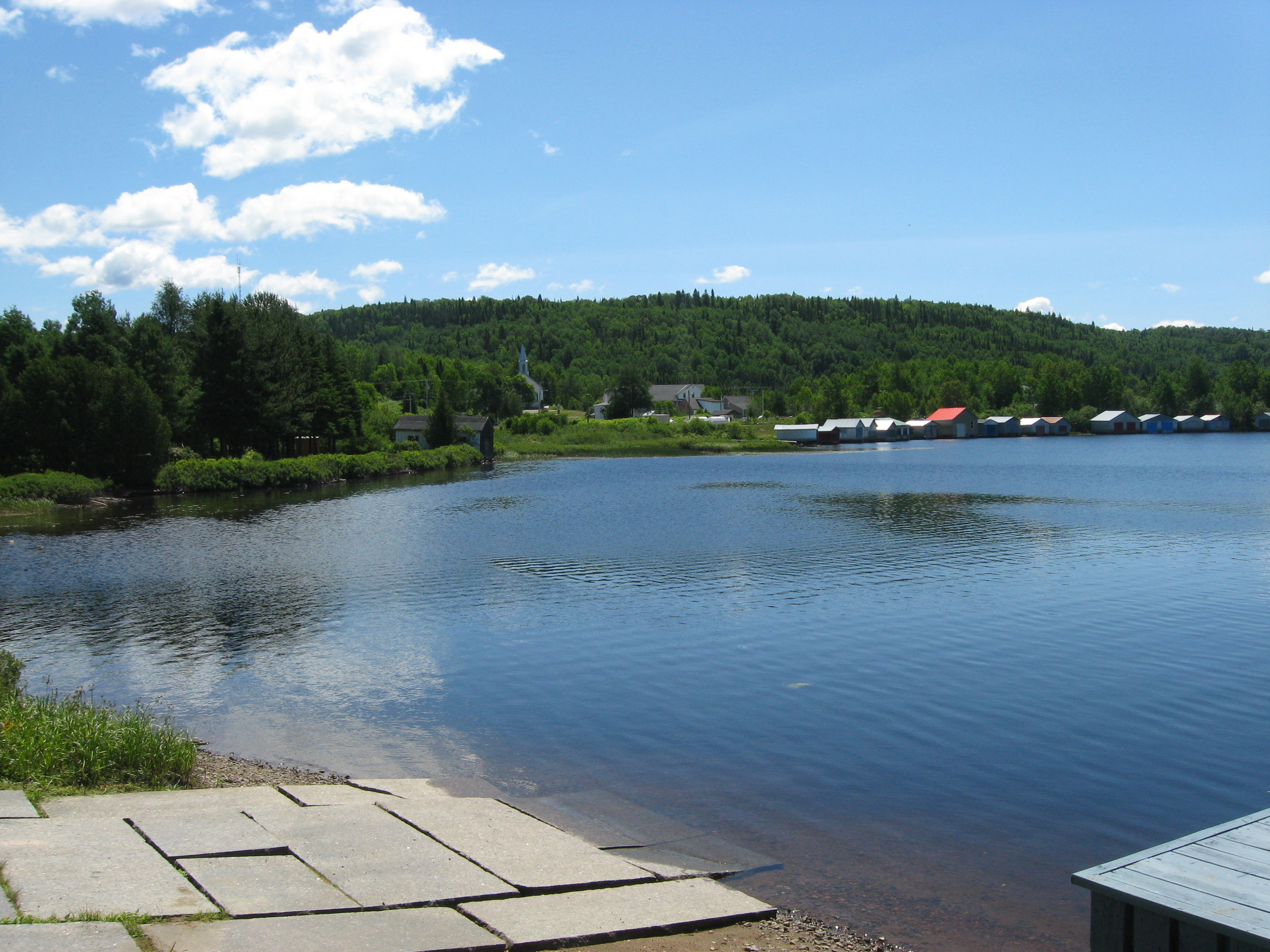

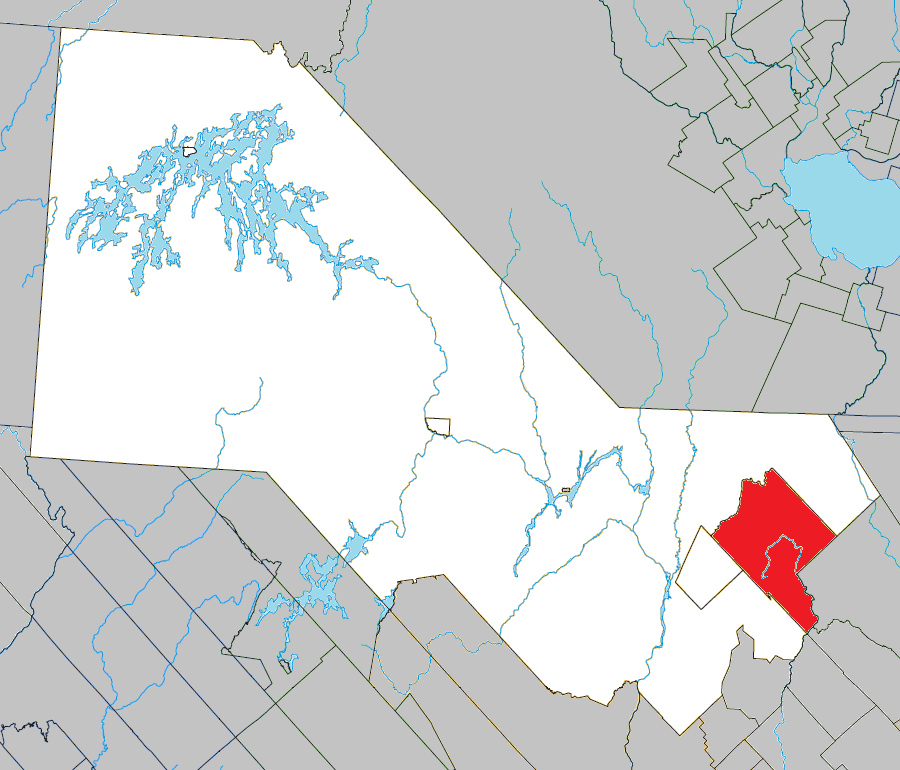
- Location within La Tuque TE

- Location in central Quebec
- Coordinates: 47°39′N 72°16′W
- Country: Canada
- Province: Quebec
- Region: Mauricie
- RCM: None
- Agglomeration: La Tuque
- Constituted: January 1, 2006

Government
  - Mayor: Larry Bernier
  - Federal riding: Saint-Maurice—Champlain
  - Prov. riding: Laviolette

Area
  - Total: 987.10 km^{2} (381.12 sq mi)
  - Land: 898.32 km^{2} (346.84 sq mi)

Population (2021)
  - Total: 220
  - Density: 0.2/km^{2} (0.52/sq mi)
  - Pop 2016-2021: ▲15.2%
  - Dwellings: 298
- Time zone: UTC−5 (EST)
  - Summer (DST): UTC−4 (EDT)
- Postal code(s): G0X 3N0
- Area code: 819
- Highways: R-155
- Website: www.lacedouard.ca

Lac-Édouard (French pronunciation: [lak edwaʁ]) is a municipality in the Mauricie region of the province of Quebec in Canada. Its village centre is located along the Canadian National Railway at the north end of the namesake Lake Édouard.

On March 26, 2003, it became part of the City of La Tuque as part of the early 2000s municipal reorganization in Quebec, but following a 2004 referendum, the Municipalities of La Bostonnais and Lac-Édouard were reconstituted on January 1, 2006. It remains part of the urban agglomeration of La Tuque. It had formerly been part of Le Haut-Saint-Maurice Regional County Municipality, which was abolished in the wake of the merger; after demerger, it is one of the few municipalities (other than in the Nord-du-Québec region) that is not part of any regional county municipality.

== History ==
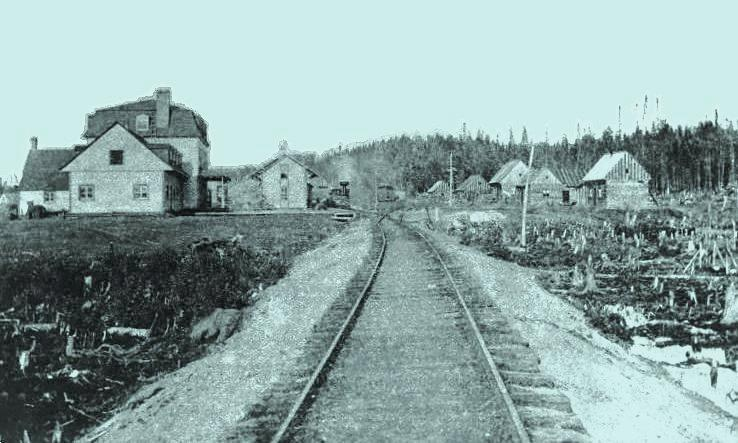
Lac-Edouard in 1910

The name of Lake Édouard, which was recorded since 1828 by the surveyor Joseph Bouchette, honours Native American hunter Edouard Jeannotte. Another surveyor, J. P. Mullarkey, wrote in 1893 that hunter Edouard Jeannotte had also given its name to the Jeannotte River, one of the two tributaries of the lake. The lake's name is also attested in Montagnais language using the toponym "Etoolsakigan", which also means Lake Edouard.

The history of Lake Edward begins with the construction of the Quebec and lake St-John Railway in 1885, which connects Montreal to Lac Saint-Jean. The presence of lakes and wildlife areas attracted the rich Americans and prompted the construction of the Lac-Edouard railway station in 1886, a post office and a Catholic mission in 1889.

In 1886, Lake Edward became home to the newly founded Triton Fish and Game Club (today the Seigneurie du Triton). The hunting and fishing club was well-known in Quebec and received several notable members such as Winston Churchill (prime minister of the England) and American presidents such as Theodore Roosevelt and Harry Truman, as well as family members of Rockefeller and Molson.

The remoteness of Lac-Edouard also led to the creation of a sanatorium in 1904. The parish of Notre-Dame-des-Neiges was created in 1937 and the place received municipal status in 1951. However, the development of antibiotics led to the closure of the sanatorium in 1967.

In 2003, Lac-Edouard was merged with La Tuque; however, this merger was challenged and the municipality was restored in 2006.

=== Administrative chronology ===
- 1889 - Proclamation creating Trudel township
- 1891 - Proclamation creating Laure township
- 1901 - Proclamation creating Bickerdike township
- 1904 - Proclamation creating Gendron township
- 1 - Constitution of the municipality of Lac-Edouard from the entire territory of the townships Bickerdike, Gendron, Laura and Trudel.
- 26 - Lac-Édouard is fused to La Tuque
- 1 - Reconstruction of the City of Lac-Edouard in the former territory of 1951.

=== Sanatorium ===
The sanatorium of Lac-Édouard, which had been in operation from 1904 to 1967, contributed greatly to the local economy. The five historic buildings on the site were built between 1910 and 1926. Tunnels built in cement were used in particular to get the pipes coming from the boiler and from raised huge reservoir of drinking water. The main tunnel was used for the movement of personnel, supplies and, if necessary, to remove the dead bodies from the hospital.

The primary purpose of the sanatorium was to house and treat tuberculosis patients. This infectious disease, with variable clinical signs, was once treated in sanatoriums, for cures under the sun and outdoors activities. The disease was much better controlled in the 1950s, thanks to newly discovered antibiotics. Subsequently cures to sanatoriums in the fight against tuberculosis became less and less necessary.

Located on a point of land jutting out into the Lac Edouard, the site of the sanatorium and outbuildings was well equipped. The natural setting, on the edge of the lake, attracted beneficiaries, generally wealthy. They arrived by train at the Lac-Edouard railway station by train, from Hervey-Jonction, Quebec or Chambord. A shuttle was required between the railway station and the sanatorium. Many visitors were coming by train to see their sick relatives or friends living at the sanatorium. Many beneficiaries of the sanatorium died there during its history.

After 1967, the sanatorium served as a hospital dedicated to military veterans. Then, the building was transformed into a center for people with intellectual disabilities. Finally, the sanatorium was closed in 1982 and abandoned, thus weakening the local economy. The building of the sanatorium had four floors (wearing a turret as the fifth floor), with a solid concrete structure, exterior walls in red brick and many windows all around. Religious and lay staff nursed hundreds of resident beneficiaries. Doctors, nurses and support staff were housed in adjacent buildings or houses in the village of Lac-Édouard. After 1982, this historic site (except the sanatorium) continued to be used for several years for tourist activities. Finally, the site became a ghost town.

On the night of May 10 to 11, 2013, a fire completely destroyed the building of the house of nuns, located a few hundred metres from the sanatorium. This large house had a large atrium, two stories high, at the entrance. The rooms of the nuns were furnished on the second floor.

In 2006, businessman Jean-Guy Pronovost from Trois-Rivières acquired the site and outdoor base from Ministry of Natural Resources and Wildlife.

== Demographics ==
Canada census – Lac-Édouard community profile

	2021	2016	2011
Population	220 (+15.2% from 2016)	191 (9.1% from 2011)	175 (12.9% from 2006)
Land area	898.32 km^{2} (346.84 sq mi)	916.50 km^{2} (353.86 sq mi)	916.12 km^{2} (353.72 sq mi)
Population density	0.2/km^{2} (0.52/sq mi)	0.2/km^{2} (0.52/sq mi)	0.2/km^{2} (0.52/sq mi)
Median age	60.8 (M: 63.2, F: 58.4)	59.3 (M: 59.6, F: 58.8)	57.8 (M: 59.3, F: 56.7)
Private dwellings	298 (total) 118 (occupied)	300 (total)	495 (total)
Median household income		$47,488

References: 2021 2016 2011

Historical census populations
Year	Pop.	±%
1986	159	—
1991	159	+0.0%
1996	155	−2.5%
2001	137	−11.6%
2006	155	+13.1%
2011	175	+12.9%
2016	191	+9.1%
2021	220	+15.2%
Source: Statistics Canada: 1996, 2001, 2006, 2011, 2016, 2021 census

Private dwellings occupied by usual residents: 118 (total dwellings: 298)

Mother tongue:

- English as first language: 0%
- French as first language: 97.7%
- English and French as first language: 0%
- Other as first language: 0%

== See also ==
- Batiscanie
- Batiscan River
