= Rivière au Lard =

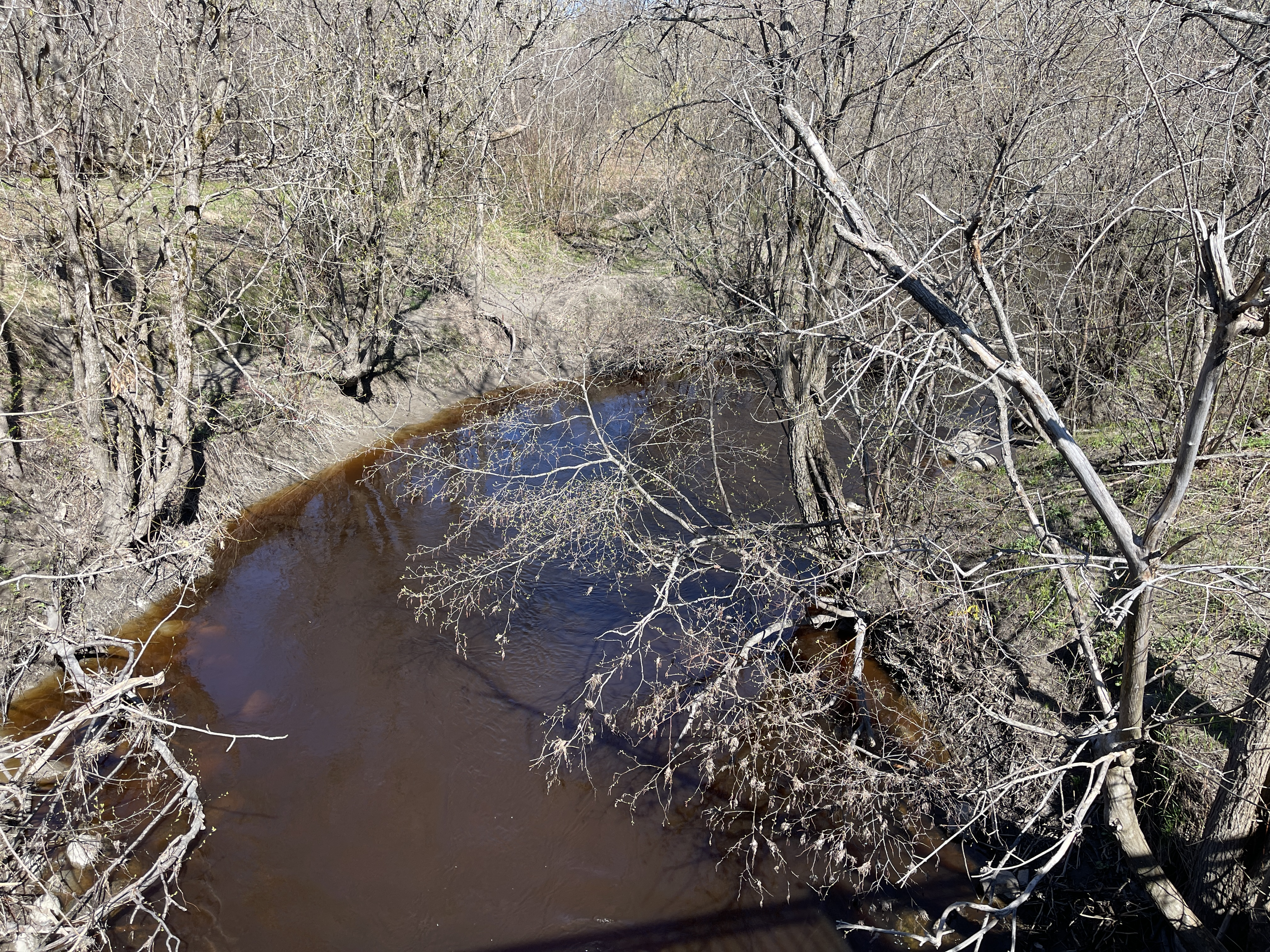
- Rang St-Alexis, Saint-Maurice, Quebec

- Location within Quebec

Location
- Country: Canada
- Province: Quebec
- Region: Mauricie

Physical characteristics
- Source: Massicotte Lake
  - location: Notre-Dame-du-Mont-Carmel, Les Chenaux Regional County Municipality, Mauricie administrative region, Quebec, Canada
  - coordinates: 46°30′01″N 72°35′30″W
  - elevation: 103 m (338 ft)
- Mouth: Champlain River
  - location: Saint-Luc-de-Vincennes, Les Chenaux Regional County Municipality
  - coordinates: 46°26′51″N 72°30′02″W
  - elevation: 29 m (95 ft)
- Length: 21.2 km (13.2 mi)

The rivière au Lard (English: Bacon River) flows on 21.2 kilometres (13.2 mi) in the municipality of Notre-Dame-du-Mont-Carmel, then those of Saint-Maurice, Saint-Narcisse and Saint-Luc-de-Vincennes, in the Les Chenaux Regional County Municipality, in the administrative region of Mauricie, in Quebec, in Canada.

== Geography ==
The Rivière au Lard rises in the marshes east of Lac Valmont in the municipality of Notre-Dame-du-Mont-Carmel.

After recovering two streams, the river heads 4.2 kilometres (2.6 mi) to the east and crosses the boundary of the municipality of Saint-Maurice. It then flows on 2.4 kilometres (1.5 mi) to cross the road near the Désilets lake. It then travels 1.7 kilometres (1.1 mi) eastwards to cross the limit of Saint-Narcisse where it makes a short foray of 0.9 kilometres (0.56 mi), branching south to return to flow in Saint-Maurice on 2.4 kilometres (1.5 mi). She then crosses the road near the hamlet Radnor-des-Forges.

The route then descends on 3.9 kilometres (2.4 mi) to route 352, northeast of the village of Saint-Maurice. From there, the river descends to the southeast, first on 1.3 kilometres (0.81 mi) to collect the Gagnon stream, then 2.0 kilometres (1.2 mi) to the Cordon stream and 1.5 kilometres (0.93 mi) to cross the road along the Champlain River on the north side. It then travels 0.9 kilometres (0.56 mi) to its mouth.

The waters of the Rivière au Lard flow into the Champlain River, at Saint-Maurice, 3.4 kilometres (2.1 mi) northeast of the route 352 and 1.4 kilometres (0.87 mi) from the limit of the Cap-de-la-Madeleine sector of the city of Trois-Rivières. The start of its 21.2 kilometres (13.2 mi) route is mainly in the forest, while the end is in the agricultural area.

== Photos ==
Rivière au Lard (rivière Champlain), Saint-Maurice, Quebec

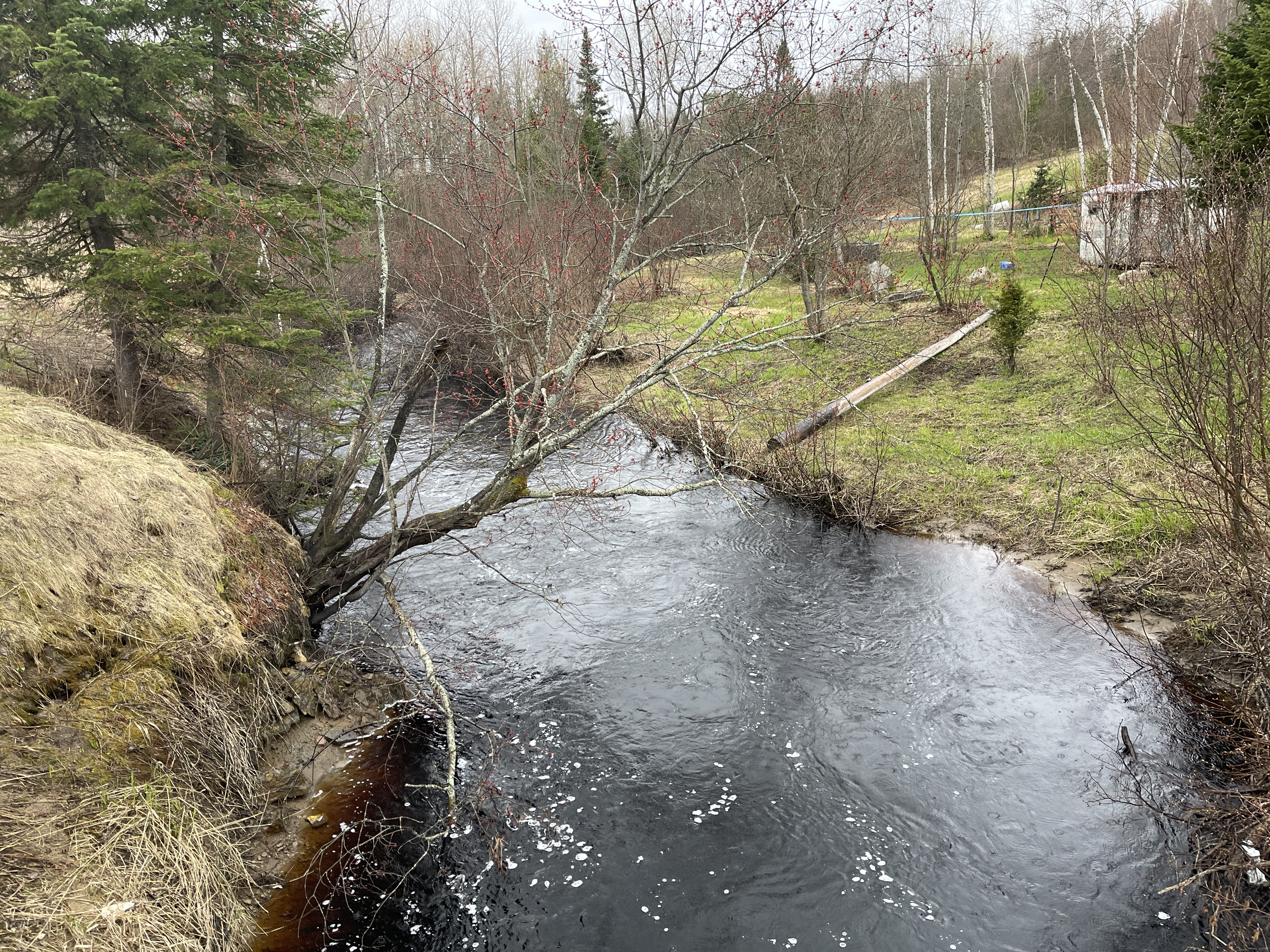
Rang St-Félix, from bridge des Ours (01578)

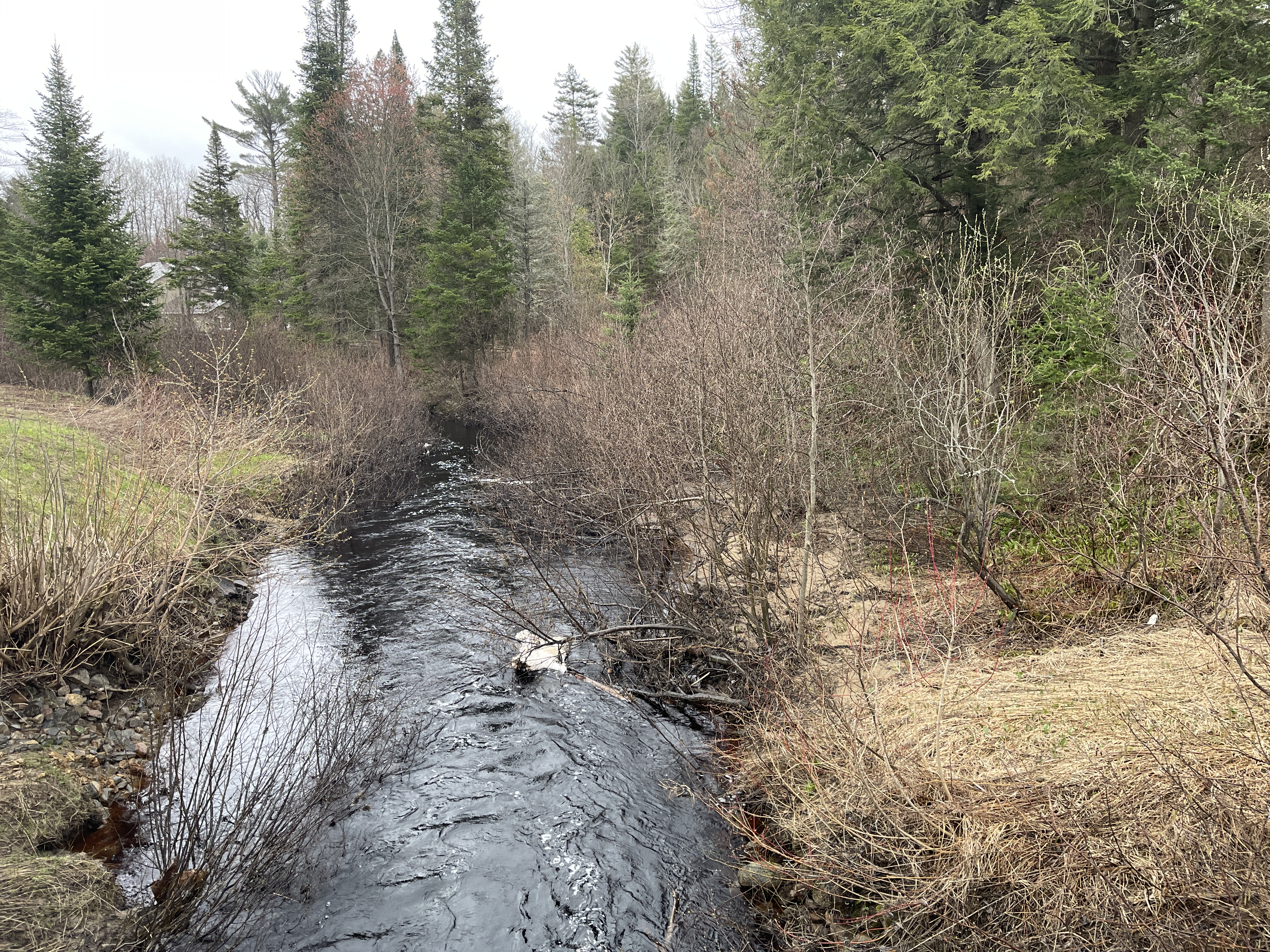
Rang St-Felix, from bridge des Ours (01578)

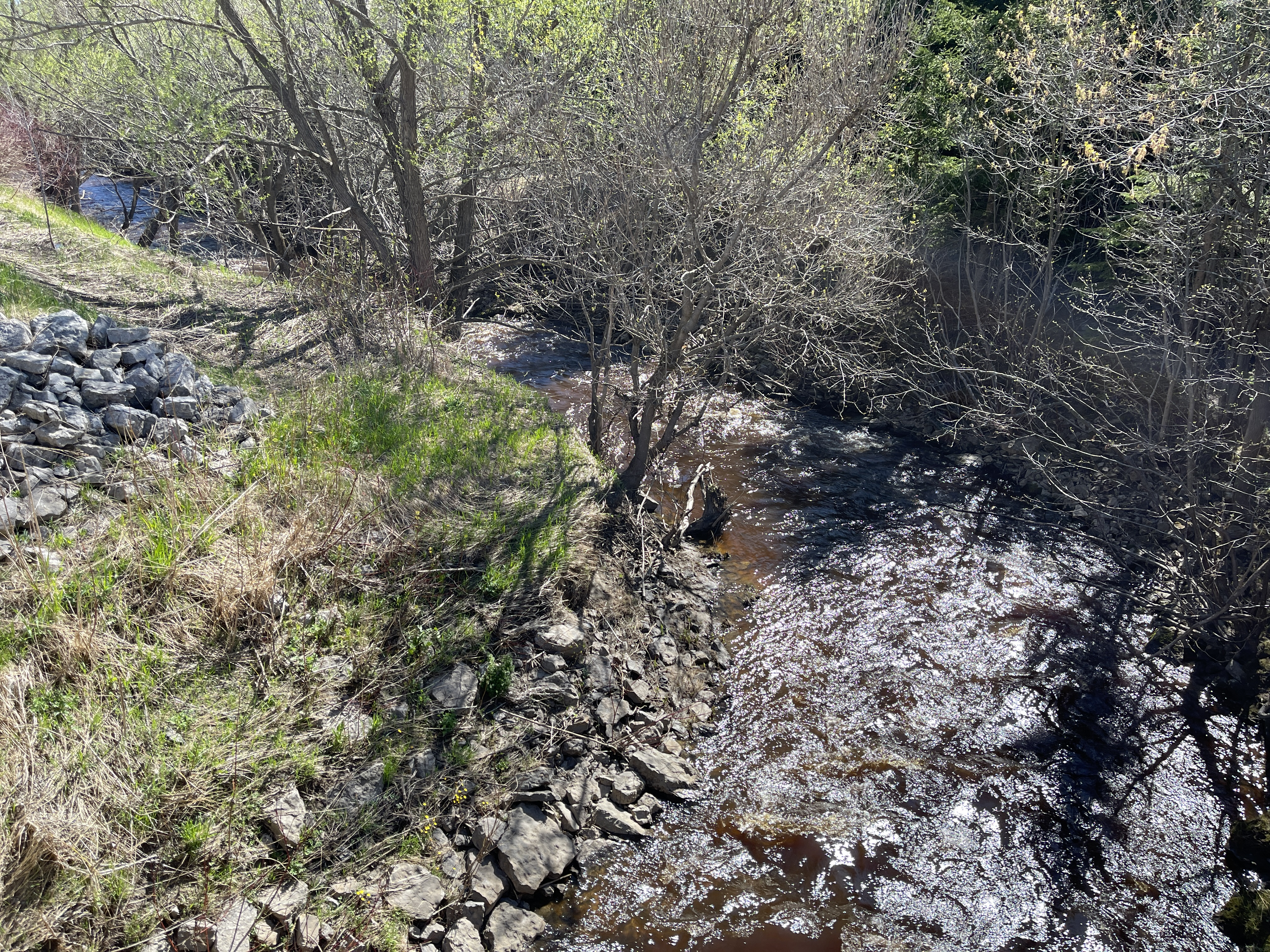
Rang St-Alexis, from bridge 01576

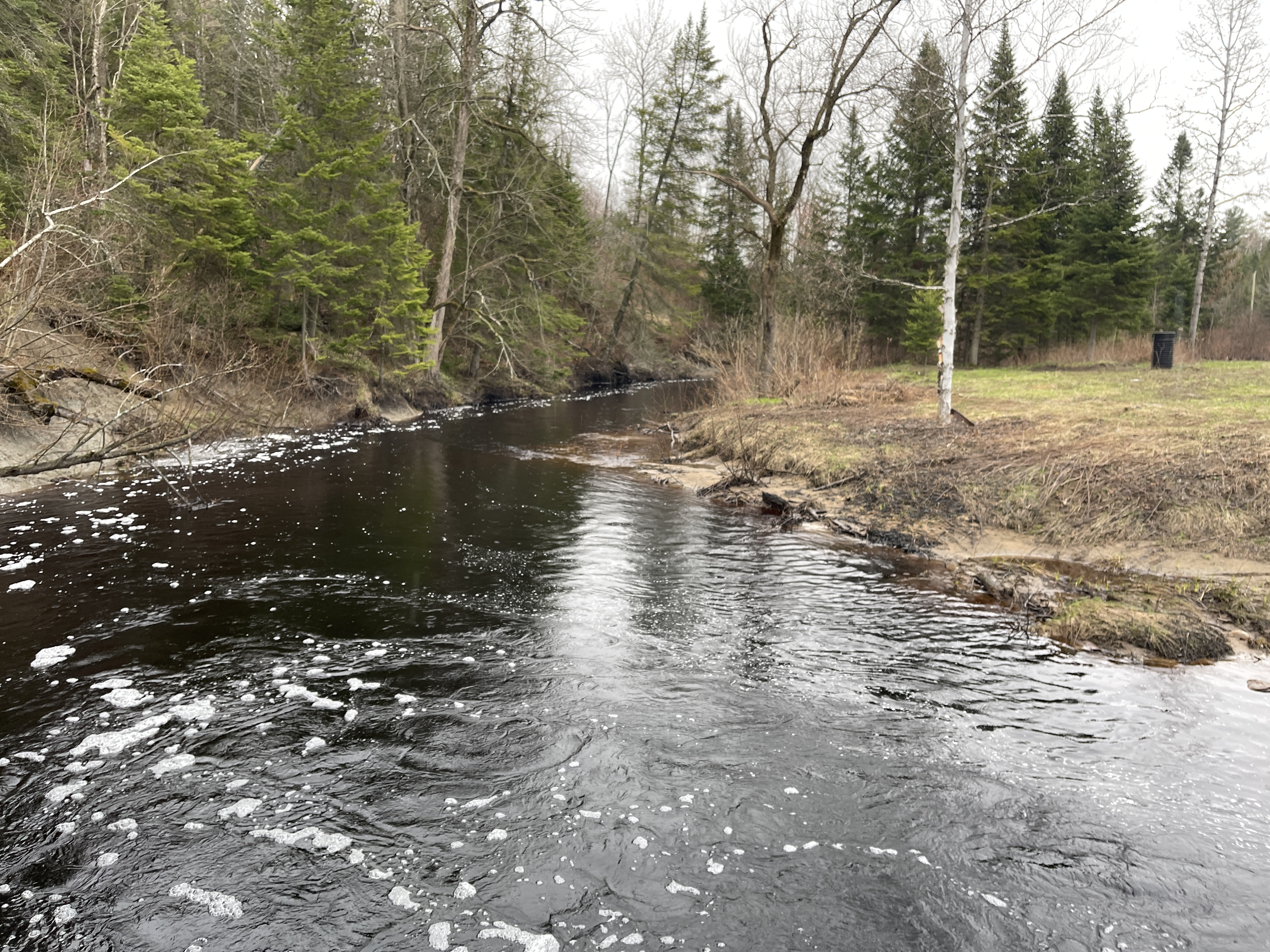
Private forest road

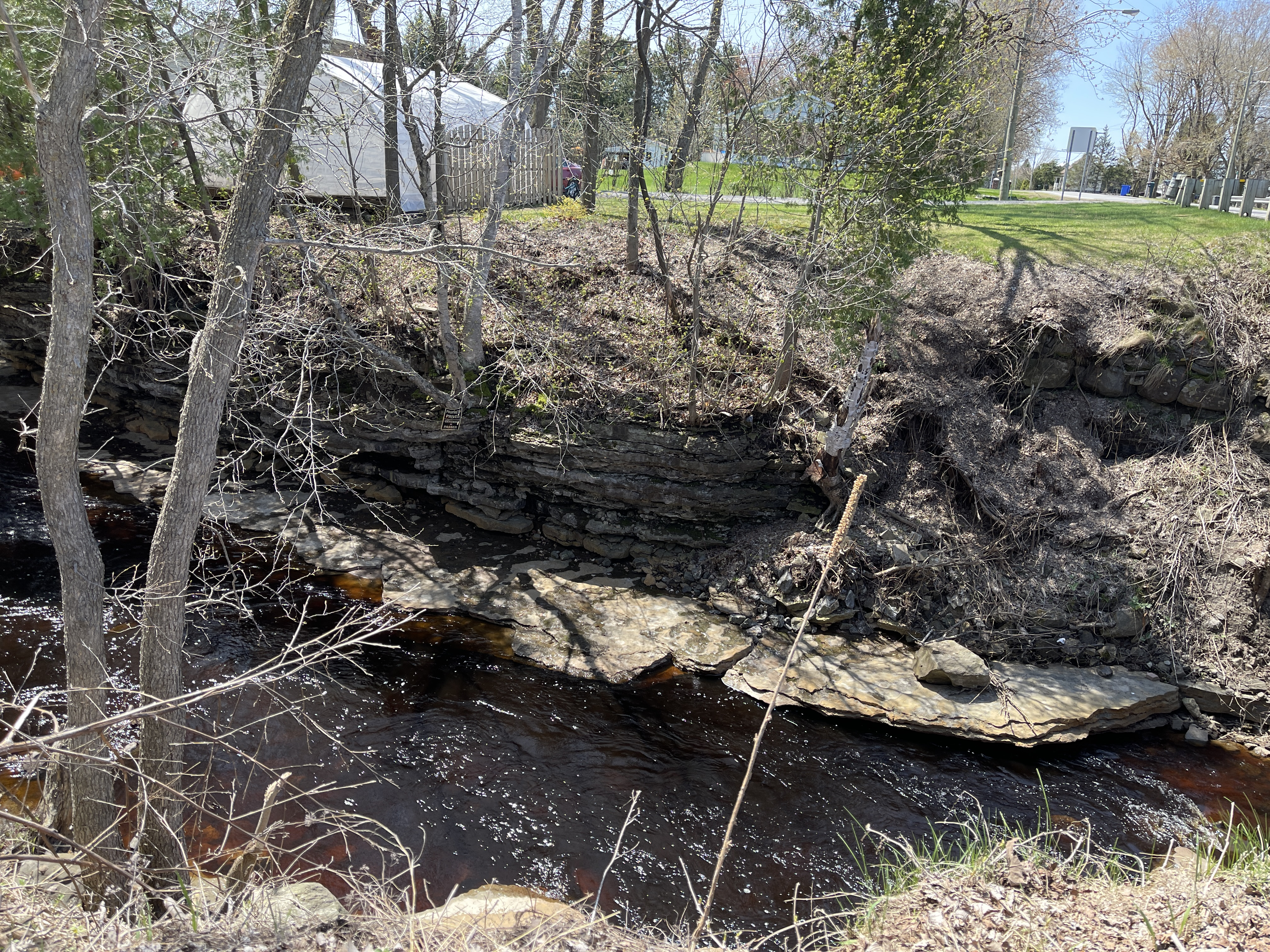
From bridge P-01574, rang Ste-Marguerite

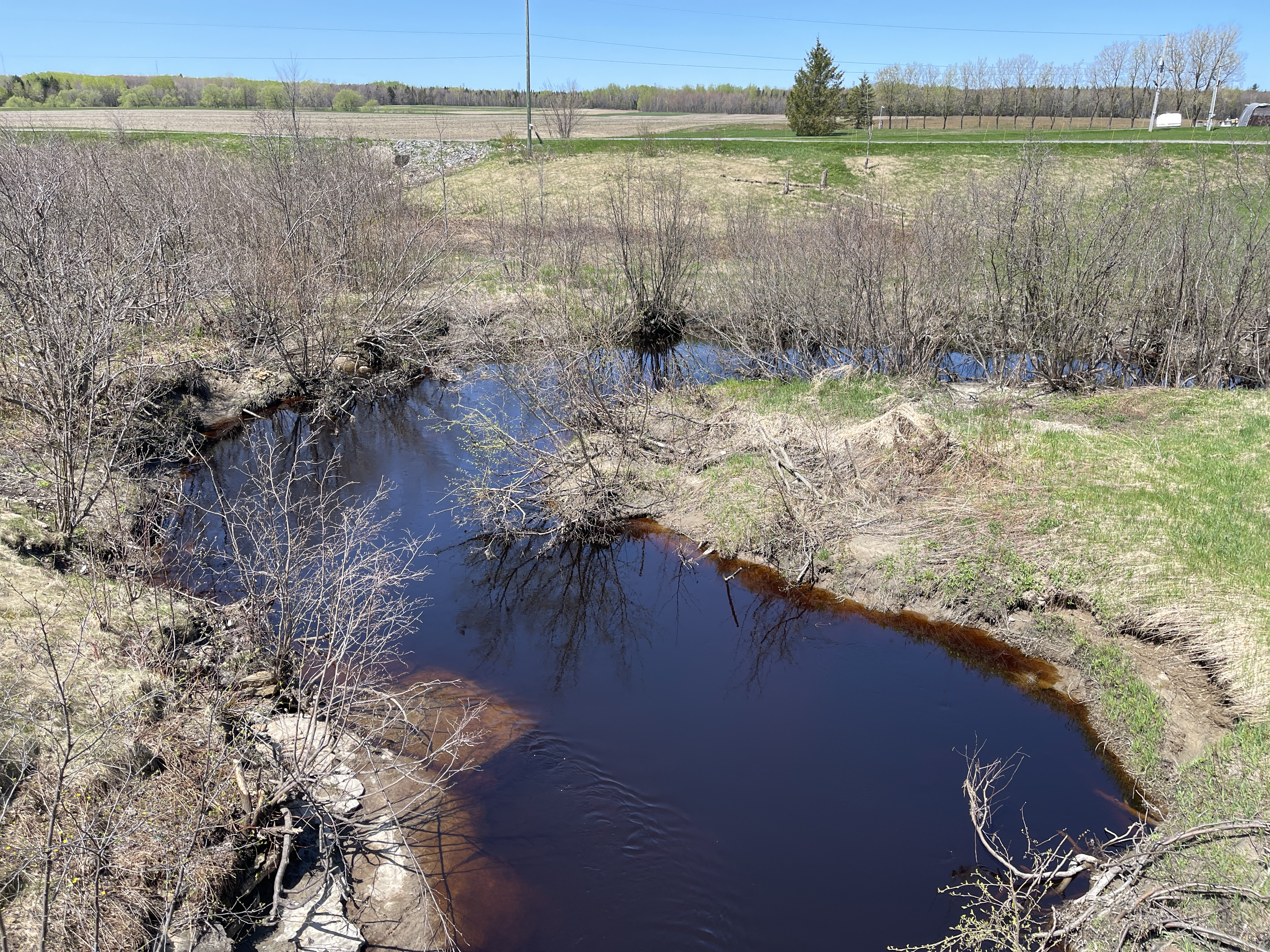
From bridge P-01574, rang Ste-Marguerite

== Toponymy ==
The toponym Rivière au Lard was formalized on December 5, 1968 at the Place Names Bank of the Commission de toponymie du Québec

== See also ==
- Champlain (municipality)
- Saint-Luc-de-Vincennes, municipality
- Saint-Maurice, municipality
- Saint-Narcisse, municipality
- Champlain River
- Lordship of Champlain
- List of rivers of Quebec
