= Brûlée River (Champlain River tributary) =

Brulée River
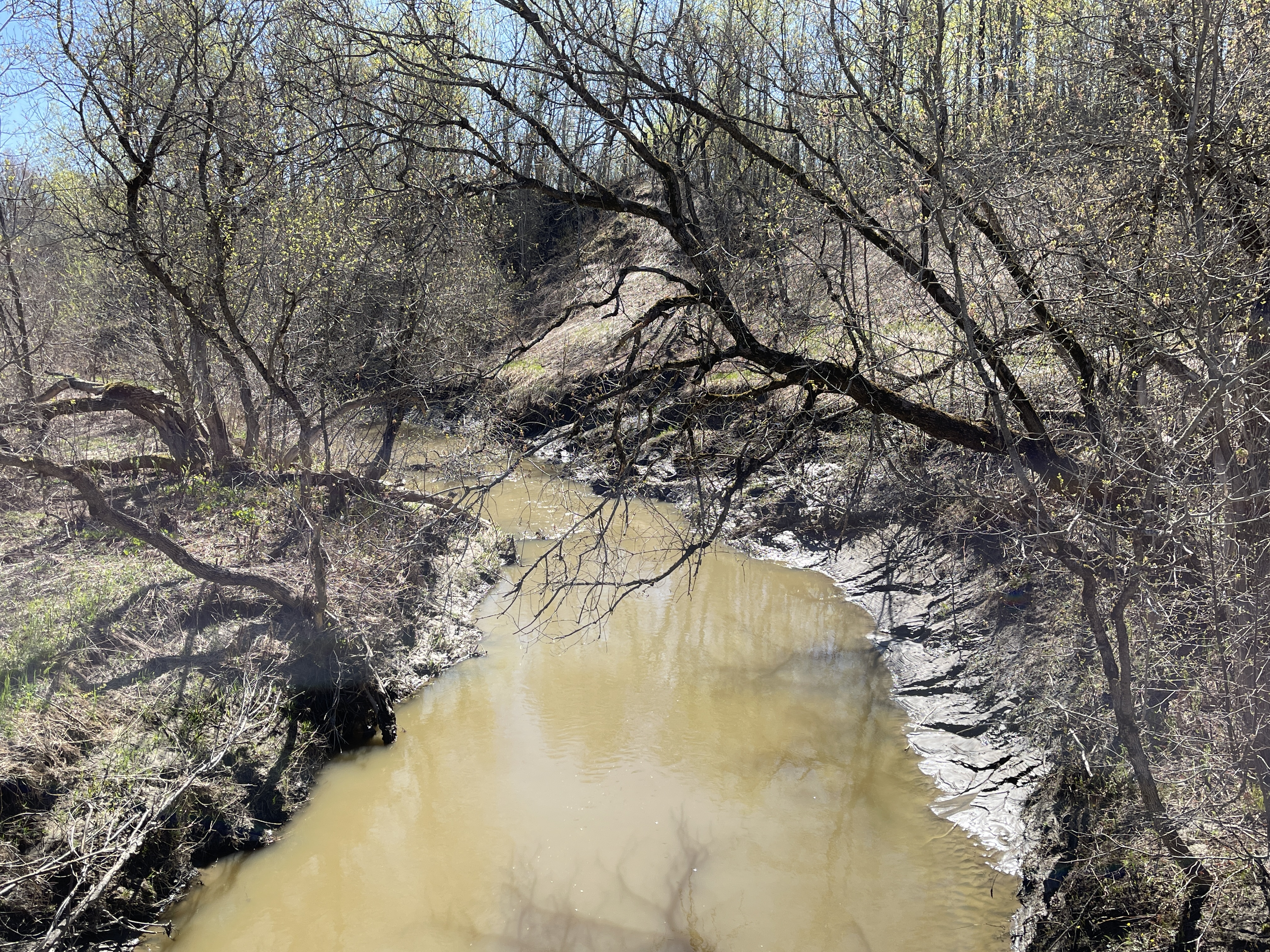
- Rang Saint-Alexis, Saint-Maurice

- Location within Quebec
- Native name: Rivière Brulée (French)

Location
- Country: Canada
- Province: Quebec
- Region: Mauricie

Physical characteristics
- Source: Massicotte Lake
  - location: Saint-Maurice, Les Chenaux Regional County Municipality, Mauricie administrative region, Quebec, Canada
  - coordinates: 46°30′01″N 72°35′30″W
  - elevation: 103 m (338 ft)
- Mouth: Champlain River
  - location: Saint-Maurice, Les Chenaux Regional County Municipality
  - coordinates: 46°26′51″N 72°30′02″W
  - elevation: 29 m (95 ft)
- Length: 14.1 km (8.8 mi)

Basin features
- Tributaries
  - left: Discharge of lac Lacommande.
  - right: Ruisseau Morin

The Brûlée River (Champlain River tributary) is flowing entirely in the municipality of Saint-Maurice, in the Les Chenaux Regional County Municipality, in the administrative region of Mauricie, in Quebec, Canada.

The course of the Brûlée river flows on the east side of the Saint-Maurice River and on the north side of the St. Lawrence River. This river is part of the hydrographic side of the Champlain River which generally winds north-east, then south-east, to the north shore of the St. Lawrence River.

With the exception of a short forest area at the start and end of its course, the Brûlée River descends mainly in agricultural areas.

== Toponymy ==
The term "burned" is used to identify a certain number of realities, often related to fire, to a fire started either by nature (lightning or other) or by the hand of man, consequence of an accident, negligence or a deliberate, voluntary act.

The flames ravaged, destroying trees sometimes for weeks, spreading to nearby forests. At the same time, the "burned" created a large tract of fertile land, at least during the first years of its exploitation.

Sources : Rivière Brûlée (Burnt River) origin and meaning (fr) - Rivière brûlée, Government of Canada, Geographical Name

== Geography ==
The Brûlée river rises at the mouth of Lac Massicotte (altitude: 102 metres (335 ft)). This small body of water is located south of Plé de Saint-Narcisse, on the north side of the hamlet Lac-Montreuil. The small lake is located 4.8 kilometres (3.0 mi) North-east of the center of the village of Notre-Dame-du-Mont-Carmel, 8.9 kilometres (5.5 mi) to the North -West of the confluence of the Brule river and 14.3 kilometres (8.9 mi) North-West of the North shore of the St. Lawrence River.

== Photos ==
Rivière Brûlée (Champlain River)
In Quebec, panel on bridges identifies watercourse, municipality, public road

Saint-Maurice (parish municipality)

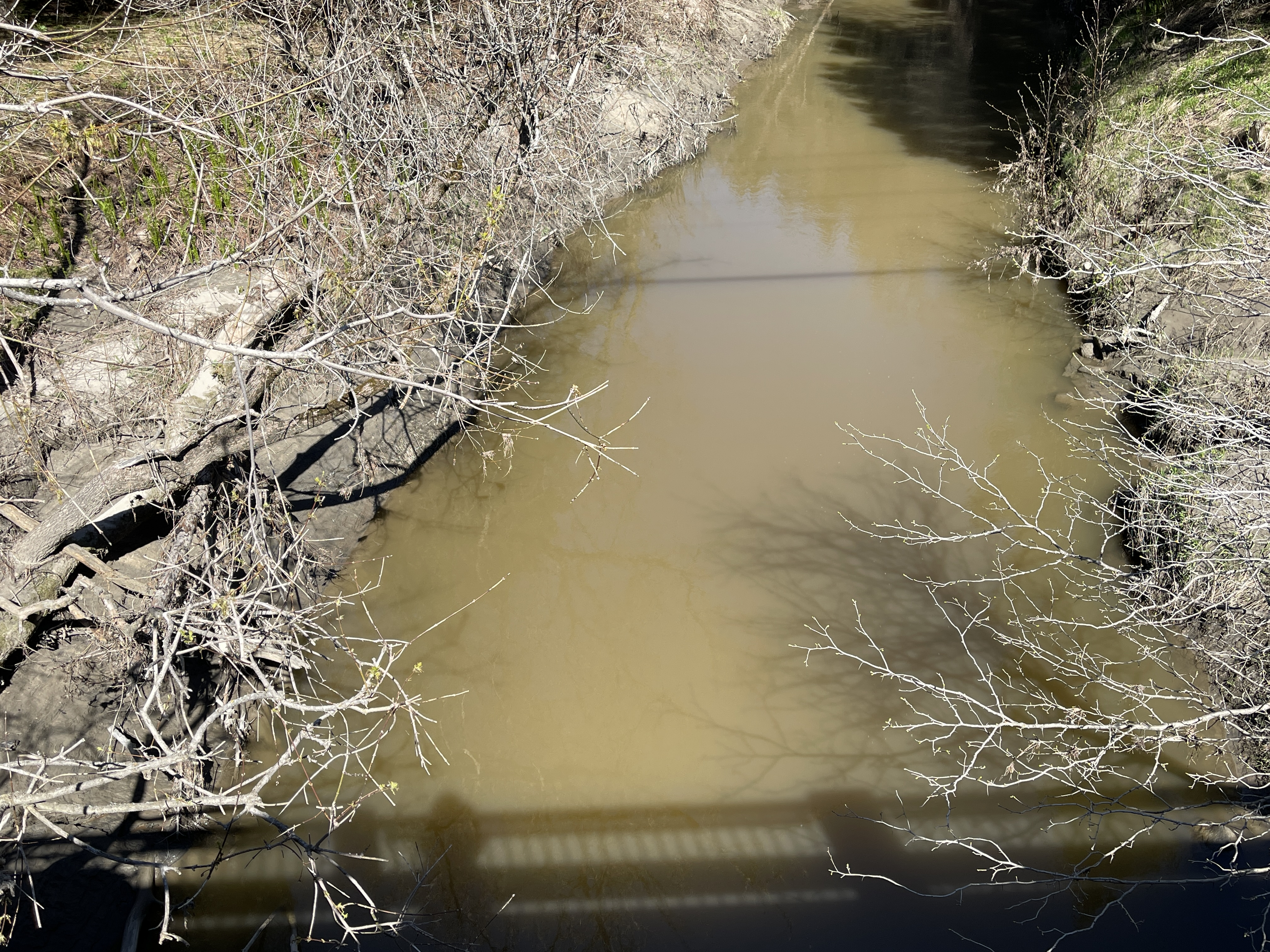
Rang Saint-Alexis, Bridge P-01571, rang Saint-Alexis

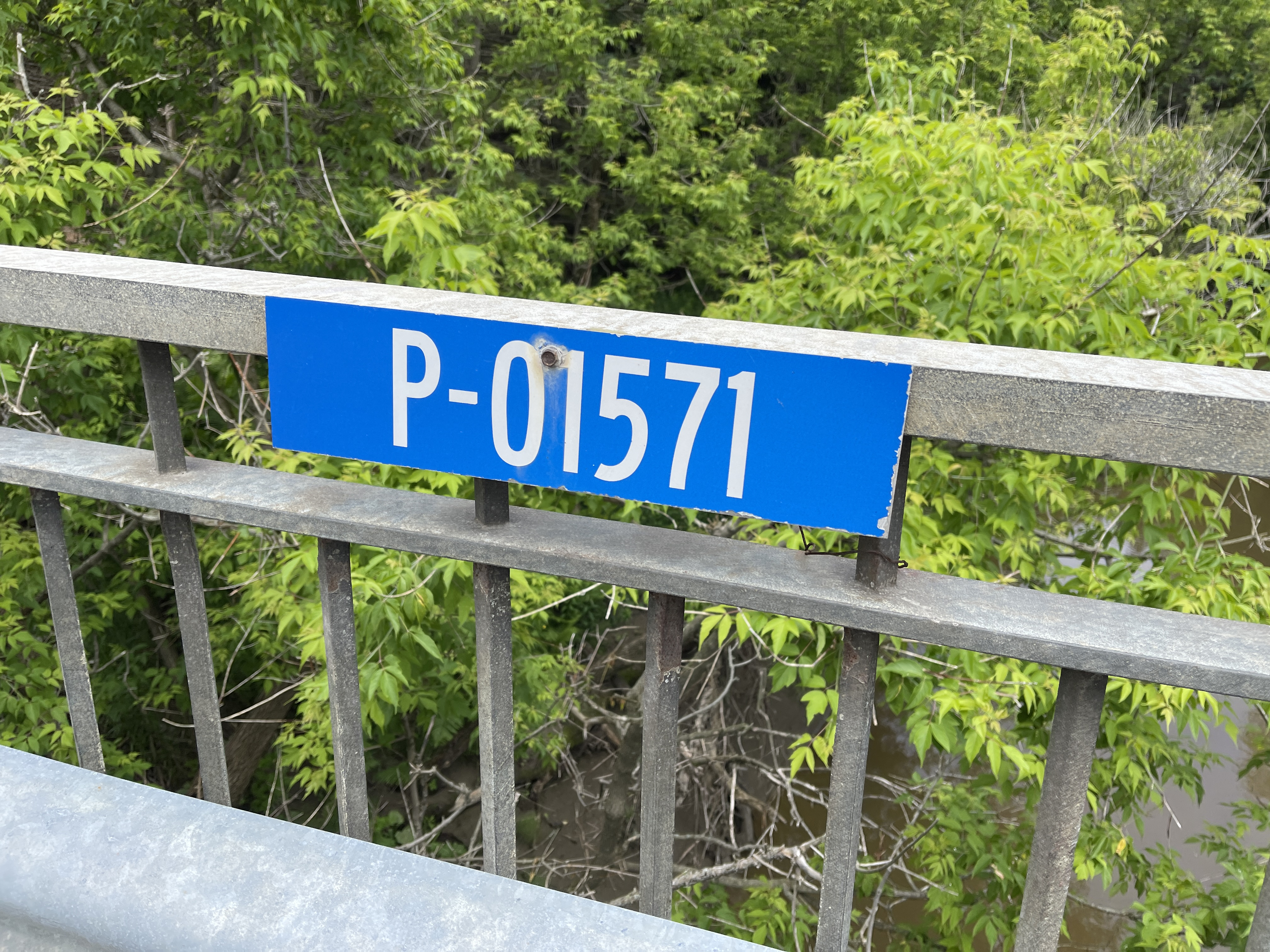
P-01571, bridge's number, Rang Saint-Alexis

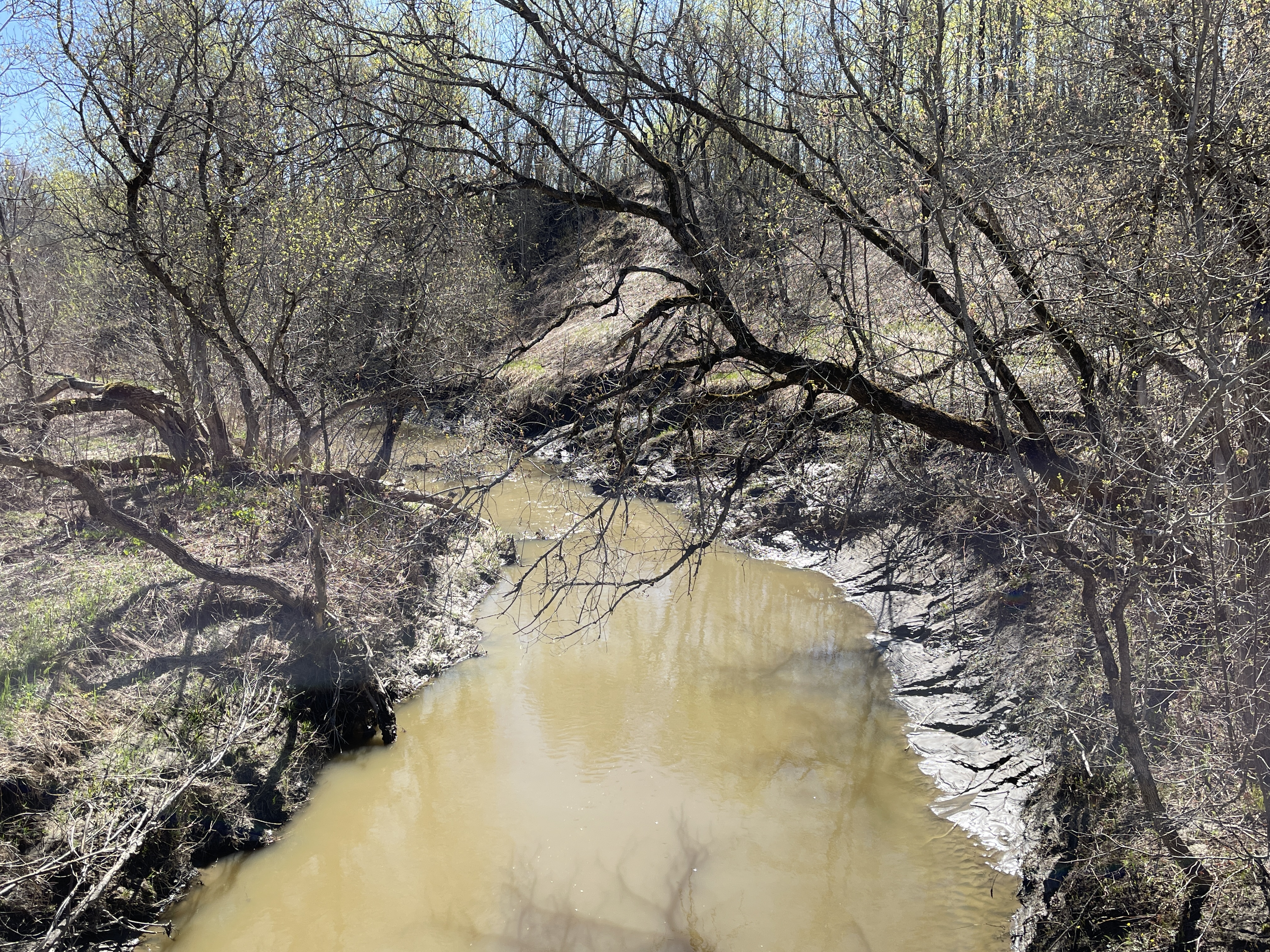
Rang Saint-Alexis

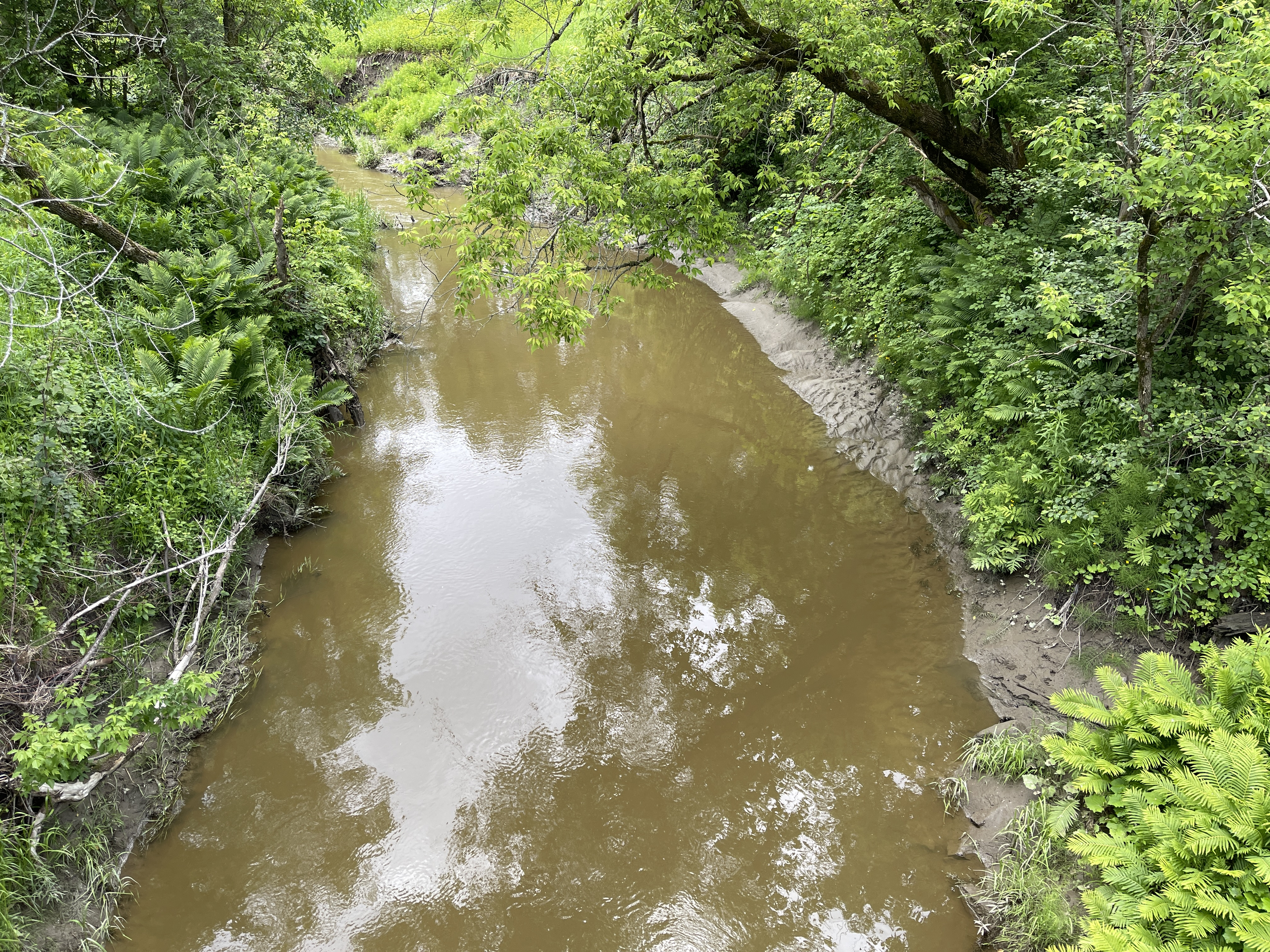
Rang Saint-Alexis

== See also ==
- Les Chenaux Regional County Municipality
- Saint-Maurice, a municipality
- Champlain River, a stream
- St. Lawrence River, one of the great river on Earth
- List of rivers of Quebec
