= Champlain River =

River in Canada

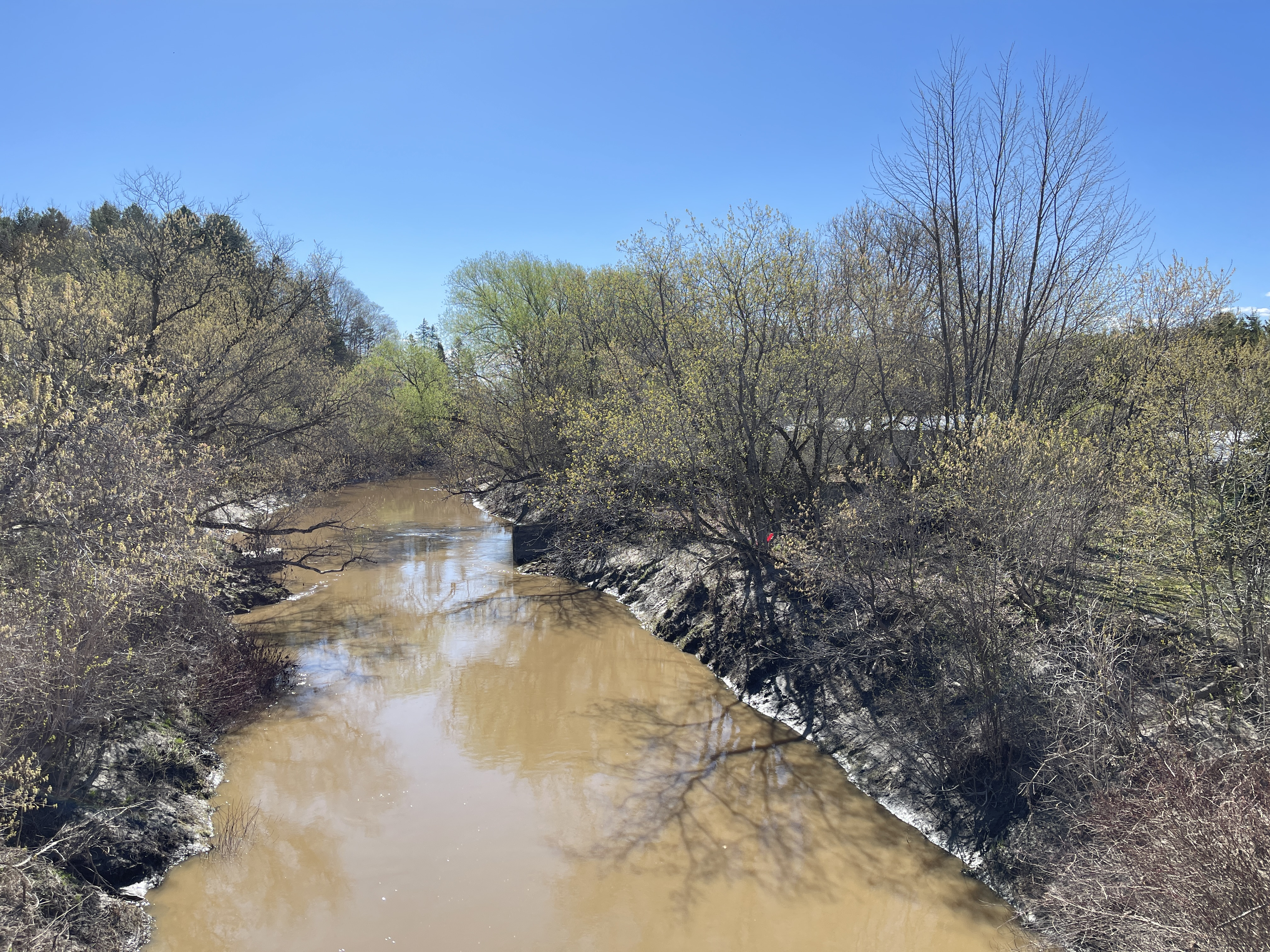
- Route St-Marie, Champlain

Location
- Country: Canada
- Province: Quebec
- Region: Mauricie

Physical characteristics
- Source: Brook
  - location: Saint-Maurice, Les Chenaux Regional County Municipality
  - coordinates: 46°26′49″N 72°16′52″W
  - elevation: 59 m (194 ft)
- Mouth: St Lawrence River
  - location: Champlain, Mauricie administrative region
  - coordinates: 46°26′49″N 72°16′55″W
  - elevation: 5 m (16 ft)
- Length: 68 km (42 mi)

Basin features
- Tributaries
  - left: Ruisseau Picardie ruisseau des Prairies; Noire River (Champlain River); Rivière au Lard; Rivière Brûlée ruisseau Barome, ruisseau Martin
  - right: Ruisseau des Plaines ruisseau de la Racine Salée, cours d'eau Laborde cours d'eau Clermont-Leblanc cours d'eau Grandmont-Pintal ruisseau de Rouille ruisseau Pronovost cours d'eau Normandin ruisseau Beaudoin

The Champlain River flow on the north shore of St. Lawrence River, between Saint-Maurice River and the Batiscan River watershed, in Les Chenaux Regional County Municipality, in Mauricie administrative region, in the province of Quebec, Canada.

== Hydrography ==
The Champlain River has its source in the western part of the basin, by the flow of water from the moraine that flows towards Lake Morin in Notre-Dame-du-Mont-Carmel. Its route totals 68 km and ends in the St. Lawrence River, 4.9 km east of Champlain municipality. The waters of the basin also have their sources from the Brulée River (Saint-Narcisse Moraine) and the Lac-à-la-Tortue bog via the Lard and Forks rivers.
Source: Champlain River Watershed Master Plan. p.54

SAMBBA, the Batiscan-Champlain watershed organization, received investments to carry out a project to restore the Ammocrypta pellucida – Sand stinger. – Eastern Sand Darter, Sand Darter, Northern Sand Darter, Sand Darter, in the Champlain River, as well as Percina copelandi.– Channel Darter. – Channel Darter, Copeland's Darter, habitat, two endangered fish species.
Source: Champlain River: habitat restoration for two fish species. Le Nouvelliste on February 7, 2022

Champlain River, at few meters of its mouth, in the St. Lawrence River, Champlain (Québec)

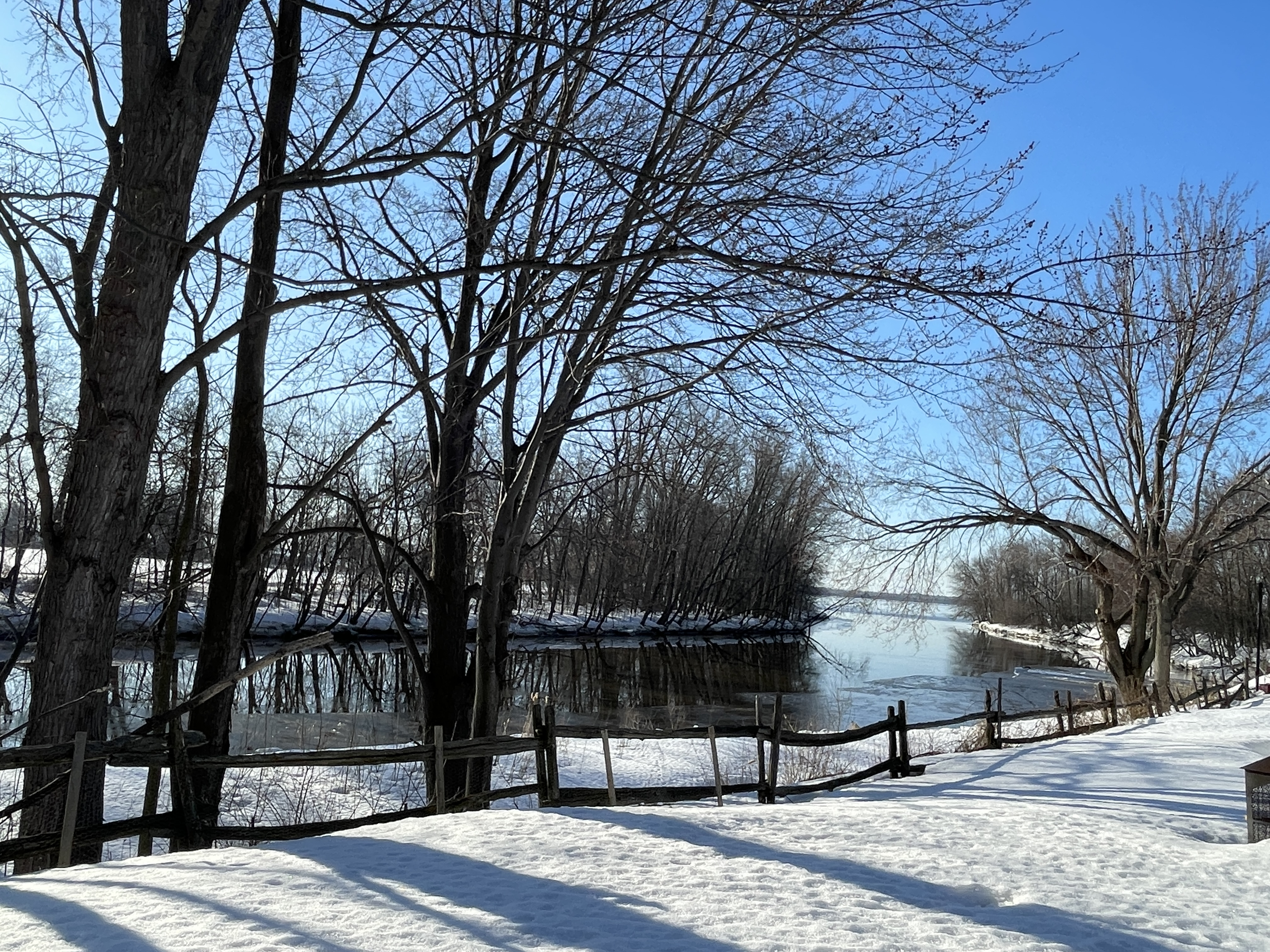
Chemin du Roy (route 138)

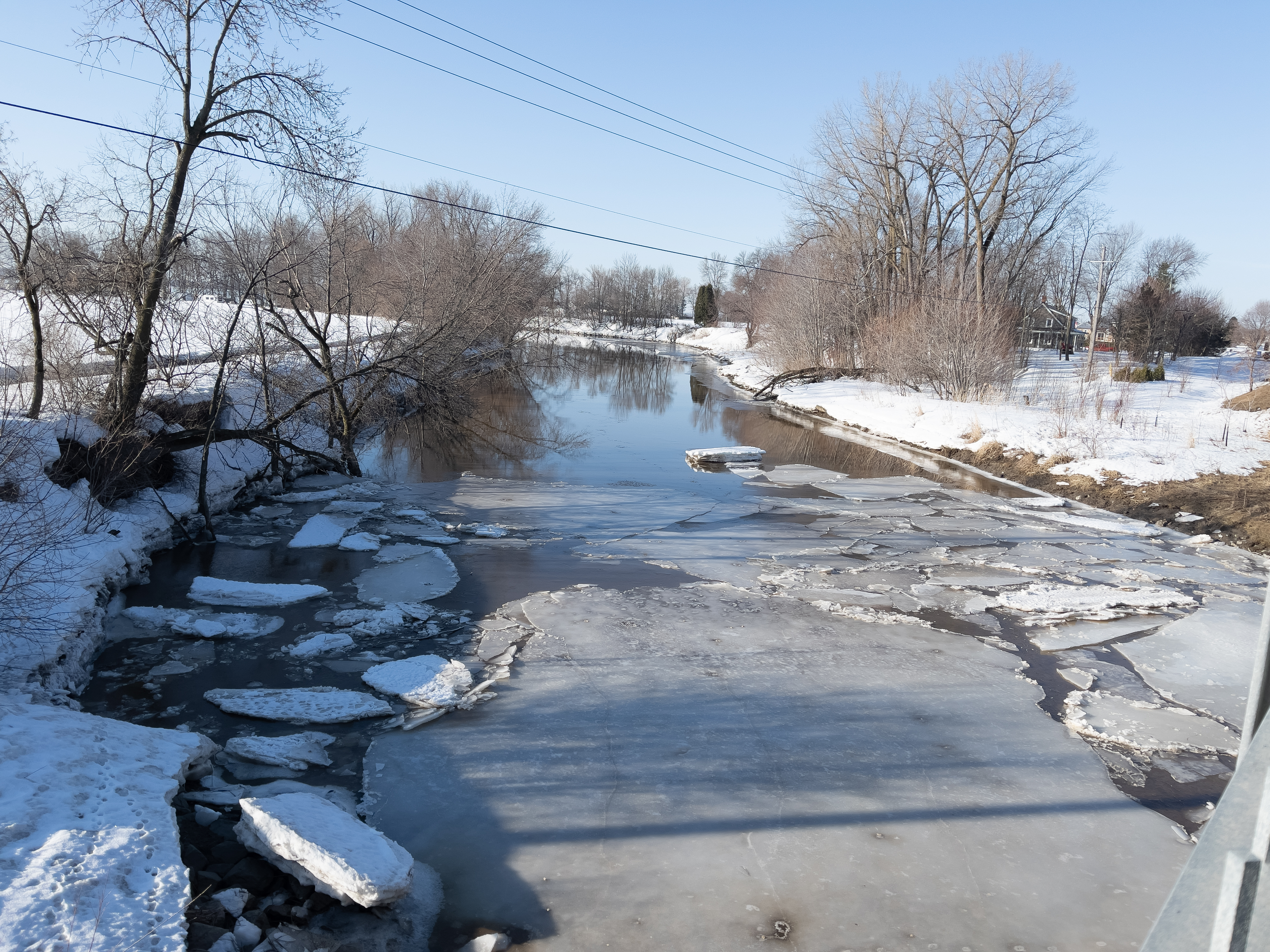
From bridge P-1476, Chemin du Roy (route 138)

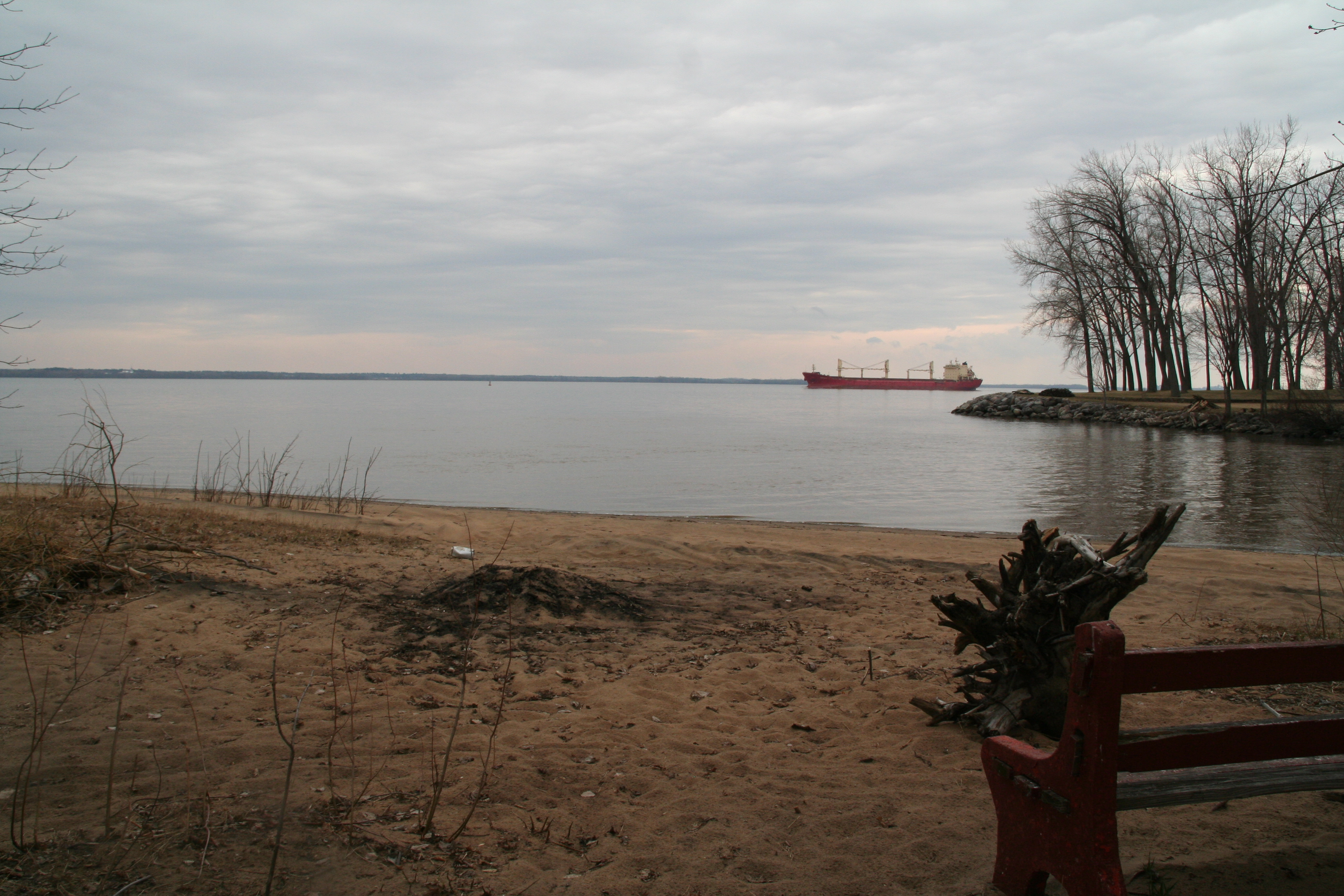
The river flows into the St. Lawrence River
Champlain River

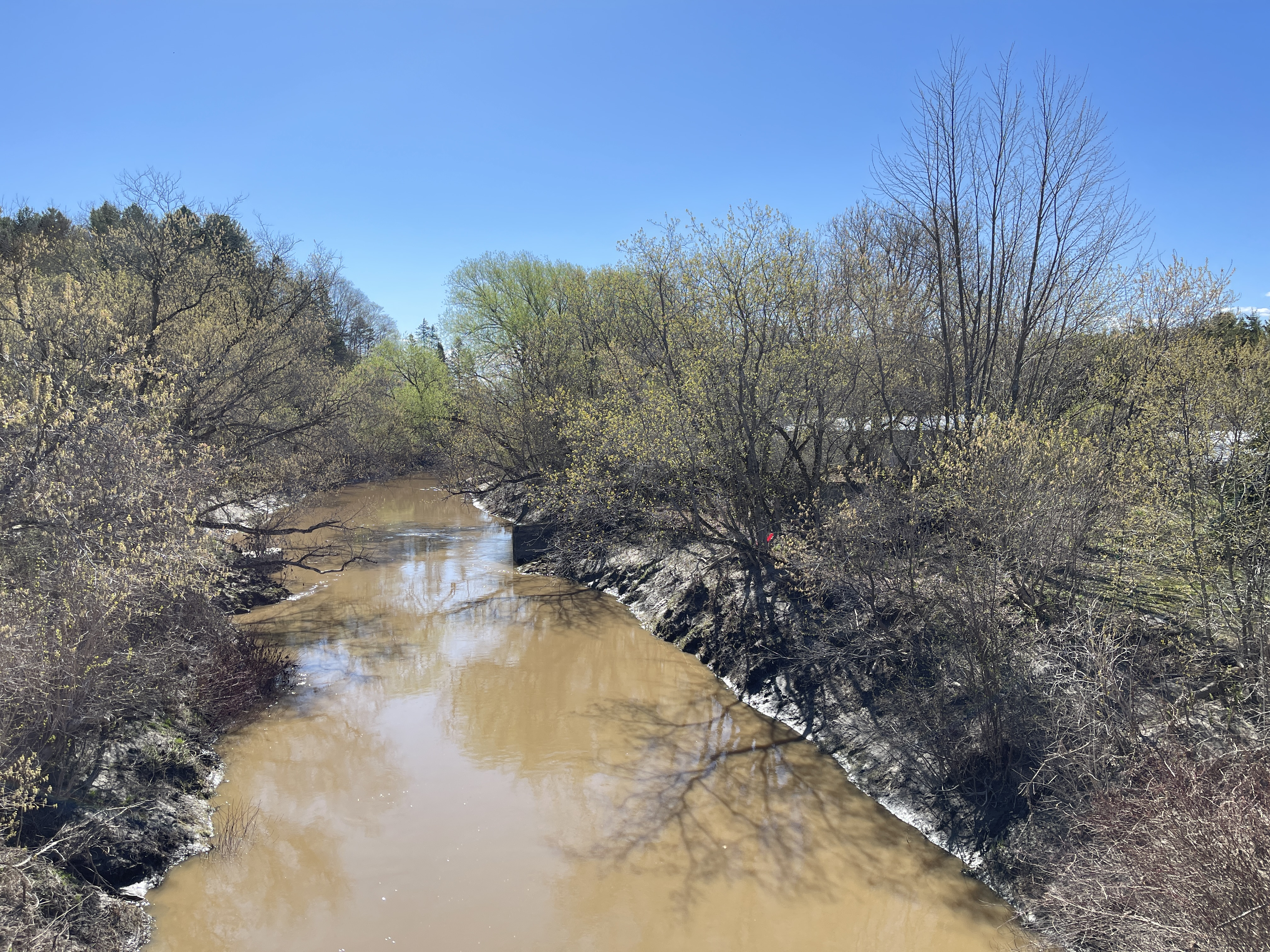
From bridge P-17667, route Ste-Marie, Champlain

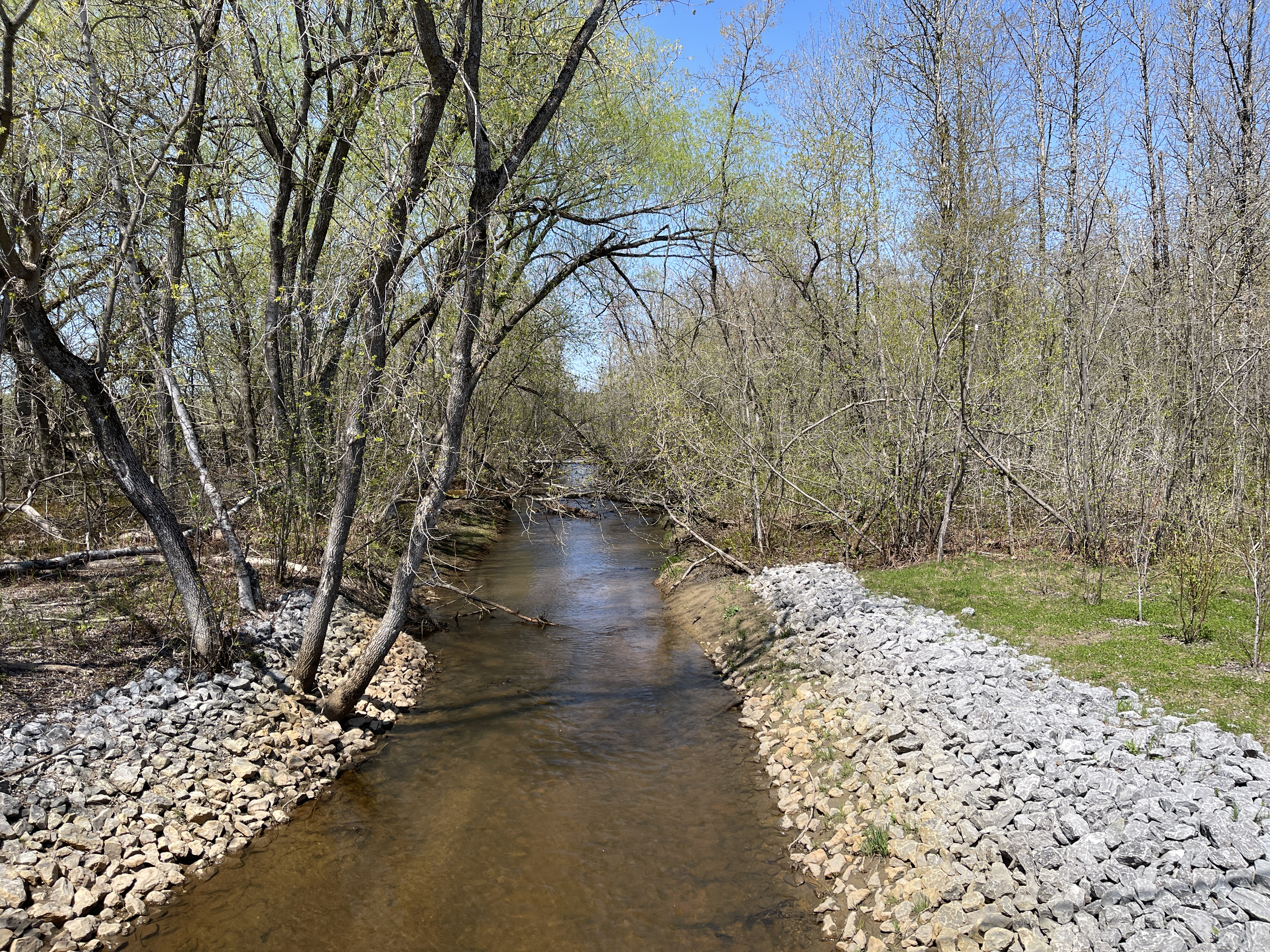
Rivière Champlain, from bridge P-18914, rue des Marguerites, Trois-Rivières

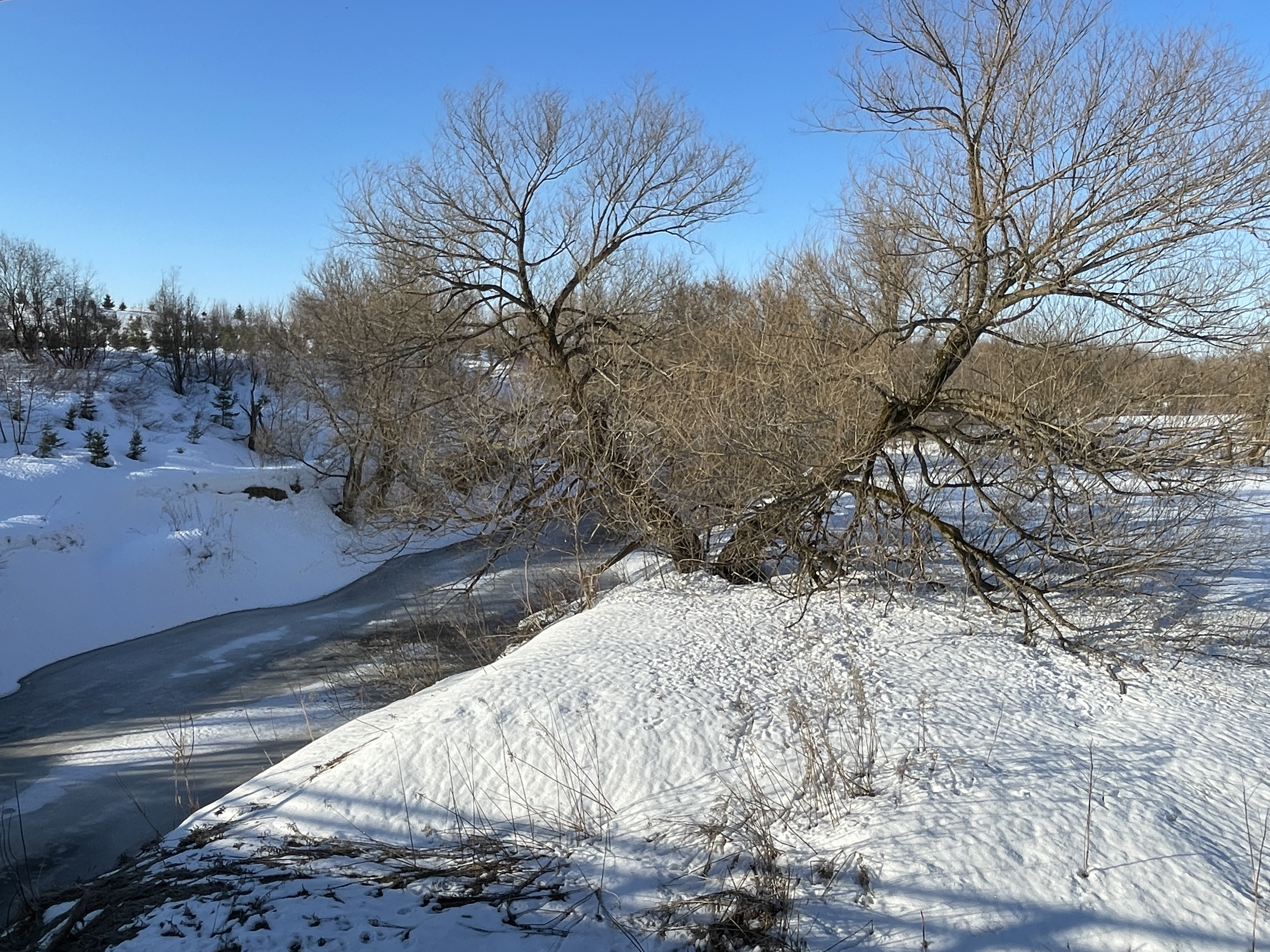
From bridge P-01570, route 359 Sud, St-Luc-de-Vincennes

== Geography ==
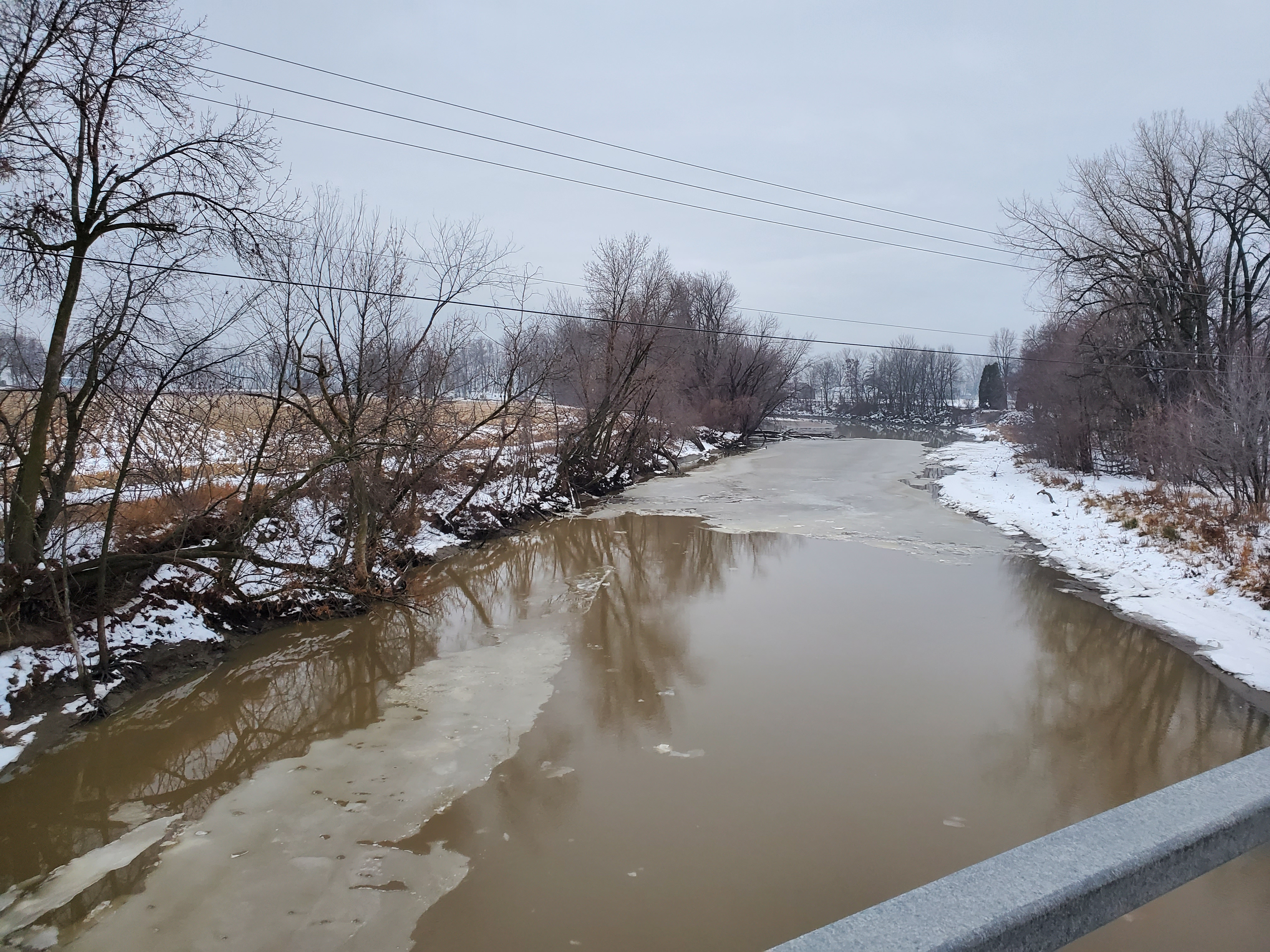
Champlain River in wintertime, from Route 138 bridge, Champlain

Champlain River is flowing almost at the boundary between the manors of Batiscan and Champlain. The Champlain River flows from north to south to empty into the St. Lawrence River at Champlain village. Champlain River rises at an altitude of about 130 meters in wetlands located at the foot of the moraine of Saint-Narcisse. Its watershed through the municipalities of Notre-Dame-du-Mont-Carmel, Trois-Rivières (Saint-Louis-de-France area), Saint-Maurice, Saint-Narcisse, Saint-Luc-de-Vincennes, Sainte-Geneviève-de-Batiscan, Batiscan and Champlain, all located, with the exception of Trois-Rivières, in the Les Chenaux Regional County Municipality.

Champlain River divides into four distinct branches that connect to the main branch. It is characterized by the presence of several meanders, a number of which are abandoned along the river near its mouth. The geographical coordinates of the mouth of the river are: -72.28194 West, 46.44695 North.

The watershed of the river Champlain is divided into five sub-basins, sub-basins upstream of the four branches of the main section, from west to east, the sub-basins of rivers Champlain (upstream) of burned with bacon and fork, and the sub-basin of the downstream portion of the Champlain River which flows in the four branches. The slope varies from 5.0 m/km in the sub-basin of the "rivière Brulée" (Burned River) to 0.7 m/km in the sub-basin of the river downstream of the Champlain portion.

== Landslides ==
The banks of the Champlain River are composed of marine clays, a variety that is very unstable compared to other types of clay, favoring landslides when water accumulates in the clay soil.

History of landslides in Saint-Luc-de-Vincennes:

- 1823 - Laying of clay in Leda.
- 1878 - Laying of clay in Leda.
- 1895 - Laying of clay at Leda; death toll of 5.
- 1981 - Casting of clay in Leda.
- 1986 (September) - Laying of clay in Leda, taking part of the road and vacant land.
- November 2016

A major landslide occurred on the night of November 9 to 10, 2016, on a lot of land belonging to Luc Normandin, in the Saint-Joseph-Ouest range, within the limits of Saint-Luc-de-Vincennes. The field started to move around 9.30 pm on November 9. The slip site is approximately one kilometer from the 1986 slip site, which was twice as large as the one in 2016.

The slip stopped at about ten meters from the house of Luc Normandin and its barn sheltering about sixty cattle. This natural disaster generated a large crater of the size of a baseball field, about 160 meters wide and a depth of between 2 and 10 meters, between farm buildings and the edge of the Champlain River.

Thousands of tons of clay and earth slipped into the river bed completely blocking the flow of water over several tens of meters. The water has risen to make its way again.

Two houses were evacuated and a 200-meter security perimeter was established around the crater.

== Toponymy ==
Samuel de Champlain gave its name to this river. It is reported for the first time on the map in 1613 by Samuel de Champlain, shifted back to his card in 1632. This name, Champlain, was then given to the lordship (1664), the catholic parish (1665), the provincial county (1829), the municipality (1845) and the Federal county (1867).

The toponym "Champlain River" was officialized in the registry of places name at the Commission de toponymie du Québec as of December 5, 1968.

== History ==
In 1863, Stanislas Drapeau Champlain wrote that "Champlain river has enough water power in order to activate flour mills and saws, and the large tannery of Mr. Richardson, living in Quebec".

About 1800, Mathew Bell built a mill having 32 saws. Burned in 1850, it was replaced by a saw mill counting 20 saws and a tannery belonging to L. Osborne Richardson. The tannery was moved to the Eastern Townships in 1875.

== See also ==
- Champlain (disambiguation)
- Government of Trois-Rivières
- Champlain, a municipality
- Saint-Luc-de-Vincennes, a municipality
- Saint-Narcisse, Quebec, a municipality
- Saint-Maurice, Quebec, a municipality
- Champlain Fort
- Champlain (federal electoral district) at Federal level
- Champlain (provincial electoral district)
- St. Lawrence River
- Rivière au Lard
- Brûlée River (Champlain River)
- Noire River (Champlain River)
- Lordship of Champlain
- List of rivers of Quebec

== Notes and references ==
Media related to Category: Champlain River at Wikimedia Commons

== Bibliography ==
- René Beaudoin, «Les moulins à scie et la tannerie de la rivière Champlain» (The saw mills and tanneries of Champlain river), Le Postillon de Champlain (The Postilion of Champlain), Champlain, Champlain Historical Society, vol. 27, No. 2, April 2007, p. 21. (in French)
- René Beaudoin, «375e anniversaire du nom de Champlain» (375th anniversary of Champlain's name), Le Postillon de Champlain (The Postilion of Champlain), Champlain, Champlain Historical Society, vol. 27, No. 3, September 2007, pages 13–16. (in French)
- Jean-Pierre Chartier, «Les caprices d'une rivière» (The vagaries of a river), Le Postillon de Champlain (The Postilion of Champlain), Champlain, Champlain Historical Society, vol. 25, No. 2, March 2005, pp. 10–18 (first part), vol. 26, No. 1, December 2005, pp. 4–11 (second part); flight. 26, No. 2, April 2006, pp. 3–7 (third party); flight. 27, No. 1, December 2006, pp. 14–19 (Part Four) flight. 29, No. 2, April 2009, pp. 8–12 (fifth and last part). (in French)
- Guillaume Tellier, Mylène Vallée, Isabelle Lavoie et Stéphane Campeau, Portrait du bassin versant de la rivière Champlain, Rapport déposé au Comité ZIP les Deux-Rives (Portrait of Champlain Watershed River, report tabled by ZIP Deux-Rives Committee). Trois-Rivières, Section of geography, University of Québec at Trois-Rivières, 73 pages. Available online, click here (in French)
