= Quebec Route 359 =

Highway in Quebec, Canada

Route 359

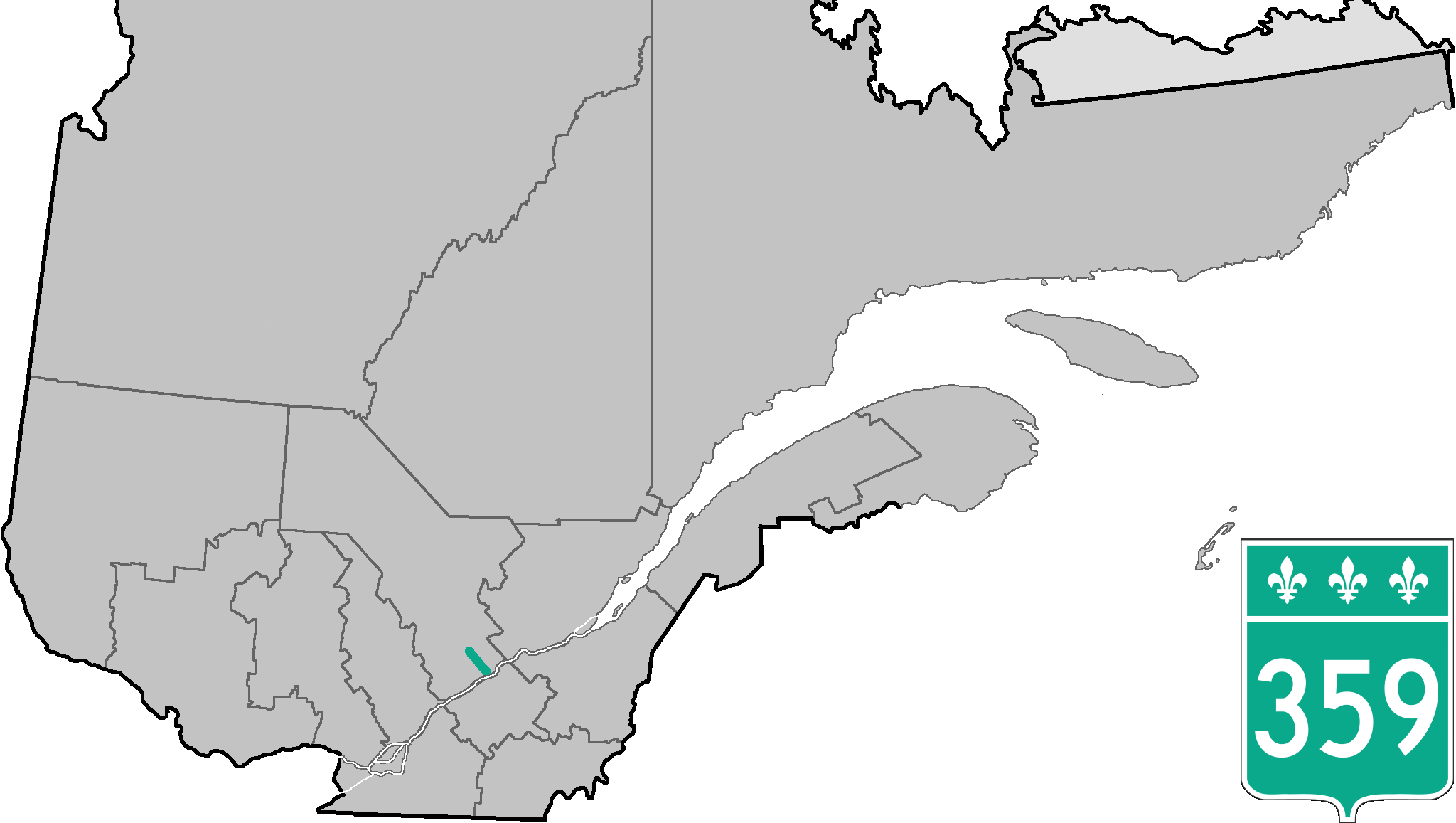

Route information
- Maintained by Ministère des transports du Québec
- Length: 31.7 km (19.7 mi)

Major junctions
- South end: R-138 in Champlain
- A-40 near Champlain
- North end: R-153 in Shawinigan

Location
- Country: Canada
- Province: Quebec
- Major cities: Shawinigan

Highway system
- Quebec provincial highways; Autoroutes; List; Former
← R-358	→ R-360

Route 359 is a 32 km north–south regional road in Quebec, Canada, going from Champlain to Grand-Mère. It is one of the direct roads linking Autoroute 40 (exit 220) to the Shawinigan-Grand-Mère area.

It goes through the villages of Saint-Luc-de-Vincennes and Lac-à-la-Tortue.

== Municipalities along Route 359 ==
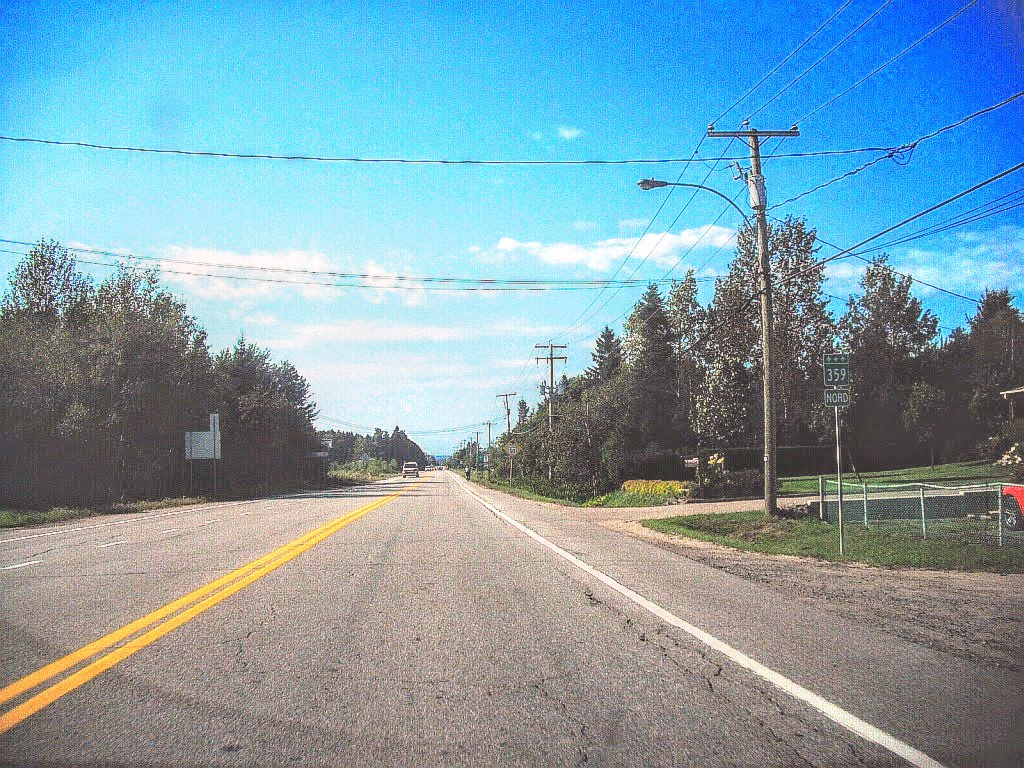
Quebec Route 359 in Shawinigan

- Champlain
- Saint-Luc-de-Vincennes
- Saint-Narcisse
- Shawinigan

== Major intersections ==
RCM or ET	Municipality	Km	Road	Notes
Les Chenaux	Champlain	0.0	R-138	
Les Chenaux	Champlain	3.7	A-40	Exit 220 (A-40)
Les Chenaux	Saint-Luc-de-Vincennes	12.5	R-352	Southern terminus of Route 352 / Route 359 overlap
Les Chenaux	Saint-Narcisse	16.6	R-352	Northern terminus of Route 352 / Route 359 overlap
Shawinigan	Shawinigan	28.4	53e Avenue	To Shawinigan-Sud
Shawinigan	Shawinigan	31.7	R-153	

== See also ==
- List of Quebec provincial highways
