= Champlain, Quebec =

Champlain
- Municipality
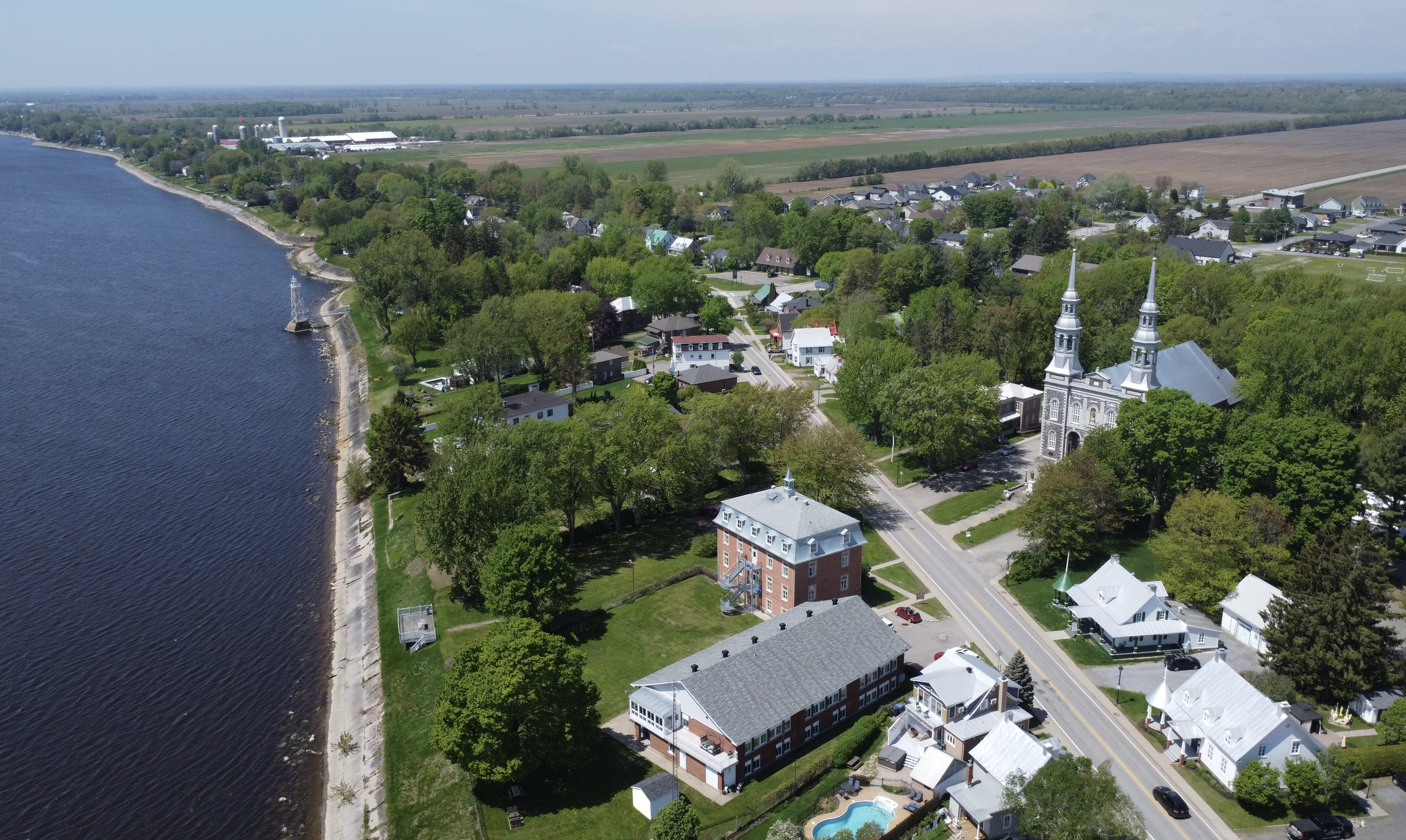
- Motto: Fidèle, Tenace et Fier ("Faithful, Tough and Proud")
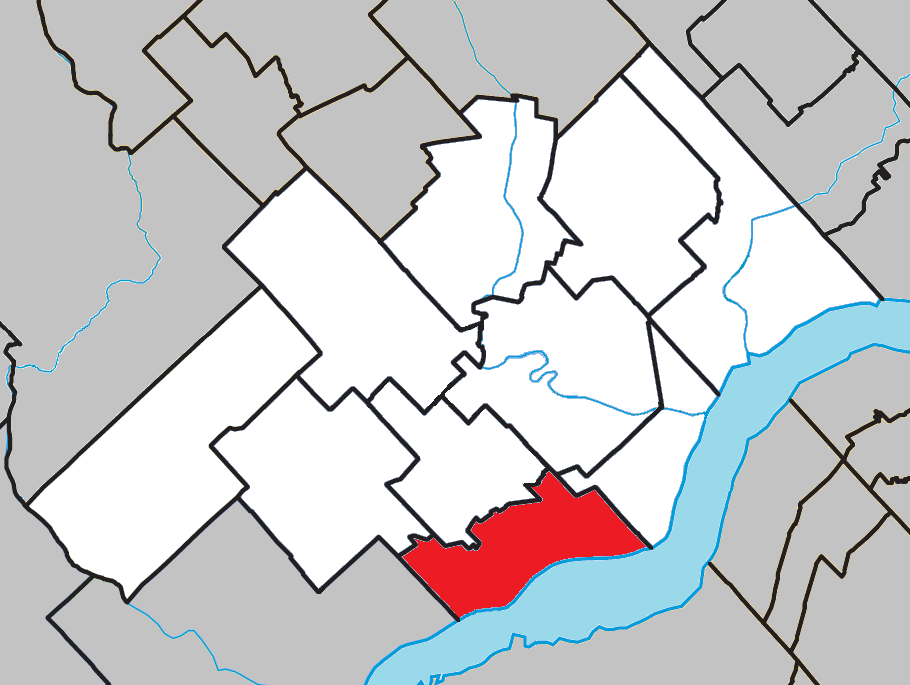
- Location within Les Chenaux RCM

- Location in central Quebec
- Coordinates: 46°27′N 72°21′W
- Country: Canada
- Province: Quebec
- Region: Mauricie
- RCM: Les Chenaux
- Settled: ca. 1664
- Constituted: December 11, 1982

Government
  - Mayor: Guy Simon
  - Fed. riding: Saint-Maurice—Champlain
  - Prov. riding: Champlain

Area
  - Total: 78.8 km^{2} (30.4 sq mi)
  - Land: 58.17 km^{2} (22.46 sq mi)

Population (2021)
  - Total: 1,807
  - Density: 31.1/km^{2} (81/sq mi)
  - Pop (2016-21): ▲4.1%
  - Dwellings: 957
- Time zone: UTC−5 (EST)
  - Summer (DST): UTC−4 (EDT)
- Postal code(s): G0X 1C0
- Area code: 819
- Highways A-40: R-138 R-359
- Website: www.municipalite.champlain.qc.ca

Champlain (French pronunciation: [ʃɑ̃plɛ̃]) is a municipality in the province of Quebec, Canada. It is located in Les Chenaux Regional County Municipality and the administrative region the Mauricie, on the north shore of St. Lawrence River. Champlain is also part of the metropolitan area of Trois-Rivières.

Champlain is a member of the Association of the Most Beautiful Villages of Quebec.

== Etymology ==
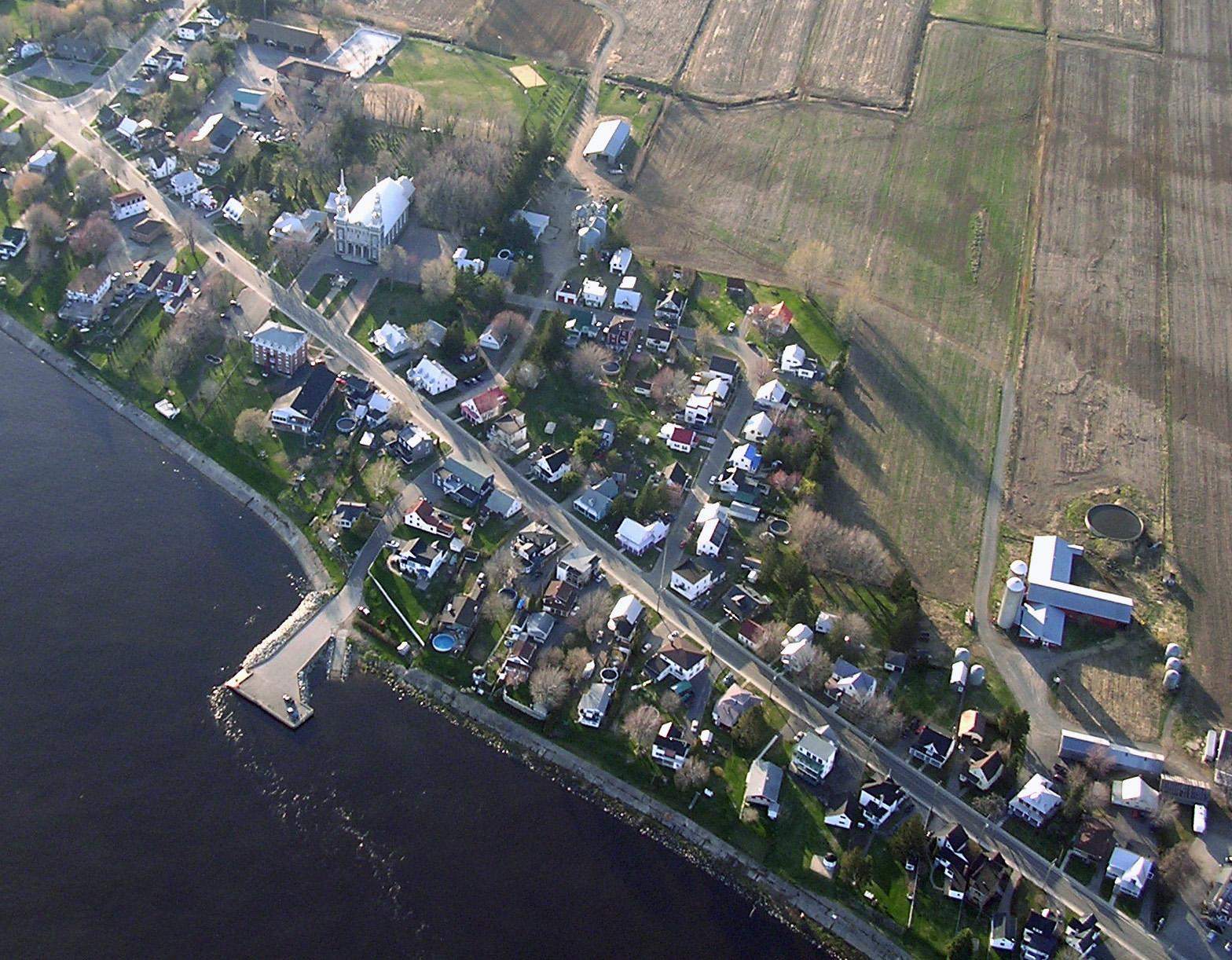
Aerial view

In 1632, Samuel de Champlain, founder of New France, gave his name to the Champlain River. The Commission de toponymie du Québec has noted a "popular version" of the origin of the name, which suggests that Champlain gave the area its name because, "amazed by the beauty of the place, [he] exclaimed to himself, 'What a beautiful flat plain', from the Latin campus planus, 'flat field'." However, the Commission concludes that it is certain that Champlain named the area after himself, as his contemporary record indicates that he named the river the "Rivière de Champlain".

The deed of the seigniory of Champlain, dated April 8, 1664, does not name the seigniory. The deed only mentions that the granted land extended "from the Champlain River following the said river [Saint Lawrence] to the said Trois-Rivières". It appears that it was the first seigneur, Étienne Pézard de la Touche, who gave the name of "Champlain" to the seigniory, then to the parish.

By 1668, the documents relating to the residents of Champlain mention they live in "La Touche-Champlain", or simply "Champlain" from 1669 onwards. In 1684, the area was already well known as Champlain, demonstrated when Bishop Laval, finally giving the official titles of the parish twenty years after its foundation, referred to: "the place commonly called Champlain".

As for the family name of the seigneurs, by 1680 the first seigneur referred to himself as La Touche-Champlain, and Pézard Champlain by 1693. His successor referred to himself as Pézard Latouche-Champlain by 1702.

In 1829 the name was used for the electoral district for the area in the Legislative Assembly of Lower Canada, and in 1841, the electoral district for the Legislative Assembly of the Province of Canada. The name was given to the municipality in 1845, and then to the federal and provincial electoral districts in 1867.

== History ==
=== Beginnings of French settlement ===
The Champlain municipality lies on the territory of the former seigniories of Marsolet and l'Arbre-à-la-Croix, both granted on April 5, 1644, and the seigniory of Champlain, granted on August 8, 1664.

The first French occupants of Champlain settled in 1664 or 1665. There had been a first attempt to settle on land granted August 16, 1643, but the distance from other settlements and the Iroquois threat discouraged settlement. In 1664 or 1665, the first settlers established settlements in the land of the seigniory of Champlain. The following year, in 1666, concessions were granted in the seigniory of Hertel, and in 1667 in the seigniory of Marsolet. Some of the first families came from Trois-Rivières, such as the families of Antoine Desrosiers, François Chorel and Pierre Dandonneau.

=== Chronology ===
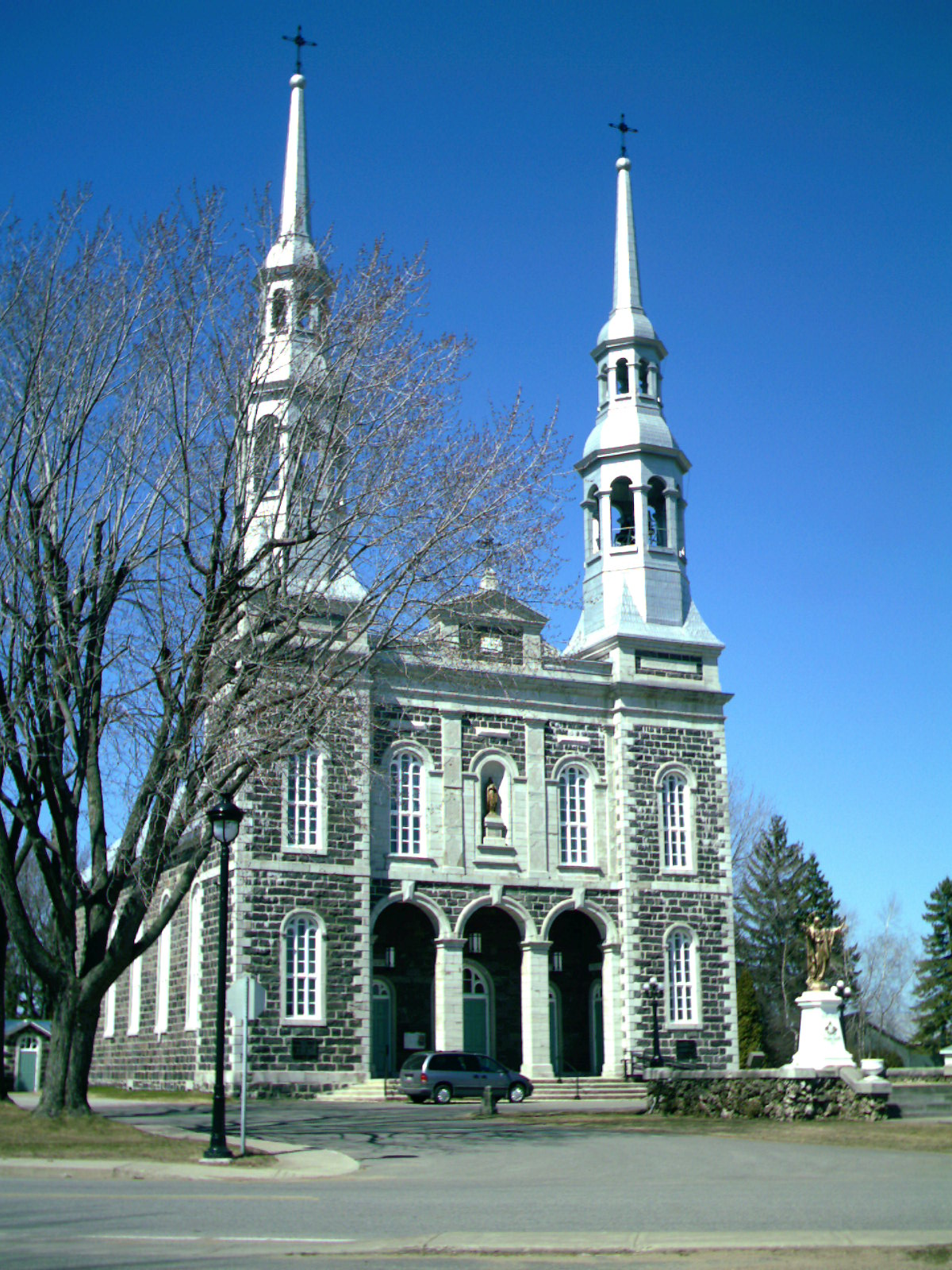
Notre-Dame-de-la-Visitation Church

- April 5, 1644: Grants of the Marsolet and Arbre-à-la-Croix seigniories.
- August 8, 1664: Grant of the seigniory of Champlain. This date is considered the founding of the town of Champlain, the eighth oldest town of New France.
- 1664: Construction of Fort Champlain.
- 1830-1850: Emergence of the present village in the centre of the area.
- 1845: Creation of the parish municipality of Champlain effective July 1, pursuant to a new provincial statute, the first formal municipal government for the area.
- 1847: Parish municipality of Champlain is merged with other local municipalities to form the County of Champlain, effective September 1, pursuant to a provincial statute re-organising municipal government.
- 1855: Parish municipality of La Visitation-de-Champlain re-created from the County of Champlain, effective July 1, pursuant to a provincial statute re-organising municipal government.
- 1860: Twenty buildings in the village.
- 1879: Construction of the present church
- 1882: Construction of the present monastery
- 1886: The streets Sainte-Anne and Saint-Joseph are authenticated by the municipal council.
- 1917: The village municipality of Champlain is created by a division of the parish municipality of La Visitation-de-Champlain.
- 1933: 150 buildings in the village.
- 1979 : Celebration of the tricentennial of Champlain. The 300th anniversary was based on an erroneous understanding of the date of the foundation of the village, assumed from the oldest surviving parish records of baptisms, marriages and burials. It was not known that the parish registers from 1665 to 1679 had been lost.
- 1982: Champlain municipalities are included in the Francheville Regional County Municipality.
- 1982: The parish municipality of La Visitation-de-Champlain and the village municipality of Champlain are merged to create the municipality of Champlain.
- 1984: 10: Pope John Paul II passes through Champlain on September 10, travelling by train from Quebec City to Trois-Rivières.
- 1986: On April 7, the municipal council passes a resolution formalizing the term "Champlainois-Champlainoise" to designate inhabitants of Champlain.
- 2002: The regional county municipality of Francheville is dissolved, and the municipality of Champlain is included in the new regional county municipality, Les Chenaux Regional County Municipality.
- 2004: On October 13, the Astronomical Observatory of Champlain discovers an asteroid from the Astronomical Observatory Champlain. It is given the number 157329 and is provisionally named 2004 TM16.
- 2006: On November 24, the Astronomical Observatory discovers a second asteroid, given the number 161815 and the temporary name of 2006 WK30.
- 2014: Celebration of the 350th anniversary of Champlain. This time, the celebration is based on the grant of the seigniory of Champlain in 1664.

== Demographics ==
In the 2021 Census of Population conducted by Statistics Canada, Champlain had a population of 1,807 living in 862 of its 957 total private dwellings, an increase of 4.1% from its 2016 population of 1,735. With a land area of 58.17 km^{2} (22.46 sq mi), it had a population density of 31.1/km^{2} (80.5/sq mi) in 2021.

Historical census populations – Champlain, Quebec

Year	Pop.	±%
1986	1,527	—
1991	1,610	+5.4%
1996	1,608	−0.1%
2001	1,623	+0.9%

Year	Pop.	±%
2006	1,566	−3.5%
2011	1,664	+6.3%
2016	1,735	+4.3%
2021	1,807	+4.1%

Source: Statistics Canada

Private dwellings occupied by usual residents (2021): 862 (total dwellings: 957)

Mother tongue (2021):

- English as first language: 0.8%
- French as first language: 96.7%
- English and French as first languages: 0.8%
- Other as first language: 1.4%
