= Saint-Luc-de-Vincennes =

- Municipality
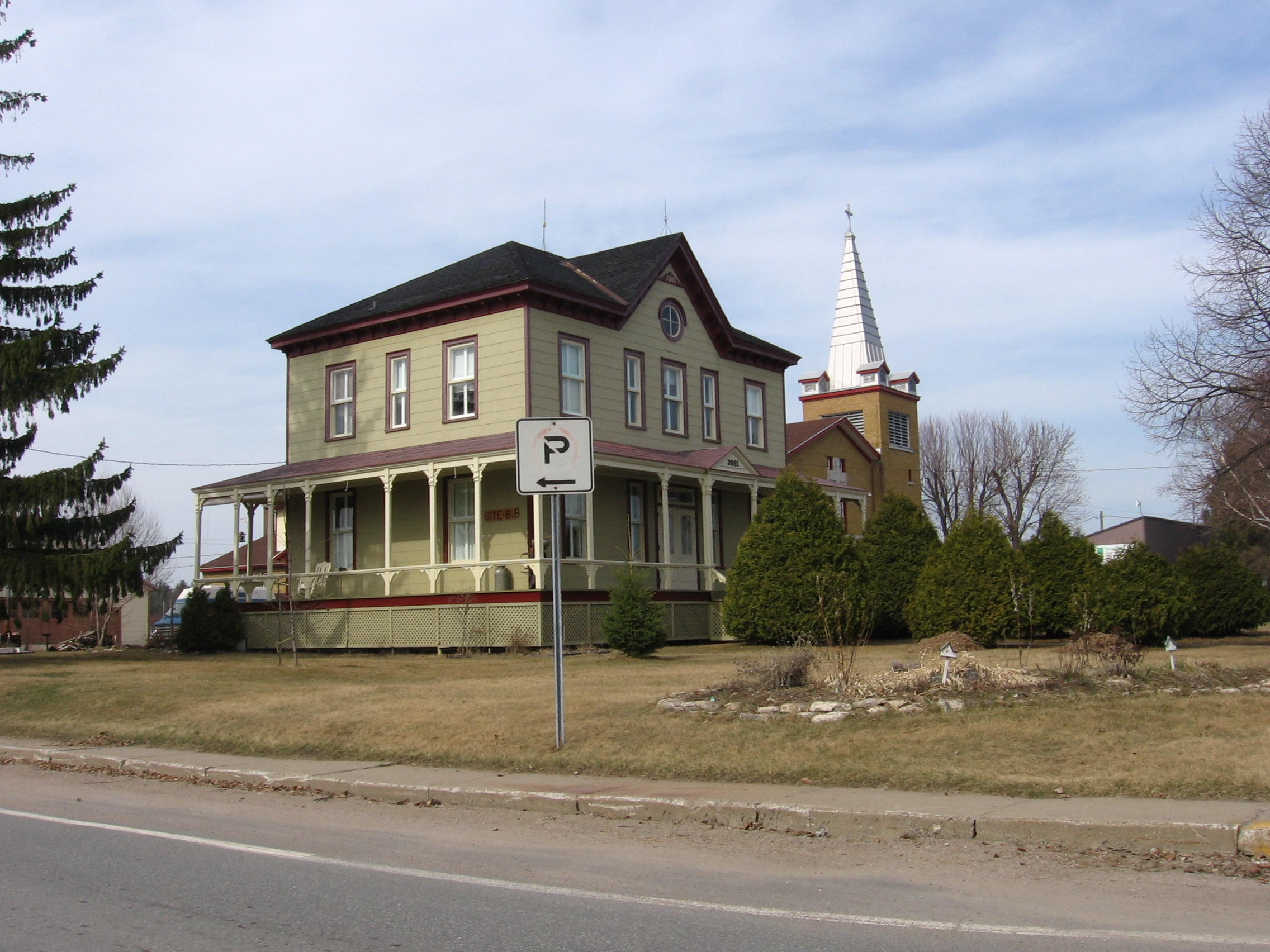
- Presbytery St-Laurent-de-la-Moraine Parish, rue de l'Église

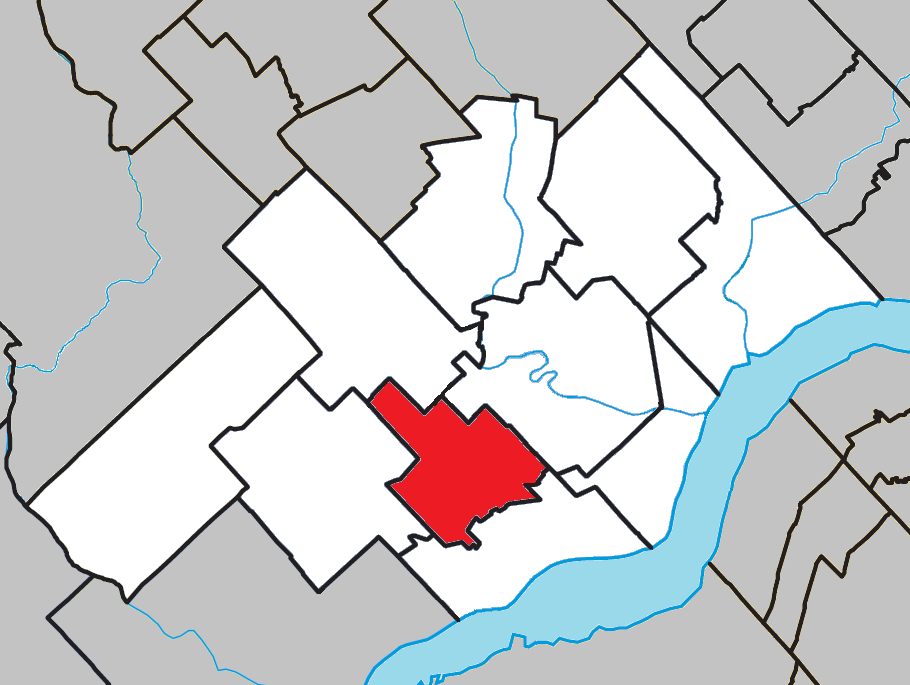
- Location within Les Chenaux RCM

- Location in central Quebec
- Coordinates: 46°30′N 72°25′W
- Country: Canada
- Province: Quebec
- Region: Mauricie
- RCM: Les Chenaux
- Constituted: January 19, 1865

Government
  - Mayor: Daniel Houle
  - Fed. riding: Saint-Maurice—Champlain
  - Prov. riding: Champlain

Area
  - Total: 54.31 km^{2} (20.97 sq mi)
  - Land: 53.78 km^{2} (20.76 sq mi)

Population (2021)
  - Total: 519
  - Density: 9.6/km^{2} (25/sq mi)
  - Pop (2016-21): ▼4.8%
  - Dwellings: 263
- Time zone: UTC−5 (EST)
  - Summer (DST): UTC−4 (EDT)
- Postal code(s): G0X 3K0
- Area code: 819
- Highways A-40: R-352 R-359
- Website: stlucdevincennes.com

Saint-Luc-de-Vincennes (French pronunciation: [sɛ̃ lyk də vɛ̃sɛn]) is a municipality in the Mauricie region of the province of Quebec in Canada. It is the seat of Les Chenaux Regional County Municipality.

== History ==
Detached from Saint-Narcisse and Champlain in 1865, the Parish Municipality of Saint-Luc changed its name and status to that of Municipality of Saint-Luc-de-Vincennes in 1991.

During the COVID-19 pandemic (2020–2023), the community of Saint-Luc-de-Vincennes was active around several spontaneous projects: the construction of a bread oven, the inoculation of mushrooms on logs, the planting of fruit shrubs, the cultivation of a community garden, the installation of beehives.

== Geography ==
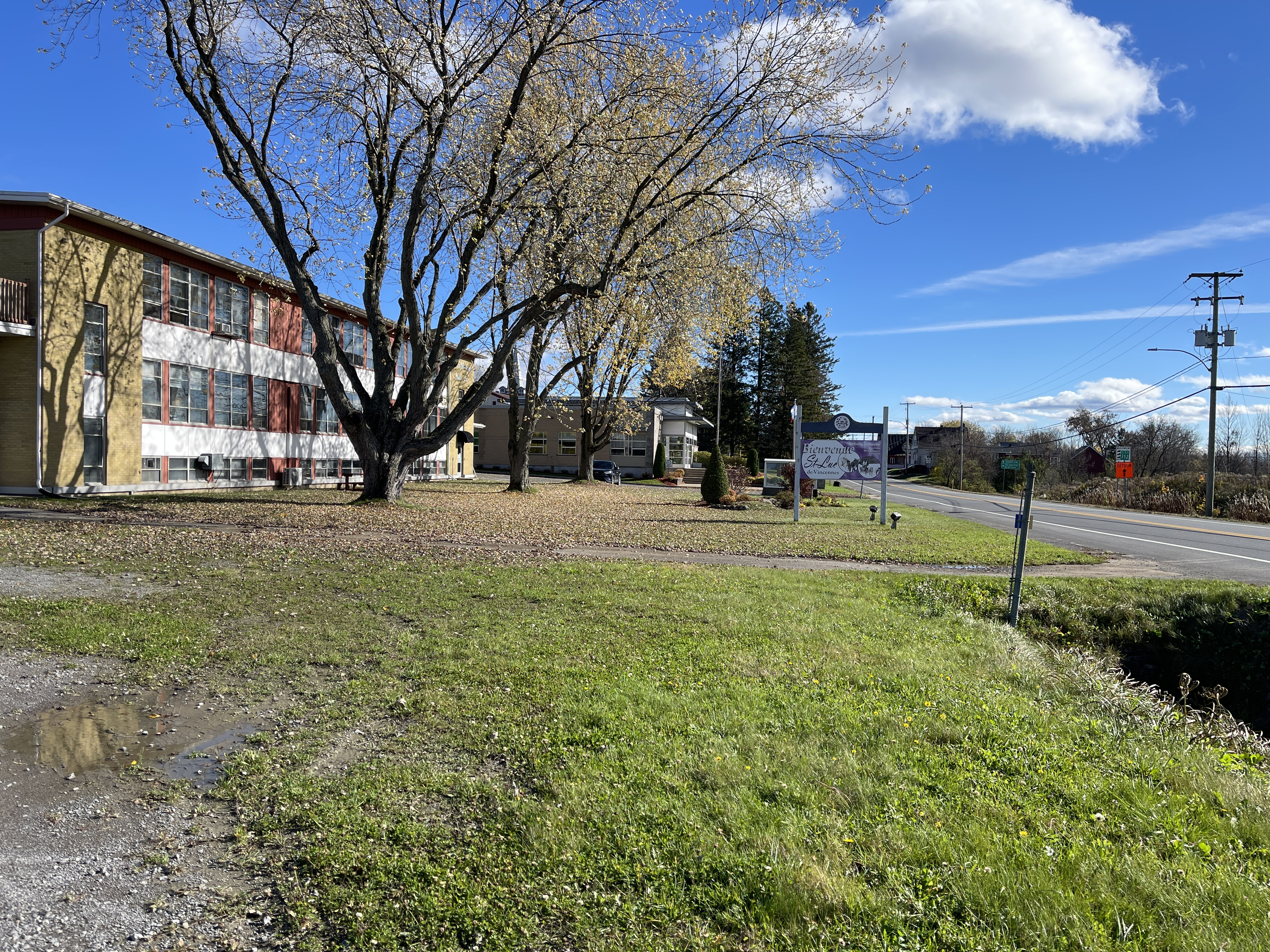
Administration Buildings, Main Street (Route 359)

The composition of the soil of Saint-Luc-de-Vincennes includes clay at depth, it favours landslides: those of 1823, 1878, 1895, 1981 and 1986 2016 are among the most remarkable.

On 9 November 2016, a landslide in sensitive glaciomarine sediments occurred on a terrace of the Champlain River near the municipality of Saint-Luc-de-Vincennes, Quebec. The particularity of this event is that there are evidences that the movement started as a flowslide and then finished as a spread. The landslide morphology comprises horsts and grabens typical of spreads and also a large quantity of remolded material that flowed out of a pear-shaped crater with a narrow bottleneck, typical of flowslides. The geotechnical investigation of this landslide was performed by the Ministère des Transports du Québec (MTQ) in collaboration with Université Laval, and consisted of light detection and ranging (LiDAR) surveys, drone photography, several boreholes, piezocone tests with pore pressure measurements (CPTUs), field vane tests, and piezometric monitoring.

== Demographics ==
Historical census populations – Saint-Luc-de-Vincennes

Year	Pop.	±%
1871	734	—
1881	818	+11.4%
1891	795	−2.8%
1901	660	−17.0%
1911	718	+8.8%
1921	749	+4.3%
1931	747	−0.3%
1941	825	+10.4%

Year	Pop.	±%
1951	817	−1.0%
1956	846	+3.5%
1961	745	−11.9%
1966	713	−4.3%
1971	646	−9.4%
1976	630	−2.5%
1981	629	−0.2%
1986	623	−1.0%

Year	Pop.	±%
1991	618	−0.8%
1996	623	+0.8%
2001	609	−2.2%
2006	553	−9.2%
2011	591	+6.9%
2016	545	−7.8%
2021	519	−4.8%

Source: Statistics Canada

Private dwellings occupied by usual residents: 252 (total dwellings: 263)

Mother tongue (2021):

- English as first language: 1.9%
- French as first language: 97.1%
- English and French as first languages: 0%
- Other as first language: 1.9%
