= Notre-Dame-du-Mont-Carmel, Quebec =

Notre-Dame-du-Mont-Carmel
- Parish municipality
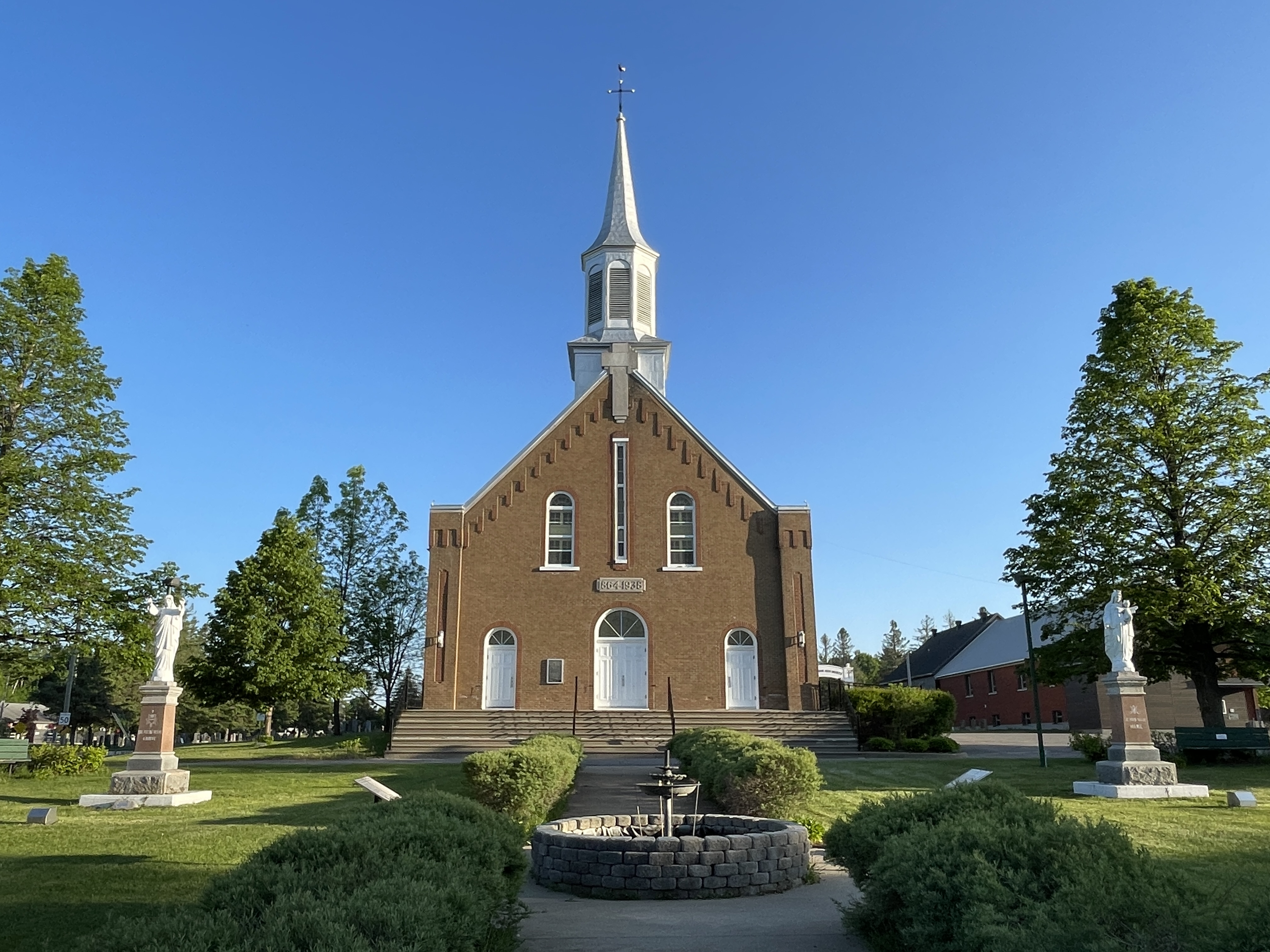
- Parish Church, 150th Anniversary Park (1959-2009)

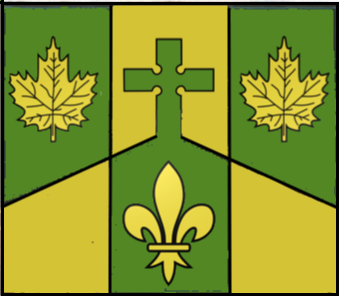
- Flag Coat of arms
- Motto: Diversité, Harmonie, Unité (French for "Diversity, Harmony, Unity")
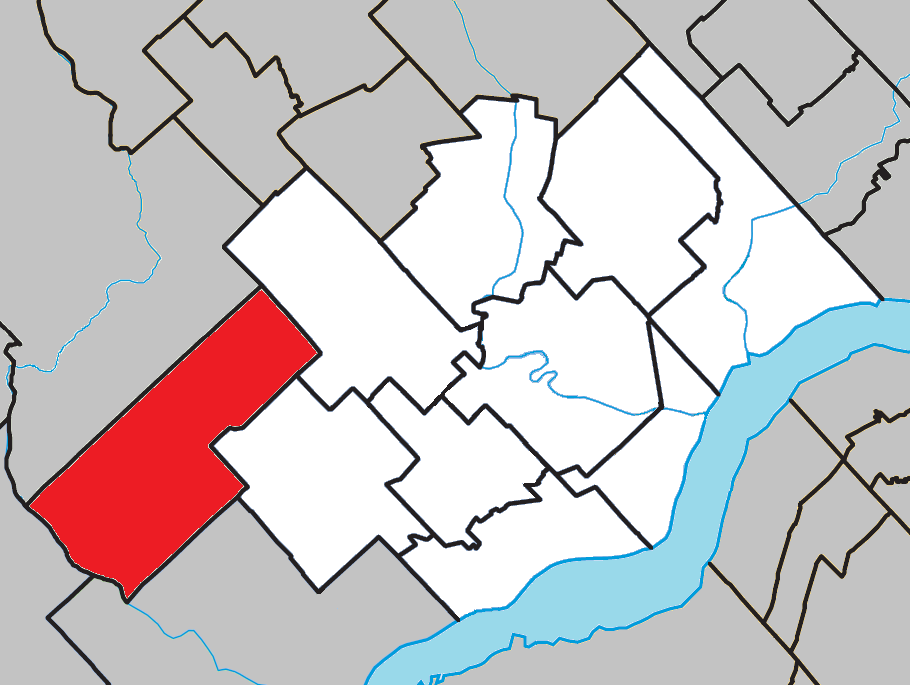
- Location within Les Chenaux RCM

- Location in central Quebec
- Coordinates: 46°29′N 72°39′W
- Country: Canada
- Province: Quebec
- Region: Mauricie
- RCM: Les Chenaux
- Settled: 1850s
- Constituted: December 30, 1858

Government
  - Mayor: Luc Dostaler
  - Fed. riding: Saint-Maurice—Champlain
  - Prov. riding: Saint-Maurice

Area
  - Total: 130.62 km^{2} (50.43 sq mi)
  - Land: 128.29 km^{2} (49.53 sq mi)

Population (2021)
  - Total: 6,121
  - Density: 47.7/km^{2} (124/sq mi)
  - Pop (2016-21): ▲6.4%
  - Dwellings: 2,678
- Time zone: UTC−5 (EST)
  - Summer (DST): UTC−4 (EDT)
- Postal code(s): G0X 3J0
- Area code(s): 819
- Highways: R-157
- Website: www.mont-carmel.org

Notre-Dame-du-Mont-Carmel (French pronunciation: [nɔtʁə dam dy mɔ̃ kaʁmɛl]) is a parish municipality in the Mauricie region of the province of Quebec in Canada.

== History ==
Settlement began in the early 1850s. The parish was established in 1858 and the following year, the Parish Municipality of Notre Dame du Mont Carmel (orthography adjusted in 1969 to include hyphens) was formed out of territory ceded by the parish municipalities of Saint Maurice and Cap de La Magdeleine. It was named after Mount Carmel in Israel due to its resemblance in topography. In 1866, the post office opened, originally called Valmont.

Until December 31, 2001, the municipality was part of Le Centre-de-la-Mauricie Regional County Municipality (which was dissolved on that date), and transferred to Les Chenaux Regional County Municipality.

== Demographics ==
In the 2021 Census of Population conducted by Statistics Canada, Notre-Dame-du-Mont-Carmel had a population of 6,121 living in 2,558 of its 2,678 total private dwellings, a change of 6.4% from its 2016 population of 5,751. With a land area of 128.29 km^{2} (49.53 sq mi), it had a population density of 47.7/km^{2} (123.6/sq mi) in 2021.

Historical census populations – Notre-Dame-du-Mont-Carmel, Quebec

Year	Pop.	±%
1871	1,239	—
1881	1,336	+7.8%
1891	2,042	+52.8%
1901	1,722	−15.7%
1911	1,757	+2.0%
1921	768	−56.3%
1931	871	+13.4%
1941	909	+4.4%

Year	Pop.	±%
1951	1,008	+10.9%
1956	1,333	+32.2%
1961	1,499	+12.5%
1966	1,648	+9.9%
1971	2,017	+22.4%
1976	2,651	+31.4%
1981	3,638	+37.2%
1986	4,054	+11.4%

Year	Pop.	±%
1991	4,610	+13.7%
1996	4,835	+4.9%
2001	5,055	+4.6%
2006	5,131	+1.5%
2011	5,467	+6.5%
2016	5,751	+5.2%
2021	6,121	+6.4%

Population counts are not adjusted for boundary changes.
Source: Statistics Canada

== Government ==
The mayor is the municipality's highest elected official. Officially, mayoral elections in Notre-Dame-du-Mont-Carmel are on a non-partisan basis.

List of former mayors (the following list may be incomplete):

- François Thellend (1860–1861)
- Michel Boisclair (1862–1863)
- Noé Lamothe (1866–1867)
- Alexandre McDougall (1870–1871)
- Joseph Lamothe (1872–1874)
- Étienne Leblanc (1875–1877)
- David Rheault (1878–1882)
- Pierre Lord (1882–1885)
- Jean Forest (1886–1887)
- Alexis Blanchette (1887–1890)
- Joseph Rheault (1892–1893)
- David Rheault (1893–1895)
- Philippe Lord (1895–1900)
- Alphonse Veilleux (1900–1903)
- Louis Marchesseault (1903–1905)
- Alexis Blanchette (1905–1910)
- Oscar Lord (1910–1914)
- Aimé Doucet (1914–1916)
- Aldéric Lamothe (1916–1927)
- Octave Lamothe (1927–1930)
- Alphonse Désilets (1930–1931)
- Alexandre Landry (1931–1951)
- Julien D. Toupin (1951–1953)
- Doris Bornais (1953–1955)
- Ferdinand Brière (1955–1959)
- Wellie Rheault (1959–1961)
- Hector Bédard (1961–1964)
- Benoît Dostaler (1964–1969)
- Roland Cossette (1969–1975)
- Léo-Paul Landry (1975–1977)
- François Brière (1977–1985)
- Pierre Bouchard (1985–1993)
- Richard Giguère (1993–1997)
- André Landry (1997–2005)
- Pierre Bouchard (2005–2013)
- Luc Dostaler (2013–present)

== See also ==
- La Gabelle Generating Station
