= Saint-Maurice, Quebec =

Saint-Maurice
- Parish municipality
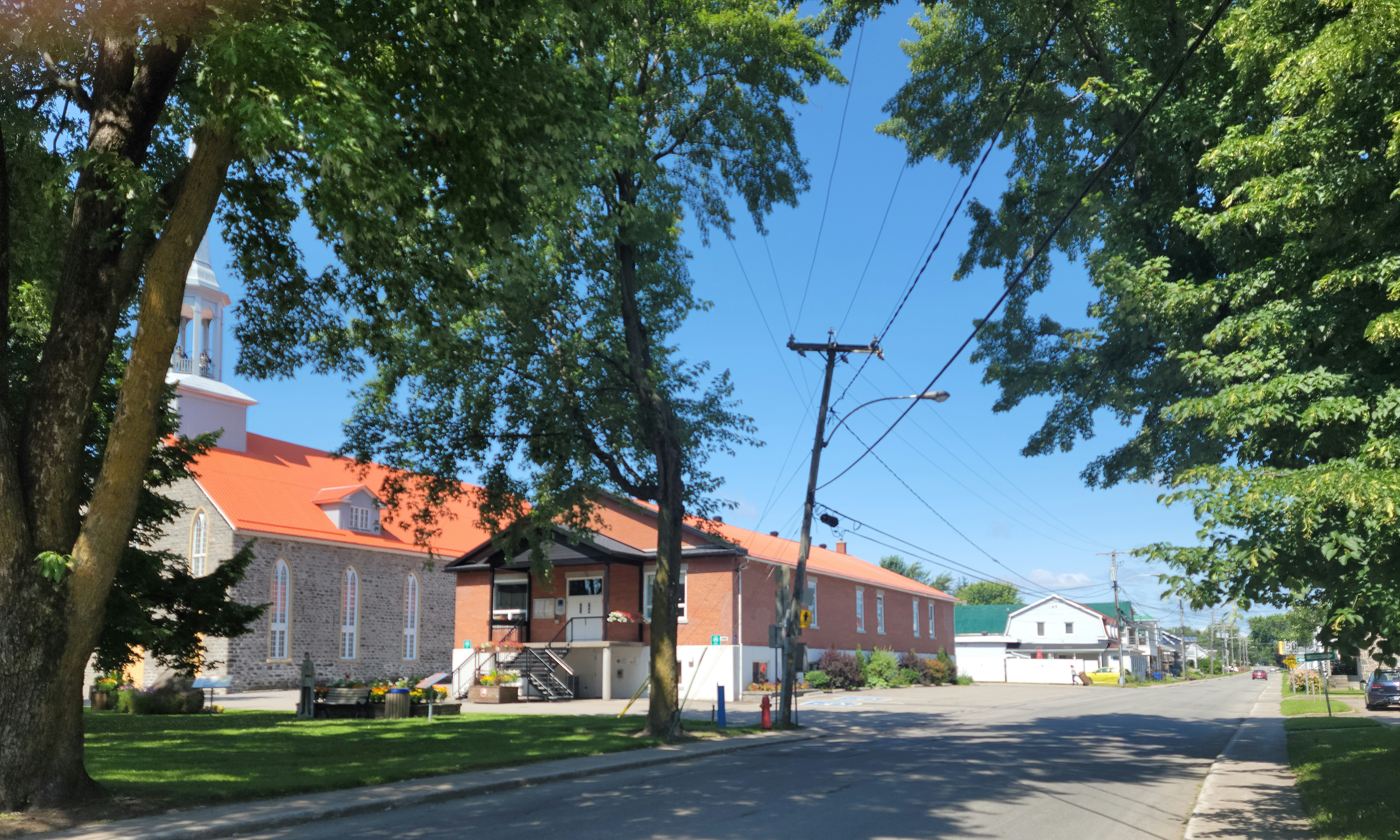
- Motto: Labeur, Valeur, Fraternité ("Labour, Value, Fraternity")
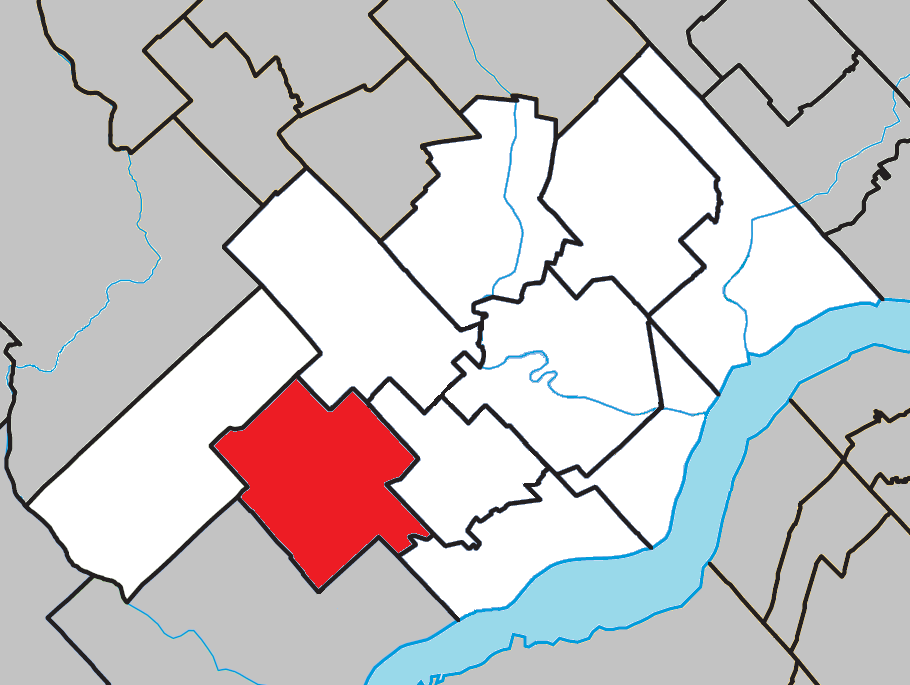
- Location within Les Chenaux RCM

- Location in central Quebec
- Coordinates: 46°28′N 72°32′W
- Country: Canada
- Province: Quebec
- Region: Mauricie
- RCM: Les Chenaux
- Constituted: July 1, 1855

Government
  - Mayor: Gérard Bruneau
  - Fed. riding: Saint-Maurice—Champlain
  - Prov. riding: Champlain

Area
  - Total: 91.07 km^{2} (35.16 sq mi)
  - Land: 91.36 km^{2} (35.27 sq mi)
- There is an apparent discrepancy between 2 authoritative sources.

Population (2021)
  - Total: 3,432
  - Density: 37.6/km^{2} (97/sq mi)
  - Pop (2016-21): ▲4.4%
  - Dwellings: 1,409
- Time zone: UTC−5 (EST)
  - Summer (DST): UTC−4 (EDT)
- Postal code(s): G0X 2X0
- Area code(s): 819
- Highways A-40: R-352
- Website: www.st-maurice.ca

Saint-Maurice (French pronunciation: [sɛ̃ mɔʁis]) is a parish municipality in the Mauricie region of the province of Quebec in Canada.

== History ==
The hagiotoponym refers to Saint Maurice.

The territory of Saint-Maurice was colonized in the early 1830s when the place was still part of the Seigneurie of Saint-Maurice. The Catholic parish was founded in 1837 and detached from the Parish of Cap-de-la-Madeleine. The territory of the original parish was much larger than that which exists today, as it also included the Saint-Louis-de-France neighborhood in Trois-Rivières and a part of the current parish of Notre-Dame-du-Mont-Carmel.

The parish municipality of Saint-Maurice was officially incorporated in 1855 during the original municipal division of Quebec. In 1858, the village of Fermont split from Saint-Maurice but was ultimately re-annexed in 1939 following the closure of the Radnor forges, the only company that supported it, and by the same token the exodus of its entire population.

Canada's first company town. The forge of Saint-Maurice was the location of Canada's first high efficiency appliance manufacturer. They made woodbox molds that could be used to make metal stoves that could burn wood inside twice as hot as an open fire. This company town was the first place where people in Canada could have a guaranteed annual salary. Over 1000 stoves were built a year in the first years of production. The stoves forged in Saint-Maurice later came to be known as the Canada stove.

In 1859, another large part of the municipality was taken away for the creation of the municipality of Notre-Dame-du-Mont-Carmel witch also included parts of the municipality of Cap-de-la-Magdeleine (today part of Trois-Rivières).

In 1904, following repeated requests from citizens living in the west of Saint-Maurice who were too far from the village and the church, a new city, Saint-Louis, was created and detached from the territory of Saint- Maurice. Saint-Louis will be renamed Saint-Louis-de-France in 1969 and will finally be annexed to Trois-Rivières in 2002. Before 1904, Saint-Maurice was therefore bounded to the west by the Saint-Maurice River and it is this natural boundary that gave its name to the territory.

Originally part of the county of Champlain, Saint-Maurice was incorporated into the regional county municipality of Francheville in 1982. In 2002, during the municipal reorganization of the region, it was included in the regional county municipality of Les Chenaux .

The church of Saint-Maurice has one of Casavant Frères' oldest organs, the opus 50, built in 1894 and still in use. With mechanical action, it has two keyboards and a pedal for around twenty games.

== Demographics ==
In the 2021 Census of Population conducted by Statistics Canada, Saint-Maurice had a population of 3,432 living in 1,360 of its 1,409 total private dwellings, a change of 4.4% from its 2016 population of 3,286. With a land area of 91.36 km^{2} (35.27 sq mi), it had a population density of 37.6/km^{2} (97.3/sq mi) in 2021.

Historical census populations – Saint-Maurice, Quebec

Year	Pop.	±%
1871	2,854	—
1881	3,049	+6.8%
1891	2,565	−15.9%
1901	2,210	−13.8%
1911	1,763	−20.2%
1921	1,639	−7.0%
1931	1,714	+4.6%
1941	1,661	−3.1%

Year	Pop.	±%
1951	1,669	+0.5%
1956	1,661	−0.5%
1961	1,644	−1.0%
1966	1,692	+2.9%
1971	1,648	−2.6%
1976	1,791	+8.7%
1981	2,089	+16.6%
1986	2,157	+3.3%

Year	Pop.	±%
1991	2,195	+1.8%
1996	2,295	+4.6%
2001	2,292	−0.1%
2006	2,338	+2.0%
2011	2,775	+18.7%
2016	3,286	+18.4%
2021	3,432	+4.4%

Population counts are not adjusted for boundary changes.
Source: Statistics Canada

Mother tongue (2021):

- English as first language: 0.9%
- French as first language: 97.2%
- English and French as first languages: 1.0%
- Other as first language: 0.9%

== Education ==
The Central Quebec School Board operates anglophone public schools, including:

- Mauricie English Elementary School in Trois-Rivières
- Three Rivers Academy in Trois-Rivières
