= Noire River (Fourche River tributary) =

- Location of the mouth of the river in Mauricie

Location
- Country: Canada
- Province: Quebec
- Region: Mauricie
- Regional County Municipality: Les Chenaux Regional County Municipality
- Municipalities: Saint-Luc-de-Vincennes and Saint-Maurice

Physical characteristics
- Source: Agricultural stream
  - location: Saint-Luc-de-Vincennes
  - coordinates: 46.531395°N 72.487241°W
  - elevation: 75
- Mouth: Rivière à la Fourche (Champlain River)
  - location: Saint-Maurice
  - coordinates: 46.489854°N 72.475756°W
  - elevation: 32 m (105 ft)
- Length: 6.8 km (4.2 mi)

Basin features
- River system: Saint Lawrence River

The Rivière Noire is a tributary of the northeast bank of the rivière à la Fourche (Champlain River), flowing in the municipalities of Saint-Luc-de-Vincennes and of Saint-Maurice, in the Les Chenaux Regional County Municipality, in the administrative region of Mauricie, in province of Quebec, in Canada.

The course of the Noire River flows from the east side of the Saint-Maurice River and the north side of the Saint Lawrence River. This river is part of the hydrographic side of the Champlain River which generally winds north-east, then south-east, to the north shore of the St. Lawrence River.

The upper part of its course is entirely in agricultural area; while the lower part of its course, south of route 352 is in the forest zone. The river surface is generally frozen from mid-December until the end of March, however the safe circulation on the ice is generally done from end of December to the beginning of March.

== Geography ==
The Black River has its source in an agricultural area bordering a wooded area. The upper part of the river flows parallel to route 359. The source of this river is located 3.8 kilometres (2.4 mi) south of the village center of Saint-Narcisse, 7.7 kilometres (4.8 mi) north-west of the confluence of the rivière à la Fourche (Champlain River) and 14.1 kilometres (8.8 mi) northwest of the north shore of the St. Lawrence River.

From its source, the Black River flows over 6.8 kilometres (4.2 mi), according to the following segments:

- 3.6 kilometres (2.2 mi) south-east in Saint-Luc-de-Vincennes, then south-west, to route 352 (route du rang Saint-Jean);
- 0.9 kilometres (0.56 mi) southwards, to the limit of Saint-Maurice;
- 2.3 kilometres (1.4 mi) South in Saint-Maurice, meandering to the confluence of the river.

The Black River flows into a bend on the northeast bank of the rivière à la Fourche (Champlain River) in the municipality of Saint-Maurice, at Southeast of route 352.

The confluence of the Black River is located at:

- 4.7 kilometres (2.9 mi) East of the village center of Saint-Maurice;
- 15.1 kilometres (9.4 mi) North of the confluence of the Champlain River;
- 10.4 kilometres (6.5 mi) north of the north shore of the St. Lawrence River.

== Toponymy ==
The toponym "Rivière Noire" was formalized on November 27, 1979, at the Commission de toponymie du Québec.

== See also ==
- St. Lawrence River, a stream
- List of rivers of Quebec
