= Rivière à la Fourche =

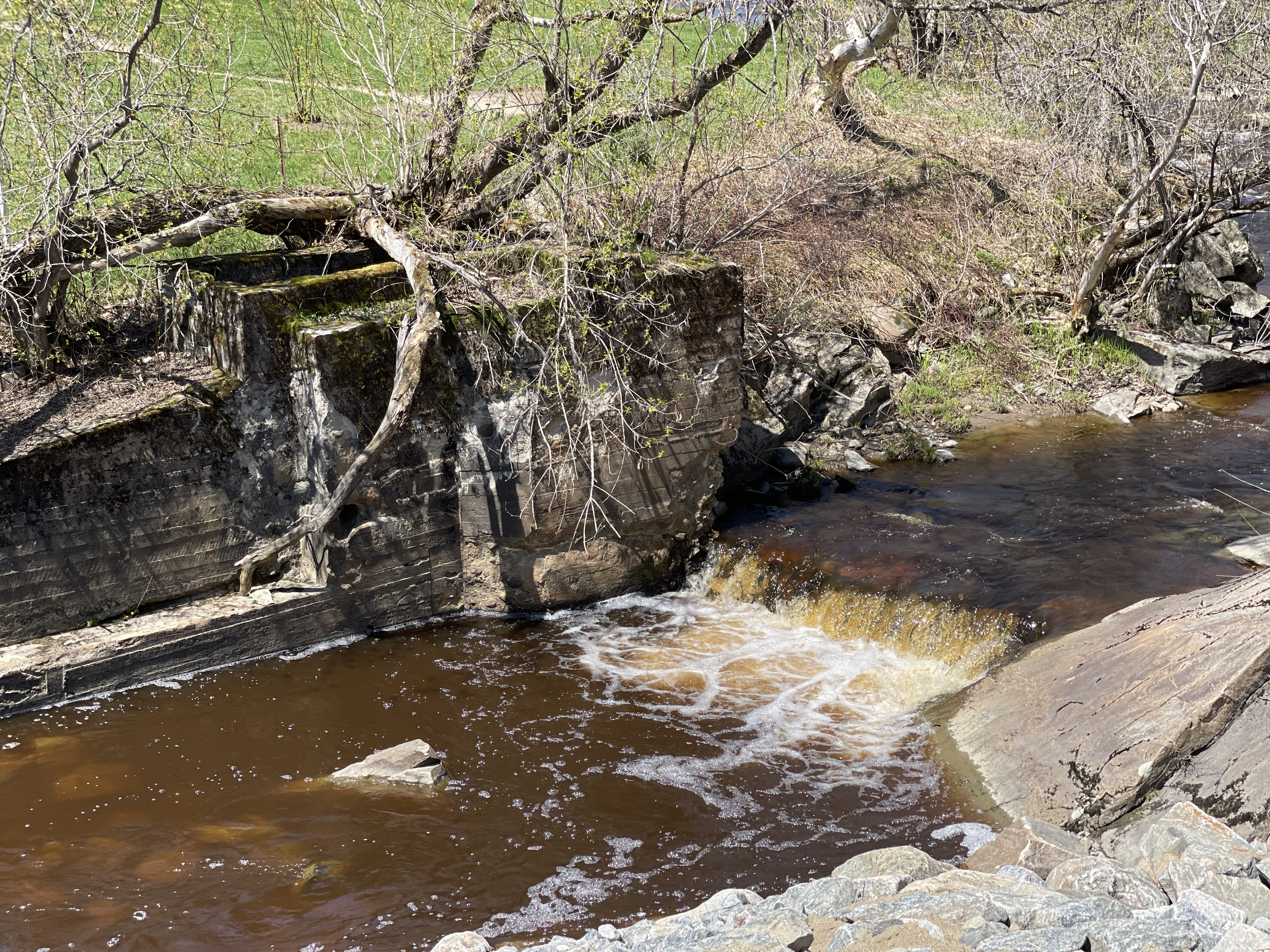
- Rang Ste-Marguerite, St-Narcisse

- Rivière à la Fourche (Quebec)

- Location of the mouth of the river in Mauricie

Location
- Country: Canada
- Province: Quebec
- Region: Mauricie
- Regional County Municipality: Les Chenaux Regional County Municipality
- Municipalities: Notre-Dame-du-Mont-Carmel and Saint-Luc-de-Vincennes

Physical characteristics
- Source: Plé de Saint-Narcisse
  - location: Notre-Dame-du-Mont-Carmel, Les Chenaux Regional County Municipality, Quebec, Canada
  - coordinates: 46.574186°N 72.580814°W
  - elevation: 124
- Mouth: Champlain River
  - location: Saint-Luc-de-Vincennes, Les Chenaux Regional County Municipality
  - coordinates: 46.466097°N 72.445664°W
  - elevation: 18 m
- Length: 21.5 km (13.4 mi)

Basin features
- River system: Saint Lawrence River

The rivière à la Fourche (English: Fork River) is a tributary of the northwest bank of the Champlain River, flowing on the east side of the Saint-Maurice River and on the north side of the St. Lawrence River, in the Les Chenaux Regional County Municipality, in the administrative region of Mauricie, in province of Quebec, in Canada.

The course of the “Fourche river” crosses the municipalities of Notre-Dame-du-Mont-Carmel, Saint-Narcisse, Saint-Maurice, Quebec and Saint-Luc-de-Vincennes. This river is part of the hydrographic side of the Champlain River which generally winds north-east, then south-east, to the north shore of the St. Lawrence River.

The course of the Fourche River crosses forest and agricultural areas discontinuously. The river surface is generally frozen from mid-December until the end of March.

== Geography ==
The “Fourche River” has its source in the eastern part of Plé de Saint-Narcisse, in the northeast area of the municipality of Notre-Dame-du-Mont-Carmel. The southern zone of this wetland is drained by the Rivière au Lard (Les Chenaux), the eastern zone by the rivière aux Rouilles and the northern zone by the rivière des Chutes and the Turtle River (via the Lac à la Tortue).

From Plé de Saint-Narcisse, the Fourche River flows over 21.5 kilometres (13.4 mi), according to the following segments:

- 0.5 kilometres (0.31 mi) East in Notre-Dame-du-Mont-Carmel, to the limit of Saint-Narcisse;
- 4.0 kilometres (2.5 mi) south-east in Saint-Narcisse, to route 359 (route du 3e rang);
- 3.0 kilometres (1.9 mi) towards the South-East by forming a curve towards the North-East to come back to cut the route 359 (route du 3e rang);
- 3.8 kilometres (2.4 mi) towards the South-East by crossing the road of rang Saint-Félix, until the road of rang Sainte-Marguerite, corresponding to the limit of Saint-Luc-de-Vincennes;
- 1.0 kilometre (0.62 mi) towards the south in Saint-Luc-de-Vincennes, by forming a hook towards the North-East, up to the limit of Saint-Maurice;
- 4.8 kilometres (3.0 mi) to the south, then to the east in Saint-Maurice, winding up to route 352 (route du rang Saint-Jean);
- 3.1 kilometres (1.9 mi) towards the South-East, winding up to the confluence of the Noire River (Fourche River tributary);
- 1.3 kilometres (0.81 mi) towards the South-East, winding up to the limit of Saint-Luc-de-Vincennes;
- 4.9 kilometres (3.0 mi) towards the Southeast in Saint-Luc-de-Vincennes, meandering to the confluence of the river.

The “Fourche River” flows on the northwest bank of the Champlain River in the municipality of Saint-Luc-de-Vincennes.

The confluence of the “Fourche river” is located at:

- 12.2 kilometres (7.6 mi) North of the confluence of the Champlain River;
- 6.5 kilometres (4.0 mi) north of the north shore of the St. Lawrence River;
- 6.4 kilometres (4.0 mi) East of downtown Saint-Maurice.

== Toponymy ==
The toponym "Rivière à la Fourche" was formalized on December 5, 1968, at the Commission de toponymie du Québec.

== Photos ==
Rivière à la Fourche (rivière Champlain)

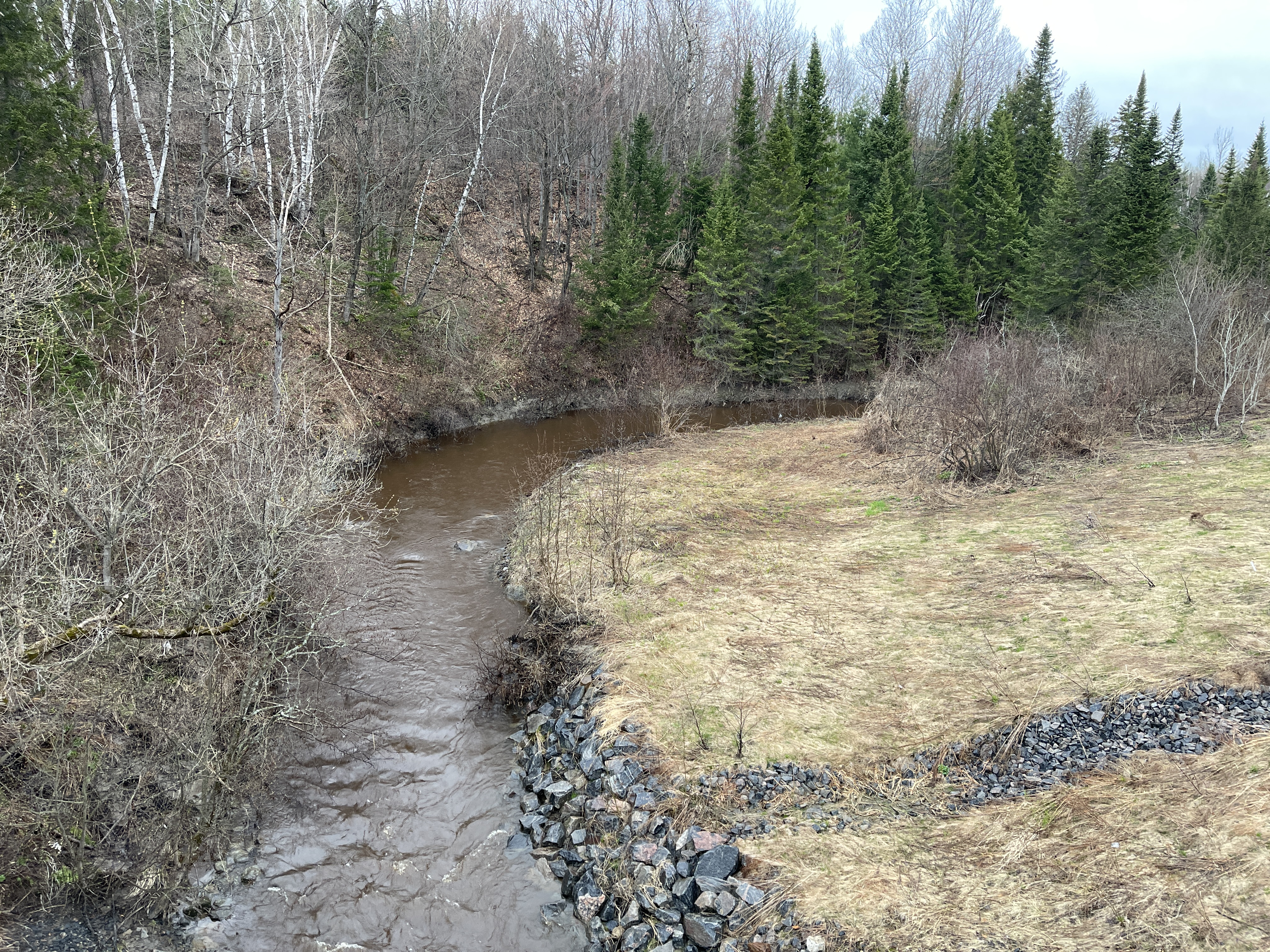
From bridge 18231, rang St-Félix, St-Narcisse

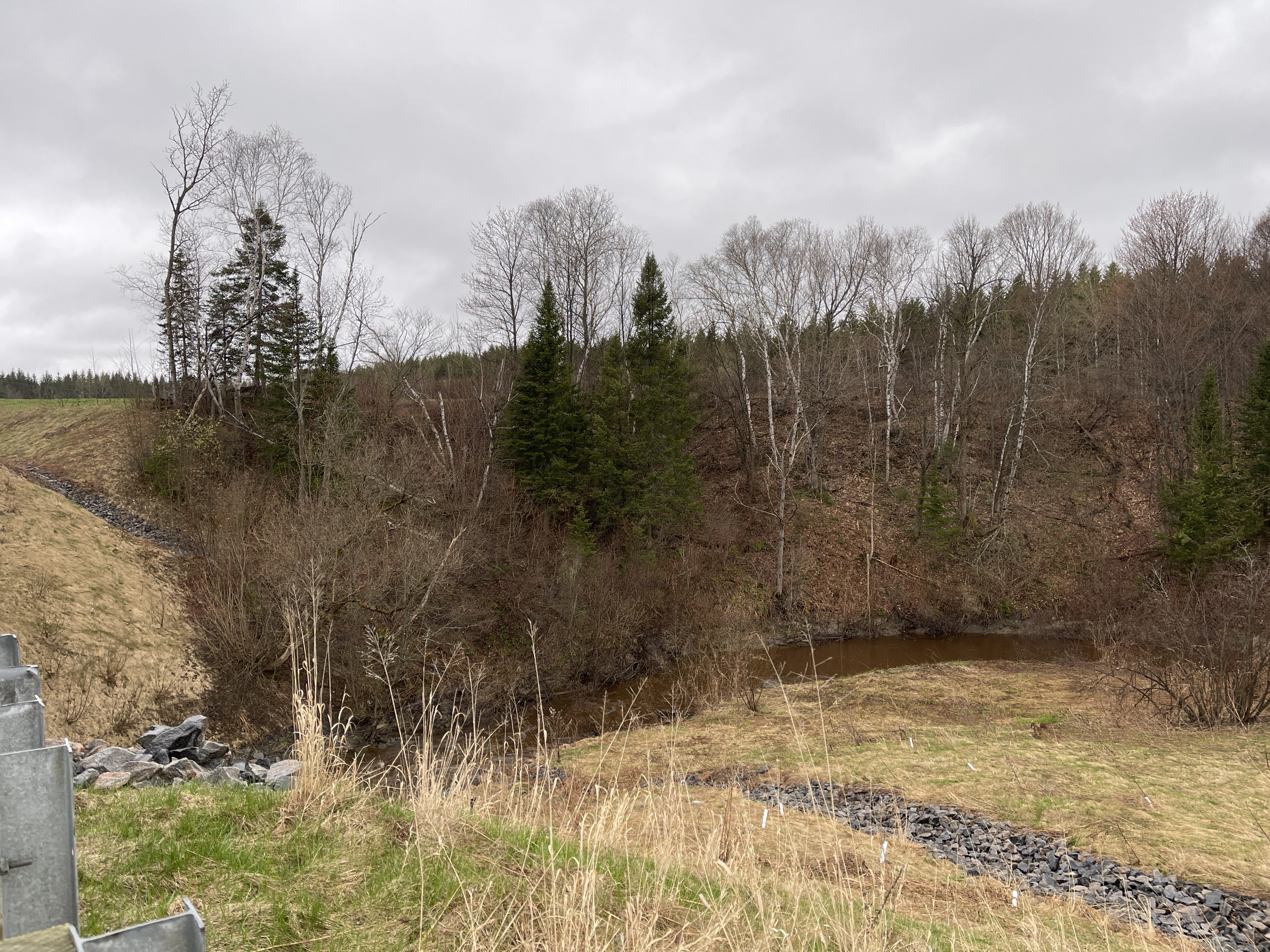
From bridge 18231, rang St-Félix, St-Narcisse

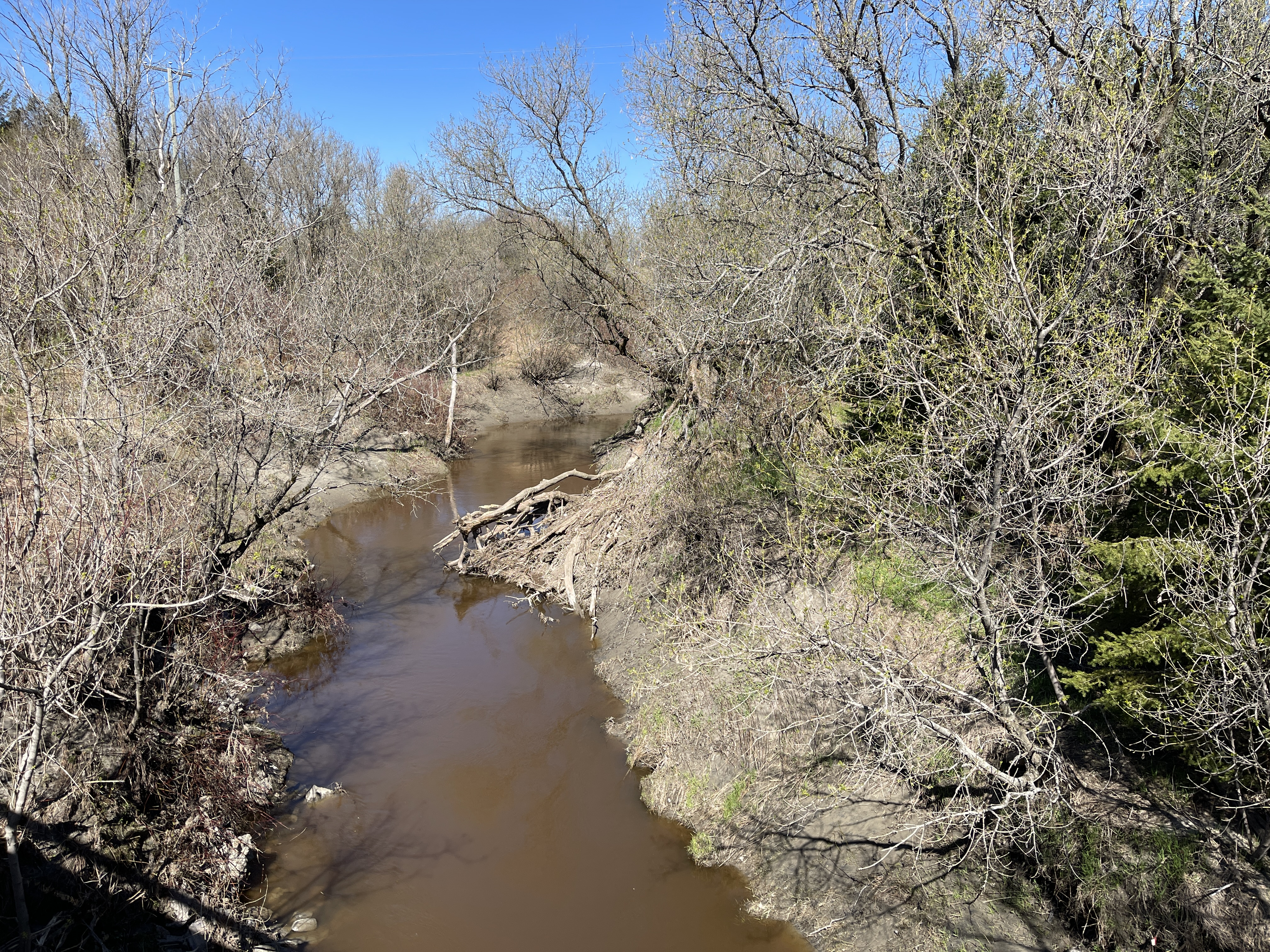
From bridge P-01569, rang St-Alexis, St-Luc-de-Vincennes

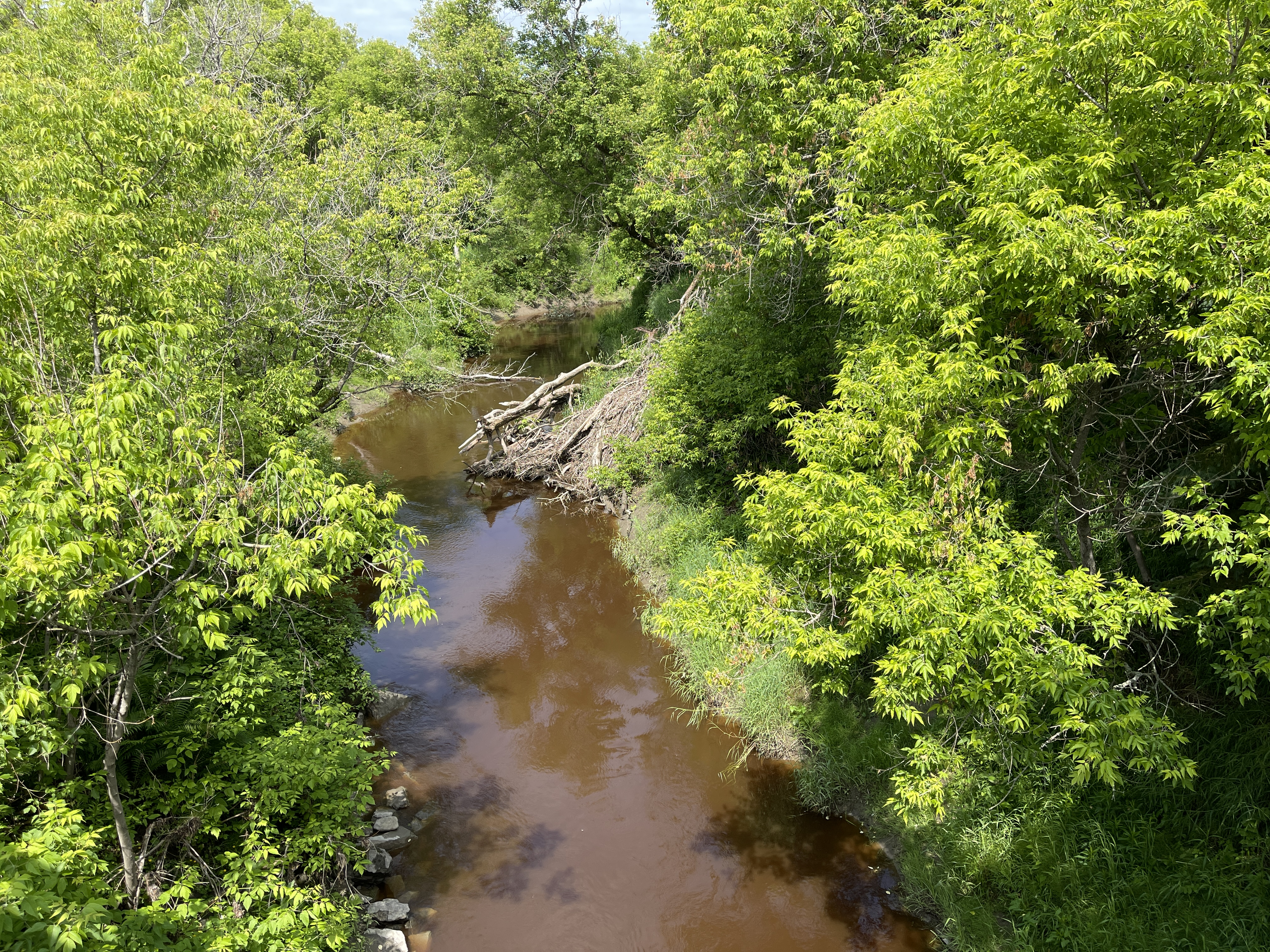
From bridge P-01569, Saint-Luc-de-Vincennes,

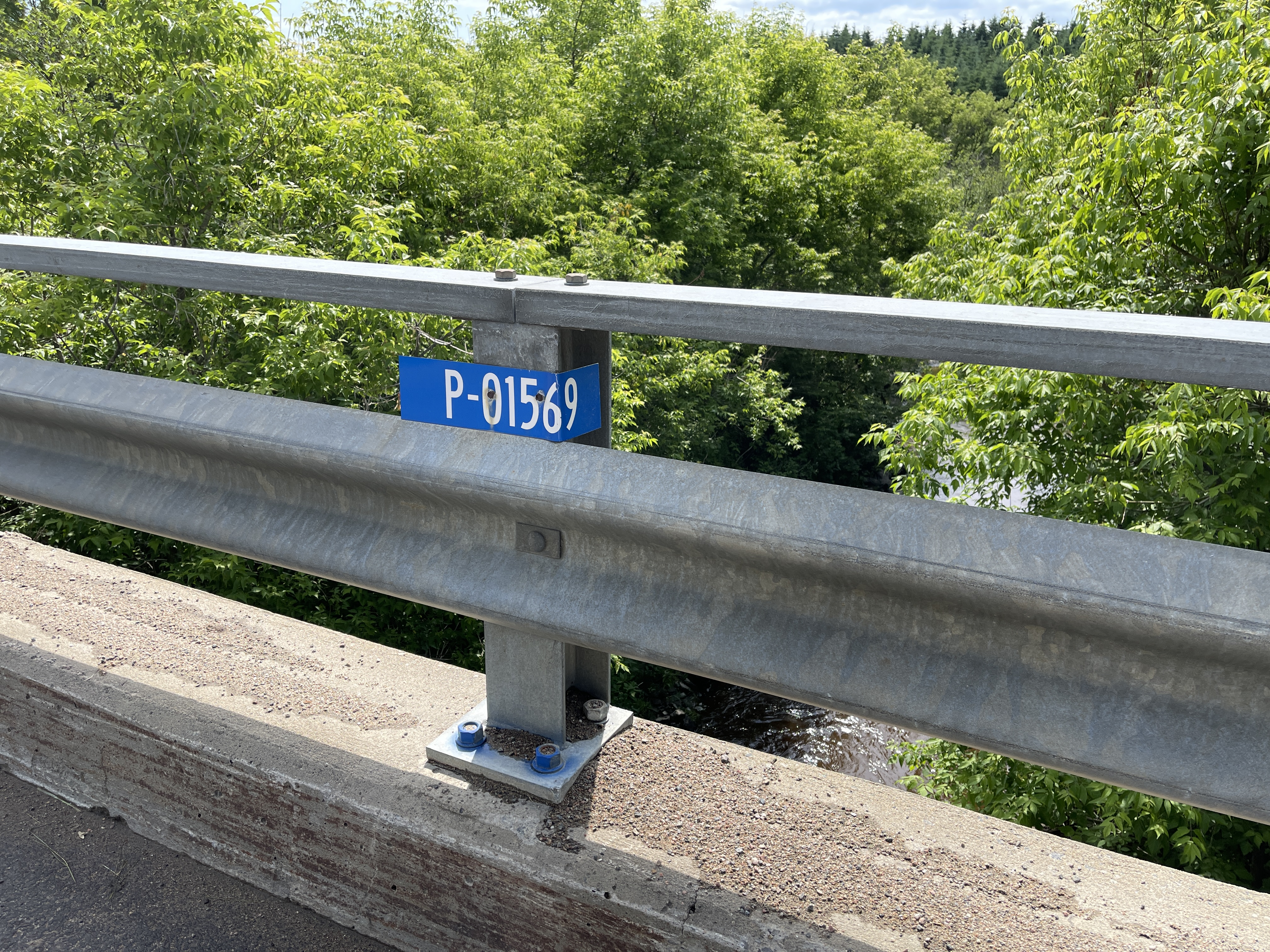
Pannel, bridge P-01569

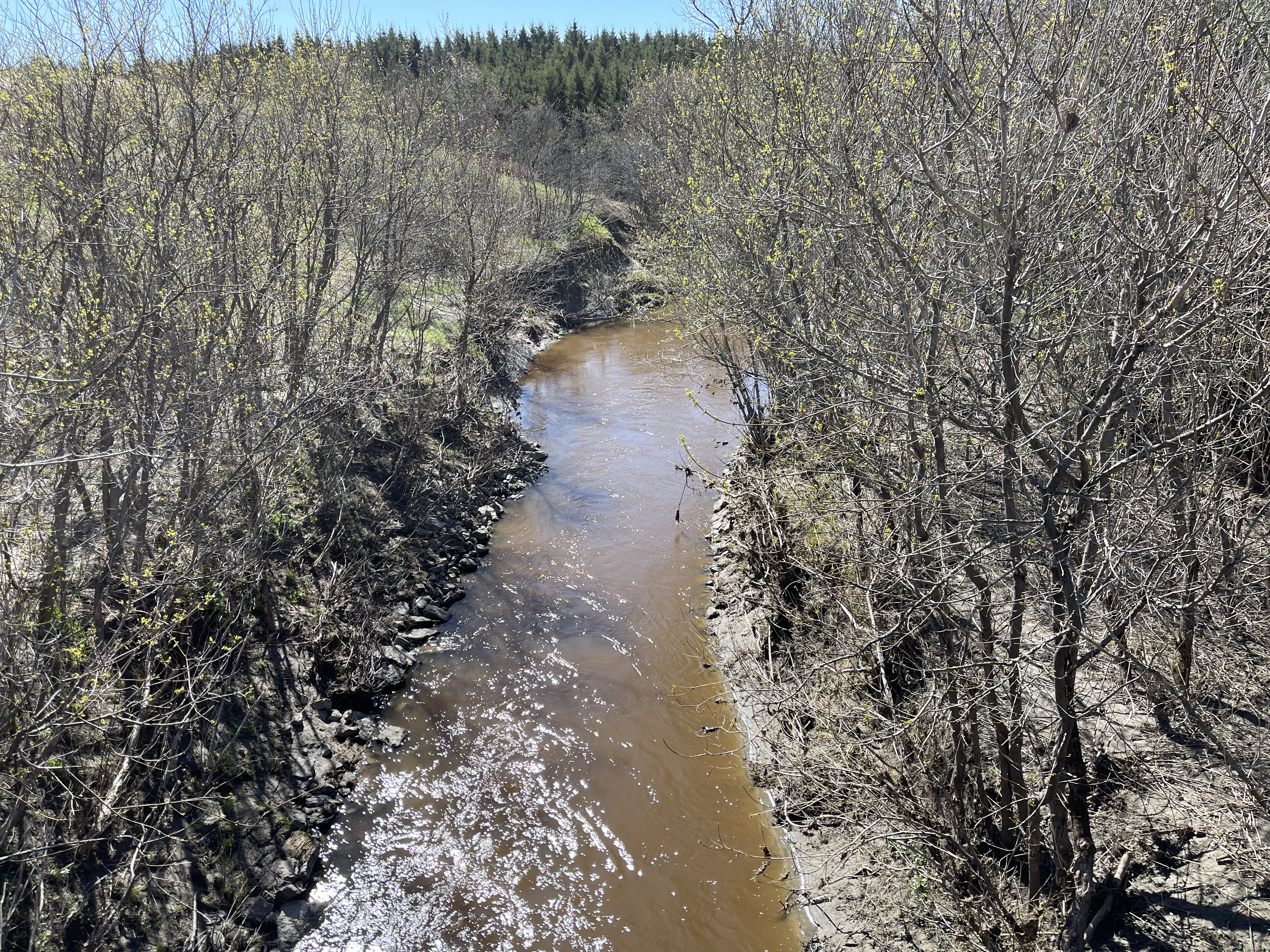
From bridge P-01569, rang St-Alexis, St-Luc-de-Vincennes

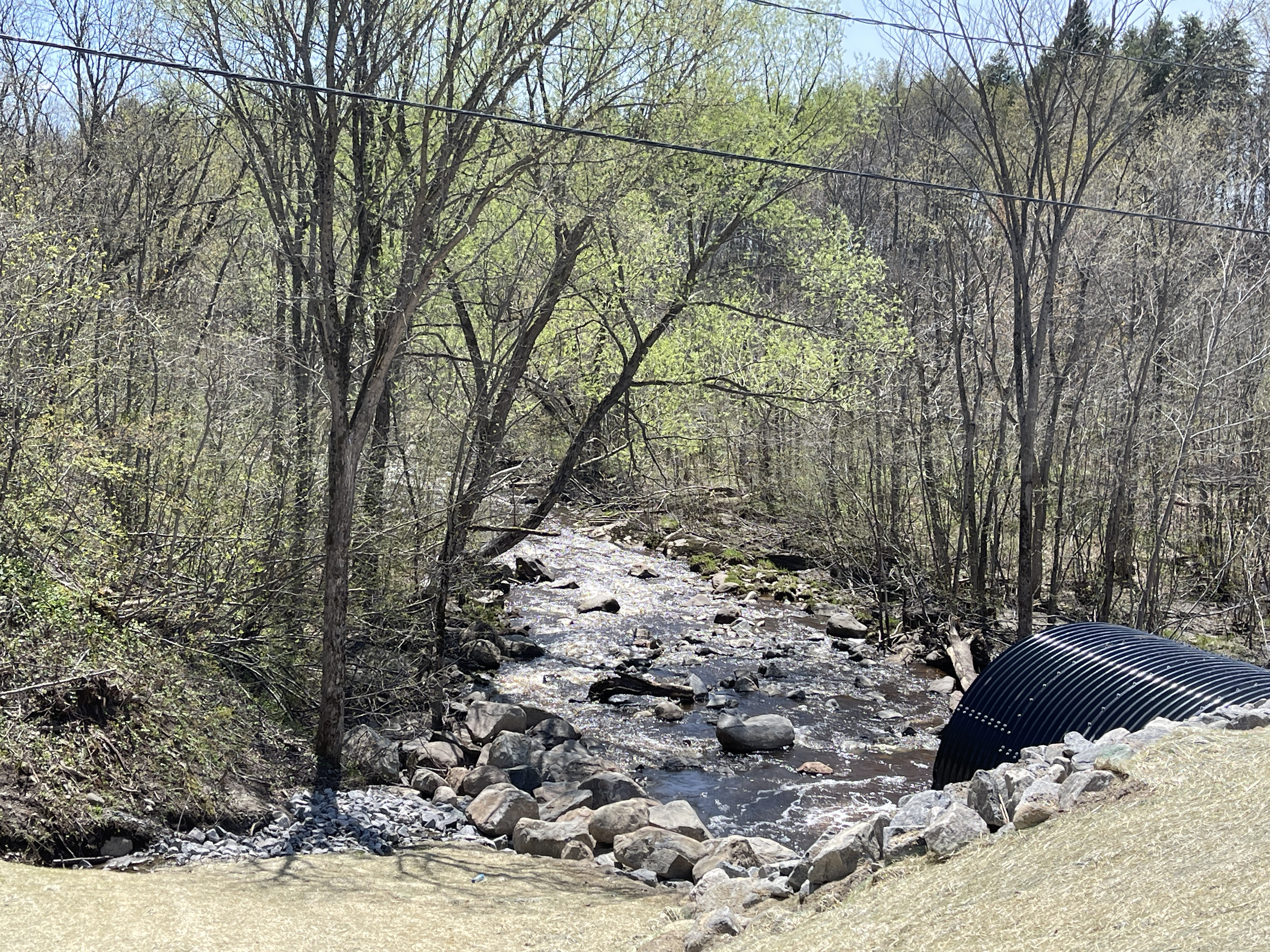
Rang Sainte-Marguerite, St-Narcisse

== See also ==
- List of rivers of Quebec
