= Ruisseau du Moulin (île d'Orléans) =

Location
- Country: Canada
- Province: Quebec
- Region: Capitale-Nationale
- MRC: L'Île-d'Orléans Regional County Municipality
- Municipality: Sainte-Famille-de-l'Île-d'Orléans, Saint-François-de-l'Île-d'Orléans

Physical characteristics
- Source: Confluence of two agricultural and forest streams
  - location: Sainte-Famille-de-l'Île-d'Orléans
  - coordinates: 46°58′39″N 70°54′07″W
  - elevation: 90 m (300 ft)
- Mouth: Chenal de l'Île d'Orléans (Saint Lawrence River)
  - location: Saint-François-de-l'Île-d'Orléans
  - coordinates: 46°01′18″N 70°50′12″W
  - elevation: 4 m (13 ft)
- Length: 8.5 km (5.3 mi)

The ruisseau du Moulin (French pronunciation: [ʁɥiso dy mulɛ̃], lit. 'brook of the Mill') is a tributary of chenal de l'Île d'Orléans, flowing in the municipality of Sainte-Famille-de-l'Île-d'Orléans and Saint-François-de-l'Île-d'Orléans, in the regional county municipality (MRC) of L'Île-d'Orléans Regional County Municipality, in the administrative region of Capitale-Nationale, in the province of Quebec, of Canada.

The lower part of this small valley is served by Chemin Royale (route 368) which bypasses all of Île d'Orléans. Agriculture is the main economic activity in this small valley.

The surface of the Moulin stream is generally frozen from the beginning of December until the end of March, except for the rapids areas in the lower part; however, safe circulation on the ice is generally done from mid-December to mid-March. The water level of the river varies with the seasons and the precipitation; the spring flood occurs in March or April.

== Geography ==
The Moulin stream rises at the limit of the forest and agricultural area, more or less in the center of the island, in Sainte-Famille-de-l'Île-d'Orléans. This source is located 1.8 kilometres (1.1 mi) northwest of a curve of the Dauphine River, 3.0 kilometres (1.9 mi) southeast of the chenal de l'Île d'Orléans and 4.2 kilometres (2.6 mi) northeast of the shore of the St. Lawrence River (Chenal des Grands Voiliers).

From this source, the course of the Moulin stream descends on 8.5 kilometres (5.3 mi), with a drop of 86 metres (282 ft), according to the following segments:

- 7.0 kilometres (4.3 mi) north-east first in the forest zone, then entering the agricultural zone, crossing rapids on 2.4 kilometres (1.5 mi), up to route 368;
- 1.5 kilometres (0.93 mi) towards the northeast by forming some streamers at the start of the segment, with a drop of 32 metres (105 ft), crossing rapids, to its mouth.

The Moulin stream flows to the bottom of Anse aux Canards, near the Pointe de la Croix. This mouth is located on the south shore of the chenal de l'Île d'Orléans (which is connected to the St. Lawrence River) in Saint-François-de-l'Île-d'Orléans. At this location, the chenal de l'Île d'Orléans is 2.7 kilometres (1.7 mi) wide.

== Toponymy ==
Formerly, this watercourse was designated "Argentenay river". The point located at the extreme north of the island is designated Pointe Argentenay; it is surrounded by sandstone at low tide. The toponym "ruisseau du Moulin" refers to a modest mill erected in the 18th century along its course, probably near the mouth. According to the popular usage of the inhabitants of the island, this river is considered a river and not a stream. Three rivers of this island are designated according to the existence of a mill built on their respective course.

The toponym "brook of the Moulin" was formalized on December 5, 1968 at the Bank of Place Names of the Commission de toponymie du Québec.

== See also ==
- Capitale-Nationale, an administrative region
- L'Île-d'Orléans Regional County Municipality (MRC)
- Île d'Orléans, an island
- Sainte-Famille-de-l'Île-d'Orléans
- Saint-François-de-l'Île-d'Orléans
- Chenal de l'Île d'Orléans
- St. Lawrence River
- List of rivers of Quebec
