= Rivière du Moulin (Saint-Pierre-de-l'Île-d'Orléans) =

Location
- Country: Canada
- Province: Quebec
- Region: Capitale-Nationale
- MRC: L'Île-d'Orléans Regional County Municipality
- Municipality: Saint-Pierre-de-l'Île-d'Orléans

Physical characteristics
- Source: Agricultural area
  - location: Saint-Pierre-de-l'Île-d'Orléans
  - coordinates: 46°54′55″N 71°01′40″W
  - elevation: 110 m (360 ft)
- Mouth: Chenal de l'Île d'Orléans (Saint Lawrence River)
  - location: Saint-Pierre-de-l'Île-d'Orléans
  - coordinates: 46°53′54″N 71°05′22″W
  - elevation: 4 m (13 ft)
- Length: 6.4 km (4.0 mi)

The rivière du Moulin (French pronunciation: [ʁivjɛʁ dy mulɛ̃], lit. 'River of the Mill') is a tributary of chenal de l'Île d'Orléans, flowing in the municipality of Saint-Pierre-de-l'Île-d'Orléans, in the L'Île-d'Orléans Regional County Municipality, in the administrative region of Capitale-Nationale, in the province of Quebec, in Canada.

The lower part of this small valley is served by Chemin Royale (route 368) which bypasses all of Île d'Orléans. Besides the area near the main road, agriculture is the main economic activity in this small valley.

The surface of the Moulin river is generally frozen from the beginning of December until the end of March, except the rapids areas; however, safe circulation on the ice is generally done from mid-December to mid-March. The water level of the river varies with the seasons and the precipitation; the spring flood occurs in March or April.

== Geography ==
The Moulin river takes an agricultural area in Saint-Pierre-de-l'Île-d'Orléans, south of a marsh area which is also drained on the north side by the rivière Pot au Beurre (île d'Orléans) and on the east side by a stream on the side of the Maheu River. This marsh straddles the boundary of the municipalities of Sainte-Famille-de-l'Île-d'Orléans and Saint-Pierre-de-l'Île-d'Orléans. This source of the Moulin river is located 5.9 kilometres (3.7 mi) west of the mouth of the Maheu River, 1.8 kilometres (1.1 mi) east from chenal de l'Île d'Orléans and 4.4 kilometres (2.7 mi) northeast of the village center of Saint-Pierre-de-l'Île-d'Orléans.

From this source, the course of the Moulin stream descends on 6.4 kilometres (4.0 mi), with a drop of 106 metres (348 ft), according to the following segments:

- 3.6 kilometres (2.2 mi) to the southwest in an agricultural area with a slight drop, to route 368 (chemin Royal). Note: In Saint-Pierre-de-l'Île-d'Orléans, this road is between 1.0 kilometre (0.62 mi) and 1.7 kilometres (1.1 mi) from the shore, compared to the rest of the island;
- 2.8 kilometres (1.7 mi) towards the south-west passing from the north-west side of the village of Saint-Pierre and forming a large curve to head west, with a drop of 82 metres (269 ft), to its mouth.

The Moulin river flows on the south bank of the chenal de l'Île d'Orléans (which is connected to the Saint Lawrence River) at the height of the village of Saint-Pierre-de-l'Île-d'Orléans. At this location, the chenal de l'Île d'Orléans is 1.3 kilometres (0.81 mi) wide. This mouth faces the center of the village of L'Ange-Gardien.

== Toponymy ==
The toponym "Rivière du Moulin" refers to a mill erected in the 17th century along its course, probably in the lower part. Three watercourses of this island are designated according to the existence of a mill built on their respective watercourse.

The toponym "rivière du Moulin" was formalized on August 8, 1977 at the Place Names Bank of the Commission de toponymie du Québec.

== See also ==
- Capitale-Nationale, an administrative region
- L'Île-d'Orléans Regional County Municipality (MRC)
- Île d'Orléans, an island
- Saint-Pierre-de-l'Île-d'Orléans
- Chenal de l'Île d'Orléans
- St. Lawrence River
- List of rivers of Quebec
