= Lafleur River =

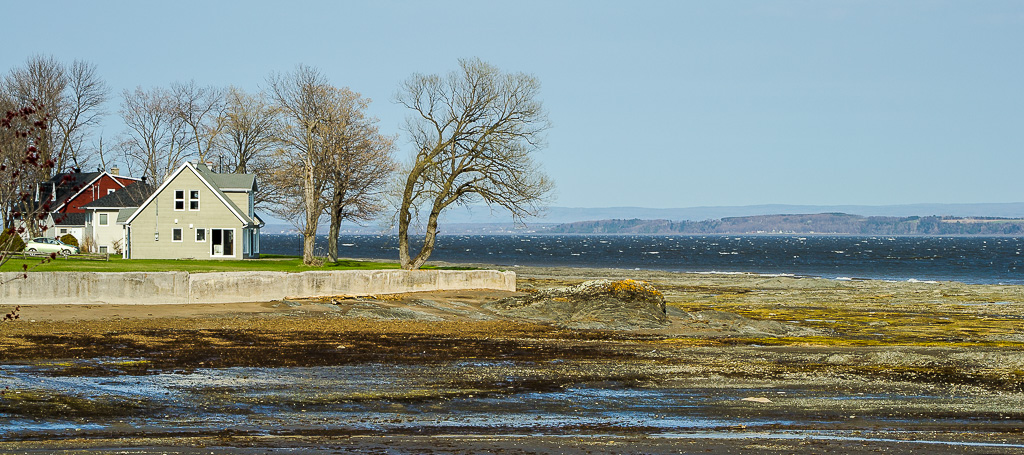
- Mouth of Lafleur River

Location
- Country: Canada
- Province: Quebec
- Region: Capitale-Nationale
- MRC: L'Île-d'Orléans Regional County Municipality
- Municipality: Saint-Jean-de-l'Île-d'Orléans

Physical characteristics
- Source: Agricultural and forestry streams (Les Savanes marsh)
  - location: Saint-Jean-de-l'Île-d'Orléans
  - coordinates: 46°56′29″N 70°55′27″W
  - elevation: 68 m (223 ft)
- Mouth: Chenal des Grands Voiliers (Saint Lawrence River)
  - location: Saint-Jean-de-l'Île-d'Orléans
  - coordinates: 46°54′14″N 70°55′51″W
  - elevation: 4 m (13 ft)
- Length: 5.2 km (3.2 mi)

The Rivière Lafleur (French pronunciation: [ʁivjɛʁ laflœʁ]), sometimes called Rivière à la Fleur ([ʁivjɛʁ a la flœʁ]), is a watercourse of the Île d'Orléans located between the Maheu River and the village of Saint-Jean-de-l'Île-d'Orléans. Its course is exclusively in the municipality of Saint-Jean-de-l'Île-d'Orléans, in the L'Île-d'Orléans Regional County Municipality, in the administrative region of Capitale-Nationale, in the province of Quebec, in Canada.

It flows into a small harbour in the St. Lawrence River. It has long offered in its mouth a shelter for fishing boats stranded at low tide.

The lower part of this small valley is served by Chemin Royale (route 368) which runs along the southeast shore of Île d'Orléans. Agriculture is the main economic activity in the upper part of this valley.

The surface of the Lafleur River is generally frozen from the beginning of December until the end of March; however, safe circulation on the ice is generally done from mid-December to mid-March. The water level of the river varies with the seasons and the precipitation; the spring flood occurs in March or April.

== Geography ==
The Lafleur river originates in the "Les Savanes" marshes (altitude: 68 metres (223 ft)), at the limit of the forest and agricultural zones, in Saint-Jean-de-l'Île-d'Orléans. This source is located 0.34 kilometres (0.21 mi) southwest of the Mitan road, 4.9 kilometres (3.0 mi) southeast of the chenal de l'Île d'Orléans and 3.4 kilometres (2.1 mi) northeast of the shore of the St. Lawrence River (Chenal des Grands Voiliers).

From this source, the course of the Lafleur river descends on 5.2 kilometres (3.2 mi), with a drop of 64 metres (210 ft), according to the following segments:

- 2.9 kilometres (1.8 mi) towards the southwest by following more or less the limit of the forest zone in Saint-Jean-de-l'Île-d'Orléans, then generally in agricultural zone at the end of the segment, up to a bend in the river;
- 2.3 kilometres (1.4 mi) southward generally in agricultural area, to its mouth.

The Lafleur river flows at the bottom of a small harbour (length: 0.5 kilometres (0.31 mi) at low tide), in the hamlet "Rivière Lafleur" in Saint-Jean-de-l'Île-d'Orléans. The bridge at route 368 spans the Lafleur River near its mouth. This harbour whose sandstone of about 0.3 kilometres (0.19 mi) at low tide, is attached to Chenal des Grands Voiliers whose width is 3.3 metres (11 ft) at this location. This channel is crossed by the St. Lawrence River.

== Toponymy ==
The toponym "Lafleur river" evokes the surname of a resident of French descent by the name of Dumont dit Lafleur, who in 1681 owned land in this area of Saint-Jean-de-l'Île-d'Orléans, in the south-east of the island. The name of the Lafleur river appears on the map of Villeneuve of 1689, under the spelling "Rivière à la Fleur".

The 1709 plan of Gideon of Catalonia rather includes the designation of "Ruiso at the Fountain" to identify this watercourse. Then, the original designation of the watercourse comes back into force with an evolving spelling according to the authors: "Rivière La Fleur" according to Le géographe Joseph Bouchette (1831); "Lafleur River" according to the 1914 Dictionary of Rivers and Lakes of the Province of Quebec; "Rivière à la Fleur" according to the Geographic Directory of Quebec in 1969 and finally "Rivière Lafleur" in 1978 according to the Toponymic Directory of Quebec published by the Commission de toponymie.

The current spelling of the toponym is formalized on March 28, 1974 at the Place Names Bank of the Commission de toponymie du Québec.

== See also ==
- L'Île-d'Orléans Regional County Municipality
- Île d'Orléans, an island
- Saint-Jean-de-l'Île-d'Orléans, a municipality
- St. Lawrence River
- Chenal des Grands Voiliers
- List of rivers of Quebec
- List of islands of Canada § Quebec
