= Rivière du Moulin (Saint-Laurent-de-l'Île d'Orléans) =

- Location within Quebec

Location
- Country: Canada
- Province: Quebec
- Region: Capitale-Nationale
- MRC: L'Île-d'Orléans Regional County Municipality
- Municipality: Saint-Laurent-de-l'Île-d'Orléans

Physical characteristics
- Source: Agricultural and forestry stream
  - location: Saint-Laurent-de-l'Île-d'Orléans
  - coordinates: 46°52′43″N 71°01′44″W
  - elevation: 107 m (351 ft)
- Mouth: Chenal des Grands Voiliers (Saint Lawrence River)
  - location: Saint-Laurent-de-l'Île-d'Orléans
  - coordinates: 46°52′39″N 70°58′38″W
  - elevation: 4 m (13 ft)
- Length: 5.8 km (3.6 mi)

The Rivière du Moulin (French pronunciation: [ʁivjɛʁ dy mulɛ̃], lit. 'River of the Mill') flows in the municipality of Saint-Laurent-de-l'Île-d'Orléans, in the L'Île-d'Orléans Regional County Municipality, in the administrative region of Capitale-Nationale, in the province of Quebec, in Canada.

The lower part of this small valley is served by Chemin Royale (route 368) which runs along the southeast shore of Île d'Orléans. Apart from the village area, near its mouth, agriculture is the main activity of this small valley.

The surface of the Moulin river is generally frozen from the beginning of December until the end of March; however, safe circulation on the ice is generally done from mid-December to mid-March. The water level of the river varies with the seasons and the precipitation; the spring flood occurs in March or April.

== Geography ==
The Moulin river takes its source at the limit of the forest and agricultural area, that is on the northwest side of the Coast at Gobeil, in Saint-Laurent-de-l'Île-d'Orléans. This source is located 1.2 kilometres (0.75 mi) southeast of the Maheu River, 4.4 kilometres (2.7 mi) southeast of the chenal de l'Île d'Orléans and 2.4 kilometres (1.5 mi) north-east of the shore of the Saint Lawrence River (Chenal des Grands Voiliers).

From this source, the course of the Moulin river descends on 5.8 kilometres (3.6 mi), with a drop of 103 metres (338 ft), according to the following segments:

- 4.1 kilometres (2.5 mi) first towards the northeast first in the forest zone, then entering the agricultural zone and crossing a golf course, up to a bend of the river corresponding to a stream (coming from the north and draining six small lakes);
- 1.7 kilometres (1.1 mi) to the south-east, then east, with a drop of 65 metres (213 ft) down the hill to Filion, and through the village of Saint- Laurent-d'Orléans, to its mouth.

The Moulin river flows at the bottom of Anse de l'Église, on the northwest bank of the Chenal des Grands Voiliers (which is crossed by the Saint-Laurent river) in Saint-Laurent-de-l'Île-d'Orléans. Here, the sandstone is around 0.24 kilometres (0.15 mi) at low tide and the Chenal des Grands Voiliers is 2.95 metres (9 ft 8 in) wide. A marina is built on the point advancing south-east on the east side of the cove.

== Toponymy ==
The toponym "river of the Mill" originates from the existence of a mill which would have been erected in the XVIIth century undoubtedly in the lower part of its course.

The toponym "Rivière du Moulin" was formalized on February 11, 1971 at the Place Names Bank of the Commission de toponymie du Québec.

== See also ==
- Capitale-Nationale, an administrative region
- L'Île-d'Orléans Regional County Municipality
- Île d'Orléans, an island
- Saint-Laurent-de-l'Île-d'Orléans
- Chenal des Grands Voiliers
- St. Lawrence River
- List of rivers of Quebec
