= Dauphine River =

River in Quebec, Canada

Location
- Country: Canada
- Province: Quebec
- Region: Capitale-Nationale
- MRC: L'Île-d'Orléans Regional County Municipality
- Municipality: Sainte-Famille-de-l'Île-d'Orléans, Saint-Jean-de-l'Île-d'Orléans

Physical characteristics
- Source: Little lake
  - location: Sainte-Famille-de-l'Île-d'Orléans
  - coordinates: 46°57′39″N 70°57′25″W
  - elevation: 111 m (364 ft)
- Mouth: Chenal des Grands Voiliers (Saint Lawrence River)
  - location: Saint-Jean-de-l'Île-d'Orléans
  - coordinates: 46°58′06″N 70°50′41″W
  - elevation: 4 m (13 ft)
- Length: 11.3 km (7.0 mi)

Basin features
- Tributaries
  - right: Le Grand Ruisseau

The Dauphine River is a river in Quebec, Canada. It flows through the municipalities of Sainte-Famille-de-l'Île-d'Orléans and Saint-Jean-de-l'Île-d'Orléans, in the L'Île-d'Orléans Regional County Municipality, in the administrative region of Capitale-Nationale.

The lower part of this small valley is served by Chemin Royale (route 368) which runs along the southeast shore of Île d'Orléans. Forestry is the main economic activity in the upper part of this valley; and agriculture in the middle and lower part.

The surface of the Dauphine River is generally frozen from the beginning of December until the end of March; however, safe circulation on the ice is generally done from mid-December to mid-March. The water level of the river varies with the seasons and the precipitation; the spring flood occurs in March or April.

== Geography ==
The Dauphine River originates from an agricultural stream, in Sainte-Famille-de-l'Île-d'Orléans. This source is located next to Route du Mitan, 2.6 kilometres (1.6 mi) southeast of the centre of the village of Sainte-Famille-de-l'Île-d'Orléans, at 3.0 kilometres (1.9 mi) southeast of chenal de l'Île d'Orléans and 5.4 kilometres (3.4 mi) northeast of the shore of Saint Lawrence River (chenal des Grands Voiliers).

From this source, the course of the Dauphine River descends on 11.3 kilometres (7.0 mi), with a drop of 107 metres (351 ft), according to the following segments:

- 2.7 kilometres (1.7 mi) towards the south-east by forming a mouth towards the south-west in the forest zone then enters Saint-Jean-de-l'Île-d'Orléans, until at a bend in the river located on the north side of the "Les Savanes" marshes;
- 5.8 kilometres (3.6 mi) north-east in an agricultural area, up to a bend in the river corresponding to the outlet of a stream (coming from the north);
- 2.8 kilometres (1.7 mi) towards the northeast by forming a hook towards the southeast to a bend of the river corresponding to the outlet of Le Grand Ruisseau, and by crossing the route 368, to its mouth.

The Dauphine River flows at the bottom of a small harbour in Saint-Jean-de-l'Île-d'Orléans, on the edge of Saint-François-de-l'Île-d'Orléans (northeast side). This harbour whose sandstone of about 0.26 kilometres (0.16 mi) at low tide, is attached to Chenal des Grands Voiliers whose width is 7.0 metres (23.0 ft) at this location. This channel is crossed by the St. Lawrence River. This harbour faces Île Madame and is located across the reef from Île Madame.

== History ==
In the 14th century, Mr. Poulin was a miller at the Delphine river mill (now "Dauphine river") on Île Saint-Laurent (or Île d'Orléans, today).

== Toponymy ==
According to the Commission de toponymie du Québec, the toponymic designation "Rivière Delphine" appeared in 1652 in the deed of concession of Argentenay's rear fief by Jean de Lauson to Louis d'Ailleboust in 1652. Geographical maps of Deshayes (1695), de Bellin (1744) attest to the same name.

In addition, the geographic map of the Île d'Orléans designed in 1689 by Robert de Villeneuve identifies this watercourse "Dauphine river". Later, this last toponymic form is essential in the use of the region.

A third toponymic designation "Bellefine River" will be used occasionally in the 19th century, notably by the historian Pierre-Georges Roy.

The historian Louis-Philippe Turcotte recounts in his work "Histoire de l'Île d'Orléans", published in 1867, that the name Dauphine was assigned to this watercourse "In honor of Madame la Dauphine de France, by Mr. Berthelot, owner of the Island and former secretary of the commandments of Madame la Dauphine."

The toponym "Rivière Dauphine" was formalized on December 5, 1968 at the Bank of Place Names of the Commission de toponymie du Québec.

== See also ==
- Capitale-Nationale, an administrative region
- L'Île-d'Orléans Regional County Municipality
- Île d'Orléans, an island
- Sainte-Famille-de-l'Île-d'Orléans
- Saint-Jean-de-l'Île-d'Orléans, a municipality
- Chenal des Grands Voiliers
- St. Lawrence River
- List of rivers of Quebec
