= Rivière de la Savane (île d'Orléans) =

- Location within Quebec

Location
- Country: Canada
- Province: Quebec
- Region: Capitale-Nationale
- MRC: L'Île-d'Orléans Regional County Municipality
- Municipality: Saint-François-de-l'Île-d'Orléans

Physical characteristics
- Source: Little lake
  - location: Saint-François-de-l'Île-d'Orléans
  - coordinates: 46°59′17″N 70°51′05″W
  - elevation: 76 m (249 ft)
- Mouth: Chenal des Grands Voiliers (Saint Lawrence River)
  - location: Saint-François-de-l'Île-d'Orléans
  - coordinates: 46°59′15″N 70°49′14″W
  - elevation: 4 m (13 ft)
- Length: 3.2 km (2.0 mi)

The Savane River flows in the municipality of Saint-François-de-l'Île-d'Orléans, in the L'Île-d'Orléans Regional County Municipality, in the administrative region of Capitale-Nationale, in the province of Quebec, in Canada.

The lower part of this small valley is served by Chemin Royale (route 368) which runs along the southeast shore of Île d'Orléans. Besides a small forest area crossed in the upper part, agriculture constitutes the main economic activity of this small valley.

The surface of the Dauphine River is generally frozen from the beginning of December until the end of March; however, safe circulation on the ice is generally done from mid-December to mid-March. The water level of the river varies with the seasons and the precipitation; the spring flood occurs in March or April.

== Geography ==
The Savannah river originates from a small agricultural lake (altitude: 76 metres (249 ft)), located between two hills, in Saint-François-de-l'Île-d'Orléans. This source is located 3.3 kilometres (2.1 mi) south-west of the village center of Saint-François-de-l'Île-d'Orléans, 3.4 kilometres (2.1 mi) south-west east of chenal de l'Île d'Orléans and 2.1 kilometres (1.3 mi) west of the shore of the Saint Lawrence River (Chenal des Grands Voiliers).

From this source, the course of the Savane river descends on 3.2 kilometres (2.0 mi), with a drop of 72 metres (236 ft), according to the following segments:

- 1.3 kilometres (0.81 mi) north-east, up to a bend in the river;
- 0.9 kilometres (0.56 mi) towards the east, then towards the northeast, up to a bend of the river corresponding to the discharge of a stream (coming from the northwest);
- 1.0 kilometre (0.62 mi) to the east passing near the Île d'Orléans Heliport and crossing the route 368, to its mouth.

The Savane river flows over a sandstone of a hundred metres at low tide, or on the west bank of the Chenal des Grands Voiliers whose width is 9.0 metres (29.5 ft) at this place. This mouth of the Savane river faces Île Madame which is 2.8 metres (9 ft 2 in) to the east. This channel is crossed by the St. Lawrence River. This mouth is located 1.7 metres (5 ft 7 in) south of the village centre of Saint-François-de-l'Île-d'Orléans.

== Toponymy ==
The toponym "Savannah river" originates from an area designated "Savannah" at the head of the river.

The toponym "Rivière de la Savane" was formalized on February 4, 1982 at the Place Names Bank of the Commission de toponymie du Québec.

== See also ==
- Capitale-Nationale, an administrative region
- L'Île-d'Orléans Regional County Municipality
- Île d'Orléans, an island
- Saint-François-de-l'Île-d'Orléans
- Chenal des Grands Voiliers
- St. Lawrence River
- List of rivers of Quebec
