= Chenal des Grands Voiliers =

Channel in L'Île-d'Orléans Regional County Municipality, Quebec, Canada

Chenal des Grands Voiliers Old name: "Chenal du Sud"
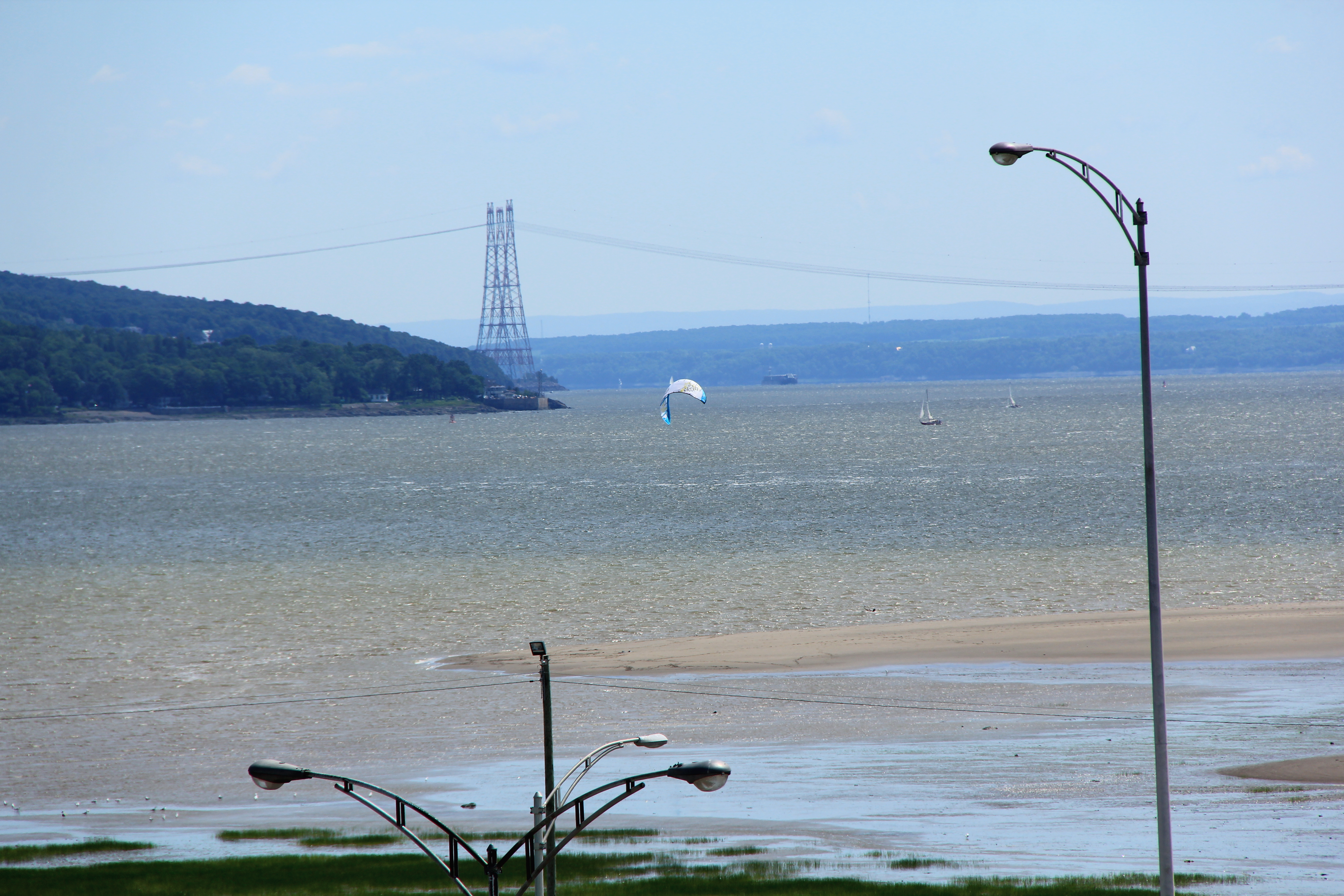

Location
- Country: Canada
- Province: Quebec
- Region: Capitale-Nationale
- Regional County Municipality: L'Île-d'Orléans Regional County Municipality and Bellechasse Regional County Municipality
- Municipality: Berthier-sur-Mer, Saint-Michel-de-Bellechasse, Lévis, Sainte-Pétronille, Saint-Laurent-de-l'Île-d'Orléans, Saint-Jean-de-l'Île-d'Orléans and Saint-François-de-l'Île-d'Orléans

Physical characteristics
- Source: St. Lawrence River
  - location: Sainte-Pétronille and Lévis
  - coordinates: 46°50′23″N 71°08′21″W
  - elevation: 4 m
- Mouth: St. Lawrence River
  - location: Saint-François-de-l'Île-d'Orléans and Berthier-sur-Mer
  - coordinates: 46°58′04″N 70°43′40″W
  - elevation: 4 m
- Length: 34 km (21 mi)

Basin features
- Tributaries
  - left: (upward from the mouth) Saint-Patrice creek, rivière du Moulin (île d'Orléans), Maheu River, Lafleur River, Dauphine River, rivière de la Savane (île d'Orléans).
  - right: (upward from the mouth) Corriveau creek, Bellechasse creek, rivière des Mères, Boyer River (Bellechasse), ruisseau de la Piscine, Beaumont creek, Labrecque creek, discharge Saint-Basile.

The Chenal des Grands Voiliers (French pronunciation: [ʃənal de ɡʁɑ̃ vwalje], channel of tall sailships) is a channel of the St. Lawrence River, between Île d'Orléans and the south shore of Quebec, in the province of Quebec, in Canada. On the southeast shore of Île d'Orléans, this channel successively wets the municipalities of Sainte-Pétronille, Saint-Laurent-de-l'Île-d'Orléans, Saint-Jean-de-l'Île-d'Orléans and Saint-François-de-l'Île-d'Orléans in L'Île-d'Orléans Regional County Municipality, in the administrative region of Capitale-Nationale. On the south shore of Quebec, the channel anchors the town of Lévis, Saint-Michel-de-Bellechasse and Berthier-sur-Mer in Bellechasse Regional County Municipality in the Chaudière-Appalaches region.

Oceanic vessels use this passage to go up the St. Lawrence River to the Great Lakes. During the history, this channel was the scene of many shipwrecks. It was a must in order to enter the heart of America, via the St. Lawrence River.

The channel is formed by Île d'Orléans (length: 33.1 kilometres (20.6 mi); width: 8.3 kilometres (5.2 mi)) which is bounded to the southeast by the St. Lawrence River and by the south shore of Quebec, between Lévis and Berthier-sur-Mer.

In winter, the channel is cleared of ice by federal icebreakers.

== Geography ==
The Île d'Orléans channel begins at the southwestern tip of Île d'Orléans, in the municipality of Sainte-Pétronille. Opposite, on the south shore of Quebec, the channel begins between Gilmour Cove and Pointe De La Martinière.

The width of the entrance to the channel is 1.8 kilometres (1.1 mi).

The course of the Île d'Orléans channel passes under the Hydro-Québec high-voltage lines, which span the river.

The mouth of the Île des Grands Voiliers channel is located at Île Madame (length: 2.6 kilometres (1.6 mi)) which is surrounded by sandstone at low tide. This island is located upstream from the height of the northeast point of Île d'Orléans. The width of the mouth of the channel is 9.2 kilometres (5.7 mi). The centre of this confluence is located at:

- 6.7 kilometres (4.2 mi) east of Île d'Orléans;
- 3.0 kilometres (1.9 mi) north-west of the point which marks the Anse Verte and the Anse de Berthier in Berthier-sur-Mer;
- 3.3 kilometres (2.1 mi) east of Île Madame;
- 39.4 kilometres (24.5 mi) northeast of the centre of Vieux-Québec.

== Toponymy ==
Formerly, this river passage was designated "Southern Channel". This current toponymic designation was awarded in April 1984 by the Commission de toponymie du Québec when the tall ships came to Quebec. This toponym commemorates the 450th anniversary of Jacques Cartier's first trip to the Gulf of St. Lawrence.

Les Grands Voiliers returned to Quebec and Lévis as part of the 2017 Rendez-vous.

The toponym "Chenal de l'Île d'Orléans" was formalized on April 5, 1984 at the Name Bank of the Commission de toponymie du Québec.

== See also ==
- Capitale-Nationale, an administrative region
- L'Île-d'Orléans Regional County Municipality
- Île d'Orléans, an island
- St. Lawrence River
- List of rivers of Quebec
