= Rivière Pot au Beurre (île d'Orléans) =

Location
- Country: Canada
- Province: Quebec
- Region: Capitale-Nationale
- MRC: L'Île-d'Orléans Regional County Municipality
- Municipality: Saint-Pierre-de-l'Île-d'Orléans, Sainte-Famille-de-l'Île-d'Orléans

Physical characteristics
- Source: Forested stream near a marsh area
  - location: Sainte-Famille-de-l'Île-d'Orléans
  - coordinates: 46°56′06″N 70°59′41″W
  - elevation: 107 m (351 ft)
- Mouth: Chenal de l'Île d'Orléans (Saint Lawrence River)
  - location: Saint-Pierre-de-l'Île-d'Orléans
  - coordinates: 46°55′53″N 71°01′44″W
  - elevation: 4 m (13 ft)
- Length: 3.5 km (2.2 mi)

The Pot au Beurre River flows through the municipalities of Sainte-Famille-de-l'Île-d'Orléans and Saint-Pierre-de-l'Île-d'Orléans, in the L'Île-d'Orléans Regional County Municipality, in the administrative region of Capitale-Nationale, in the province from Quebec, to Canada.

The lower part of this small valley is served by Chemin Royale (route 368) which runs along the northwest shore of Île d'Orléans. Forestry is the main economic activity in the upper part of this valley; and agriculture in the middle and lower part.

The surface of the Pot au Beurre River is generally frozen from the beginning of December until the end of March, except the rapids; however, safe circulation on the ice is generally done from mid-December to mid-March. The water level of the river varies with the seasons and the precipitation; the spring flood occurs in March or April.

== Geography ==
The Pot au Beurre River originates from a forest stream on the northwest side of a marsh area, in the southwest part of the municipality of Sainte-Famille-de-l'Île-d'Orléans. This source is located 4.9 kilometres (3.0 mi) south-west of the village center of Sainte-Famille-de-l'Île-d'Orléans, 1.5 kilometres (0.93 mi) to the west of the chenal de l'Île d'Orléans and 5.4 kilometres (3.4 mi) north-west of the shore of the chenal des Grands Voiliers (St. Lawrence River).

From this source, the course of the Pot au Beurre river descends on 3.5 kilometres (2.2 mi), with a drop of 103 metres (338 ft), according to the following segments:

- 2.5 kilometres (1.6 mi) towards the southwest relatively in a straight line generally in the forest zone in parallel with the Royal road (which is located in the northwest), entering Saint-Pierre-de-l'Île-d'Orléans at the end of the segment, up to a bend in the river corresponding to a stream (coming from the south-west);
- 1.0 kilometre (0.62 mi) north-west generally in the agricultural zone, crossing the route 368, until its mouth. Note: this segment of river delimits Saint-Pierre-de-l'Île-d'Orléans (southwest side) and Sainte-Famille-de-l'Île-d'Orléans (northeast side).

The Pot au Beurre river flows into the channel of Île d'Orléans, the width of which is 1.95 metres (6 ft 5 in) at this location and whose sandstone stretches for approximately 0.5 kilometres (0.31 mi) at low tide. This mouth faces the mouth of the Valin River, in Château-Richer. This channel is attached to the St. Lawrence River.

== Toponymy ==
The toponym “Pot au Beurre River” appears in a 1722 plan delimiting the parish of Sainte-Famille. The expression "Pot au Beurre" has also been used in toponymy to designate another small river in the municipality of Yamaska, which flows into the St. Lawrence River. In the past, locals kept perishable food such as butter, cheese, meat and milk in containers immersed in cold water. A river or lake pit or well allowed food to be kept cool.

The toponym “Rivière Pot au Beurre” was formalized on August 8, 1977 at the Bank of Place Names of the Commission de toponymie du Québec.

== See also ==
- L'Île-d'Orléans Regional County Municipality
- Île d'Orléans, an island
- Saint-Pierre-de-l'Île-d'Orléans, a municipality
- Sainte-Famille-de-l'Île-d'Orléans, a municipality
- Capitale-Nationale, an administrative region
- Chenal de l'Île d'Orléans
- St. Lawrence River
- List of rivers of Quebec
