= Maheu River =

Location
- Country: Canada
- Province: Quebec
- Region: Capitale-Nationale
- MRC: L'Île-d'Orléans Regional County Municipality
- Municipality: Saint-Pierre-de-l'Île-d'Orléans, Saint-Laurent-de-l'Île-d'Orléans and Saint-Jean-de-l'Île-d'Orléans

Physical characteristics
- Source: Little lake
  - location: Saint-Pierre-de-l'Île-d'Orléans
  - coordinates: 46°52′51″N 71°04′02″W
  - elevation: 136 m (446 ft)
- Mouth: Saint Lawrence River
  - location: Saint-Jean-de-l'Île-d'Orléans
  - coordinates: 46°53′44″N 70°57′22″W
  - elevation: 4 m (13 ft)
- Length: 11.8 km (7.3 mi)

The Maheu River flows through the municipalities of Saint-Pierre-de-l'Île-d'Orléans, Saint-Laurent-de-l'Île-d'Orléans and Saint-Jean-de-l'Île-d'Orléans, in the L'Île-d'Orléans Regional County Municipality, in the administrative region of Capitale-Nationale, in the province of Quebec, in Canada.

The lower part of this small valley is served by Chemin Royale (route 368) which runs along the southeast shore of Île d'Orléans. Forestry is the main economic activity in the upper part of this valley; and agriculture in the lower part.

The surface of the Maheu River is generally frozen from the beginning of December until the end of March; however, safe circulation on the ice is generally done from mid-December to mid-March. The water level of the river varies with the seasons and the precipitation; the spring flood occurs in March or April.

== Geography ==
The Maheu river originates in a forest area at the mouth of a very small unidentified lake (length: less than a hundred meters; altitude: 136 metres (446 ft)), in Saint-Pierre-de-l'Île-d'Orléans. This source is located a hundred meters southwest of the Route des Prêtres, 1.7 kilometres (1.1 mi) southeast of the village centre of Saint-Pierre-de-l'Île-d'Orléans, 3.1 kilometres (1.9 mi) southeast of the Chenal de l'Île d'Orléans and 2.7 kilometres (1.7 mi) northeast of the shore of St. Lawrence River (chenal des Grands Voiliers).

From this source, the course of the Maheu river descends on 11.8 kilometres (7.3 mi), with a drop of 132 metres (433 ft), according to the following segments:

- 5.9 kilometres (3.7 mi) north-east in a forest zone in Saint-Pierre-de-l'Île-d'Orléans, first by crossing the Route des Prêtres, by collecting a stream (coming from the southwest), to a bend in the river corresponding to a stream (coming from the north);
- 4.0 kilometres (2.5 mi) first towards the east in the forest zone by entering Saint-Laurent-de-l'Île-d'Orléans, towards the east by entering the agricultural zone, by bending to the north and collecting a stream (coming from the south) before entering Saint-Jean-de-l'Île-d'Orléans, up to a bend in the river;
- 1.9 kilometres (1.2 mi) towards the south-east in the agricultural zone by forming a loop towards the east, then crossing a series of rapids until its mouth.

The Maheu river flows at the bottom of the Rade Maheu in Saint-Jean-de-l'Île-d'Orléans, that is to the limit of Saint-Jean-de-l'Île-d'Orléans (northeast side) and Saint-Laurent-de-l'Île-d'Orléans (southwest side). This harbour is spanned a hundred meters further by the route 368 bridge. This harbour whose sandstone of about 0.24 kilometres (0.15 mi) at low tide, is attached to Chenal des Grands Voiliers whose width is 3.2 metres (10 ft) at this location and is crossed by the St. Lawrence River.

== Toponymy ==
The toponymic designation "river Maheu" evokes the memory of René Maheu, pilot on the river, whose concession was granted to him in 1651. Originally from Paris, Maheu was nephew of the first pioneer of New France, Louis Hébert. René Maheu was present in Acadia in 1610 and 1612; a first concession in New France was granted to him in 1637. René Maheu married May 23, 1648 in La Rochelle, in France, to Marguerite Courivault (Corriveau). Following the death in 1661 of the pioneer Maheu, his fiefdom was passed on to his son Jean-Paul Maheu. Marguerite Corriveau was appointed tutor of the minor children of René Maheu (Maheust).

According to a plan of 1659, the Maheu fief included the watercourse designated "Saint-Louis river" on Île d'Orléans. Formerly, this river drained a swamp locally designated "Lac à Maheu". In 1689, the lake at Maheu and the river of the same name appear on a geographical plan. Due to the digging of streams, this marsh has dried up throughout history, and this toponym has disappeared from geographic maps. Thus, the name of the owner of the fief has supplanted that of "Saint-Louis river" in popular usage.

The toponym "Rivière Maheu" was formalized on December 5, 1968 at the Place Names Bank of the Commission de toponymie du Québec.

== See also ==
- Capitale-Nationale
- Chenal des Grands Voiliers
- Île d'Orléans
- L'Île-d'Orléans Regional County Municipality
- List of rivers of Quebec
- Saint-Jean-de-l'Île-d'Orléans
- Saint-Laurent-de-l'Île-d'Orléans
- Saint-Pierre-de-l'Île-d'Orléans
- St. Lawrence River
