= Île d'Orléans =

Island in the Saint Lawrence River, Quebec, Canada

Island of Orleans
Native name: Île d'Orléans
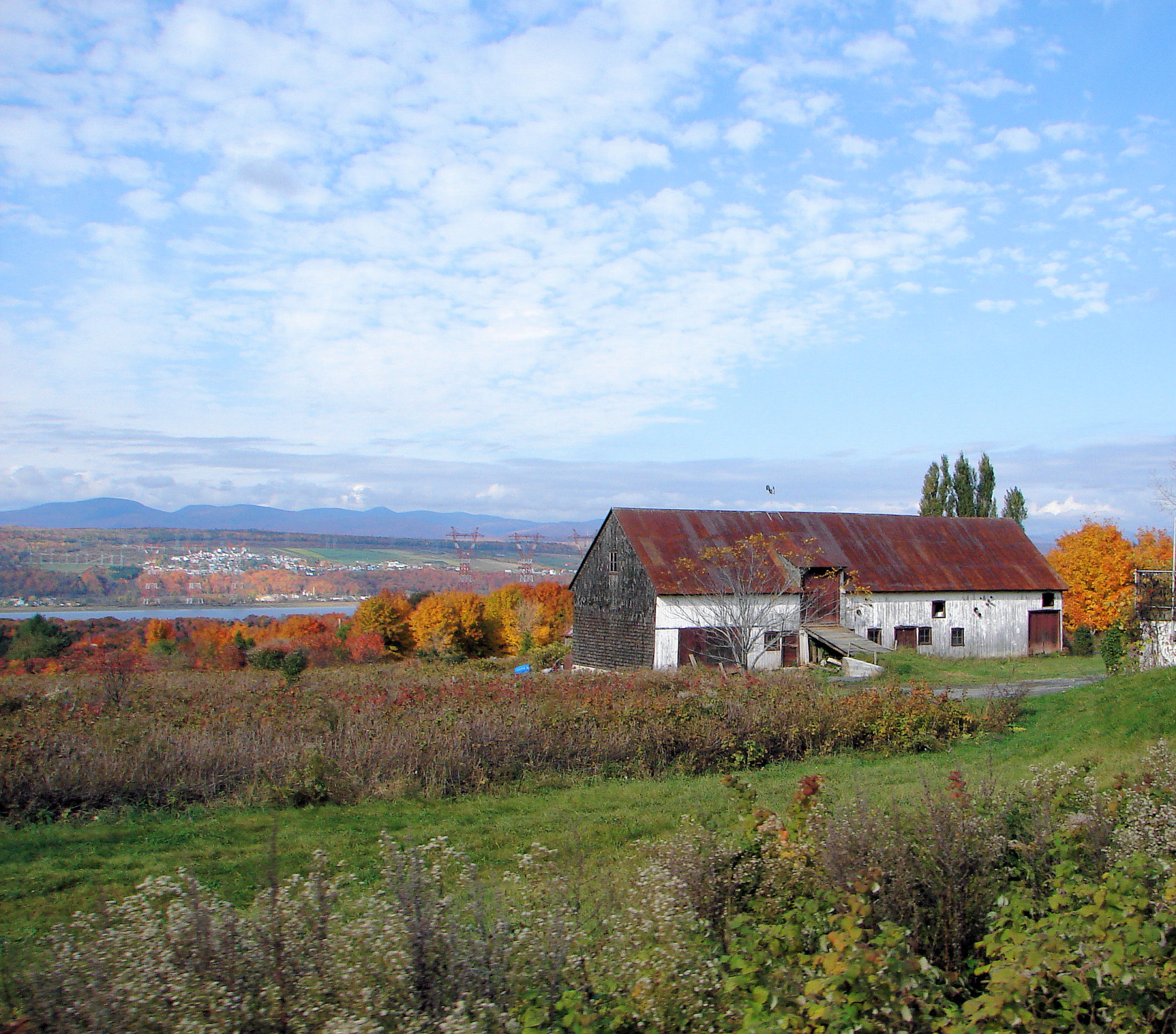
- Île d'Orléans' pastoral character is well preserved

- Location within Central Quebec Location within Canada

Geography
- Coordinates: 46°56′09″N 70°56′50″W
- Adjacent to: Saint Lawrence River
- Area: 192.85 km^{2} (74.46 sq mi)
- Length: 34 km (21.1 mi)
- Width: 8 km (5 mi)
- Highest elevation: 150 m (490 ft)

Administration
- Canada
- Province: Quebec
- Regional county: L'Île-d'Orléans

Demographics
- Population: 7,082 (2016)
- Pop. density: 37/km^{2} (96/sq mi)

Île d'Orléans (French pronunciation: [il dɔʁleɑ̃]; English: Island of Orleans) is an island located in the Saint Lawrence River about 5 kilometres (3.1 mi) east of downtown Quebec City, Quebec, Canada. It was one of the first parts of the province to be colonized by the French, and a large percentage of French Canadians can trace ancestry to early residents of the island. The island has been described as the "microcosm of traditional Quebec and as the birthplace of francophones in North America."

It has about 7,000 inhabitants, spread over six villages.

The island is accessible from the mainland via the Île d'Orléans Bridge from Beauport. Route 368 is the sole provincial route on the island, which crosses the bridge and circles the perimeter of the island. At the village of Sainte-Pétronille toward the western end of the island, a viewpoint overlooks the impressive Chute Montmorency (Montmorency Falls), as well as a panorama of the St. Lawrence River and Quebec City.

== Geography ==
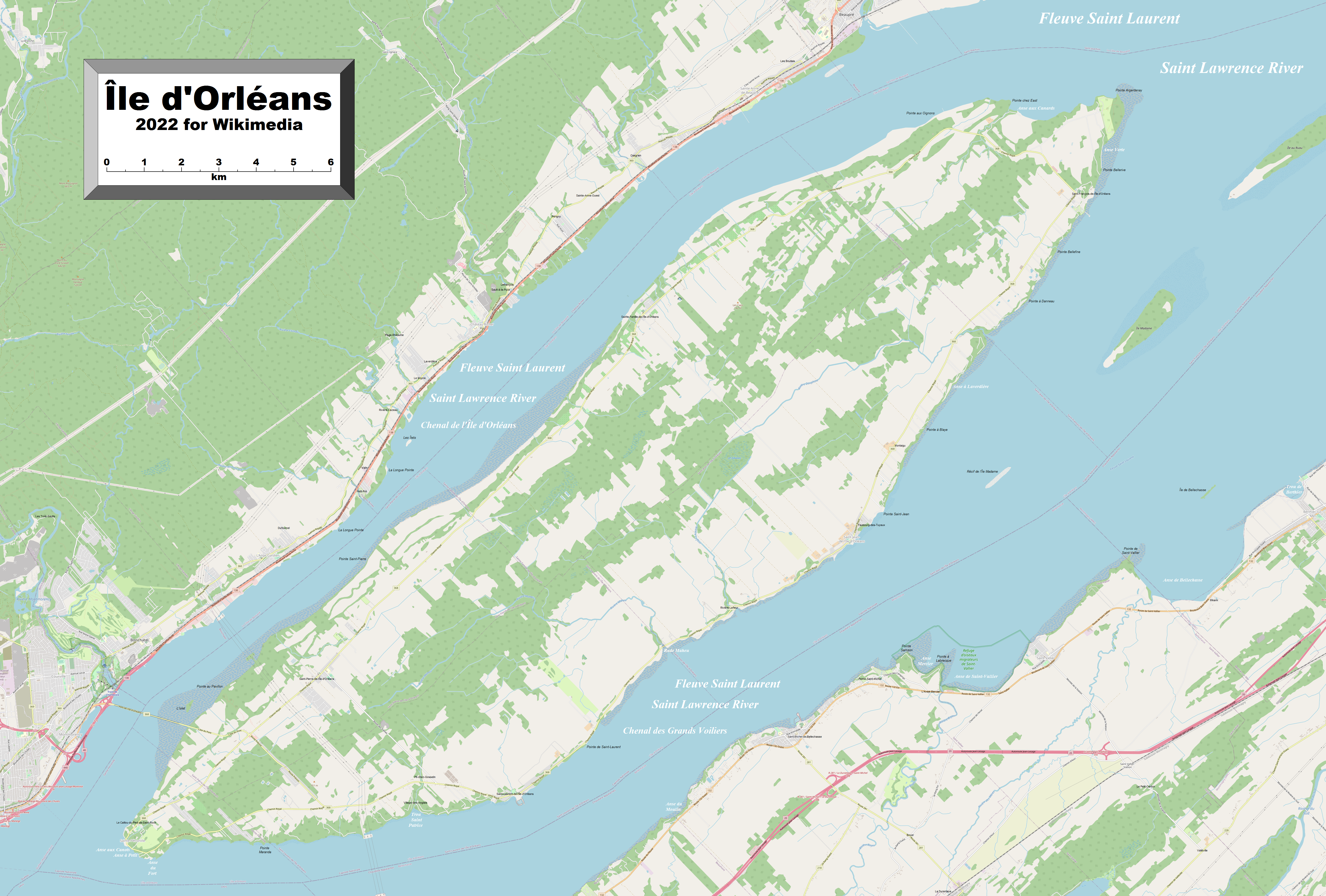
Detailed map of Île d'Orléans

The Island of Orleans is situated between the Laurentian Plateau or Canadian Shield to the north and the Appalachian Mountains to the south. Its north-eastern point marks of the St Lawrence river middle estuary, where the fresh water begins to mix with salt water.

The island is separated from the mainland by two channels; to the north-west is the Île d'Orléans Channel and to the south-east is the Grands Voiliers Channel.

Of irregular form with jagged coves and capes, the Island of Orleans is 34 kilometres (21 mi) long and 8 kilometres (5.0 mi) wide at the widest point. It is 75 kilometres (47 mi) in circumference, with a total surface area of 190 square kilometres (73 sq mi). It has a hilly relief, small valleys, and gradual crests that reach a maximum height of about 150 metres (490 ft) at Sainte-Pétronille and Saint-Laurent in the south.

The main streams of Île d'Orléans are:

- Chenal des Grands Voiliers (SE side of the island)
- Chenal de l'Île d'Orléans (NW side of the island)
- Rivière Dauphine (Saint-Jean)
- Rivière Lafleur (Saint-Jean)
- Rivière Maheu (Saint-Laurent)
- Ruisseau du Moulin (Saint-François)
- Rivière du Moulin (Saint-Laurent)
- Rivière du Moulin (Saint-Pierre)
- Rivière Pot au Beurre (Sainte-Famille)
- Rivière de la Savane

Administratively, the island is within Quebec's Capitale-Nationale region, and constitutes the L'Île-d'Orléans Regional County Municipality. It is further subdivided in the municipalities of:

- Sainte-Famille-de-l'Île-d'Orléans
- Saint-François-de-l'Île-d'Orléans
- Saint-Jean-de-l'Île-d'Orléans
- Saint-Laurent-de-l'Île-d'Orléans
- Sainte-Pétronille
- Saint-Pierre-de-l'Île-d'Orléans

The entire island is part of the Montmorency—Charlevoix—Haute-Côte-Nord federal electoral riding, and the Charlevoix–Côte-de-Beaupré provincial electoral riding.

== History ==
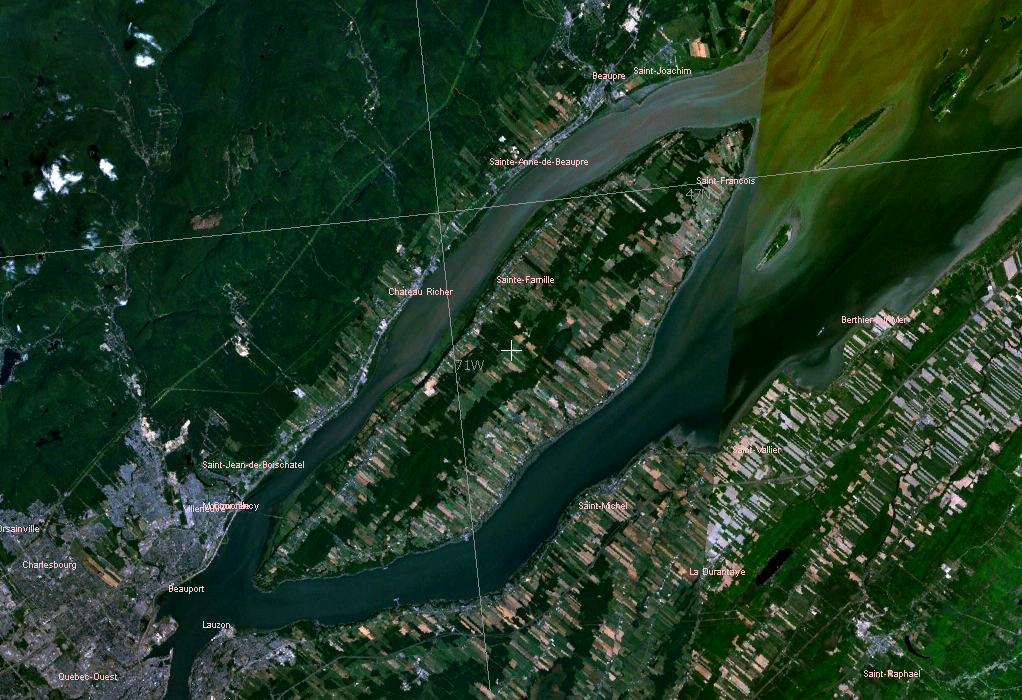
Satellite image of Île d'Orléans in the Saint Lawrence River

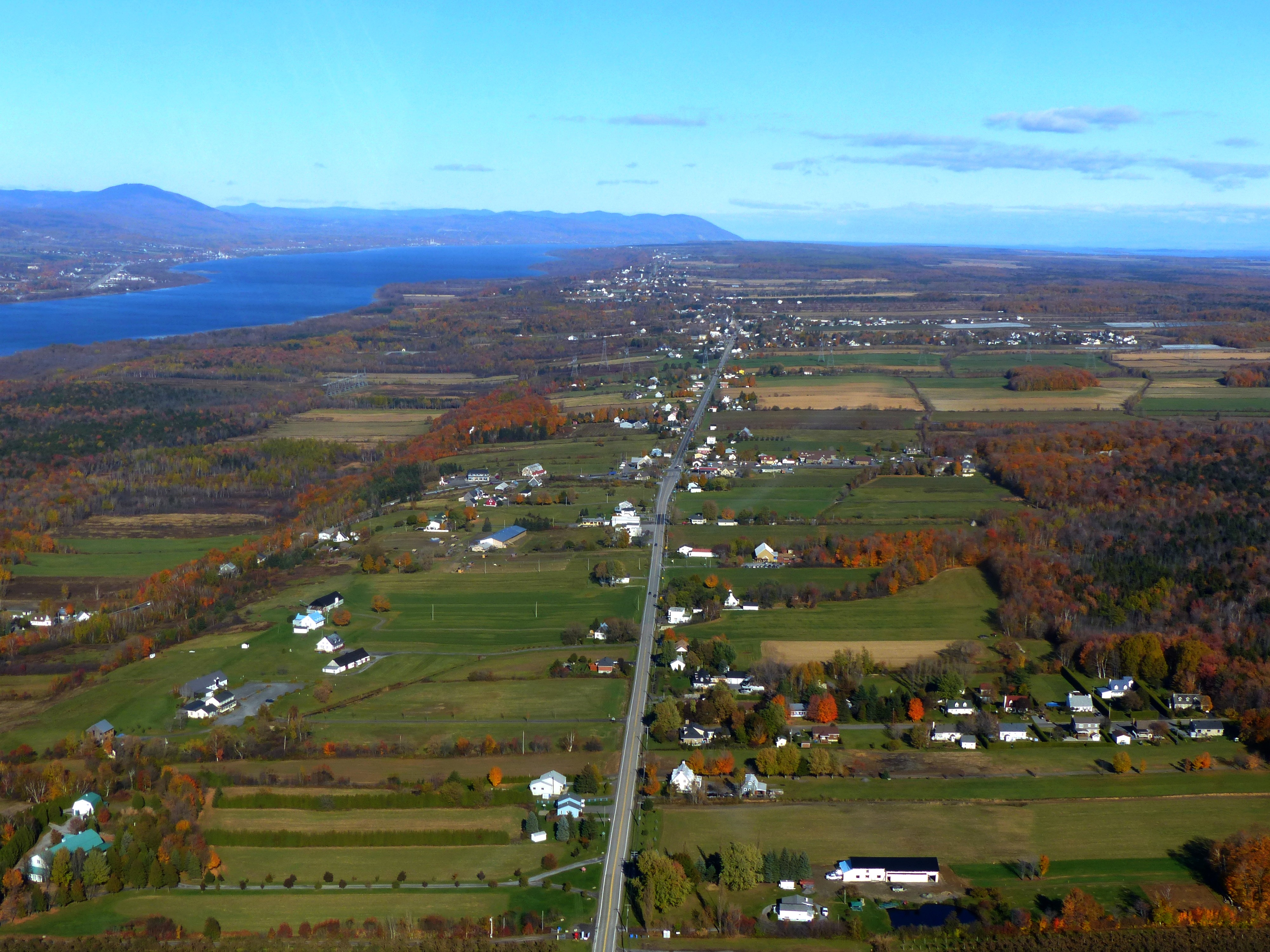
Lots of land in Saint-Pierre-de-l'Île-d'Orléans

The island had long been inhabited by Indigenous peoples. The Hurons called it Minigo (meaning "Enchantress") because of its charm. The French explorer Jacques Cartier first set foot on the island in 1535 near the present-day village of Saint-François. And called it Île de Bascuz (from Bacchus) because of the abundance of wild grapes growing on the island. Officials later changed the name to Île d'Orléans in honour of the second son of King Francis I, who became Henri II, Duke of Orléans. The island was also known as Grande Île, Sainte-Marie, and Saint-Laurent for certain periods in the 17th and the 18th centuries.

Early French settlers, mostly from Normandy and other provinces in northwestern France, were attracted to the island because of its fertile soil. They colonized it according to the seigneurial system of New France, which is still evident in its layout by featuring residences close together with outlying long and narrow fields and a common. In 1661, the first parish of Sainte-Famille was founded, followed by another four parishes in 1679 and 1680. By 1685, there were 1205 mostly French inhabitants and 917 livestock.

In 1744, colonists completed the 67 kilometres (42 mi) Chemin Royal (Royal Road), which encircles the entire island. Jean Mauvide, a surgeon for the King of France, built the Manoir Mauvide-Genest in 1734 as his residence. In 1759, it was occupied by British General James Wolfe when his forces occupied the island shortly before the Battle of the Plains of Abraham during the Seven Years' War in which Britain was victorious.

In the 19th and early 20th century, several boatbuilding yards operated on the island, especially in Saint-Laurent-de-l'Île-d'Orléans. Together with the thriving fishing industry of that era, they gave the island a maritime character.

In 1935 the Pont de l'Île was completed, and the bridge brought much more traffic. However, the island has maintained its pastoral image and historic character, with more than 600 buildings classified or recognized as heritage property. In 1990, the entire island was designated a National Historic Site of Canada.

Today, the island is a mix of suburban communities and farms and is a popular destination for day trippers and bicyclists.

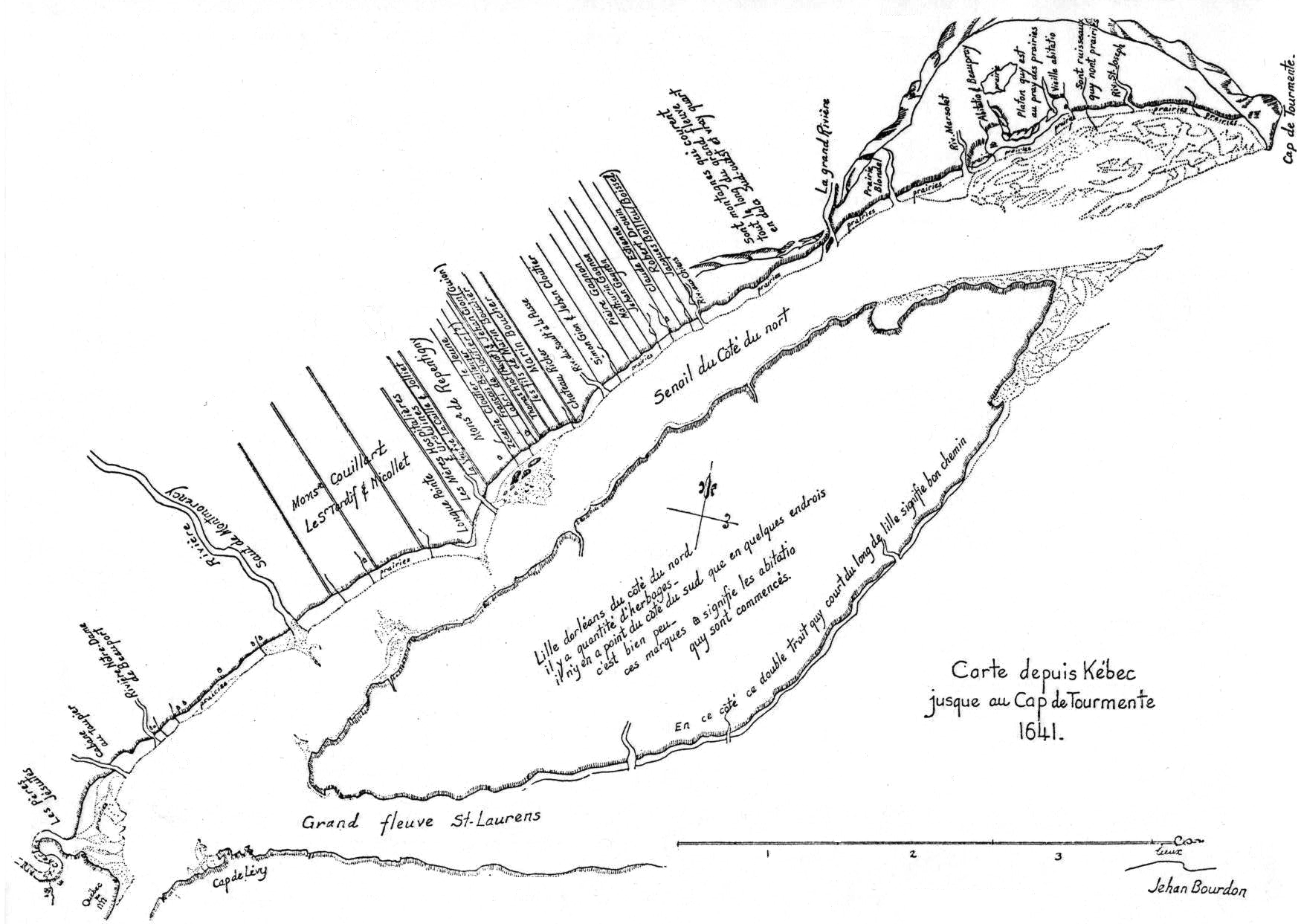
Map of Beaupré and Île d'Orléans, drawn in 1641 by Jean Bourdon

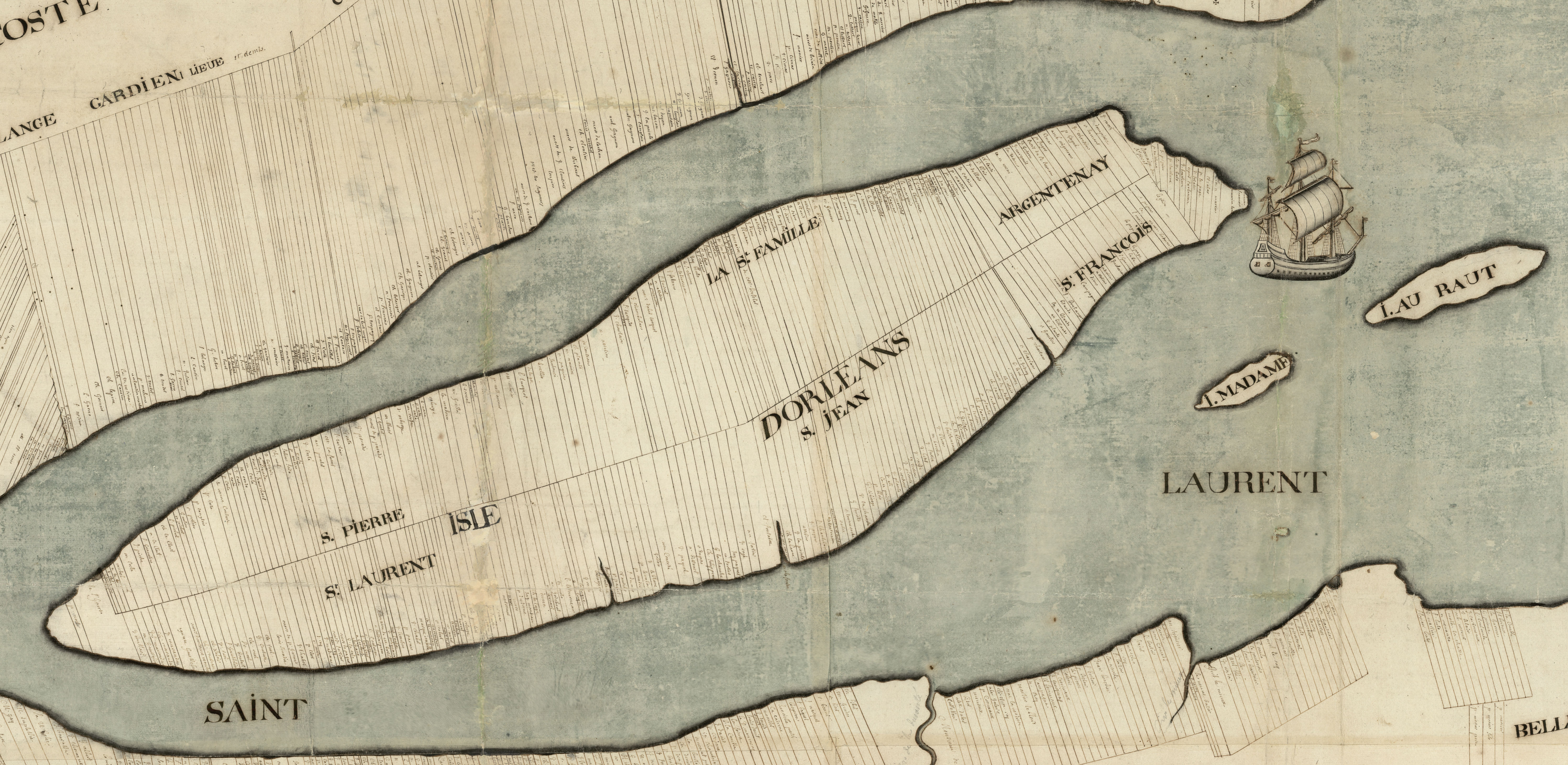
Map of the government of Quebec drawn in 1709 by Gédéon de Catalogne

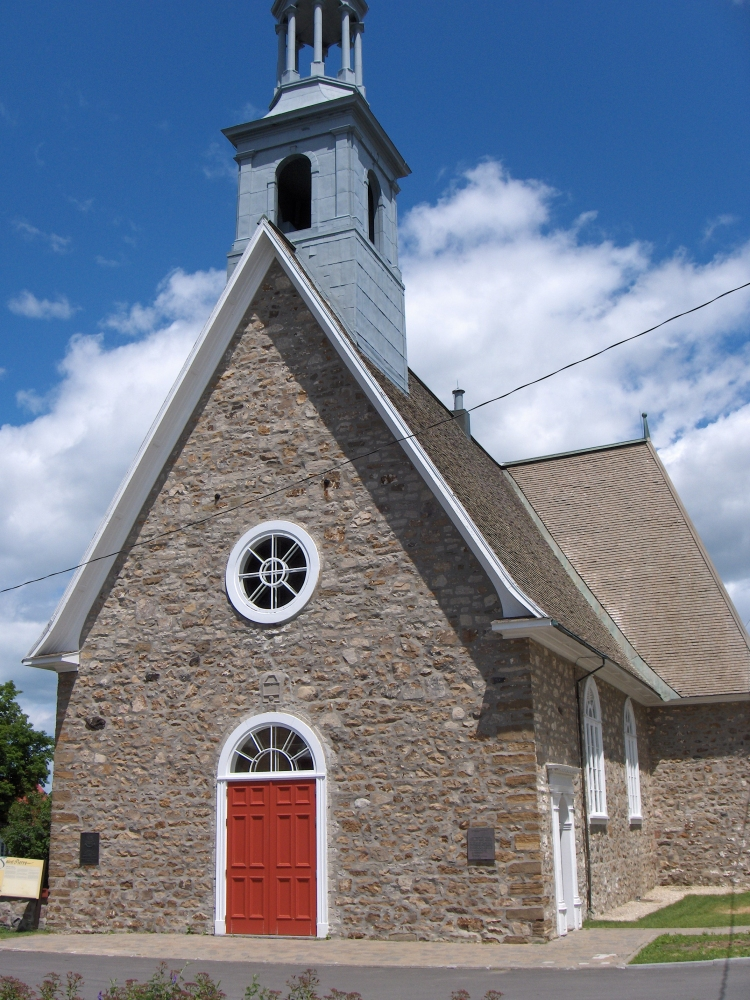
Saint-Pierre church (1717)

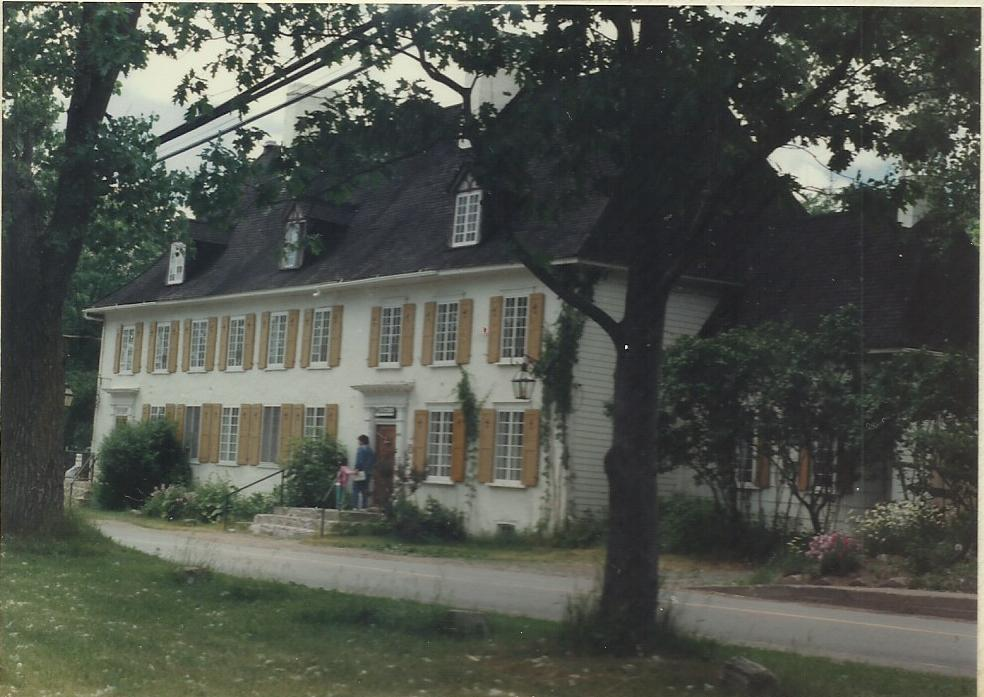
Manoir Mauvide-Genest

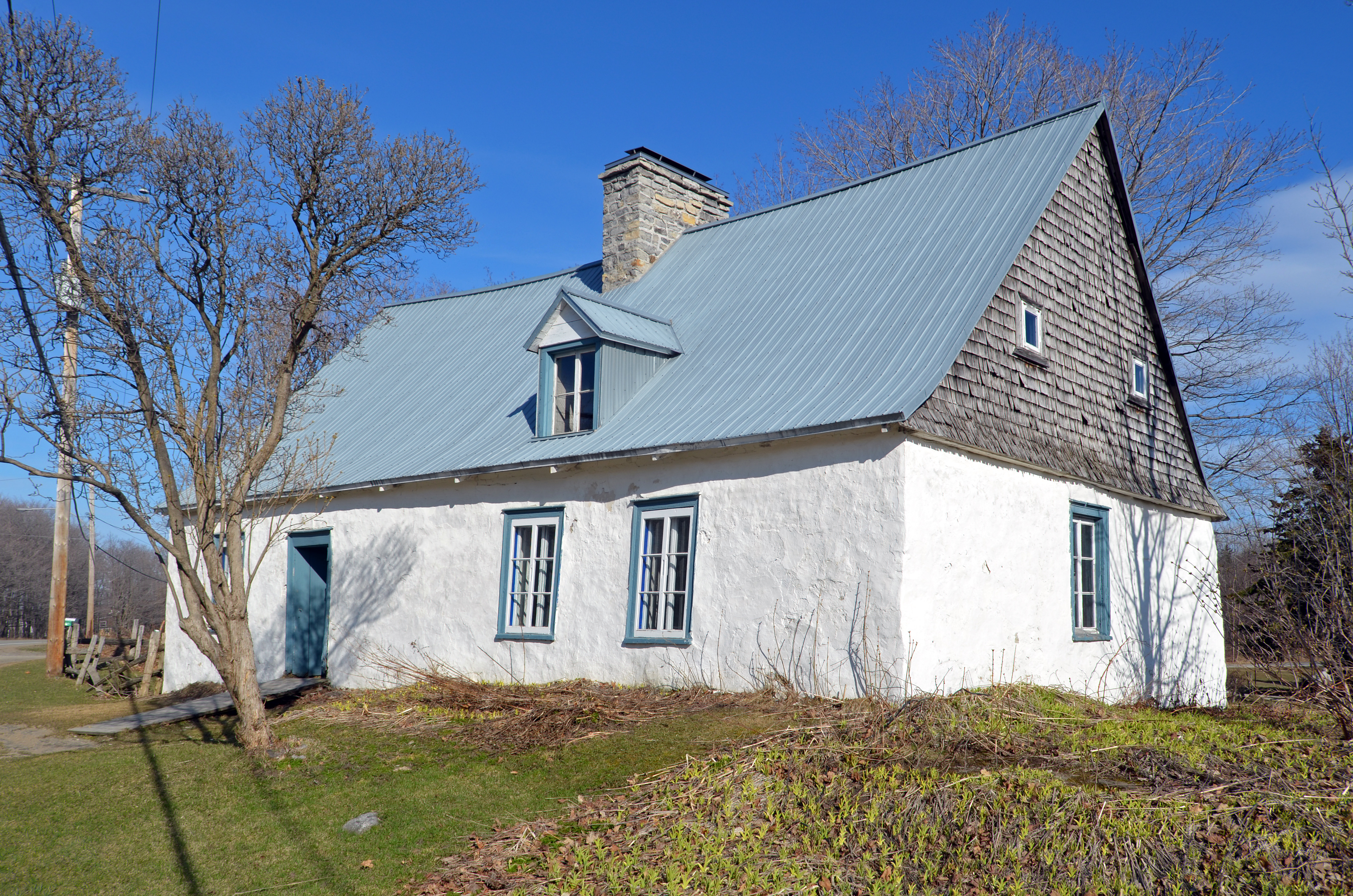
Maison Drouin in Sainte-Famille

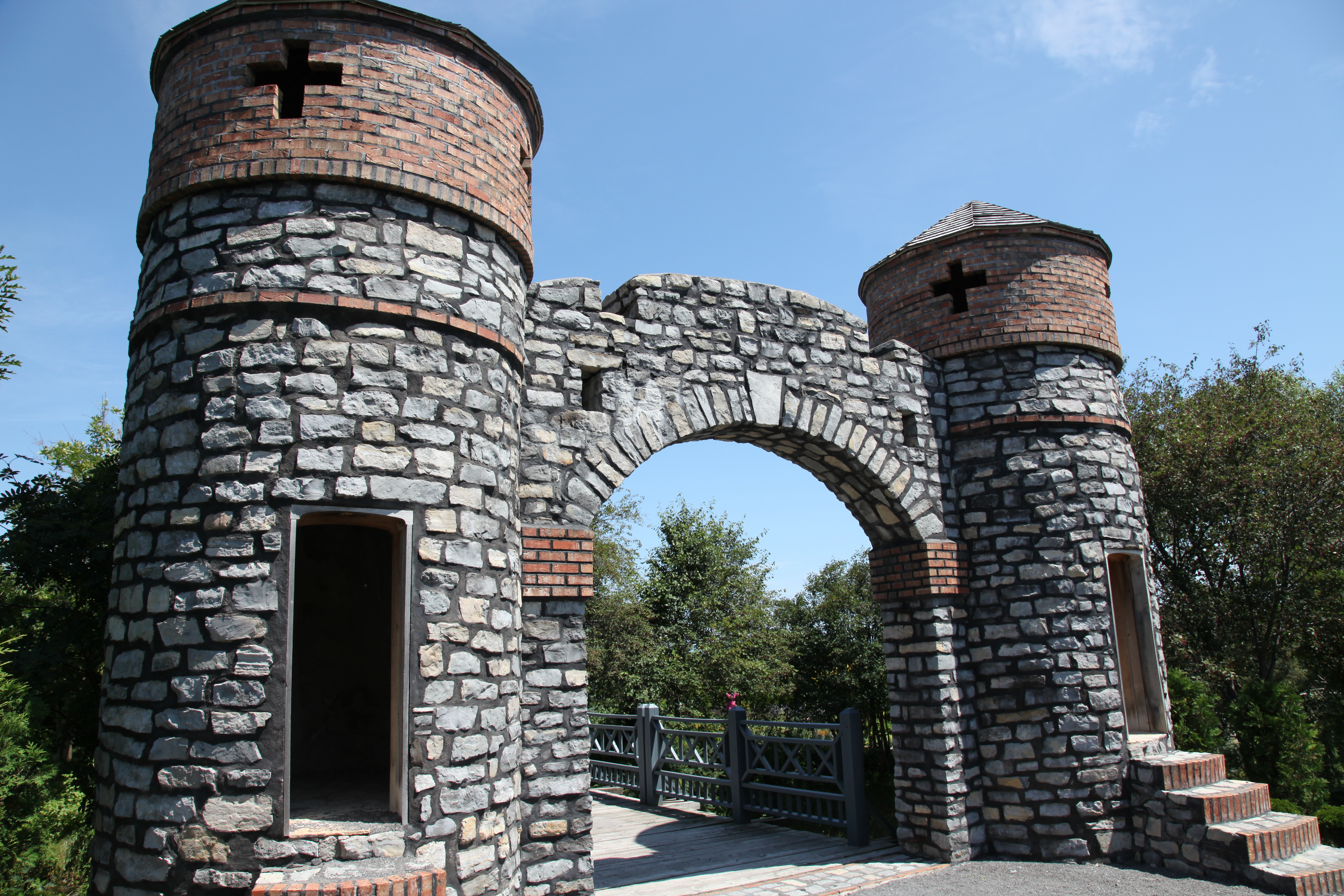
Mock-up door of make-believe l'Île-d'Orléans seigneurie

== Economy ==
Since the days of the first French settlers, agriculture has been the main economic activity. Potatoes, strawberries, apples, blueberries, raspberries and maple syrup is produced. There is also viticulture and cheese production. The island, known as the "Garden of Quebec", is still an essentially rural place famous locally for its produce, especially strawberries, apples, potatoes and wineries. Sugar maple stands produce maple syrup and other products.

While the old trades of fishing and boat building have been abandoned, the island's rich cultural heritage and pastoral scenery has led to a flourishing tourism industry. It attracts more than 600,000 visitors each year. Numerous bed-and-breakfast inns, regional cuisine restaurants, roadside fruit stands, art galleries and craft shops also attract visitors:

- Sainte-Famille-de-l'Île-d'Orléans the church of the Sainte-Famille from 1743 and the interpretation centers Maison de nos Aïeux and Maison Drouin;
- Saint-François-de-l'Île-d'Orléans the observation tower, the beach and the chocolate factory on Île d'Orléans;
- Saint-Jean-de-l'Île-d'Orléans the café “La Midinette” (formerly “La Boulange”), the Catholic church, the promenade on the shore of the St. Lawrence and the Mauvide-Genest Manor (National Historic Site of the Canada);
- Saint-Laurent-de-l'Île-d'Orléans the "La Chalouperie" museum at the maritime park and the Île d'Orléans marina;
- Sainte-Pétronille the island's chocolate factory and the painter's house Horatio Walker;
- Saint-Pierre-de-l'Île-d'Orléans the Félix Leclerc space and the Bellevue with the giant sculpture of Félix Leclerc.

Also for years there has been a strong movement of the inhabitants of city of Quebec, who own second homes around the periphery of the island of Orleans.

== Notable people ==
Félix Leclerc is buried in Saint-Pierre. There is the Espace Félix Leclerc, today a museum and performance hall, in his honour.

== In art and culture ==
Several chansonniers have made reference to Île d'Orléans in their songs, in particular:

- Yves Duteil refers to the island in his song La langue de chez nous (Our language).
- Félix Leclerc will make a song of it : Le Tour de l'île (The Island Tour).
- Jean-Pierre Ferland refers to the island in Chanson pour Félix (Song for Félix)
- Sylvain Lelièvre refers to the island in his song Le fleuve (The river)
- Monique Leyrac refers to the island in her song La fille de l'île (The Island Girl)
- Tire le Coyote refers to the island in his song Calfeutrer les failles (Caulk faults)

== Gallery ==
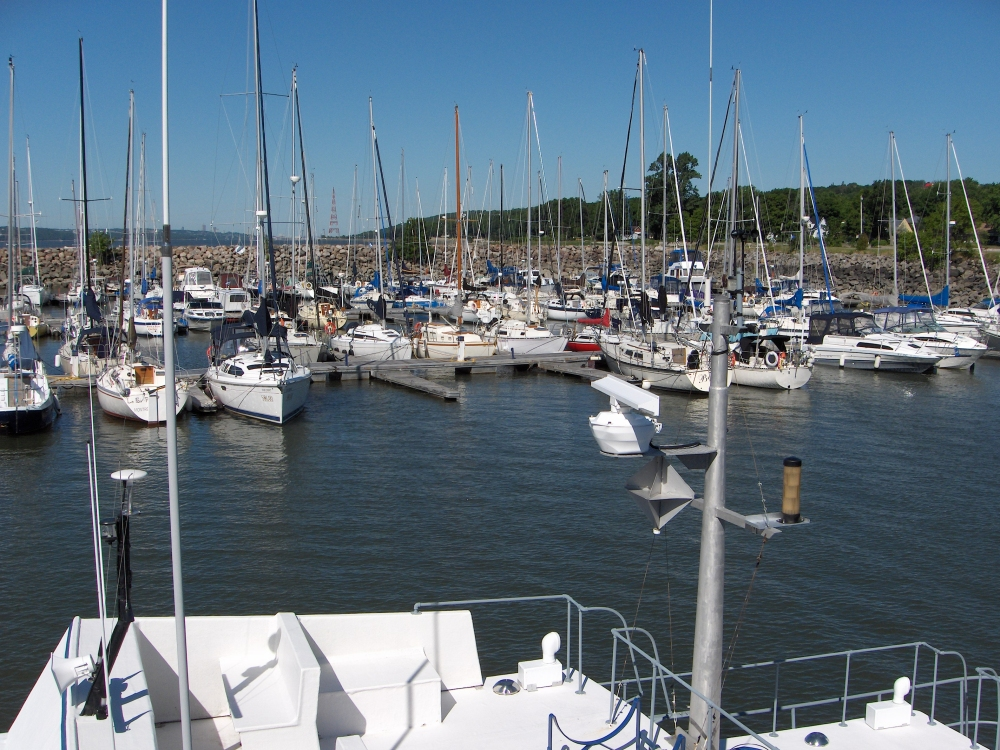
Île d'Orléans Marina

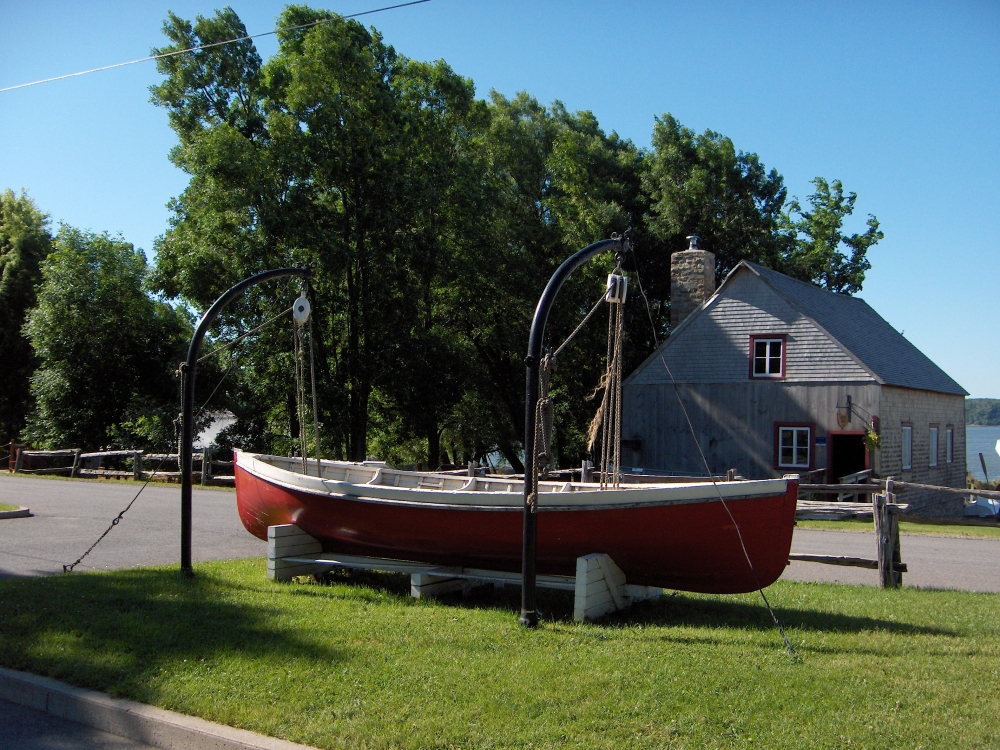
Museum La Chalouperie at "Parc maritime de Saint-Laurent" (English: Saint-Laurent Maritime Park)

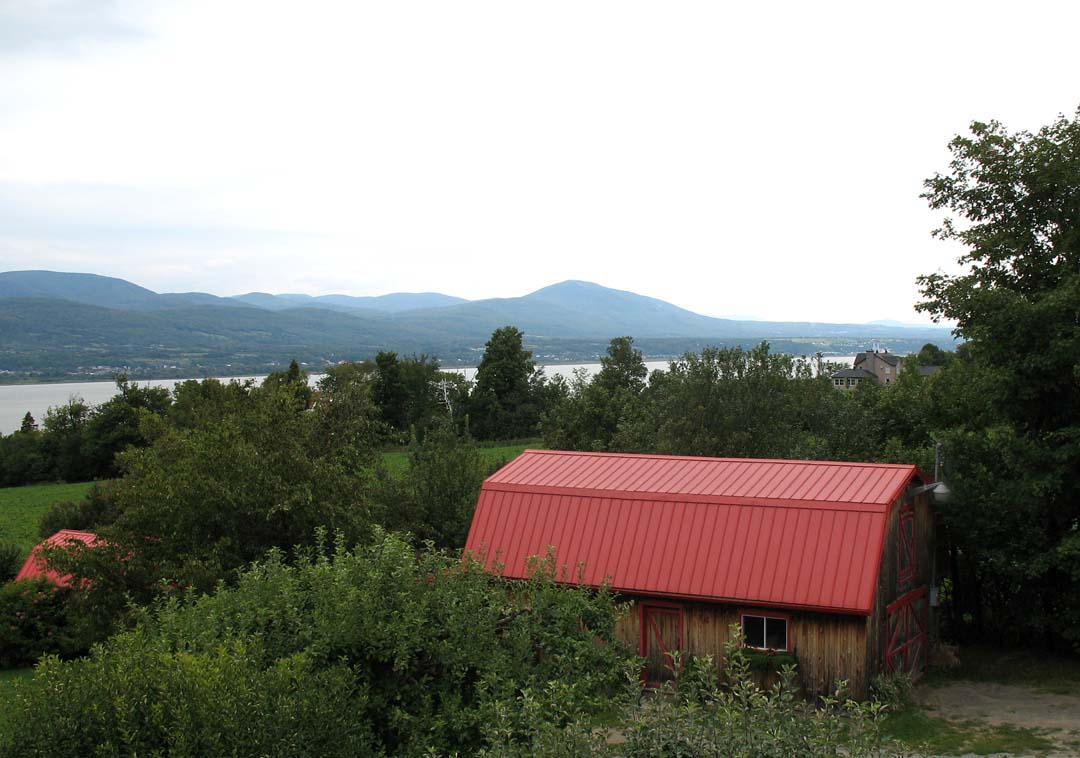
View of the north shore of the St. Lawrence River

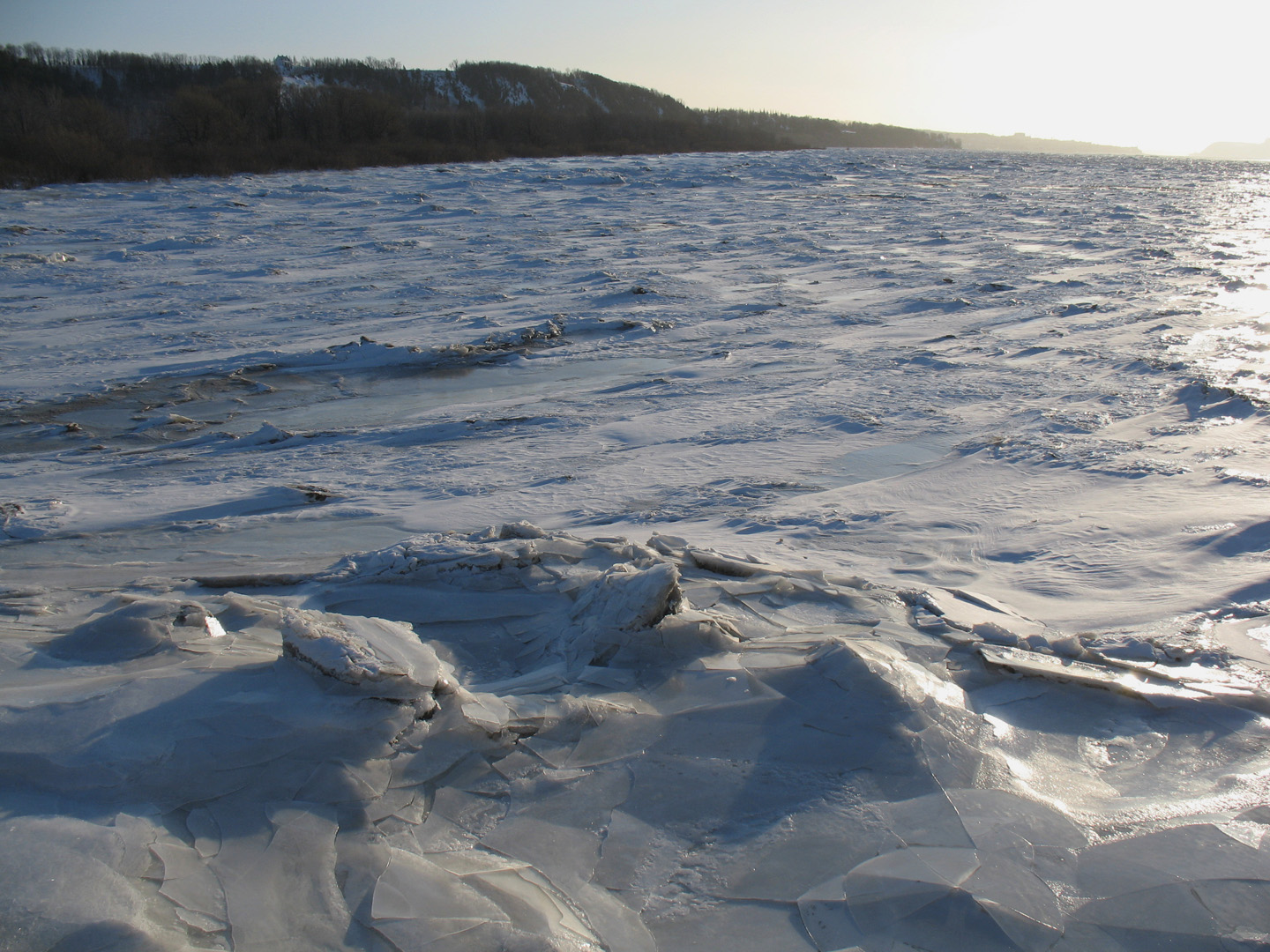
The frozen St. Lawrence River at the Île d'Orléans bridge

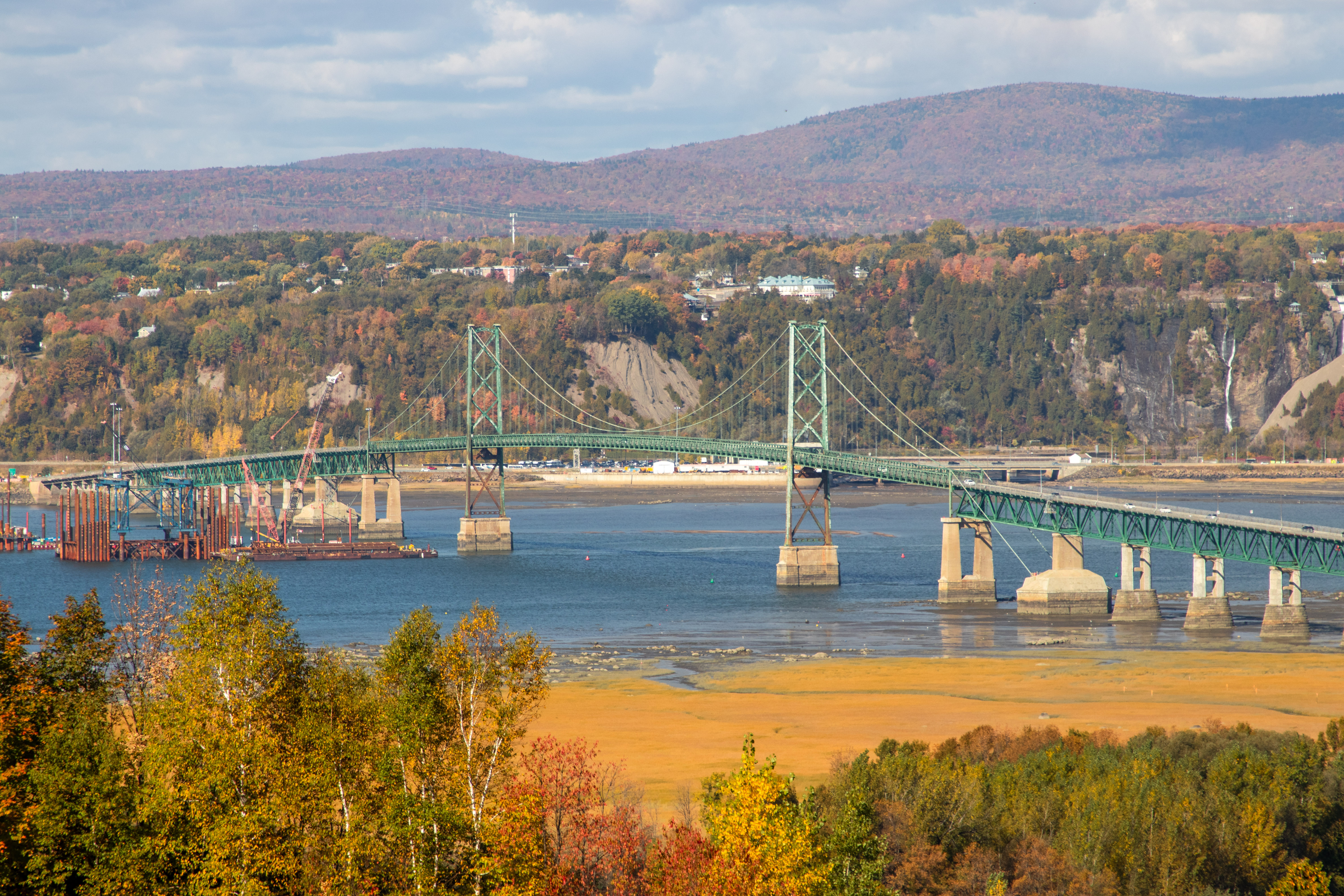
Île d'Orléans Bridge, viewed from Saint-Pierre

== See also ==
- Geography of Quebec
- List of islands of Quebec
- Maison Drouin
- Île aux Oeufs
