= Saint-Laurent-de-l'Île-d'Orléans =

- Municipality
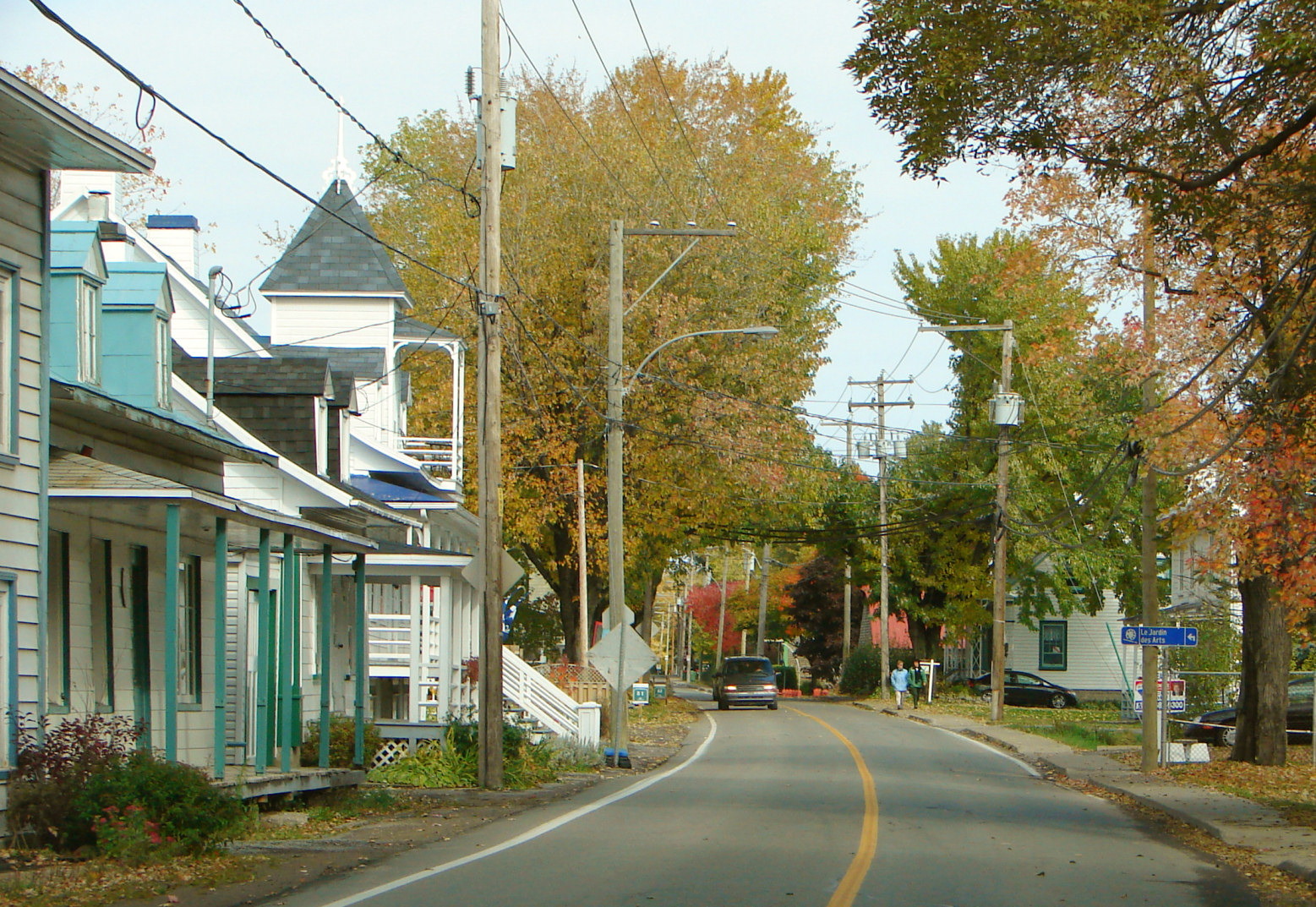

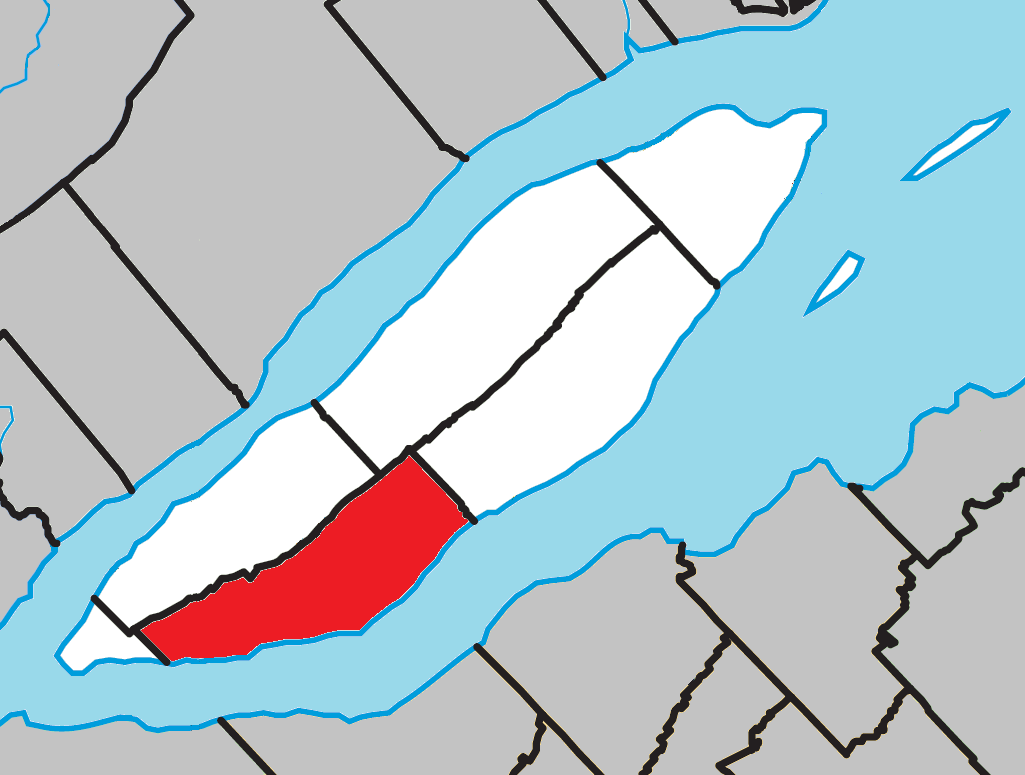
- Location within L'Île-d'Orléans RCM

- Location in central Quebec
- Coordinates: 46°52′N 71°01′W
- Country: Canada
- Province: Quebec
- Region: Capitale-Nationale
- RCM: L'Île-d'Orléans
- Settled: c. 1660
- Constituted: July 1, 1855

Government
  - Mayor: Yves Coulombe
  - Federal riding: Montmorency—Charlevoix
  - Prov. riding: Charlevoix–Côte-de-Beaupré

Area
  - Total: 35.00 km^{2} (13.51 sq mi)
  - Land: 35.86 km^{2} (13.85 sq mi)
- There is an apparent contradiction between two authoritative sources

Population (2016)
  - Total: 1,532
  - Density: 42.7/km^{2} (111/sq mi)
  - Pop 2011-2016: ▼3.0%
  - Dwellings: 827
- Time zone: UTC−5 (EST)
  - Summer (DST): UTC−4 (EDT)
- Postal code(s): G0A 3Z0
- Area codes: 418 and 581
- Highways: R-368
- Website: saintlaurentio.com

Saint-Laurent-de-l'Île-d'Orléans (French pronunciation: [sɛ̃ lɔʁɑ̃ də lil dɔʁleɑ̃], lit. 'Saint-Laurent of the Orléans Island') is a municipality in the Capitale-Nationale region of Quebec, Canada, part of the L'Île-d'Orléans Regional County Municipality. It is situated on the south side of Orléans Island. Prior to June 6, 1998, it was known simply as Saint-Laurent.

Saint-Laurent has been twinned with Tourouvre in France since 1982.

== History ==
The area began to be colonized around 1660. The parish of Saint-Paul was one of four new parishes founded in 1679 on Île d'Orléans. The place near where the church for this parish was built in 1895 was also known as l'Arbre Sec, in reference to a withered tree in the western end of the Île d'Orléans seigneurie. Consequently, the parish was initially known as Saint-Paul-de-l'Arbre-Sec.

In 1698, at the request of François Berthelot, Advisor to the King and Count of Saint-Laurent, the parish was renamed Saint-Laurent, in order to avoid confusion caused by the frequent practice at the time of compound-naming as Saint-Pierre & Saint-Paul.

In 1722, the civil parish is established. In 1845, the Municipality of Saint-Laurent de l'Isle d'Orléans was formed but abolished in 1847 when it became part of the County Municipality. In 1852, the Saint-Laurent-d'Orléans post office opened. In 1855, the municipality was reestablished as the Parish Municipality of Saint-Laurent.

In the 19th century, Saint-Laurent gained a maritime character due to the many fishermen and boatsmen. Moreover, some 15 shipyards were building up to 400 rowboats, coasters, and schooners a year. From 1905 to 1967, the wharf of Saint-Laurent Limitée was active and was responsible for the construction of many of the boats used by the people of Saint-Laurent.

In 1998, the municipality changed statutes and its name, becoming the Municipality of Saint-Laurent-de-l'Île-d'Orléans.

== Demographics ==
=== Population ===
Canada census – Saint-Laurent-de-l'Île-d'Orléans, Quebec community profile

	2021	2016	2011
Population	1,607 (+4.9% from 2016)	1,532 (-3.0% from 2011)	1,580 (-1.3% from 2006)
Land area	35.64 km^{2} (13.76 sq mi)	35.86 km^{2} (13.85 sq mi)	35.72 km^{2} (13.79 sq mi)
Population density	45.1/km^{2} (117/sq mi)	42.7/km^{2} (111/sq mi)	44.2/km^{2} (114/sq mi)
Median age	50.8 (M: 52, F: 50)	51.4 (M: 51.6, F: 51.3)	50.2 (M: 50.0, F: 50.4)
Private dwellings	710 (total)	827 (total)	816 (total)
Median household income		$87,296	$73,675

References: 2021 2016 2011

Historical Census Data - Saint-Laurent-de-l'Île-d'Orléans, Quebec

Year	Pop.	±%
1976	1,344	—
1981	1,404	+4.5%
1986	1,406	+0.1%
1991	1,551	+10.3%
1996	1,576	+1.6%

Year	Pop.	±%
2001	1,617	+2.6%
2006	1,601	−1.0%
2011	1,580	−1.3%
2016	1,532	−3.0%

Source: Statistics Canada

=== Language ===
Canada Census Mother Tongue - Saint-Laurent-de-l'Île-d'Orléans, Quebec
Census	Total	French			English			French & English			Other		
Year	Responses	Count	Trend	Pop %	Count	Trend	Pop %	Count	Trend	Pop %	Count	Trend	Pop %
2011	1,580	1,545	▼1.3%	97.78%	20	▲33.3%	1.27%	0	0.0%	0.00%	15	▲ n/a%	0.95%
2006	1,580	1,565	▼1.3%	99.05%	15	▼25.0%	0.95%	0	0.0%	0.00%	0	0.0%	0.00%
2001	1,605	1,585	▲1.2%	98.75%	20	▲33.3%	1.25%	0	0.0%	0.00%	0	▼100.0%	0.00%
1996	1,570	1,545	n/a	98.41%	15	n/a	0.95%	0	n/a	0.00%	10	n/a	0.64%

== Tourism and attractions ==
Saint-Laurent-de-l'Île-d'Orléans is part of the Historic District of Île d'Orléans, and has many classified or recognized monuments. Besides the village boutiques, shops, and art galleries, the main attraction is the Saint-Laurent Maritime Park (Parc Maritime de Saint-Laurent). This park preserves the maritime heritage, featuring exhibits and guided tours at the former Saint-Laurent Ltd. shipyard.

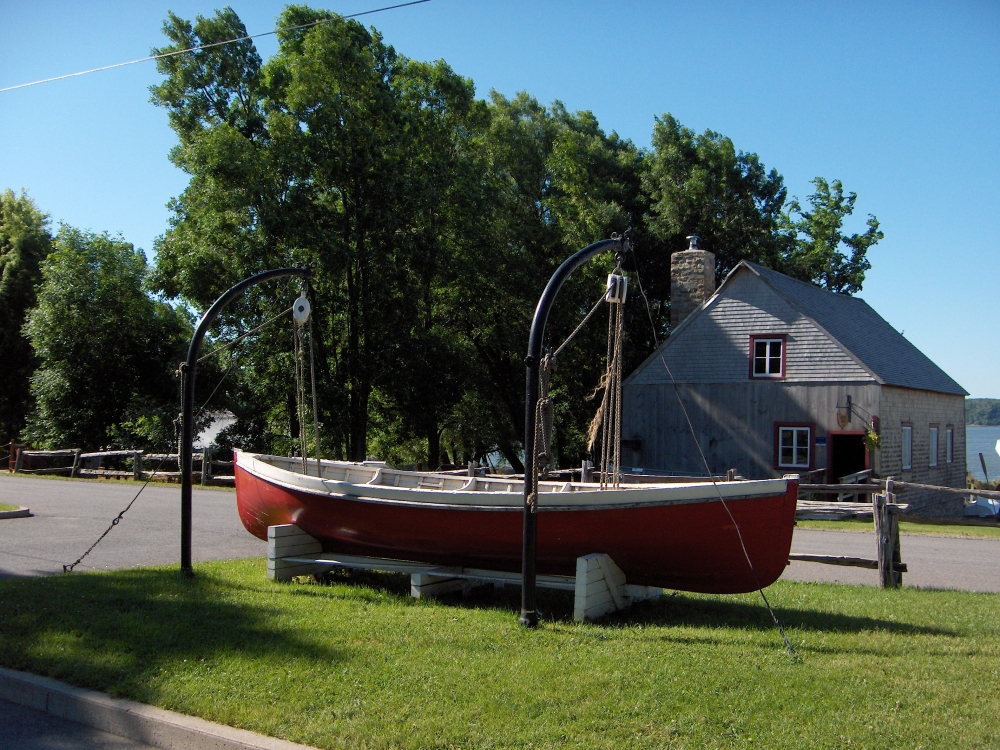
Parc Maritime de Saint-Laurent

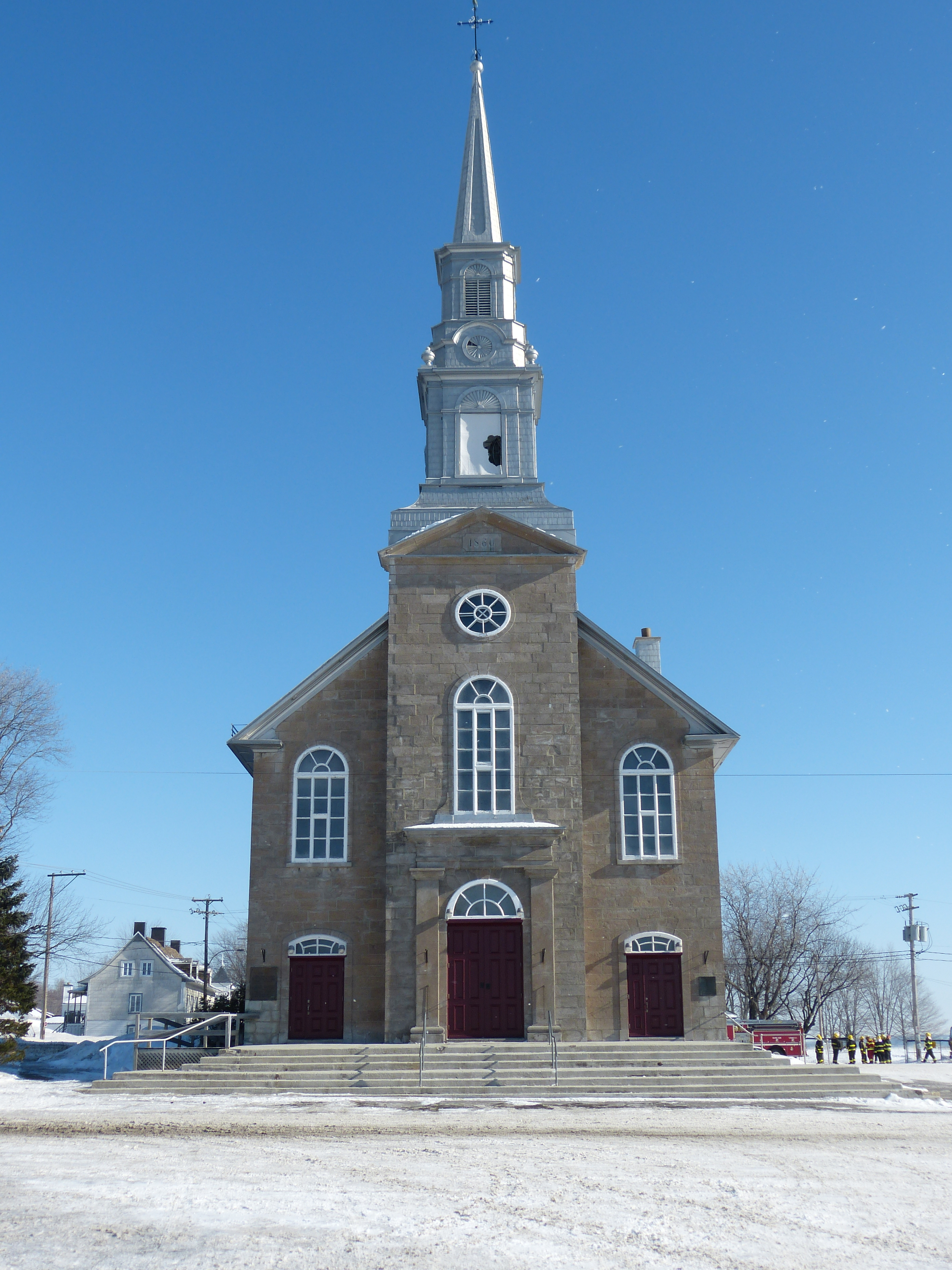
Saint-Laurent church

== See also ==
- List of municipalities in Quebec
