= Saint-François-de-l'Île-d'Orléans =

- Municipality
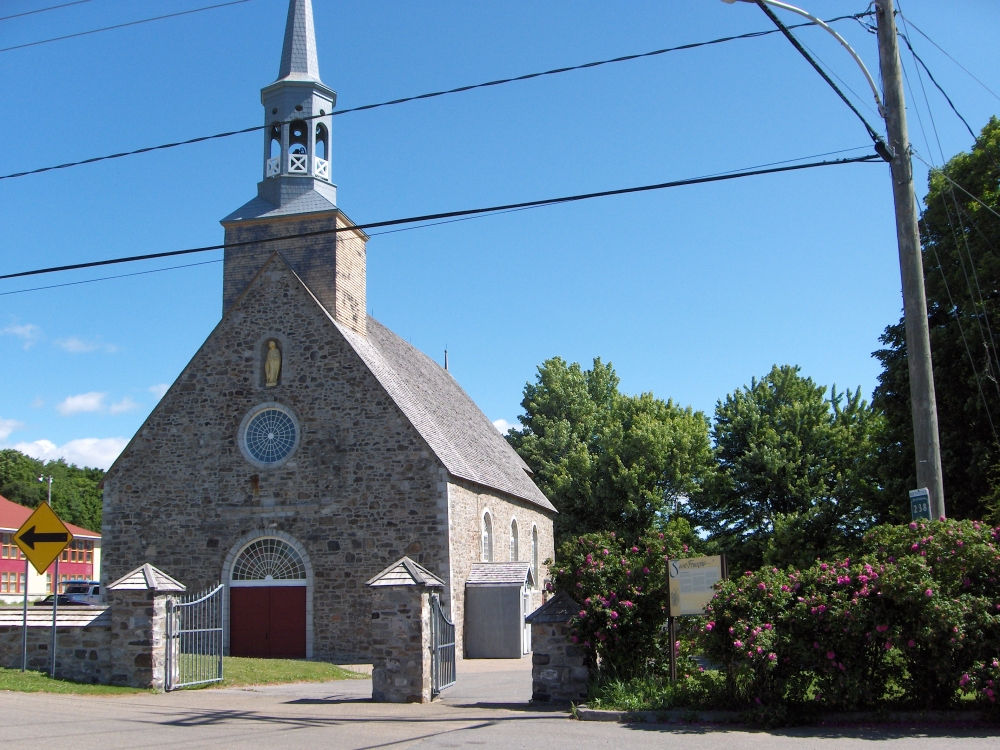
- Church of Saint-François-de-l'Île-d'Orléans

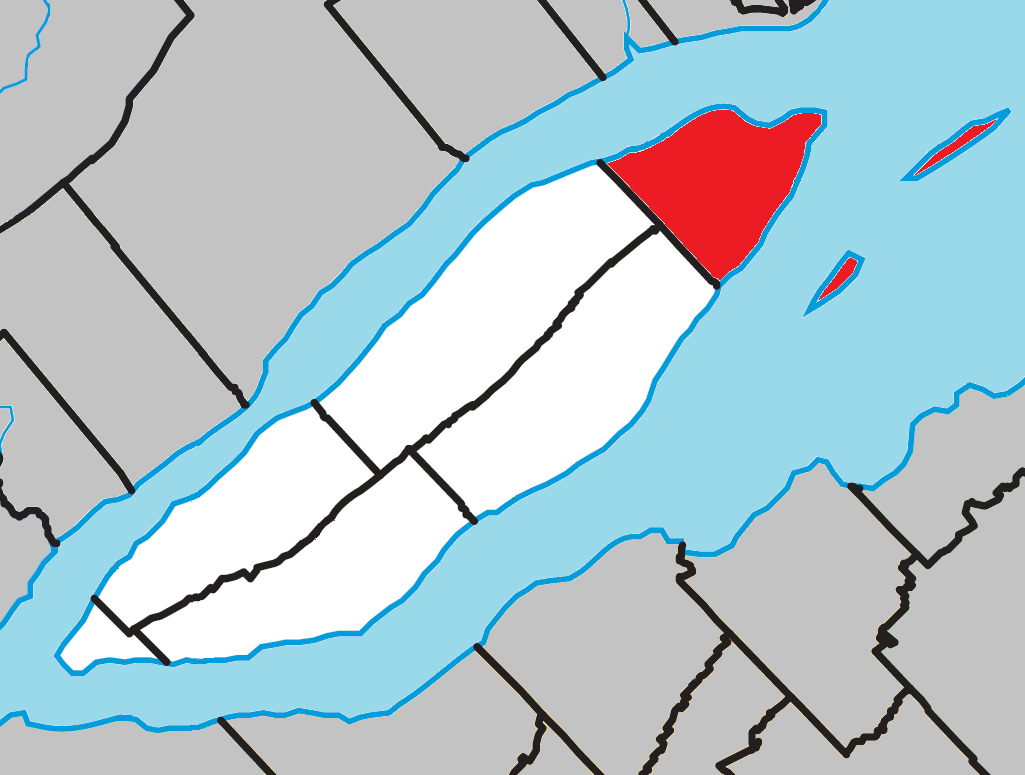
- Location within L'Île-d'Orléans RCM

- Location in central Quebec
- Coordinates: 47°00′N 70°49′W
- Country: Canada
- Province: Quebec
- Region: Capitale-Nationale
- RCM: L'Île-d'Orléans
- Settled: 1670s
- Constituted: July 1, 1855

Government
  - Mayor: Lina Labbé
  - Federal riding: Montmorency—Charlevoix
  - Prov. riding: Charlevoix–Côte-de-Beaupré

Area
  - Total: 102.80 km^{2} (39.69 sq mi)
  - Land: 28.96 km^{2} (11.18 sq mi)

Population (2021)
  - Total: 536
  - Density: 18.5/km^{2} (48/sq mi)
  - Pop 2016-2021: ▲1.7%
  - Dwellings: 359
- Time zone: UTC−5 (EST)
  - Summer (DST): UTC−4 (EDT)
- Postal code(s): G0A 3S0
- Area codes: 418 and 581
- Highways: R-368
- Website: msfio.ca

Saint-François-de-l'Île-d'Orléans (French pronunciation: [sɛ̃ fʁɑ̃swa də lil dɔʁleɑ̃], lit. 'Saint-François of the Orléans Island') is a municipality in the Capitale-Nationale region of Quebec, Canada, part of the L'Île-d'Orléans Regional County Municipality. The village is situated on the north-eastern tip of Orléans Island, and the municipality also includes the Madame and Ruau Islands, part of the Montmagny Archipelago.

Prior to December 20, 2003, it was known simply as Saint-François.

== History ==
The Parish of Saint-François-de-Sales was founded in 1679, named after Francis de Sales (1567–1622) and calling to mind Francois Berthelot, Comte de Jouy and de Saint-Laurent, representative of Paris in parliament and Seigneur of Île d'Orléans (1675) at the time the parish was established. It was also known as just Saint-François, and maps of the seventeenth and eighteenth centuries would show either one or the other form. In 1845, the Parish Municipality of Saint-François-Isle-d'Orléans was formed, but abolished in 1847 when it became part of the County Municipality. In 1852, the local post office opened. In 1855, the parish municipality was reestablished.

In 2003, the Parish Municipality of Saint-François changed its statutes and was renamed to the Municipality of Saint-François-de-l'Île-d'Orléans.

== Demographics ==
=== Population ===
Canada census – Saint-François-de-l'Île-d'Orléans, Quebec community profile

	2021	2016	2011
Population	536 (+1.7% from 2016)	527 (0.0% from 2011)	527 (-8.0% from 2006)
Land area	28.96 km^{2} (11.18 sq mi)	28.84 km^{2} (11.14 sq mi)	29.21 km^{2} (11.28 sq mi)
Population density	18.5/km^{2} (48/sq mi)	18.3/km^{2} (47/sq mi)	18.0/km^{2} (47/sq mi)
Median age	55.6 (M: 56.8, F: 54)	54.6 (M: 54.0, F: 55.8)	52.9 (M: 51.6, F: 54.1)
Private dwellings	255 (total)	384 (total)	359 (total)
Median household income	$81,000	$67,840	$.N/A

Notes: 2011 income data for this area has been suppressed for data quality or confidentiality reasons.
References: 2021 2016 2011

Historical Census Data - Saint-François-de-l'Île-d'Orléans, Quebec

Year	Pop.	±%
1861	561	—
1871	552	−1.6%
1881	496	−10.1%
1891	508	+2.4%
1901	496	−2.4%
1911	481	−3.0%
1921	414	−13.9%
1931	473	+14.3%
1941	517	+9.3%
1951	526	+1.7%
1956	557	+5.9%
1961	508	−8.8%

Year	Pop.	±%
1966	510	+0.4%
1971	485	−4.9%
1976	456	−6.0%
1981	515	+12.9%
1986	483	−6.2%
1991	493	+2.1%
1996	484	−1.8%
2001	489	+1.0%
2006	573	+17.2%
2011	527	−8.0%
2016	527	+0.0%
2021	536	+1.7%

Source: Statistics Canada

=== Language ===
Canada Census Mother Tongue - Saint-François-de-l'Île-d'Orléans, Quebec
Census	Total	French			English			French & English			Other		
Year	Responses	Count	Trend	Pop %	Count	Trend	Pop %	Count	Trend	Pop %	Count	Trend	Pop %
2021	540	525	▲1.9%	97.2%	10	▲100.0%	1.9%	5	0.0%	0.9%	0	▼100.0%	0.0%
2016	530	515	▲2.0%	97.2%	5	▼66.7%	0.9%	5	▲ n/a%	0.9%	5	▼50.0%	0.9%
2011	530	505	▼8.2%	95.3%	15	0.0%	2.8%	0	0.0%	0.0%	10	0.0%	1.9%
2006	575	550	▲12.2%	95.7%	15	▲ n/a%	2.6%	0	0.0%	0.0%	10	▲ n/a%	1.7%
2001	490	490	0.0%	100.0%	0	0.0%	0.0%	0	0.0%	0.0%	0	0.0%	0.0%
1996	490	490	n/a	100.0%	0	n/a	0.0%	0	n/a	0.0%	0	n/a	0.0%

== Government ==
List of former mayors:

- Yoland Dion (2001–2009)
- Lina Labbé (2009–present)

== See also ==
- Chenal de l'Île d'Orléans
- Île d'Orléans
- List of municipalities in Quebec
