= Saint-Jean-de-l'Île-d'Orléans =

- Municipality
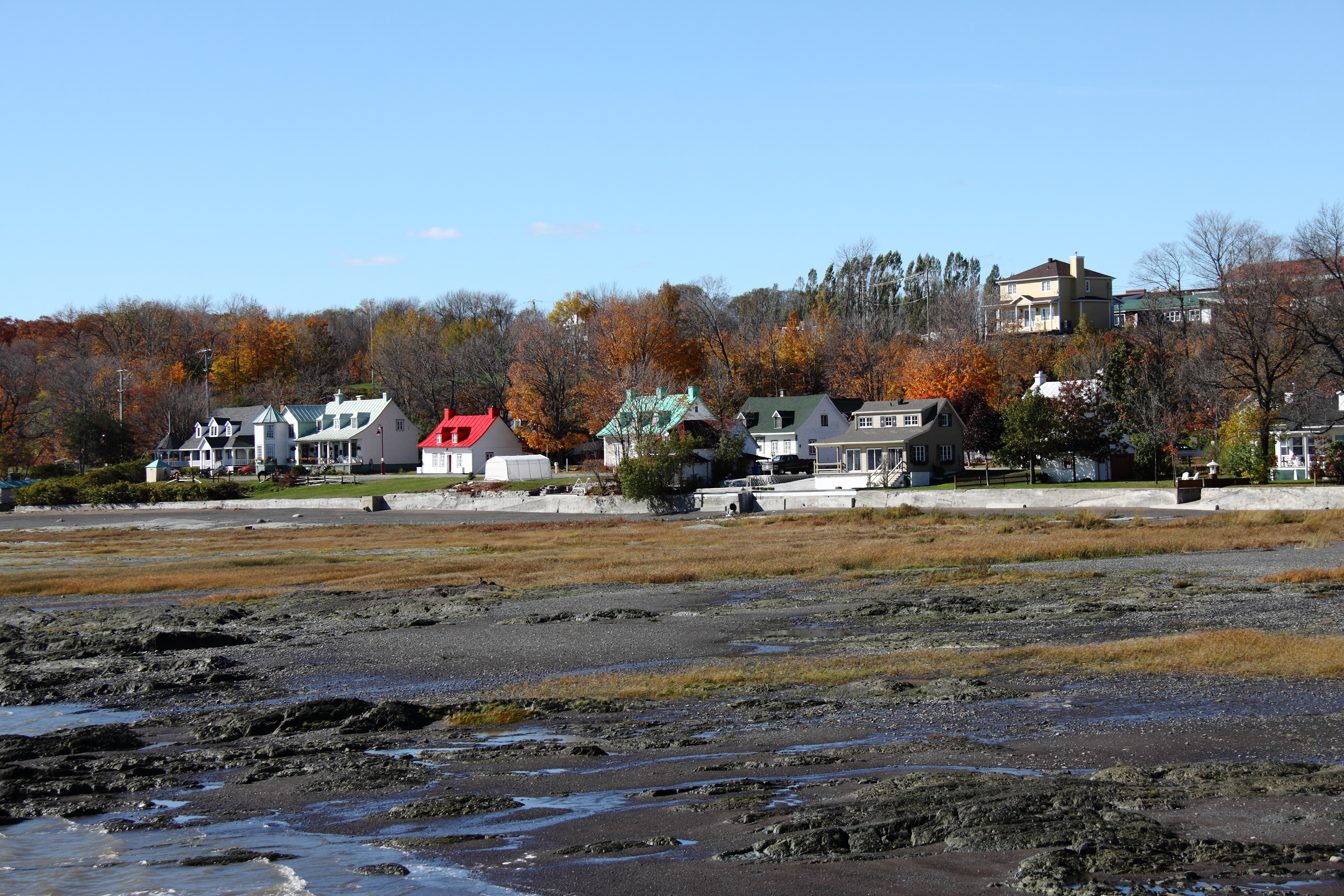

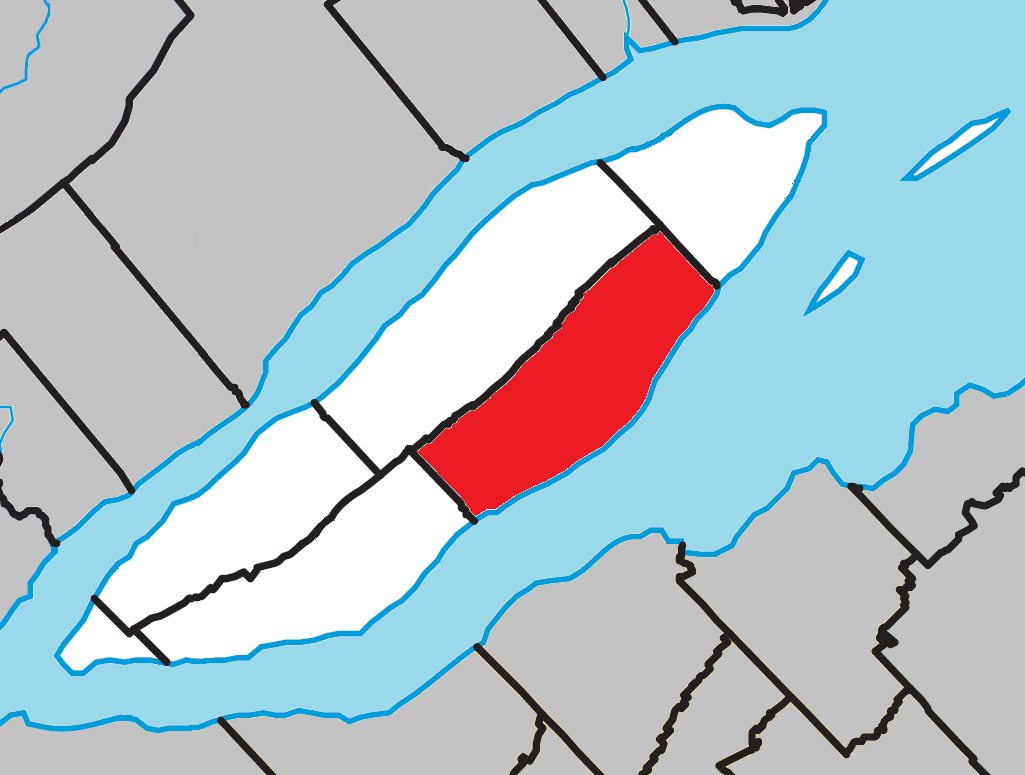
- Location within L'Île-d'Orléans RCM

- Location in central Quebec
- Coordinates: 46°55′N 70°54′W
- Country: Canada
- Province: Quebec
- Region: Capitale-Nationale
- RCM: L'Île-d'Orléans
- Constituted: July 1, 1855

Government
  - Mayor: Jean-Claude Pouliot
  - Federal riding: Montmorency—Charlevoix
  - Prov. riding: Charlevoix–Côte-de-Beaupré

Area
  - Total: 43.50 km^{2} (16.80 sq mi)
  - Land: 43.63 km^{2} (16.85 sq mi)

Population (2016)
  - Total: 1,059
  - Density: 24.3/km^{2} (63/sq mi)
  - Pop 2011-2016: ▲14.7%
  - Dwellings: 681
- Time zone: UTC−5 (EST)
  - Summer (DST): UTC−4 (EDT)
- Postal code(s): G0A 3W0
- Area codes: 418 and 581
- Highways: R-368
- Website: www.stjeanio.ca

Saint-Jean-de-l'Île-d'Orléans (French pronunciation: [sɛ̃ ʒɑ̃ də lil dɔʁleɑ̃], lit. 'Saint-Jean of the Orléans Island') is a municipality in the Capitale-Nationale region of Quebec, Canada. It is part of the L'Île-d'Orléans Regional County Municipality, on the southeastern side of Île d'Orléans.

Prior to April 5, 2003, it was known simply as Saint-Jean.

== History ==
The area was first colonized early in the 17th century. In 1680, a mission was founded and served by the priest of Sainte-Famille. In 1714, the Parish of Saint-Jean-Baptiste was formed and became a civil parish in 1722. It is believed that this name commemorates Jean de Lauson, Seneschal in New France and son of Governor Lauson, born circa 1620 and killed at the mouth of the Maheu River in 1661 by the Iroquois. Nevertheless, it could also be attributed to John the Baptist in line with the many other religious toponyms on the island.

Although having a well-established agricultural history, Saint-Jean's location on the Saint Lawrence River prompted also development of maritime and fishing trades. It was especially known for its river pilots who would guide vessels through the treacherous Saint Lawrence navigation channel. Over the centuries, a great number of river pilots came from Saint-Jean.

In 1845 the Municipality of Saint-Jean was formed, but abolished in 1847 when it became part of the County Municipality. In 1852, its post office opened. In 1855, it was reestablished as the Parish Municipality of Saint-Jean-Baptiste. In 2003, it changed statutes and its name, becoming the Municipality of Saint-Jean-de-l'Île-d'Orléans.

== Demographics ==
=== Population ===
Canada census – Saint-Jean-de-l'Île-d'Orléans, Quebec community profile

	2021	2016	2011
Population	1,026 (-3.1% from 2016)	1,059 (14.7% from 2011)	923 (-4.6% from 2006)
Land area	43.48 km^{2} (16.79 sq mi)	43.63 km^{2} (16.85 sq mi)	43.49 km^{2} (16.79 sq mi)
Population density	23.6/km^{2} (61/sq mi)	24.3/km^{2} (63/sq mi)	21.2/km^{2} (55/sq mi)
Median age	55.6 (M: 56, F: 54.8)	53.9 (M: 54.8, F: 52.8)	53.3 (M: 54.6, F: 52.3)
Private dwellings	490 (total)	681 (total)	690 (total)
Median household income		$72,363	$.N/A

Notes: 2011 income data for this area has been suppressed for data quality or confidentiality reasons.
References: 2021 2016 2011

Historical Census Data - Saint-Jean-de-l'Île-d'Orléans, Quebec

Year	Pop.	±%
1976	812	—
1981	842	+3.7%
1986	894	+6.2%
1991	832	−6.9%
1996	847	+1.8%

Year	Pop.	±%
2001	862	+1.8%
2006	968	+12.3%
2011	923	−4.6%
2016	1,059	+14.7%

Source: Statistics Canada

=== Language ===
Canada Census Mother Tongue - Saint-Jean-de-l'Île-d'Orléans, Quebec
Census	Total	French			English			French & English			Other		
Year	Responses	Count	Trend	Pop %	Count	Trend	Pop %	Count	Trend	Pop %	Count	Trend	Pop %
2016	1,060	1,035	▲14.4%	97.6%	15	▲200.0%	1.4%	0	0.0%	0.0%	15	▲200.0%	1.4%
2011	915	905	▼1.1%	98.91%	5	▲ n/a%	0.55%	0	▼100.0%	0.00%	5	▼50.0%	0.55%
2006	965	915	▲6.4%	94.82%	0	0.0%	0.00%	40	▲ n/a%	4.14%	10	▲ n/a%	1.04%
2001	860	860	▲6.8%	100.00%	0	0.0%	0.00%	0	0.0%	0.00%	0	0.0%	0.00%
1996	835	805	n/a	96.41%	10	n/a	1.20%	0	n/a	0.00%	20	n/a	2.39%

== Tourism and attractions ==
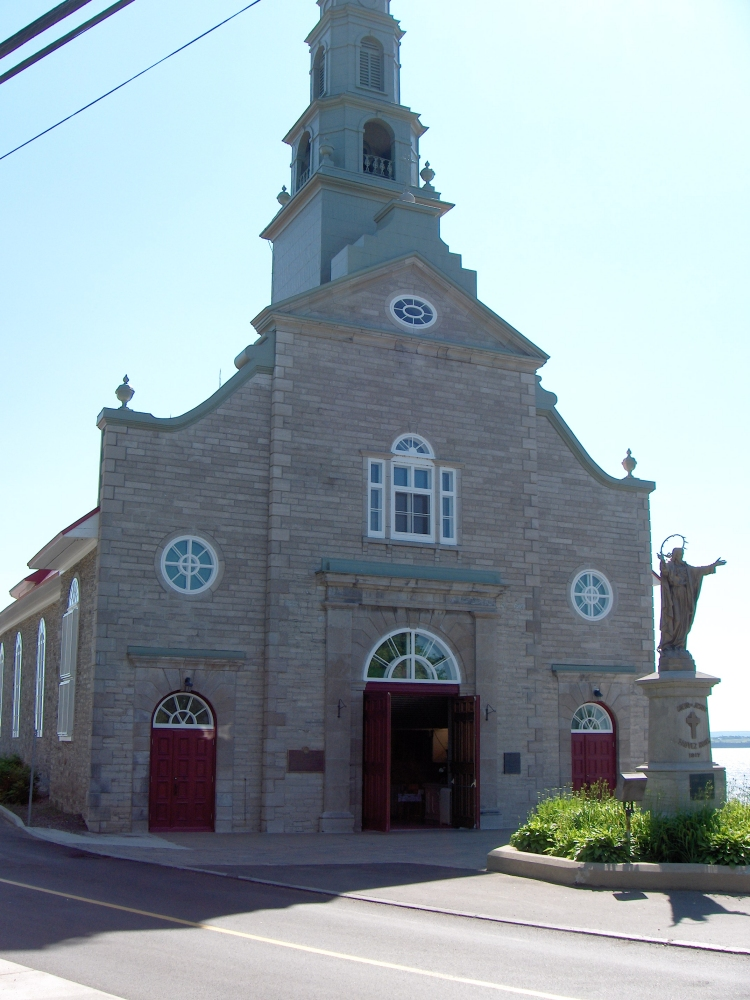
The church of Saint-Jean-de-l'Île-d'Orléans, built in 1734, and listed as a historic building.

Like the neighbouring municipalities, Saint-Jean has a rich cultural heritage with many historic buildings. Just past the heart of the village, there is a long line of quaint houses (formerly belonging to river pilots), art galleries, and artists' studios. Of particular interest is the Mauvide-Genest Manor, a rare and exceptional example of French seigneurial past and one of the oldest remaining manor houses in Quebec. This National Historic Site was built in 1734 and restored in 1999, and is now open to the public as a historic interpretation centre.

== See also ==
- List of municipalities in Quebec
