= L'Île-d'Orléans Regional County Municipality =

L'Île-d'Orléans
- Regional county municipality
- Coordinates: 46°55′N 70°54′W
- Country: Canada
- Province: Quebec
- Region: Capitale-Nationale
- Effective: January 1, 1982
- County seat: Sainte-Famille-de-l'Île-d'Orléans

Government
  - Type: Prefecture
  - Prefect: Jean-Pierre Turcotte

Area
  - Total: 268.50 km^{2} (103.67 sq mi)
  - Land: 192.85 km^{2} (74.46 sq mi)

Population (2016)
  - Total: 7,082
  - Density: 36.7/km^{2} (95/sq mi)
  - Change 2011–2016: ▲5.5%
  - Dwellings: 3,703
- Time zone: UTC−5 (EST)
  - Summer (DST): UTC−4 (EDT)
- Area codes: 418 and 581
- Website: mrc.iledorleans.com

L'Île-d'Orléans (French pronunciation: [lil dɔʁleɑ̃]) is a regional county municipality in central Quebec, Canada, in the Capitale-Nationale region. Its seat is Sainte-Famille-de-l'Île-d'Orléans. The population in the 2016 census was 7,082 people.

The RCM consists solely of the Île d'Orléans, an island in the Saint Lawrence River just east of Quebec City. It is the smallest RCM in Quebec in terms of land area (though not in total area including water).

== Subdivisions ==
There are 6 subdivisions within the RCM:

Municipalities (5)

- Sainte-Famille-de-l'Île-d'Orléans
- Saint-François-de-l'Île-d'Orléans
- Saint-Jean-de-l'Île-d'Orléans
- Saint-Laurent-de-l'Île-d'Orléans
- Saint-Pierre-de-l'Île-d'Orléans

Villages (1)

- Sainte-Pétronille

== Demographics ==
=== Population ===
Canada census – L'Île-d'Orléans community profile

	2021	2016	2011
Population	6,817 (-3.7% from 2016)	7,082 (+5.5% from 2011)	6,711 (-2.2% from 2006)
Land area	194.58 km^{2} (75.13 sq mi)	192.85 km^{2} (74.46 sq mi)	192.81 km^{2} (74.44 sq mi)
Population density	35/km^{2} (91/sq mi)	36.7/km^{2} (95/sq mi)	34.8/km^{2} (90/sq mi)
Median age	53.6 (M: 54.4, F: 52.8)	52.0 (M: 52.3, F: 51.7)	49.7 (M: 49.8, F: 49.5)
Private dwellings	3,513 (total) 3,033 (occupied)	3,703 (total)	3,470 (total)
Median household income	$89,000	$77,568	$64,483

References: 2021 2016 2011

Historical Census Data - L'Île-d'Orléans Regional County Municipality, Quebec

Year	Pop.	±%
1991	6,938	—
1996	6,892	−0.7%
2001	6,779	−1.6%

Year	Pop.	±%
2006	6,862	+1.2%
2011	6,711	−2.2%
2016	7,082	+5.5%

Source: Statistics Canada

=== Language ===
Canada Census Mother Tongue - L'Île-d'Orléans Regional County Municipality, Quebec
Census	Total	French			English			French & English			Other		
Year	Responses	Count	Trend	Pop %	Count	Trend	Pop %	Count	Trend	Pop %	Count	Trend	Pop %
2016	7,020	6,860	▲5.9%	97.72%	70	▼6.7%	1.07%	15	▲50.0%	0.21%	75	▲66.7%	1.07%
2011	6,610	6,480	▼0.9%	98.03%	75	▼6.3%	1.13%	10	▼81.8%	0.15%	45	▼57.1%	0.68%
2006	6,780	6,540	▼1.6%	96.46%	80	▲220.0%	1.18%	55	▲175.0%	0.81%	105	▲600.0%	1.55%
2001	6,705	6,645	▼0.7%	99.11%	25	▼37.5%	0.37%	20	0.0%	0.30%	15	▼40.0%	0.22%
1996	6,780	6,695	n/a	98.75%	40	n/a	0.59%	20	n/a	0.29%	25	n/a	0.37%

== Transportation ==
=== Access Routes ===
Highways and numbered routes that run through the municipality, including external routes that start or finish at the county border:

- Autoroutes
  - None
- Principal Highways
  - None
- Secondary Highways
  - R-368
- External Routes
  - None

== See also ==
- List of regional county municipalities and equivalent territories in Quebec
