= Quebec Route 368 =

Highway in Quebec, Canada

Route 368

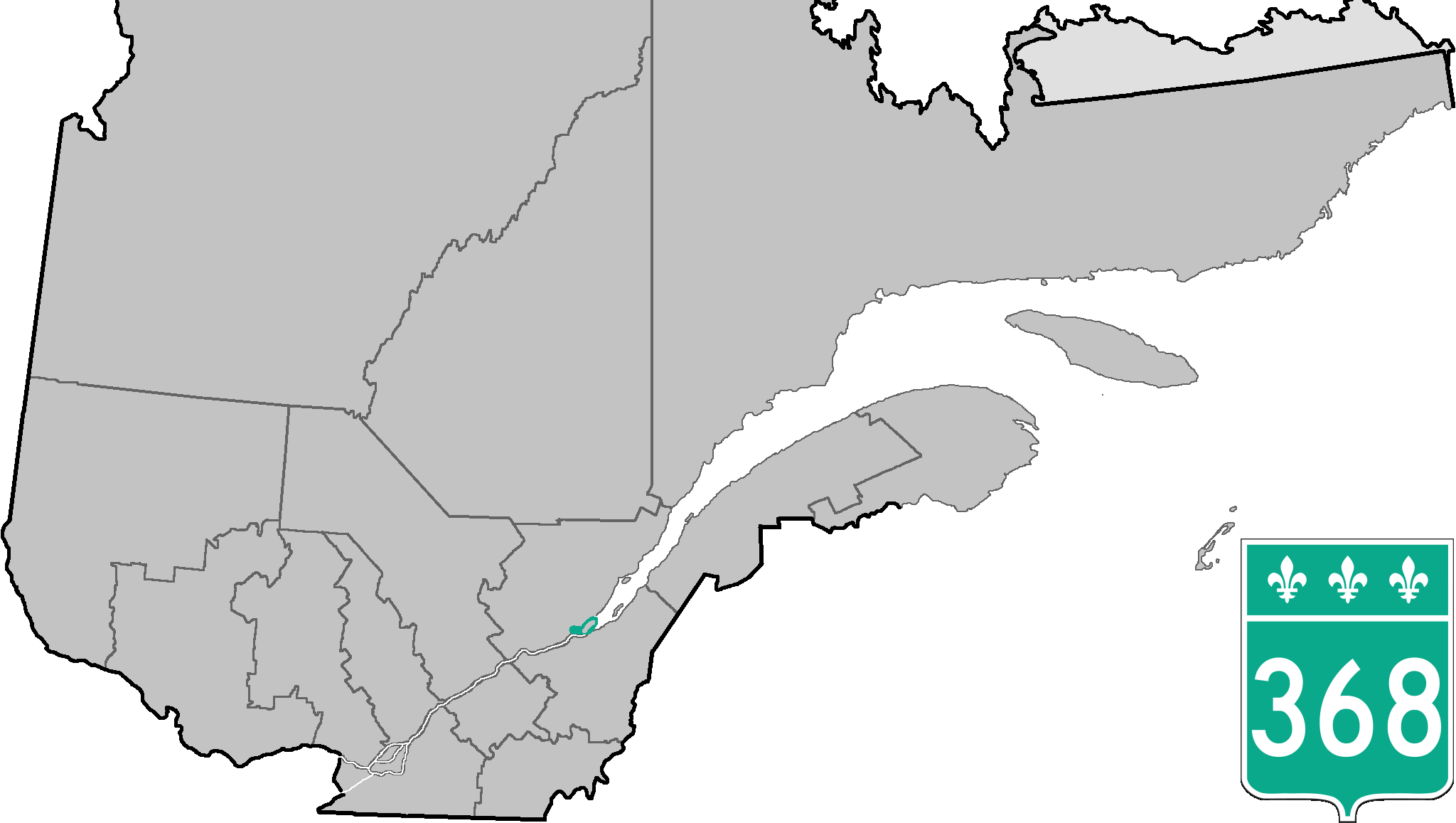

Route information
- Maintained by Transports Québec
- Length: 72 km (45 mi)

Major junctions
- West end: A-40 / R-138 in Quebec City (Beauport)
- East end: R-368 near Saint-Pierre-de-l'Île-d'Orléans

Location
- Country: Canada
- Province: Quebec
- Major cities: Quebec City

Highway system
- Quebec provincial highways; Autoroutes; List; Former
← R-367	→ R-369

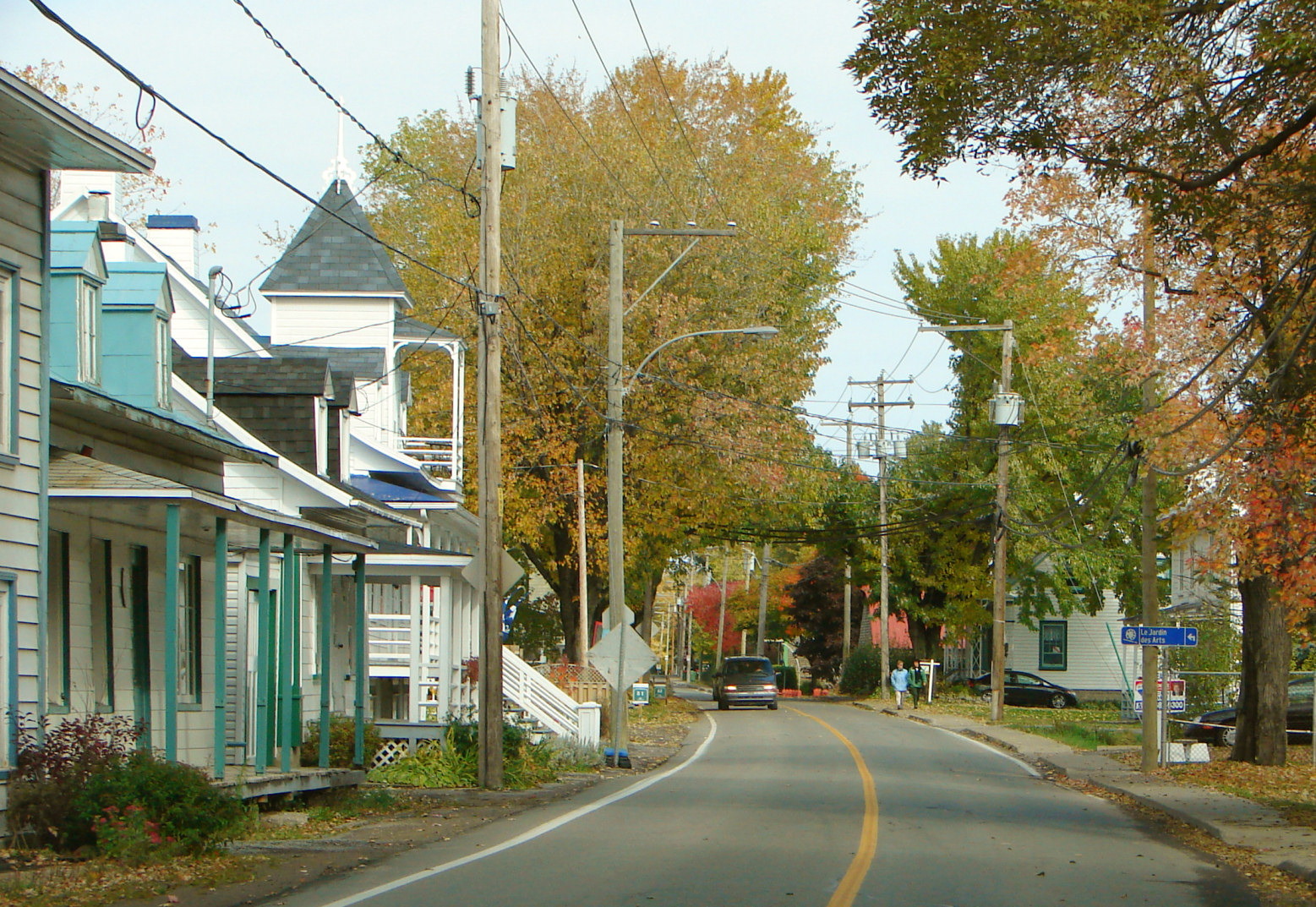
Route 368 in the centre of Saint-Laurent

Route 368 is a 72 km two-lane east–west highway in Quebec, Canada, which is located on Île d'Orléans and includes the Pont de l'Île which connects the island to the mainland. It starts at the junction of Autoroute 40 at exit 325 in Beauport, now part of Quebec City, crosses the bridge and it follows around the island's perimeter, passing through all 6 villages on the island.

On Orleans Island, the route is also known as Chemin Royal (Royal Road) which was completed in 1744.

== Towns located along Route 368 ==
- Beauport, Quebec City
- Saint-Pierre-de-l'Île-d'Orléans
- Sainte-Famille-de-l'Île-d'Orléans
- Saint-Francois
- Saint-Jean
- Saint-Laurent-de-l'Ile-d'Orleans
- Sainte-Pétronille

== See also ==
- List of Quebec provincial highways
