= Métabetchouane =

Métabetchouane may refer to:

- Métabetchouan–Lac-à-la-Croix, a town in the Lac-Saint-Jean-Est Regional County Municipality, Saguenay–Lac-Saint-Jean, Quebec, Canada
- Métabetchouane Lake, a lake in Lac-Moncouche, Quebec, Lac-Saint-Jean-Est Regional County Municipality, Saguenay–Lac-Saint-Jean, Quebec, Canada
- Métabetchouane River, a river crossing the La Jacques-Cartier, La Tuque, Lac-Saint-Jean-Est and Le Domaine-du-Roy Regional County Municipality in Quebec, Canada
- Métabetchouane East River, a river flowing in Lac-Jacques-Cartier, La Côte-de-Beaupré Regional County Municipality, Capitale-Nationale, Quebec, Canada
- Métabetchouane archaeological site, an archaeological site in Chambord, Quebec, Canada
- Powder magazine at Poste-de-Traite-de-la-Métabetchouane, an outbuilding in Desbiens, in Quebec, Canada
