= Powder magazine at Poste-de-Traite-de-la-Métabetchouane =

Coordinates: 48°25′12″N 71°57′48″W

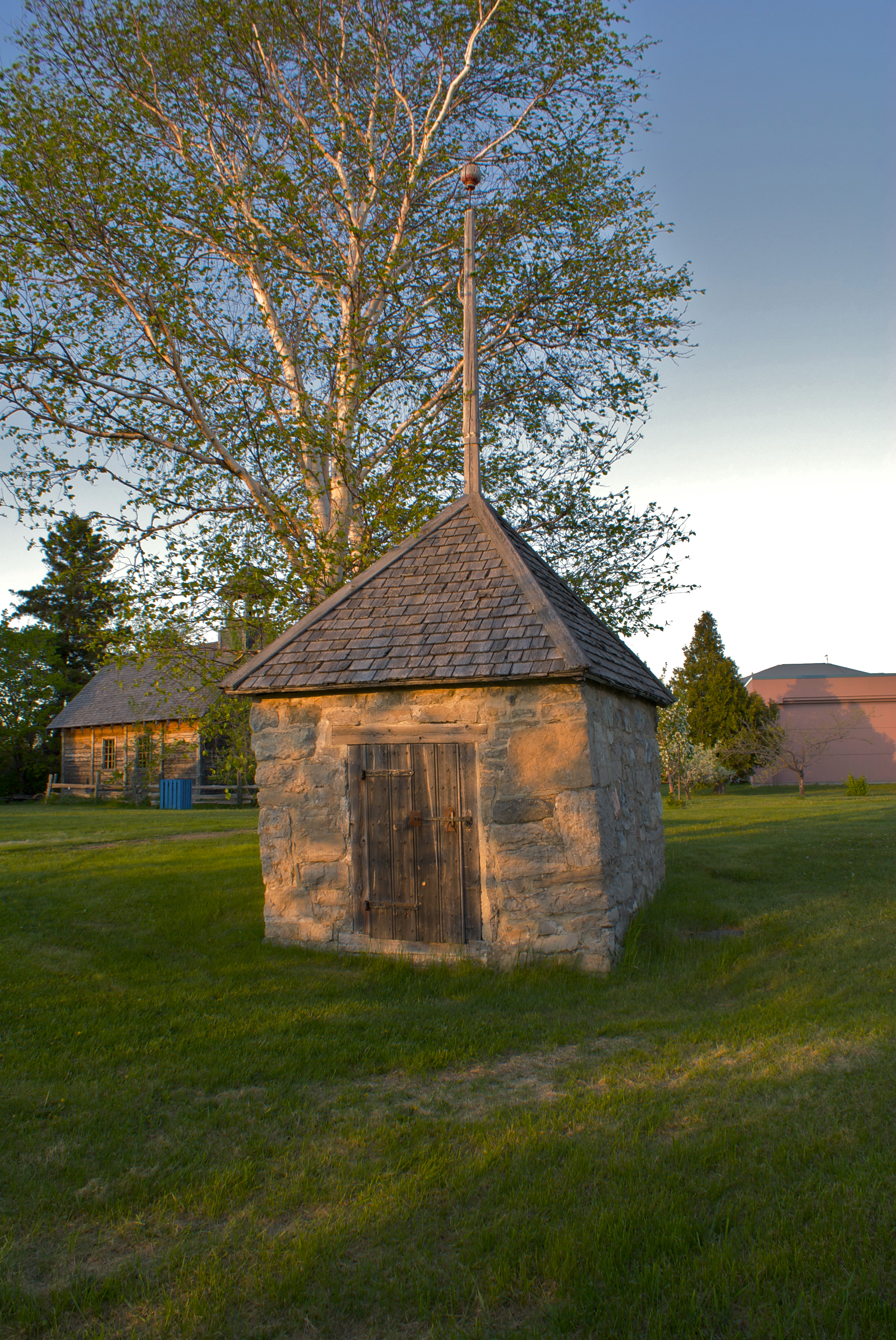
Powder magazine

The powder magazine of Poste-de-Traite-de-la-Métabetchouane is an outbuilding built between 1760 and 1788 located in Desbiens in Quebec (Canada). It is the only surviving building of the Métabetchouane post, a trading post established at the mouth of the Métabetchouane River on Lac Saint-Jean. It is located on the site of the Métabetchouane archaeological site.

== History ==
The powder magazine at Poste-de-Traite-de-la-Métabetchouane is located near an important meeting site for Amerindians which has been frequented for nearly 6,000 years (190,000 Ms). The place was visited by the Jesuits in the 18th century. The Métabetchouane trading post was established by the governor Jean de Lauson in 1652. It was located in domaine du roy, that is to say that it was part of a vast territory not conceded to colonization, the profits from which they exploited returned in principle to the king. In 1676, there established a Jesuit mission at the same time as that of the Chicoutimi trading post. It was abandoned in 1697 in favor of that of Chicoutimi.

The post was re-established following the Conquest in 1760. The magazine was built between 1760 and 1778. In 1802, the North West Company took over the operation of the post Métabetchouane. In 1821, this company was amalgamated with the Hudson's Bay Company. In 1880, the post was abandoned in favor of a new trading post in Pointe-Bleue, now Mashteuiatsh.

The powder magazine was classified as heritage building on 1967-01-19 by the Ministry of Cultural Affairs. It is located near the Métabetchouane archaeological site and can be visited.

== Architecture ==
The powder magazine is a small rectangular stone building. It has no window. The roof is pavilion with a mast at the top and is covered with cedar shingle.

== See also ==
- List of historic places in Saguenay-Lac-Saint-Jean
- List of the real estate heritage of Saguenay–Lac-Saint-Jean
