= List of historic places in Lanaudière =

This is a list of historic places in Lanaudière, entered on the Canadian Register of Historic Places, whether they are federal, provincial, or municipal. All addresses are the administrative Region 14. For all other listings in the province of Quebec, see List of historic places in Quebec.

Name	Address	Coordinates	Government recognition (CRHP №)	Wikidata ID	Image
Chapelle Cuthbert	Rue De Bienville; Berthierville QC	46°05′24″N 73°10′40″W	Quebec (9816)		More images
Site historique de l'Église-de-Sainte-Geneviève-de-Berthier	Berthierville QC	46°04′53″N 73°10′42″W	Quebec (13116)		
Église de Sainte-Geneviève	Rue de Montcalm; Sainte-Geneviève-de-Berthier QC	46°04′53″N 73°10′42″W	Quebec (14781)		More images
Cathédrale de Joliette	2, Rue Saint-Charles-Borromee Nord; Joliette QC	46°01′38″N 73°26′11″W	Quebec (15284)		More images
Évêché de Joliette	2, Rue Saint-Charles-Borromee Nord; Joliette QC	46°01′37″N 73°26′17″W	Quebec (11989)		
Joliette Court House National Historic Site of Canada	450 St. Louis Street; Joliette QC	46°01′34″N 73°26′32″W	Federal (12609)		
Vieux palais de justice de L'Assomption	255, Rue Saint-Etienne; L'Assomption QC	45°49′36″N 73°25′12″W	Quebec (5632)		More images
Maison de la Culture	375, Rue Saint-Pierre; L'Assomption QC	45°49′32″N 73°25′25″W	Quebec (8155)		More images
Presbytère de L'Assomption-de-la-Sainte-Vierge	153, Rue du Portage; L'Assomption QC	45°49′31″N 73°25′27″W	Quebec (12383)		
Gare de L'Épihanie	Rue Onulphe-Peltier; L'Épiphanie QC	45°50′34″N 73°28′39″W	Quebec (4555)		More images
Maison Poitras	960, Rang l'Achigan Sud; L'Épiphanie QC	45°50′25″N 73°30′02″W	Quebec (4333)		More images
Maison Hervieux	947, Grande Cote Ouest; Lanoraie QC	45°55′10″N 73°15′28″W	Quebec (8972)		
Moulin à vent Grenier	14, Rue du Vieux-Moulin; Repentigny QC	45°46′03″N 73°25′04″W	Quebec (4454)		More images
Moulin à vent Antoine-Jetté	861, Rue Notre-Dame Est; Repentigny QC	45°45′53″N 73°25′14″W	Quebec (4458)		More images
Église de la Purification-de-la-Bienheureuse-Vierge-Marie	Rue Notre-Dame; Repentigny QC	45°44′20″N 73°26′50″W	Quebec (12371)		
Maison Antoine-Lacombe	895, Rue de la Visitation; Saint-Charles-Borromée QC	46°03′19″N 73°28′32″W	Quebec (5069)		More images
Presbytère de Saint-Cuthbert	1191, Rue Principale; Saint-Cuthbert QC	46°08′56″N 73°13′19″W	Quebec (4468)		
Couvent des sœurs de Sainte-Anne	122, Rue Saint-Jacques; Saint-Jacques QC	45°56′58″N 73°34′45″W	Quebec (10721)		
Église de Saint-Jacques	110, Rue Saint-Jacques; Saint-Jacques QC	45°56′56″N 73°34′17″W	Quebec (10716)		
Ancien Bureau de poste	105, Rue Saint-Jacques; Saint-Jacques QC	45°56′55″N 73°34′17″W	Quebec (10717)		
Maison Louise-Pariseau	107, Rue Saint-Jacques; Saint-Jacques QC	45°56′55″N 73°34′17″W	Quebec (10718)		
Presbytère de Saint-Jacques	102, Rue Saint-Jacques; Saint-Jacques QC	45°56′56″N 73°34′15″W	Quebec (10719)		
Vieux Collège	50, Rue Saint-Jacques; Saint-Jacques QC	45°56′52″N 73°34′09″W	Quebec (10720)		
Monument funéraire de Louis Cyr	Saint-Jean-de-Matha QC	46°13′22″N 73°32′34″W	Quebec (14410)		
Sir Wilfrid Laurier National Historic Site of Canada	1061-1062 12th Avenue; Saint-Lin–Laurentides QC	45°51′09″N 73°45′28″W	Federal (9215, (11079)		
Église de Saint-Paul	Boulevard Brassard; Saint-Paul QC	45°59′02″N 73°26′48″W	Quebec (11336)		
Maison Morrissette	1520, Rang de la Riviere Nord; Saint-Roch-de-l'Achigan QC	45°51′22″N 73°36′19″W	Quebec (9008)		More images
Maison J.-Oswald-Forest	1235, Rue Principale; Saint-Roch-de-l'Achigan QC	45°51′20″N 73°35′36″W	Quebec (11146)		More images
Maison Joséphat-Gareau	1484, Rue Principale; Saint-Roch-de-l'Achigan QC	45°51′21″N 73°36′12″W	Quebec (11293)		More images
Maison Marien	1154, Rue Principale; Saint-Roch-de-l'Achigan QC	45°51′21″N 73°35′27″W	Quebec (13299)		More images
Couvent	1224, Rue Principale; Saint-Roch-de-l'Achigan QC	45°51′21″N 73°35′29″W	Quebec (5647)		More images
Presbytère de Saint-Roch-de-l'Achigan	1188, Principale; Saint-Roch-de-l'Achigan QC	45°51′21″N 73°35′31″W	Federal (13337)		
Chapelle de procession Notre-Dame-de-Pitié	Saint-Sulpice QC	45°49′38″N 73°21′24″W	Quebec (7076)		
Église de Saint-Sulpice	Rue Notre-Dame; Saint-Sulpice QC	45°49′36″N 73°21′21″W	Quebec (14782)		
Bureau d'enregistrement de Sainte-Julienne	28, Rue Albert; Sainte-Julienne QC	45°57′49″N 73°42′58″W	Quebec (5633)		
Maison Jean-Baptiste-Simon-Allard	4471, Chemin Saint-Charles; Terrebonne QC	45°42′27″N 73°30′48″W	Quebec (5125)		
Maison Mathieu	3813, Boul. Saint-Charles; Terrebonne QC	45°42′04″N 73°32′11″W	Quebec (5650)		
Maison Bélisle	844, Rue Saint-Francois; Terrebonne QC	45°41′36″N 73°38′10″W	Quebec (4251)		Upload Photo
Maison Joseph-Augé	991, Rue Saint-Louis; Terrebonne QC	45°41′50″N 73°38′28″W	Quebec (4321)		
Maison Roussil	870, Rue Saint-Louis; Terrebonne QC	45°41′41″N 73°38′14″W	Quebec (4452)		
Site historique de l'Île-des-Moulins	900, Rue du Moulin; Terrebonne QC	45°41′34″N 73°38′18″W	Quebec (5282)		More images
Canadian National Railways Station	368-370 Champlain Street; Joliette QC	46°01′45″N 73°26′38″W	Federal (4626)		
Berthier Railway Station (Canadian Pacific) National Historic Site of Canada	481 Bayonne River Road South; Sainte-Geneviève-de-Berthier QC	46°05′50″N 73°16′28″W	Federal (7385)		Upload Photo

== See also ==
- List of National Historic Sites of Canada in Quebec
- List of historic places in Quebec City
- Répertoire du patrimoine culturel du Québec
