= Saint-Charles-de-Bourget =

- Municipality
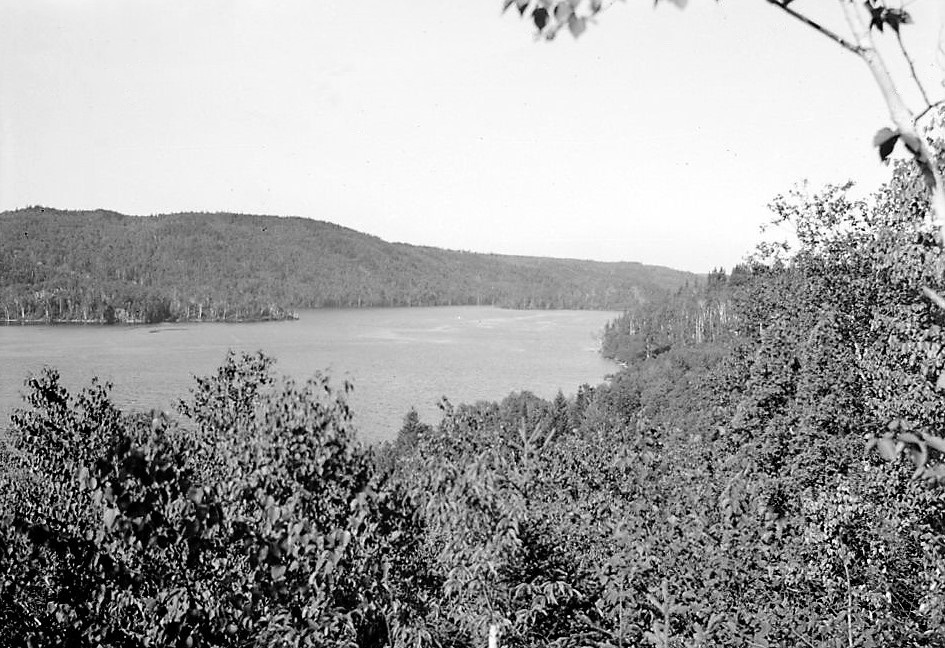

- Location in Saguenay–Lac-Saint-Jean Quebec.
- Coordinates: 48°34′N 71°22′W
- Country: Canada
- Province: Quebec
- Region: Saguenay–Lac-Saint-Jean
- RCM: Le Fjord-du-Saguenay
- Settled: 1864
- Constituted: September 29, 1885

Government
  - Mayor: Bernard St-Gelais
  - Federal riding: Jonquière—Hébertville—Pays-des-Bleuets
  - Prov. riding: Dubuc

Area
  - Total: 62.50 km^{2} (24.13 sq mi)
  - Land: 62.13 km^{2} (23.99 sq mi)

Population (2021)
  - Total: 784
  - Density: 12.6/km^{2} (33/sq mi)
  - Pop (2016–21): ▲6.5%
  - Dwellings: 383
- Time zone: UTC−5 (EST)
  - Summer (DST): UTC−4 (EDT)
- Postal code(s): G0V 1G0
- Area codes: 418 and 581
- Website: www.stcharlesdebourget.ca

Saint-Charles-de-Bourget (French pronunciation: [sɛ̃ ʃaʁl də buʁʒɛ]) is a municipality in Quebec, Canada.
