= List of historic places in Mauricie =

This is a list of historic places in Mauricie, Quebec, entered on the Canadian Register of Historic Places, whether they are federal, provincial, or municipal. All addresses are the administrative Region 04. For all other listings in the province of Quebec, see List of historic places in Quebec.

| Name | Address | Coordinates | Government recognition (CRHP №) | Wikidata ID | Image |
|---|---|---|---|---|---|
| Trois-Rivières Historical Complex National Historic Site of Canada | 834, 802, 732, 700, 811 and 787 des Ursulines Street; Trois-Rivières Invalid | 46°20′38″N 72°32′13″W | Federal (15071) | | More images |
| Site du patrimoine de l'usine de filtration de la Canadian International Paper | Trois-Rivières Invalid | 46°20′56″N 72°31′57″W | Invalid (15816) | | More images |
| Wabenaki Lodge | Lac-a-la-Peche Invalid | 46°47′29″N 72°58′11″W | Federal (15984) | | |
| Andrew Lodge | Lac-a-la-Peche Invalid | 46°47′29″N 72°58′11″W | Federal (15985) | | |
| Canadian National Railways/VIA Rail Station | 5 Latagne St. Clova Invalid | 48°06′36″N 75°21′32″W | Federal (4580) | | |
| Maison Nérée-Beauchemin | 711, rue Sainte-Anne; Yamachiche Invalid | 46°17′02″N 72°49′43″W | Invalid (4316) | | More images |
| Maison Rivard-Dit-Lanouette | 791, rue Sainte-Anne; Sainte-Anne-de-la-Perade Invalid | 46°34′05″N 72°11′42″W | Invalid (4319) | | More images |
| Maison Joseph-Louis-Léandre-Hamelin | 11, avenue Saint-Laurent Ouest; Louiseville Invalid | 46°15′21″N 72°56′23″W | Invalid (4329) | | More images |
| Église de Saint-Léon-le-Grand | Rue de la Fabrique, Saint-Leon-le-Grand; Saint-Leon-le-Grand Invalid | 46°18′49″N 72°56′07″W | Invalid (8421) | | More images |
| Site archéologique des Forges-Grondin | Chemin du Lac-des-Iles, Saint-Boniface; Saint-Boniface Invalid | 46°30′13″N 72°52′08″W | Invalid (15241) | | |
| Maison Louis-Léon-Lesieur-Desaulniers | 571, boulevard Sainte-Anne; Yamachiche Invalid | 46°16′57″N 72°49′51″W | Invalid (4320) | | More images |
| Caserne Patrick-Douville | 391, rue Principale; Saint-Adelphe Invalid | 46°44′07″N 72°26′01″W | Saint-Adelphe municipality (6218) | | |
| Site historique de l'Ancienne-Centrale-Hydroélectrique-de-Saint-Narcisse | Saint-Narcisse Invalid | 46°33′20″N 72°24′51″W | Invalid (6881) | | More images |
| Maison Dupont | 351, Rue Principale; Saint-Narcisse Invalid | 46°33′50″N 72°28′14″W | Saint-Narcisse municipality (8115) | | More images |
| Résidence du Bon-Pasteur | 982, Rue Notre-Dame; Champlain Invalid | 46°26′27″N 72°20′32″W | Champlain municipality (8832) | | More images |
| Calvaire Lacoursière | Rang Nord; Batiscan Invalid | 46°31′26″N 72°14′42″W | Batiscan municipality (8935) | | More images |
| Église de Notre-Dame-de-la-Visitation | Rue Notre-Dame; Champlain Invalid | 46°26′29″N 72°20′33″W | Invalid (9339) | | More images |
| Pont couvert de Saint-Mathieu | Chemin de la Terrasse-des-Chutes; Saint-Mathieu-du-Parc Invalid | 46°36′10″N 72°53′03″W | Saint-Mathieu-du-Parc municipality (9779) | | More images |
| L'Enfilade-de-Maisons-en-Brique-Rouge-de-Yamachiche | Yamachiche Invalid | 46°16′56″N 72°49′51″W | Invalid (10188) | | More images |
| Annexe de l'Ancienne-Centrale-Hydroélectrique-de-Saint-Narcisse | Saint-Narcisse Invalid | 46°33′20″N 72°24′51″W | Invalid (10414) | | More images |
| Calvaire de la Rivière-à-Veillet | 310, Chemin de la Riviere-a-Veillet; Sainte-Genevieve-de-Batiscan Invalid | 46°32′06″N 72°20′25″W | Sainte-Genevieve-de-Batiscan municipality (13235) | | |
| Manoir des Jésuites | 555, Rue Notre-Dame Est; Trois-Rivières Invalid | 46°22′05″N 72°29′59″W | Invalid (8277) | | More images |
| Moulin à vent de Trois-Rivières | 3351, boulevard des Forges; Trois-Rivières Invalid | 46°20′59″N 72°34′30″W | Invalid (1755) | | More images |
| Mausolée des évêques | Boulevard des Forges; Trois-Rivières Invalid | 46°21′09″N 72°34′31″W | Invalid (10997) | | |
| Mausolée des Évêques-de-Trois-Rivières | Boulevard des Forges; Trois-Rivières Invalid | 46°21′09″N 72°34′31″W | Invalid (13967) | | More images |
| Édifice Lampron | 1610, Sainte-Marie; Trois-Rivières Invalid | 46°20′32″N 72°33′00″W | Invalid (1417) | | More images |
| Maison Philippe-Verrette | 732, Rue Saint-Francois-Xavier; Trois-Rivières Invalid | 46°20′55″N 72°32′35″W | Invalid (1742) | | More images |
| Ancienne prison de Trois-Rivières | 842, Rue Saint-Pierre; Trois-Rivières Invalid | 46°20′42″N 72°32′21″W | Invalid (4076) | | More images |
| Maison Hertel-De La Fresnière | 802, Rue des Ursulines; Trois-Rivières Invalid | 46°20′37″N 72°32′12″W | Invalid (4318) | | More images |
| Place d'Armes | Rue des Ursulines; Trois-Rivières Invalid | 46°20′35″N 72°32′17″W | Invalid (5251) | | More images |
| Maison Georges-De Gannes | 834, rue des Ursulines; Trois-Rivières Invalid | 46°20′37″N 72°32′14″W | Invalid (5499) | | |
| Manoir Boucher-De Niverville | 168, Rue Bonaventure; Trois-Rivières Invalid | 46°20′37″N 72°32′24″W | Invalid (5505) | | More images |
| Cimetière Saint-James | rue Saint-Francois-Xavier; Trois-Rivières Invalid | 46°20′46″N 72°32′25″W | Invalid (6897) | | More images |
| Manoir de Tonnancour | 864, rue des Ursulines; Trois-Rivières Invalid | 46°20′35″N 72°32′18″W | Invalid (6983) | | More images |
| Arrondissement historique de Trois-Rivières | Trois-Rivières Invalid | 46°20′35″N 72°32′17″W | Invalid (9338) | | More images |
| Site historique des Récollets-de-Trois-Rivières | Rue des Ursulines; Trois-Rivières Invalid | 46°20′38″N 72°32′12″W | Invalid (11211) | | More images |
| Calvaire de Trois-Rivières-Ouest | rue Notre-Dame; Trois-Rivières Invalid | 46°18′20″N 72°35′27″W | Invalid (7202) | | More images |
| Moulin seigneurial de Tonnancour | 11930, Rue Notre-Dame Ouest; Trois-Rivières Invalid | 46°17′17″N 72°41′23″W | Invalid (8104) | | |
| Site historique du Moulin-Seigneurial-de-Tonnancour | Trois-Rivières Invalid | 46°17′17″N 72°41′23″W | Invalid (8105) | | More images |
| Chapelle funéraire Montour-Malhiot | Rue Notre-Dame Ouest; Trois-Rivières Invalid | 46°17′18″N 72°41′18″W | Invalid (12378) | | More images |
| Maison Dufresne | 2860, Rue du Fleuve; Trois-Rivières Invalid | 46°17′11″N 72°41′15″W | Invalid (12389) | | More images |
| Forges du Saint-Maurice National Historic Site of Canada | 10000 des Forges Boulevard; Trois-Rivières Invalid | 46°23′54″N 72°39′44″W | Federal (11709) | | More images |
| Site historique du Vieux-Presbytère-de-Batiscan | 340, Rue Principale; Batiscan Invalid | 46°28′56″N 72°15′30″W | Invalid (6604) | | More images |
| Poste d'incendie et de police Numéro-Deux-de-Shawinigan | 2023, avenue Champlain; Shawinigan Invalid | 46°33′15″N 72°44′37″W | Invalid (1744) | | |
| Former Shawinigan Aluminum Smelting Complex National Historic Site of Canada | 1 Erables Street; Shawinigan Invalid | 46°31′52″N 72°45′22″W | Federal (12043) | | More images |
| Church of Notre-Dame-de-la-Présentation National Historic Site of Canada | 835, 2nd Avenue; Shawinigan-Sud Invalid | 46°31′39″N 72°45′01″W | Federal (12766) | | More images |
| Auberge Grand-Mère | 10, 6e Avenue (Grand-Mere); Shawinigan Invalid | 46°37′13″N 72°40′51″W | Invalid (13260) | | Upload Photo |
| Brown Community Club | 29, rue Beckler; La Tuque Invalid | 47°26′32″N 72°47′20″W | Invalid (5779) | | Upload Photo |
| Ancien presbytère de Saint-Joseph-de-Maskinongé | 167 chemin du Pied-de-la-Cote; Maskinongé Invalid | 46°14′07″N 73°02′42″W | Invalid (1701) | | More images |
| Magasin général Le Brun | 192, rang du Pied-de-la-Cote; Maskinongé Invalid | 46°13′45″N 73°04′13″W | Invalid (5298) | | More images |
| Maison Doucet | 184 Chemin du Pied-de-la-Côte; Maskinongé Invalid | 46°13′54″N 73°03′52″W | Invalid (1730) | | |
| Canadian Pacific Railway Station | Mgr. Laflêche (corner of rue de la Fabrique); Sainte-Anne-de-la-Pérade Invalid | 46°34′35″N 72°12′12″W | Federal (6898) | | |
| Canadian National Railways Station | 1560 CN way Shawinigan Invalid | 46°32′58″N 72°44′45″W | Federal (4598) | | |
| Canadian Pacific Railway Station | Station Ave. Shawinigan Invalid | 46°32′43″N 72°45′03″W | Federal (4607) | | |
| Armoury | 574 St. Francois-Xavier; Trois-Rivières Invalid | 46°20′52″N 72°32′31″W | Federal (4351) | | |
| Fort Trois-Rivières National Historic Site of Canada | Rue des Casernes; Trois-Rivières Invalid | 46°20′31″N 72°32′17″W | Federal (18990) | | |
| VIA Rail Station (Trois-Rivieres) | 1075 Champflour Street; Trois-Rivières Invalid | 46°20′55″N 72°32′58″W | Federal (4518) | | |
| Pont Ducharme | Rue de l'Eglise; La Bostonnais QC | 47°31′20″N 72°41′00″W | Quebec (12000) | | More images |
