= List of historic places in Quebec =

This article is a list of historic places in the province of Quebec entered on the Canadian Register of Historic Places, whether they are federal, provincial, or municipal. All addresses are Quebec, Canada.

List of historic places by administrative regions:

- Region 01: List of historic places in Bas-Saint-Laurent
- Region 02: List of historic places in Saguenay-Lac-Saint-Jean
- Region 03: List of historic places in Capitale-Nationale
- Region 04: List of historic places in Mauricie
- Region 05: List of historic places in Estrie
- Region 06: List of historic places in Montréal
- Region 07: List of historic places in Outaouais
- Region 08: List of historic places in Abitibi-Témiscamingue
- Region 09: List of historic places in Côte-Nord
- Region 10: List of historic places in Nord-du-Québec
- Region 11: List of historic places in Gaspésie-Îles-de-la-Madeleine
- Region 12: List of historic places in Chaudière-Appalaches
- Region 13: List of historic places in Laval
- Region 14: List of historic places in Lanaudière
- Region 15: List of historic places in Laurentides
- Region 16: List of historic places in Montérégie
- Region 17: List of historic places in Centre-du-Québec

== See also ==
- List of National Historic Sites of Canada in Quebec
- List of historic places in Quebec City
- Répertoire du patrimoine culturel du Québec
