= List of historic places in Nord-du-Québec =

This article is a list of historic places in Nord-du-Québec, entered on the Canadian Register of Historic Places, whether they are federal, provincial, or municipal. All addresses are the administrative Region 10. For all other listings in the province of Quebec, see List of historic places in Quebec.

Name	Address	Coordinates	Government recognition (CRHP №)	Wikidata ID	Image
Waapushukamikw		51°04′08″N 72°54′14″W	Federal (12977), Quebec (9134)	Q23303435	Upload Photo

== See also ==
- List of historic places in Quebec
- List of National Historic Sites of Canada in Quebec
