= List of historic places in Outaouais =

This is a list of historic places in Outaouais, Quebec, entered on the Canadian Register of Historic Places, whether they are federal, provincial, or municipal. All addresses are the administrative Region 07. For all other listings in the province of Quebec, see List of historic places in Quebec.

Name	Address	Coordinates	Government recognition (CRHP №)	Wikidata ID	Image
Wood Shed	Gatineau Park; Chelsea QC	45°31′42″N 75°52′10″W	Federal (11468)		Upload Photo
Maison James-McConnell	567 Chemin d'Aylmer; Gatineau QC	45°23′56″N 75°48′38″W	Gatineau municipality (12392)		
McConnell House	1088 Chemin d'Aylmer; Gatineau QC	45°24′28″N 75°47′07″W	Federal (11396)		Upload Photo
Presbytère de Notre-Dame-de-la-Consolation	19, Rue Principale; Montpellier QC	45°51′21″N 75°09′44″W	Quebec (14824)		
Poste de traite du Lac-aux-Allumettes	Chemin Perrault; Sheenboro QC	45°57′07″N 77°16′15″W	Quebec (9807)		More images
Canadian Pacific Heritage Railway Station	Rue de la Gare; Masson-Angers QC	45°32′47″N 75°25′12″W	Federal (1184)		More images
Manoir Louis-Joseph-Papineau	Allee du Seigneur; Montebello QC	45°38′47″N 74°56′45″W	Federal (7639, (10231), Quebec (4469)		
Chapelle funéraire Louis-Joseph-Papineau	Allee du Seigneur; Montebello QC	45°38′53″N 74°56′39″W	Quebec (6875)		More images
Église Saint-John	Chemin de la Rouge; Papineauville QC	45°41′44″N 74°58′53″W	Quebec (9003)		
Croix de chemin	Chemin de la Rouge; Papineauville QC	45°40′29″N 75°00′04″W	Quebec (9116)		
Hôtel Petite-Nation	35, Rue Principale; Saint-André-Avellin QC	45°43′13″N 75°03′25″W	Quebec (13592)		
Ancien presbytère de Sainte-Angélique	294, Rue Papineau; Papineauville QC	45°37′04″N 75°01′08″W	Quebec (13883)		
Église de Sainte-Angélique	292, Rue Papineau; Papineauville QC	45°37′04″N 75°01′07″W	Quebec (14462)		
Maison George-Bryson	Route 148; Mansfield-et-Pontefract QC	45°51′50″N 76°44′27″W	Quebec (4248)		More images
Pont Félix-Gabriel-Marchand	Route 148; Mansfield-et-Pontefract QC	45°51′41″N 76°44′23″W	Quebec (4463)		More images
Tea Pavilion	Montebello QC	45°38′44″N 74°56′46″W	Federal (10213)		Upload Photo
Family Museum	Montebello QC	45°38′45″N 74°56′47″W	Federal (10215)		Upload Photo
Granary	Montebello QC	45°38′44″N 74°56′51″W	Federal (10232)		
Ensemble architectural de l'église et du presbytère de Notre-Dame-de-Bonsecours	Rue Notre-Dame; Montebello QC	45°39′02″N 74°56′23″W	Quebec (15336)		
Cimetière de Notre-Dame-de-Bonsecours	545, Rue Notre-Dame; Montebello QC	45°39′01″N 74°56′55″W	Quebec (16042)		
Bisson Centre	115 Bisson St. Gatineau QC	45°26′06″N 75°44′44″W	Federal (5987)		Upload Photo
Charron House	1 Laurier Road; Hull QC	45°26′03″N 75°42′27″W	Federal (11216)		
Maison Cosgrove	1521, Route 309; L'Ange-Gardien QC	45°37′26″N 75°26′35″W	Quebec (15444)		
Salaberry Armoury	188 Alexandre Tache Blvd. Gatineau QC	45°25′27″N 75°43′57″W	Federal (10857)		
Gilmour Hughson Lumber Co.	Gatineau QC	45°26′31″N 75°42′27″W	Federal (10859)		More images
Garage and Caretaker's Quarters	Gatineau Park; Chelsea QC	45°31′48″N 75°53′49″W	Federal (11207)		Upload Photo
O'Brien House	Chelsea QC	45°31′38″N 75°52′27″W	Federal (11242)		
Moorside, Garage with Servants' Quarters	Chelsea QC	45°28′59″N 75°50′49″W	Federal (11277)		
Moorside, Tool Shed	Gatineau Park; Chelsea QC	45°28′59″N 75°50′51″W	Federal (11278)		Upload Photo
Kingswood, Garage and Servants' Quarters	Gatineau Park; Chelsea QC	45°29′12″N 75°50′42″W	Federal (11279, (15791)		
Kingswood, Guest Cottage	Gatineau Park; Chelsea QC	45°29′12″N 75°50′45″W	Federal (11289)		
Moorside, Forge	Gatineau Park; Chelsea QC	45°29′02″N 75°50′50″W	Federal (11337)		
Moorside, Main House	Gatineau Park; Chelsea QC	45°29′01″N 75°50′52″W	Federal (11338)		
E.B. Eddy Digester Tower	Gatineau QC	45°25′42″N 75°42′29″W	Federal (11349)		
Prime Minister's Cottage	Chelsea QC	45°33′14″N 75°55′45″W	Federal (11352)		Upload Photo
Kingswood, Kingswood Cottage	Gatineau Park; Chelsea QC	45°29′10″N 75°50′51″W	Federal (11371)		
The Farm, Farm House	Gatineau Park; Chelsea QC	45°29′05″N 75°50′27″W	Federal (11372)		
National Printing Bureau and Heating Plant	45 Sacre Coeur Blvd. Gatineau QC	45°26′13″N 75°43′05″W	Federal (11375)		Upload Photo
Blocks 100-1100	241 Cite des Jeunes Blvd. Gatineau QC	45°27′05″N 75°45′40″W	Federal (12966)		Upload Photo
Blocks 2000-2700	241, Cite des Jeunes Blvd. Gatineau QC	45°27′05″N 75°45′40″W	Federal (12995)		Upload Photo
Herridge Chalet	Gatineau Park; QC	45°34′17″N 75°56′24″W	Federal (13219)		Upload Photo
Blocks 1200-1900	241, Cite des Jeunes Blvd. Gatineau QC	45°27′05″N 75°45′40″W	Federal (13293)		Upload Photo
Site du patrimoine d'Aylmer	Rue Principale; Gatineau QC	45°23′41″N 75°50′47″W	Quebec (15318)		
Cherry Cottage	67, Rue Broad; Gatineau QC	45°24′01″N 75°50′42″W	Quebec (15806)		
Main House	Chelsea QC	45°31′48″N 75°52′08″W	Federal (11467)		Upload Photo
Stable and Carriage House	Chelsea QC	45°31′44″N 75°52′09″W	Federal (11481)		Upload Photo
Chapel	Chelsea QC	45°31′44″N 75°52′09″W	Federal (11498)		Upload Photo
First Geodetic Survey Station National Historic Site of Canada	Chelsea QC	45°29′21″N 75°51′45″W	Federal (14823)		Upload Photo
Grist Mill	Mill Road; La Pêche QC	45°38′06″N 75°56′10″W	Federal (2972)		Upload Photo
MacLaren House	Mill Road; La Pêche QC	45°38′06″N 75°56′10″W	Federal (2973)		Upload Photo
Site du patrimoine du Quartier-du-Moulin	Rue Park; Gatineau QC	45°28′51″N 75°38′58″W	Quebec (6601)		
Site du patrimoine du Collège-Saint-Alexandre	Chemin des Erables; Gatineau QC	45°29′36″N 75°45′02″W	Quebec (6209)		
Hôtel Bank	14, Rue Eddy; Gatineau QC	45°25′31″N 75°43′12″W	Quebec (5119)		More images
Caserne d'incendie	239, Rue Champlain; Gatineau QC	45°26′00″N 75°42′41″W	Quebec (5121)		More images
Site du patrimoine Hanson-Taylor-Wright	Rue Hanson, Taylor et Wright; Gatineau QC	45°25′35″N 75°43′30″W	Quebec (5156)		
Site du patrimoine Kent-Aubry-Wright	Rue Aubry; Gatineau QC	45°25′38″N 75°42′59″W	Quebec (5157)		
Château d'eau	170, Rue Montcalm; Gatineau QC	45°25′47″N 75°43′36″W	Quebec (6880)		
Site du patrimoine du Portage	Promenade du Portage; Gatineau QC	45°25′31″N 75°43′05″W	Quebec (6884)		More images
Banque de Montréal	40, Promenade du Portage; Gatineau QC	45°25′30″N 75°43′11″W	Federal (11412), Quebec (7081)		More images
Hôtel Chez-Henri	179, Promenade du Portage; Gatineau QC	45°25′36″N 75°43′54″W	Quebec (1512)		More images
Maison Fairview	100, Boulevard Gamelin; Gatineau QC	45°26′39″N 75°44′25″W	Quebec (1754)		More images
Ferme Columbia	376, Boulevard Saint-Joseph; Gatineau QC	45°26′38″N 75°43′57″W	Federal (11331), Quebec (5120)		More images
Wright-Scott House	28 Alexandre Tache Blvd. Gatineau QC	45°25′29″N 75°43′33″W	Federal (13332), Quebec (6986)		
Site du patrimoine Jacques-Cartier	Gatineau QC	45°27′26″N 75°42′59″W	Quebec (7110)		More images
Maison Riverview	432, Boulevard Alexandre-Tache; Gatineau QC	45°25′19″N 75°44′56″W	Quebec (4317)		More images
Château Monsarrat	100, Rue du Chateau; Gatineau QC	45°25′12″N 75°45′37″W	Quebec (6506)		More images
Château Logue	8, Rue Comeau; Maniwaki QC	46°22′56″N 75°58′01″W	Quebec (13809)		
Auberge Charles-Symmes	2 Rue Main; Gatineau QC	45°23′40″N 75°51′18″W	Quebec (4194)		
Église Saint-Andrew	1, Chemin Eardley; Gatineau QC	45°23′45″N 75°50′43″W	Quebec (5254)		
Maison John-Ogilvie	36, Rue Court; Gatineau QC	45°23′39″N 75°50′42″W	Quebec (5295)		
Couvent Notre-Dame-de-la-Merci	53, Rue du Couvent; Gatineau QC	45°23′51″N 75°50′56″W	Quebec (5296)		
Chalet du Club-de-Golf-Rivermead	150, Chemin Rivermead; Gatineau QC	45°23′41″N 75°47′31″W	Quebec (5297)		Upload Photo
93, Rue Court	93, Rue Court; Gatineau QC	45°23′55″N 75°50′45″W	Quebec (6683)		
Maison MacKay-Wright	1210, Chemin d'Aylmer; Gatineau QC	45°24′38″N 75°46′31″W	Quebec (6693)		More images
Maison Samuel-Stewart	774 Chemin d'Aylmer; Gatineau QC	45°24′10″N 75°47′57″W	Gatineau municipality (8249)		
Maison Taker	3, Rue Cathcart; Gatineau QC	45°23′46″N 75°51′21″W	Quebec (6697)		
Maison Charles-Devlin	49, Rue Symmes; Gatineau QC	45°23′44″N 75°50′51″W	Quebec (6698)		
Maison William-Bourgeau	87, Rue du Patrimoine; Gatineau QC	45°23′39″N 75°50′41″W	Quebec (6868)		
Maison Peter-Aylen-Fils	63, Rue Bancroft; Gatineau QC	45°23′47″N 75°50′48″W	Quebec (6949)		
Maison John-Davis	23, Rue du Couvent; Gatineau QC	45°23′48″N 75°51′07″W	Quebec (6950)		
Maison James-Finlayson-Taylor	179, Chemin Eardley; Gatineau QC	45°24′24″N 75°51′53″W	Quebec (6951)		
Maison James-McArthur	79, Rue Front; Gatineau QC	45°24′01″N 75°51′19″W	Quebec (6952)		Upload Photo
Maison Conroy-McDonald	47, Rue Symmes; Gatineau QC	45°23′43″N 75°50′52″W	Quebec (7134)		
Maison Peter-Aylen-Père	108, Rue du Patrimoine; Gatineau QC	45°23′39″N 75°50′29″W	Quebec (7178)		
Maison Pierre-Renaud	67, Rue Denise-Friend; Gatineau QC	45°23′53″N 75°50′44″W	Quebec (7179)		
Maison Harvey-Parker-Fils	124, Chemin Eardley; Gatineau QC	45°24′14″N 75°51′28″W	Quebec (7258)		
Maison William-McLean	136, Chemin Eardley; Gatineau QC	45°24′17″N 75°51′32″W	Quebec (7259)		
Maison Richard-Cruice	47, Rue Denise-Friend; Gatineau QC	45°23′52″N 75°50′53″W	Quebec (8110)		
Maison John-Snow	890, Chemin d'Aylmer; Gatineau QC	45°24′18″N 75°47′33″W	Quebec (8112)		
19, Rue Thomas	19, Rue Thomas; Gatineau QC	45°23′46″N 75°51′07″W	Quebec (8154)		
Maison Peter-Howard-Church	100, Chemin Eardley; Gatineau QC	45°24′08″N 75°51′21″W	Quebec (8245)		
Maison John-Church	64, Rue Bancroft; Gatineau QC	45°23′46″N 75°50′48″W	Quebec (8247)		
Ancienne station de pompage d'Aylmer	2, Rue Raoul-Roy; Gatineau QC	45°23′50″N 75°51′31″W	Quebec (8988)		
Symmes Hotel National Historic Site of Canada	1 Front Street; Aylmer QC	45°23′40″N 75°51′17″W	Federal (9202)		More images
4, Rue Raoul-Roy	4, Rue Raoul-Roy; Gatineau QC	45°23′51″N 75°51′31″W	Quebec (12001)		
Hôtel Klondike	29, Rue du Couvent; Gatineau QC	45°23′48″N 75°51′05″W	Quebec (12368)		
Maison Joseph-Lebel	370, Chemin d'Aylmer; Gatineau QC	45°23′46″N 75°49′21″W	Quebec (12403)		
Maison Joseph-McGoey	416, Chemin d'Aylmer; Gatineau QC	45°23′46″N 75°49′09″W	Quebec (12430)		
Maison Thomas-MacKerall	1404b, Chemin d'Aylmer; Gatineau QC	45°24′53″N 75°45′54″W	Quebec (13112)		
Stymie Cottage	1404a, Chemin d'Aylmer; Gatineau QC	45°24′52″N 75°45′54″W	Quebec (13115)		
Presbytère de Saint-Paul	61, Rue du Couvent; Gatineau QC	45°23′49″N 75°50′40″W	Quebec (13236)		
Maison James-Coleman	10, Chemin Grimes; Gatineau QC	45°23′57″N 75°49′08″W	Quebec (1751), Gatineau municipality (8686)		
Maison Bolton-McGrath	580, Rue Boivert; Gatineau QC	45°26′53″N 75°52′38″W	Quebec (5294)		
Église Mountain View	1210, Chemin Vanier; Gatineau QC	45°26′42″N 75°49′12″W	Quebec (6599)		
Cimetière Edey	Chemin Lattion; Gatineau QC	45°24′29″N 75°52′16″W	Quebec (6600)		
Maison Delormey-Edey	35, Chemin Lattion; Gatineau QC	45°24′31″N 75°52′16″W	Quebec (6606)		
Maison Armstrong	893, Chemin d'Aylmer; Gatineau QC	45°24′19″N 75°47′34″W	Quebec (6692)		
Maison John-Foran	829, Chemin d'Aylmer; Gatineau QC	45°24′17″N 75°47′47″W	Quebec (6694)		
Maison Charles-Hurdman	651, Chemin d'Aylmer; Gatineau QC	45°24′03″N 75°48′20″W	Quebec (6699)		
Maison Henry-Marshall-Fulford	825, Chemin d'Aylmer; Gatineau QC	45°24′14″N 75°47′48″W	Quebec (7109)		
Radmore Estate	1021, Chemin de la Montagne; Gatineau QC	45°27′17″N 75°47′54″W	Quebec (7133)		Upload Photo
Maison Richard-McConnell	579, Chemin d'Aylmer; Gatineau QC	45°24′03″N 75°48′20″W	Quebec (7180)		
Maison Simon-Hill	199, Chemin Klock; Gatineau QC	45°24′41″N 75°51′12″W	Quebec (7260)		
Ancienne église méthodiste d'Aylmer	495, Chemin d'Aylmer; Gatineau QC	45°23′53″N 75°48′50″W	Quebec (8117)		
485, Chemin d'Aylmer	485, Chemin d'Aylmer; Gatineau QC	45°23′52″N 75°48′53″W	Quebec (12365)		Upload Photo
Ancienne église méthodiste d'Aylmer	495, Chemin d'Aylmer; Gatineau QC	45°23′53″N 75°48′50″W	Quebec (13055)		
Maison J.-J.-Roney	66 Rue Bancroft; Gatineau QC	45°23′47″N 75°50′48″W	Gatineau municipality (10184)		
Scott House	100 Gamelin Boulevard; Gatineau QC	45°26′37″N 75°44′22″W	Federal (11394)		Upload Photo
Stable	670 Alexander Taché Boulevard; Gatineau QC	45°25′20″N 75°45′27″W	Federal (10947)		
Croix de chemin	Cote Saint-Charles; Papineauville QC	45°37′02″N 75°03′35″W	Papineauville municipality (9117)		
Cimetière protestant	Route 148; Papineauville QC	45°37′15″N 74°59′53″W	Papineauville municipality (11981)		
Croix de chemin	Montée Chartrand; Plaisance QC	45°35′59″N 75°01′43″W	Plaisance municipality (9118)		
