= List of historic places in Laurentides =

This is a list of historic places in Laurentides, entered on the Canadian Register of Historic Places, whether they are federal, provincial, or municipal. All addresses are the administrative Region 15. For all other listings in the province of Quebec, see List of historic places in Quebec.

Name	Address	Coordinates	Government recognition (CRHP №)	Wikidata ID	Image
Calvaire d'Oka	Oka QC	45°28′55″N 74°03′54″W	Quebec (4863)		More images
Cathédrale de Saint-Jérôme	Place du Cure-Labelle; Saint-Jérôme QC	45°46′41″N 74°00′09″W	Quebec (15152)		More images
Grange-écurie des Prêtres-Chaumont	163, Boulevard Sainte-Anne; Sainte-Anne-des-Plaines QC	45°45′40″N 73°48′52″W	Quebec (5222)		More images
Maison des Prêtres-Chaumont	163, Boulevard Sainte-Anne; Sainte-Anne-des-Plaines QC	45°45′39″N 73°48′51″W	Quebec (5492)		Upload Photo
Cimetière de Sainte-Anne-des-Plaines	129, Boulevard Sainte-Anne; Sainte-Anne-des-Plaines QC	45°45′36″N 73°49′00″W	Quebec (8414)		More images
Ancien couvent de Sainte-Anne-des-Plaines	139, Boulevard Sainte-Anne; Sainte-Anne-des-Plaines QC	45°45′36″N 73°48′56″W	Quebec (8415)		More images
Presbytère de Sainte-Anne-des-Plaines	129, Boulevard Sainte-Anne; Sainte-Anne-des-Plaines QC	45°45′34″N 73°48′56″W	Quebec (8968)		More images
Maison Joseph-Thibodeau	757, Rue Principale; Piedmont QC	45°54′08″N 74°08′17″W	Quebec (4851)		Upload Photo
Gare ferroviaire de Saint-Faustin-Station	Allee du 7e Mont-Blanc QC	46°07′46″N 74°28′17″W	Quebec (9846)		Upload Photo
Maison Adolphe-Basile-Routhier	3320, Route 344; Saint-Placide QC	45°31′40″N 74°13′04″W	Quebec (5118)		
Maison Barclay	36, Rue Principale; Saint-André-d'Argenteuil QC	45°33′55″N 74°22′22″W	Quebec (5124)		More images
Carillon Barracks National Historic Site of Canada	50 Principale Street; Carillon QC	45°34′07″N 74°22′35″W	Federal (11123, (7406)		More images
Carillon Canal National Historic Site of Canada	210 du Barrage Street; Carillon QC	45°34′06″N 74°22′41″W	Federal (11676)		More images
Secteur Basile-Routhier	Route 344; Saint-Placide QC	45°31′34″N 74°13′23″W	Quebec (13478)		Upload Photo
Maison Garth	100, Grande-Cote; Lorraine QC	45°39′15″N 73°46′21″W	Quebec (6980)		More images
Chapelle du cimetière de Saint-Jérôme	Rue John-F.-Kennedy; Saint-Jérôme QC	45°46′38″N 74°01′38″W	Quebec (8947)		More images
Maison Prévost	349, Rue Labelle; Saint-Jérôme QC	45°46′39″N 74°00′14″W	Quebec (3480)		Upload Photo
Ancien palais de justice de Saint-Jérôme	101, Place du Cure-Labelle; Saint-Jérôme QC	45°46′43″N 74°00′12″W	Quebec (5639), Saint-Jérôme municipality (8936)		
Gare de Saint-Jérôme	100, Place de la Gare; Saint-Jérôme QC	45°46′36″N 74°00′02″W	Federal (7095), Quebec (8938)		Upload Photo
Hôtel de ville de Saint-Jérôme	280, Rue Labelle; Saint-Jérôme QC	45°46′32″N 74°00′16″W	Quebec (8939)		Upload Photo
Presbytère de Saint-Jérôme	355, Place du Cure-Labelle; Saint-Jérôme QC	45°46′39″N 74°00′10″W	Quebec (11175)		Upload Photo
Charnier de Sainte-Agathe	37, Rue Principale Est; Sainte-Agathe-des-Monts QC	46°02′45″N 74°17′07″W	Quebec (8986)		Upload Photo
Église de Sainte-Agathe	Rue Principale Est; Sainte-Agathe-des-Monts QC	46°02′45″N 74°17′06″W	Quebec (9020)		More images
Presbytère de Sainte-Agathe	37, Rue Principale Est; Sainte-Agathe-des-Monts QC	46°02′48″N 74°17′09″W	Quebec (14416)		
Site du patrimoine Beattie-des-Pins	Rue Beattie; Mont-Tremblant QC	46°07′44″N 74°35′24″W	Quebec (11250)		
Chapelle Saint-Bernard	Mont-Tremblant QC	46°12′38″N 74°35′16″W	Quebec (13268)		
Gare de Lachute	540, Rue Berry; Lachute QC	45°39′22″N 74°20′01″W	Federal (6720), Quebec (8140)		
Édifice centenaire de la municipalité régionale de comté d'Argenteuil	430, Rue Grace; Lachute QC	45°39′13″N 74°20′10″W	Quebec (8278)		More images
Maison Alix-Bail	434, Rue du Portage; Mont-Laurier QC	46°33′19″N 75°30′02″W	Quebec (8114)		Upload Photo
Ponts de Ferme-Rouge - Pont Est	Chemin de Kiamika; Kiamika QC	46°25′35″N 75°25′43″W	Quebec (8889)		More images
Ponts de Ferme-Rouge - Pont Ouest	Chemin de Kiamika; Kiamika QC	46°25′35″N 75°25′44″W	Quebec (8890)		
Superintendent's Residence	Carillon QC	45°34′00″N 74°22′31″W	Federal (11010)		Upload Photo
Collector's House	Saint-André-d'Argenteuil QC	45°34′01″N 74°22′35″W	Federal (11049)		More images
Site du patrimoine de Saint-Sauveur-des-Monts	Rue Principale; Saint-Sauveur QC	45°53′43″N 74°09′26″W	Quebec (15285)		
Site du patrimoine d'Oka	Oka QC	45°27′32″N 74°05′23″W	Quebec (15484)		
Église de Sainte-Anne-des-Plaines	Boulevard Sainte-Anne; Sainte-Anne-des-Plaines QC	45°45′34″N 73°48′58″W	Quebec (15236)		
Maison du patrimoine	17, Rue du Canal Nord; Grenville QC	45°37′35″N 74°36′19″W	Quebec (15188)		
Maison Hamilton	106, Chemin de la Grande-Cote; Rosemère QC	45°37′21″N 73°48′09″W	Quebec (10882)		Upload Photo
Manoir Bleury-Bouthillier	90, Chemin de la Grande-Cote; Rosemère QC	45°37′17″N 73°48′09″W	Quebec (10886)		
Domaine Louis-Philippe-Hébert	463, Rue de l'Ile-Belair Ouest; Rosemère QC	45°37′10″N 73°47′51″W	Quebec (11138)		Upload Photo
Maison Twin Chimney	Rosemère QC	45°38′32″N 73°47′05″W	Quebec (13482)		
Maison Hubert-Maisonneuve	369, Chemin de la Grande-Cote; Rosemère QC	45°38′16″N 73°47′25″W	Quebec (13633)		
Ancien séminaire de Sainte-Thérèse	Rue Saint-Louis; Sainte-Thérèse QC	45°38′30″N 73°50′35″W	Quebec (7152)		More images
Église Sainte-Thérèse-de-Blainville	Rue de l'Eglise; Sainte-Thérèse QC	45°38′25″N 73°50′39″W	Quebec (10323)		More images
Presbytère de Sainte-Thérèse-de-Blainville	10, Rue de l'Eglise; Sainte-Thérèse QC	45°38′27″N 73°50′39″W	Quebec (10324)		Upload Photo
Maison Abraham-Dubois	331, Boulevard de la Grande-Allee; Boisbriand QC	45°36′33″N 73°49′56″W	Quebec (9638)		More images
Maison Léon-Dion	394, Chemin de la Grande-Cote; Boisbriand QC	45°36′23″N 73°50′02″W	Quebec (11172)		
Maison Jean-Joseph-Girouard	3905, Rue Saint-Jean-Baptiste; Mirabel QC	45°34′08″N 74°05′52″W	Quebec (5126)		More images
Domaine et manoir de Belle-Rivière	8106, Rue Belle-Riviere; Mirabel QC	45°37′35″N 74°05′31″W	Quebec (5286)		More images
Moulin Légaré	232, Rue Saint-Eustache; Saint-Eustache QC	45°33′29″N 73°53′46″W	Federal (12429), Quebec (4455)		More images
Maison Chénier-Sauvé	83 Rue Chenier; Saint-Eustache QC	45°33′20″N 73°53′23″W	Quebec (10943)		
Domaine Globensky	235, Rue Saint-Eustache; Saint-Eustache QC	45°33′31″N 73°53′45″W	Quebec (4937)		More images
Église de Saint-Eustache	123, Rue Saint-Louis; Saint-Eustache QC	45°33′24″N 73°53′18″W	Quebec (7681)		More images
Maison Lavigne-Richer	275, Rue Saint-Eustache; Saint-Eustache QC	45°33′30″N 73°53′51″W	Quebec (10942)		
Mairie de Saint-Eustache	145, Rue Saint-Louis; Saint-Eustache QC	45°33′27″N 73°53′20″W	Quebec (10944)		More images
Ancienne église presbytérienne de Saint-Eustache	Rue Saint-Eustache; Saint-Eustache QC	45°33′30″N 73°53′50″W	Quebec (10945)		
Site du patrimoine de la Maison-Dumoulin	2501, Chemin d'Oka; Deux-Montagnes QC	45°32′00″N 73°54′22″W	Quebec (11198)		
Site du patrimoine de l'hôtel de ville	803, Chemin d'Oka; Deux-Montagnes QC	45°32′30″N 73°53′34″W	Quebec (11201)		
Site du patrimoine de la Petite-École-Jaune	1304, Chemin d'Oka; Deux-Montagnes QC	45°32′17″N 73°53′47″W	Quebec (11294)		
Petite école jaune	1304, Chemin d'Oka; Deux-Montagnes QC	45°32′17″N 73°53′47″W	Quebec (11295)		
Site du patrimoine de la Maison-Bélair	201, Chemin d'Oka; Deux-Montagnes QC	45°32′46″N 73°53′28″W	Quebec (11428)		
Site du patrimoine de la Maison-Baudouin	91, 24e Avenue; Deux-Montagnes QC	45°31′53″N 73°54′06″W	Quebec (13249)		
Site du patrimoine de la Maison-Berthelet	1506, Chemin d'Oka; Deux-Montagnes QC	45°32′13″N 73°53′54″W	Quebec (13250)		
Canadian Pacific Railway Station	Main Street; L'Annonciation QC	46°24′53″N 74°52′15″W	Federal (6546)		
Canadian Pacific Railway Station	700 Vaudreuil Road; Mont-Laurier QC	46°33′25″N 75°29′27″W	Federal (6545)		
Église Christ Church	Route du Long-Sault; Saint-Andre-d'Argenteuil QC	45°33′40″N 74°20′23″W	Quebec (10528)		
Ancien bureau de poste	83 Rue Saint-Vincent; Sainte-Agathe-des-Monts QC	46°02′56″N 74°17′18″W	Sainte-Agathe-des-Monts municipality (8969)		
Canadian Pacific Railway Station	24 Rue St. Paul Est; Sainte-Agathe-des-Monts QC	46°03′06″N 74°16′57″W	Federal (7098)		
