= List of historic places in Centre-du-Québec =

This article is a list of historic places in Centre-du-Québec, entered on the Canadian Register of Historic Places, whether they are federal, provincial, or municipal. All addresses are the administrative Region 17. For all other listings in the province of Quebec, see List of historic places in Quebec.

Name	Address	Coordinates	Government recognition (CRHP №)	Wikidata ID	Image
Ancien presbytère de Saint-Edmond-de-Grantham	1393, Rue Notre-Dame-de-Lourdes; Saint-Edmond-de-Grantham QC	45°52′54″N 72°40′34″W	Quebec (13975)		
Église anglicane Saint-Paul	Chemin des Domaines; Saint-Félix-de-Kingsey QC	45°47′54″N 72°13′28″W	Quebec (15339)		
Maison d'école du rang Cinq-Chicots	416, Avenue Pie X Saint-Christophe-d'Arthabaska QC	46°01′49″N 71°55′57″W	Quebec (4732)		More images
Wilfrid Laurier House National Historic Site of Canada	16 Laurier Street West; Victoriaville QC	46°02′16″N 71°54′56″W	Federal (9554), Quebec (3611)		More images
Maison Marc-Aurèle-De Foy-Suzor-Coté	846 Boulevard des Bois-Francs Sud; Victoriaville QC	46°02′27″N 71°55′11″W	Quebec (5039), Victoriaville municipality (8533)		
Église de Saint-Christophe	Rue Laurier Ouest; Victoriaville QC	46°02′02″N 71°54′58″W	Quebec (10164)		More images
Site du patrimoine de l'Église-Sainte-Victoire	Rue Notre-Dame Ouest; Victoriaville QC	46°03′24″N 71°57′43″W	Quebec (10887)		More images
Site du patrimoine de l'Église-Saint-Christophe-d'Arthabaska	Rue Laurier Ouest; Victoriaville QC	46°02′02″N 71°54′58″W	Quebec (10888)		More images
Église de Saint-Cyrille	4425, Rue Principale; Saint-Cyrille-de-Wendover QC	45°56′02″N 72°25′26″W	Quebec (11203)		More images
Presbytère de Saint-Cyrille	34, Rue Saint-Louis; Saint-Cyrille-de-Wendover QC	45°56′02″N 72°25′26″W	Quebec (13632)		
Grange-écurie	4425 Rue Principale; Saint-Cyrille-de-Wendover QC	45°56′02″N 72°25′24″W	Saint-Cyrille-de-Wendover municipality (11206)		
Maison du sacristain	4435 Rue Principale; Saint-Cyrille-de-Wendover QC	45°56′03″N 72°25′23″W	Saint-Cyrille-de-Wendover municipality (13810)		
Charnier	4425, Rue Principale; Saint-Cyrille-de-Wendover QC	45°56′02″N 72°25′27″W	Quebec (16041)		
Maison Cormier	1353, Rue Saint-Calixte; Plessisville QC	46°12′57″N 71°46′39″W	Quebec (8113)		
Pont couvert de Warwick	28, Route Saint-Albert; Warwick QC	45°57′22″N 72°00′24″W	Quebec (11353)		More images
Église de Saint-Grégoire-le-Grand	Boulevard de Port-Royal; Bécancour QC	46°16′18″N 72°30′42″W	Quebec (9468)		More images
Église de Saint-Édouard	675, Boulevard Becancour; Bécancour QC	46°24′10″N 72°16′29″W	Quebec (12398)		
Moulin Michel	675, Boulevard Becancour; Bécancour QC	46°24′46″N 72°14′50″W	Quebec (7679)		More images
Maison Trent	875, Chemin de la Riviere-Est; Saint-Charles-de-Drummond QC	45°54′36″N 72°29′30″W	Quebec (6675)		More images
Maison Joseph-Wilfrid-Faucher	441, Rue Lindsay; Drummondville QC	45°52′49″N 72°29′00″W	Quebec (6893)		More images
Ancien hôpital Sainte-Croix	255, Rue Brock; Drummondville QC	45°53′01″N 72°29′15″W	Quebec (7021)		
Gare C.N. de Drummondville	263, Rue Lindsay; Drummondville QC	45°52′55″N 72°29′17″W	Quebec (7080)		More images
Manufacture Dominion-Silk-Dyeing-and-Printing	416, Rue Heriot; Drummondville QC	45°53′02″N 72°28′52″W	Quebec (7389)		
École Saint-Frédéric	457, Rue des Ecoles; Drummondville QC	45°52′45″N 72°29′02″W	Quebec (7712)		
Centrale hydroélectrique Hemming	1235, Chemin Hemming; Drummondville QC	45°53′01″N 72°28′52″W	Quebec (9461)		More images
Carré Celanese	1, Carre Celanese; Drummondville QC	45°52′18″N 72°28′43″W	Quebec (13129)		
Poste de transmission Marconi	1425, Rue des Trois-Maisons; Drummondville QC	45°51′17″N 72°28′14″W	Quebec (13974)		
Maison Joseph-Trefflé-Caya	209, Rue Brock; Drummondville QC	45°53′05″N 72°29′23″W	Quebec (6867)		More images
Maison et écurie William-Mitchell	131, Rue Saint-Georges; Drummondville QC	45°53′11″N 72°29′38″W	Quebec (6900)		
Cinéma Capitol	253, Rue Lindsay; Drummondville QC	45°52′59″N 72°29′18″W	Quebec (7022)		More images
Centrale hydroélectrique de Drummondville	25, Rue du Pont; Drummondville QC	45°53′10″N 72°29′00″W	Quebec (7283)		More images
Banque de Montréal	221, Rue Heriot; Drummondville QC	45°53′07″N 72°29′21″W	Quebec (7372)		
Pensionnat de Drummondville	235, Rue Moisan; Drummondville QC	45°52′57″N 72°29′27″W	Quebec (7388)		
Église St.George	276, Rue Heriot; Drummondville QC	45°53′03″N 72°29′12″W	Quebec (7907)		More images
Site du patrimoine du Parc-Saint-Frédéric	219-227, Rue Brock; Drummondville QC	45°53′03″N 72°29′17″W	Quebec (13297)		More images
Académie d'Inverness	330 Chemin Gosford Sud; Inverness QC	46°15′33″N 71°31′22″W	Inverness municipality (11202)		
Édifice municipal	106 Rue Saint-Jean-Baptiste; Saint-Guillaume QC	45°52′56″N 72°45′58″W	Saint-Guillaume municipality (11991)		

== See also ==
- List of historic places in Quebec
- List of National Historic Sites of Canada in Quebec
