= List of historic places in Côte-Nord =

This article is a list of historic places in Côte-Nord, entered on the Canadian Register of Historic Places, whether they are federal, provincial, or municipal. All addresses are the administrative Region 09. For all other listings in the province of Quebec, see List of historic places in Quebec.

Name	Address	Coordinates	Government recognition (CRHP №)	Wikidata ID	Image
Chapelle de Tadoussac	Rue du Bord-de-l'Eau; Tadoussac QC	48°08′30″N 69°42′55″W	Quebec (12432)		More images
Wreck of the Elizabeth and Mary National Historic Site of Canada	L'Anse-aux-Bouleaux; Baie-Trinité QC	49°23′00″N 67°18′57″W	Federal (15926)		Upload Photo
Église de Sainte-Amélie	37, Avenue Marquette; Baie-Comeau QC	49°13′09″N 68°08′51″W	Quebec (13799)		More images
La Petite Anglicane de Forestville	2e Rue; Forestville QC	48°44′14″N 69°04′13″W	Forestville municipality (8493)		Upload Photo
Site du patrimoine de Sacré-Coeur	Sacre-Coeur QC	48°13′58″N 69°48′06″W	Sacre-Coeur municipality (10334)		More images
Site archéologique des Basques-de-l'Anse-à-la-Cave	Les Bergeronnes QC	48°17′07″N 69°26′00″W	Quebec (12464)		Upload Photo
Sites archéologiques de la Pointe-à-John	Rue de la Mer; Les Bergeronnes QC	48°13′46″N 69°33′02″W	Quebec (12932)		
Église de Sainte-Anne	Rue de Monseigneur-Bouchard; Portneuf-sur-Mer QC	48°37′04″N 69°06′01″W	Portneuf-sur-Mer municipality (13255)		
Arboriduc	Forestville QC	48°44′21″N 69°03′37″W	Forestville municipality (14411)		
Maison Johan-Beetz	Route 138; Baie-Johan-Beetz QC	50°17′20″N 62°48′21″W	Quebec (9371)		More images
Arrondissement naturel de l'Archipel-de-Mingan	Havre-Saint-Pierre QC	50°12′10″N 63°28′47″W	Quebec (10225)		
Église Sainte-Anne de l'île Providence	Cote-Nord-du-Golfe-du-Saint-Laurent QC	50°37′01″N 59°13′41″W	Cote-Nord-du-Golfe-du-Saint-Laurent municipality (11976)		Upload Photo
Site historique des Galets	Natashquan QC	50°10′54″N 61°49′24″W	Quebec (12391)		
Site historique de Room's Point	Blanc-Sablon QC	51°25′29″N 57°08′17″W	Quebec (12442)		
Four à chaux de Baie-Sainte-Claire	L'Ile-d'Anticosti QC	49°53′53″N 64°29′32″W	Quebec (13057)		Upload Photo
Site archéologique de l'Île-au-Bois	Blanc-Sablon QC	51°23′57″N 57°09′16″W	Quebec (13396)		
Blanc-Sablon National Historic Site of Canada	Blanc-Sablon QC	51°25′39″N 57°08′00″W	Federal (15814), Quebec (13434)		More images
Site archéologique du Poste-de-Nétagamiou	Cote-Nord-du-Golfe-du-Saint-Laurent QC	50°28′47″N 59°35′13″W	Quebec (13805)		Upload Photo
Phare de Pointe-des-Monts	Baie-Trinite QC	49°19′32″N 67°22′00″W	Quebec (9366)		More images
Corossol	Sept-Îles QC	50°05′37″N 66°23′29″W	Federal (15957)		Upload Photo
Light Tower	Central south coast of Anticosti Isle; Bagot Bluff QC	49°23′29″N 63°35′42″W	Federal (10890)		Upload Photo
Light Tower	Northeast coast of Anticosti Isle; Cap de la Table QC	49°21′03″N 61°53′47″W	Federal (10949)		Upload Photo
Light Tower	Northwest coast of Anticosti Isle; Cap de Rabast QC	49°57′05″N 64°09′00″W	Federal (10948)		Upload Photo
Light Tower	North central coast of Anticosti Isle; Cap de Rabast QC	49°43′52″N 62°56′33″W	Federal (10893)		Upload Photo
Île aux Perroquets Lighthouse	Western end of the Mingan Islands Archipelago; Longue-Pointe-de-Mingan QC	50°13′14″N 64°12′23″W	Federal (20714)		
Haut-Fond-Prince Lighttower	On a caisson in the Saint Lawrence River; Tadoussac QC	48°07′26″N 69°40′16″W	Federal (21069)		

== See also ==
- List of historic places in Quebec
