= List of historic places in Laval =

This article is a list of historic places in Laval, entered on the Canadian Register of Historic Places, whether they are federal, provincial, or municipal. All addresses are in the administrative Region 13. For all other listings in the province of Quebec, see List of historic places in Quebec.

Name	Address	Coordinates	Government recognition (CRHP №)	Wikidata ID	Image
Maison Charbonneau (also known as Maison Pierre-Thibault)	8740, boulevard des Mille-Îles; Laval QC	45°41′36″N 73°34′45″W	Quebec (7032)		
Maison Therrien	9770, boulevard des Mille-Îles; Laval QC	45°41′56″N 73°33′28″W	Quebec (7028)		
Towers (Saint-Vincent-de-Paul Penitentiary)	160, Montée Saint-François; Laval QC	45°37′02″N 73°38′50″W	Federal (11042)		
Main Cellblock (Saint-Vincent-de-Paul Penitentiary)	160, Montée Saint-François; Laval QC	45°37′04″N 73°38′45″W	Federal (11094)		
Saint-Vincent-de-Paul Penitentiary (National Historic Site)	160, Montée Saint-François; Laval QC	45°37′04″N 73°38′45″W	Federal (12742)		
Maison Pierre-Paré	4730, Rang du Haut-Saint-François; Laval QC	45°38′13″N 73°40′12″W	Quebec (8078)		
Maison Joseph-Labelle	570, boulevard des Mille-Îles; Laval QC	45°39′46″N 73°44′25″W	Quebec (7033)		
Église de Sainte-Rose-de-Lima	219, boulevard Sainte-Rose Est; Laval QC	45°36′50″N 73°47′14″W	Quebec (10548)		
Maison André-Benjamin-Papineau	5475, boulevard Saint-Martin Ouest; Laval QC	45°32′26″N 73°47′30″W	Quebec (6931)		
