= List of historic places in Saguenay-Lac-Saint-Jean =

This is a list of historic places in Saguenay-Lac-Saint-Jean, Quebec, entered on the Canadian Register of Historic Places, whether they are federal, provincial, or municipal. All addresses are the administrative Region 02. For all other listings in the province of Quebec, see List of historic places in Quebec.

Name	Address	Coordinates	Government recognition (CRHP №)	Wikidata ID	Image
Site archéologique du Poste-de-Traite-de-l'Ashuapmushuan	Lac-Ashuapmushuan; Le Domaine-du-Roy Regional County Municipality QC	49°11′48″N 73°47′09″W	Quebec (15243)		Upload Photo
Maison Gertrude-McLeod	679, Rue Racine Est; Saguenay QC	48°25′47″N 71°02′52″W	Quebec (15742)		
Maison Françoise-Simard	1722, Chemin Saint-Joseph; Saguenay QC	48°21′46″N 70°52′28″W	Quebec (16206)		More images
Alert Hangar National Historic Site of Canada	CFB Bagotville; La Baie QC	48°20′05″N 70°58′19″W	Federal (15801, (13901)		
B88/Former Control Tower	CFB Bagotville; La Baie QC	48°20′03″N 70°59′22″W	Federal (16525)		Upload Photo
Hangar 6	6 Edmonton Street, CFB Bagotville; La Baie QC	48°20′05″N 70°59′11″W	Federal (12981)		Upload Photo
Site du patrimoine du Bassin	Roughly bounded by rues Bossé and Sainte-Marthe, and by the Chicoutimi River; Saguenay QC	48°25′30″N 71°04′32″W	Quebec (15607)		
VIA Rail Station	15, Saint Louis Street; Hébertville QC	48°26′37″N 71°39′43″W	Federal (3676)		More images
Ancien moulin de Sainte-Jeanne-d'Arc	205 rue du Vieux-Moulin; Sainte-Jeanne-d'Arc QC	48°51′52″N 72°04′58″W	Quebec (4177)		More images
Poudrière du Poste-de-Traite-de-la-Métabetchouane	Route 169; Desbiens QC	48°25′12″N 71°57′48″W	Quebec (4865)		More images
Village historique de Val-Jalbert	Rue Saint-Georges; Chambord QC	48°26′16″N 72°09′59″W	Quebec (5503)		More images
Calvaire de Saint-Augustin	In the Saint-Augustin parish cemetery Saint-Augustin QC	48°48′15″N 71°56′39″W	Saint-Augustin municipality (13162)		Upload Photo
Site archéologique de la Métabetchouane	Route 169; Chambord QC	48°25′20″N 71°58′14″W	Quebec (13433)		
162, rue de la Gare	162, Rue de la Gare; Chambord QC	48°25′19″N 72°03′32″W	Chambord municipality (13712)		
Maison Laurent-Létourneau	1498, Rue Principale; Chambord QC	48°25′47″N 72°03′38″W	Chambord municipality (13735)		
Auberge Saint-Louis	158, Rue de la Gare; Chambord QC	48°25′19″N 72°03′32″W	Chambord municipality (13807)		Upload Photo
819, route de la Pointe	819, Route de la Pointe; Chambord QC	48°27′46″N 72°05′15″W	Chambord municipality (13808)		Upload Photo
Maison Samuel-Bédard	700, boulevard Maria-Chapdelaine; Peribonka QC	48°44′28″N 71°59′10″W	Quebec (6895)		More images
Place des Ormes	Route du Village; Saint-Charles-de-Bourget QC	48°29′32″N 71°24′28″W	Saint-Charles-de-Bourget municipality (12021)		Upload Photo
Église de Péribonka	Rue Edouard-Niquet; Peribonka QC	48°45′56″N 72°02′09″W	Quebec (10643)		
Chapelle Saint-Antoine-de-Padoue	Route de l'Ermitage; Lac-Bouchette QC	48°16′26″N 72°11′26″W	Quebec (12105)		Upload Photo
Old Chicoutimi Pulp Mill National Historic Site of Canada	300 Dubuc Street; Chicoutimi QC	48°25′23″N 71°04′42″W	Federal (15903), Quebec (5504)		More images
Site du patrimoine de l'Ancienne-Académie-Saint-Alphonse-de-Bagotville	425, Boulevard de la Grande-Baie Nord; Saguenay QC	48°20′27″N 70°53′04″W	Quebec (8125)		Upload Photo
Site du patrimoine de la Côte-de-la-Fabrique-de-Bagotville	410-458, Boulevard de la Grande-Baie Sud; Saguenay QC	48°20′24″N 70°52′58″W	Quebec (8127)		Upload Photo
Site du patrimoine du Noyau-Institutionnel-de-Saint-Alphonse-de-Bagotville	Roughly bounded by rue Albert, rue Victoria, rue de la Fabrique and the site du patrimoine du Vieux-Bagotville; Saguenay QC	48°20′28″N 70°52′51″W	Quebec (8128)		More images
Site du patrimoine du Vieux-Bagotville (secteur Albert/Bagot)	803-915, Rue de la Fabrique (La Baie); Saguenay QC	48°20′21″N 70°52′47″W	Quebec (8130)		Upload Photo
Site du patrimoine du Noyau-Institutionnel-de-Saint-Marc-de-Bagotville	1652, Rue Saint-Marc; Saguenay QC	48°20′16″N 70°53′24″W	Quebec (8301)		Upload Photo
5283, chemin Saint-Martin	5283, Chemin Saint-Martin; Saguenay QC	48°24′36″N 70°52′48″W	Quebec (8967)		Upload Photo
Site du patrimoine de l'Ancien-Collège-Saint-Édouard-de-Port-Alfred	1320, 1e Avenue; Saguenay QC	48°19′35″N 70°52′48″W	Quebec (9007)		
Site du patrimoine des Maisons-des-Cadres-de-la-Papeterie-de-Port-Alfred	2e Avenue; Saguenay QC	48°19′36″N 70°52′55″W	Quebec (9039)		
Ancienne école du rang Saint-Martin	5122, Chemin Saint-Martin; Saguenay QC	48°24′26″N 70°52′28″W	Quebec (9040)		Upload Photo
Four à pain - 4022, chemin des Chutes	4022, Chemin des Chutes; Saguenay QC	48°19′28″N 70°55′17″W	Quebec (9126)		Upload Photo
Croix de chemin de l'Anse-à-Benjamin	1722, Chemin Saint-Joseph; Saguenay QC	48°21′45″N 70°52′28″W	Quebec (9132)		More images
Site du patrimoine des Maisons-Ouvrières-de-la-Papeterie-de-Port-Alfred	8e Avenue; Saguenay QC	48°19′46″N 70°53′05″W	Quebec (9133)		Upload Photo
Site du patrimoine du Noyau-Institutionnel-de-Saint-Édouard-de-Port-Alfred	491, Boulevard de la Grande-Baie Sud; Saguenay QC	48°19′50″N 70°52′47″W	Quebec (9139)		More images
1562-1566, rue Bagot	1562-1566, Rue Bagot; Saguenay QC	48°20′12″N 70°53′20″W	Quebec (9141)		Upload Photo
3334, chemin des Chutes	3334, Chemin des Chutes; Saguenay QC	48°19′52″N 70°54′30″W	Quebec (9170)		Upload Photo
1983, rue Bagot	1983, Rue Bagot; Saguenay QC	48°20′09″N 70°53′36″W	Quebec (9171)		Upload Photo
Croix du Cap-Saint-Alexis	Rue Saint-Alexis; Saguenay QC	48°19′11″N 70°51′54″W	Quebec (9172)		More images
2183, rue Bagot	2183, Rue Bagot; Saguenay QC	48°20′07″N 70°53′47″W	Quebec (9173)		Upload Photo
Croix de chemin - 1892, chemin Saint-Antoine	1892, Chemin Saint-Antoine; Saguenay QC	48°17′38″N 70°54′28″W	Quebec (9174)		Upload Photo
Croix de chemin	5132 Chemin Saint-Martin; Saguenay QC	48°24′28″N 70°52′34″W	Saguenay municipality (9120)		Upload Photo
1755, boulevard de la Grande-Baie Nord	1755, Boulevard de la Grande-Baie Nord; Saguenay QC	48°21′00″N 70°54′02″W	Quebec (9175)		Upload Photo
Croix de chemin - 8445, chemin de la Batture	8445, Chemin de la Batture; Saguenay QC	48°21′05″N 70°45′00″W	Quebec (9342)		
Site du patrimoine des Écorceurs-de-l'Anse-à-Benjamin	Route de l'Anse-a-Benjamin; Saguenay QC	48°21′09″N 70°51′36″W	Quebec (9526)		More images
Maison Joseph-Cyprien-Bluteau	2205, Boulevard de la Grande-Baie Nord; Saguenay QC	48°21′20″N 70°54′41″W	Quebec (9944)		Upload Photo
Site du patrimoine de l'Église-Notre-Dame-de-La-Baie	2e Rue; Saguenay QC	48°19′30″N 70°52′33″W	Quebec (10293)		
691, 1re Rue	691, 1e Rue; Saguenay QC	48°19′47″N 70°52′38″W	Quebec (10562)		Upload Photo
4202, chemin Saint-Jean	4202, Chemin Saint-Jean; Saguenay QC	48°17′50″N 70°53′48″W	Quebec (10596)		Upload Photo
8782, chemin de la Batture	8782, Chemin de la Batture; Saguenay QC	48°21′08″N 70°44′25″W	Quebec (10597)		Upload Photo
3982, chemin Saint-Joseph	3982, Chemin Saint-Joseph; Saguenay QC	48°22′49″N 70°54′30″W	Quebec (10598)		More images
Calvaire Charles-Perron	2470, Boulevard de la Grande-Baie Nord; Saguenay QC	48°21′35″N 70°55′05″W	Quebec (10599)		Upload Photo
4362, chemin Saint-Jean	4362, Chemin Saint-Jean; Saguenay QC	48°17′45″N 70°53′56″W	Quebec (11235)		Upload Photo
Chapelle Bluteau	Boulevard de la Grande-Baie Nord; Saguenay QC	48°21′23″N 70°54′44″W	Quebec (11455)		Upload Photo
3883, chemin Saint-Joseph	3883, Chemin Saint-Joseph; Saguenay QC	48°22′47″N 70°54′24″W	Quebec (11977)		More images
3783, chemin Saint-Joseph	3783, Chemin Saint-Joseph; Saguenay QC	48°22′40″N 70°54′14″W	Quebec (11978)		More images
Site du patrimoine du Noyau-Institutionnel-de-Saint-Alexis-de-Grande-Baie	Rue Alexis-Simard; Saguenay QC	48°18′59″N 70°51′16″W	Quebec (11979)		
4803-4805, chemin Saint-Martin	4803, Chemin Saint-Martin; Saguenay QC	48°24′26″N 70°51′31″W	Quebec (12007)		Upload Photo
5382, chemin Saint-Martin	5382, Chemin Saint-Martin; Saguenay QC	48°24′39″N 70°53′05″W	Quebec (12453)		Upload Photo
Église de Saint-Marc	1694, Rue Sirois; Saguenay QC	48°20′16″N 70°53′26″W	Quebec (12461)		
Chapelle - 4053, chemin des Chutes	4053, Chemin des Chutes; Saguenay QC	48°19′27″N 70°55′18″W	Quebec (13187)		Upload Photo
Site du patrimoine du Quai-de-Grande-Baie	935, Rue Saint-Pascal; Saguenay QC	48°19′08″N 70°51′04″W	Quebec (13267)		Upload Photo
Site du patrimoine du Vieux-Grande-Baie (secteur Prince-Albert)	3271, Rue du Prince-Albert; Saguenay QC	48°18′52″N 70°51′09″W	Quebec (13474)		
Site du patrimoine du Vieux-Grande-Baie (secteur Saint-Pascal)	3471-3662, Boulevard de la Grande-Baie Sud; Saguenay QC	48°19′02″N 70°51′03″W	Quebec (13475)		Upload Photo
Site du patrimoine du Barachois-de-Grande-Baie	4022, Rue Coulombe; Saguenay QC	48°19′07″N 70°50′47″W	Quebec (13476)		
Site du patrimoine du Quai-Agésilas-Lepage	651, Rue du Cap; Saguenay QC	48°20′40″N 70°52′43″W	Quebec (13477)		
Site du patrimoine de la Maison-John-Kane	1051 a 1113, Rue Bergeron; Saguenay QC	48°18′58″N 70°51′37″W	Quebec (13859)		
Site du patrimoine de la Scierie-Georges-Abel-Tremblay	3200, Avenue du Port; Saguenay QC	48°19′44″N 70°54′23″W	Quebec (13860)		Upload Photo
Maison Petit	1000, boulevard Sainte-Genevieve; Saguenay QC	48°27′04″N 71°05′20″W	Quebec (6211)		
Site du patrimoine de l'Église-de-Saint-Luc	Rue du Regent; Saguenay QC	48°26′31″N 71°03′33″W	Quebec (10988)		
Secteur de l'église Sainte-Anne	Rue Roussel; Saguenay QC	48°26′25″N 71°04′43″W	Quebec (11460)		More images
Site du patrimoine de l'Église-de-Sainte-Claire	Rue Saint-Armand; Saguenay QC	48°26′45″N 71°05′27″W	Quebec (13340)		
École Saint-François-Xavier	272, Rue du Séminaire; Saguenay QC	48°25′38″N 71°03′07″W	Quebec (5551)		
Site du patrimoine de la rue du Séminaire	rue du Séminaire, and parts of rues Bégin, Racine, Jacques-Cartier, and l'Hôtel-Dieu; Saguenay QC	48°25′35″N 71°03′06″W	Quebec (5561)		More images
Ancien couvent des Soeurs-Antoniennes-de-Marie	582, Rue Jacques-Cartier Est; Saguenay QC	48°25′27″N 71°03′08″W	Quebec (8126)		More images
Site du patrimoine du Manoir-Julien-Édouard-Alfred-Dubuc et du Château-John-Murdoch	Saguenay QC	48°25′24″N 71°02′56″W	Quebec (9038)		
Cimetière Saint-François-Xavier	Chemin Saint-Thomas; Saguenay QC	48°25′17″N 71°03′21″W	Quebec (9148)		
Site du patrimoine de l'Église-de-Saint-Isidore	Rue des Ormes; Saguenay QC	48°25′46″N 71°01′25″W	Quebec (12449)		
Site du patrimoine du Monastère-des-Augustines-de-la-Miséricorde-de-Jésus-et-du-Monument-Price	Saguenay QC	48°25′38″N 71°02′49″W	Quebec (13078)		
Site du patrimoine de l'Église-du-Christ-Roi	Rue Sainte-Anne; Saguenay QC	48°25′31″N 71°04′03″W	Quebec (13154)		
Édifice Thomas-Zozyme-Cloutier	184, Rue Jacques-Cartier Est; Saguenay QC	48°25′35″N 71°03′47″W	Quebec (13248)		
Site du patrimoine de l'Église-de-Notre-Dame-de-Grâce	Chemin Sydenham; Saguenay QC	48°25′09″N 71°02′30″W	Quebec (13296)		
Site du patrimoine de l'Église-de-Saint-Nom-de-Jésus	Boulevard du Saguenay Est; Saguenay QC	48°25′47″N 71°02′19″W	Quebec (13339)		
Maison Price	110, rue Price Ouest; Saguenay QC	48°25′30″N 71°04′20″W	Quebec (4315)		More images
Site du patrimoine de la place de l'église Sacré-Coeur	Saguenay QC	48°25′26″N 71°04′33″W	Quebec (8303)		
Site historique du Sacré-Coeur	Rue Bosse; Saguenay QC	48°25′26″N 71°04′33″W	Quebec (10803)		
Église du Sacré-Coeur	Rue Bosse; Saguenay QC	48°25′27″N 71°04′35″W	Quebec (12980)		
Presbytère du Sacré-Coeur	244, Rue Bosse; Saguenay QC	48°25′27″N 71°04′35″W	Quebec (12997)		
Site du patrimoine de l'Église-de-Saint-Antoine	Chemin de la Reserve; Saguenay QC	48°25′27″N 71°05′14″W	Quebec (13295)		
Site historique du Poste-de-Traite-de-Chicoutimi	Boulevard du Saguenay Ouest; Saguenay QC	48°25′44″N 71°04′32″W	Quebec (13806)		
Site du patrimoine de l'Église-de-Saint-Joachim	Rue Jolliet; Saguenay QC	48°25′11″N 71°04′18″W	Quebec (14802)		
Presbytère de Notre-Dame-de-Laterrière	6157, rue Notre-Dame; Saguenay QC	48°18′31″N 71°06′26″W	Quebec (4460)		Upload Photo
Moulin du Père-Honorat	741, rue du Pere-Honorat; Saguenay QC	48°18′14″N 71°06′31″W	Quebec (6921)		
Église de Notre-Dame-de-Laterrière	Rue Notre-Dame; Saguenay QC	48°18′32″N 71°06′28″W	Quebec (12979)		
Maison Jean-Maurice-Coulombe	4860, route Desmeules; Saguenay QC	48°30′36″N 71°16′34″W	Quebec (5588)		More images
Arvida National Historic Site of Canada	Planned community area of Arvida; Arvida QC	48°25′31″N 71°10′57″W	Federal (19569)		
Pont d'aluminium d'Arvida	Route du Pont over the Saguenay River; Saguenay QC	48°26′41″N 71°13′06″W	Quebec (9002)		More images
Noyau institutionnel d'Arvida	Old Arvida High School, Sainte-Thérèse School, Saint-Patrick High School, Saguenay Valley High School, the school of Notre-Dame-du-Sourire, the First United Church, and l'église Saint-George-the-Martyr; Saguenay QC	48°25′59″N 71°11′06″W	Quebec (10280)		Upload Photo
Site du patrimoine de l'Église-de-Saint-Mathias	Rue Levesque; Saguenay QC	48°24′30″N 71°10′17″W	Quebec (11126)		
Site du patrimoine de l'Église-de-Saint-Jacques	Saguenay QC	48°25′13″N 71°10′34″W	Quebec (13334)		
Église de Sainte-Thérèse-de-l'Enfant-Jésus	1802, Ruelle Wohler; Saguenay QC	48°25′57″N 71°10′47″W	Quebec (14381)		
Ancienne résidence des Frères du Sacré-Coeur	2240, Rue Montpetit; Saguenay QC	48°24′45″N 71°15′08″W	Quebec (8299)		
Maison d'animation sociale et culturelle	4014, Rue de la Fabrique (Jonquiere); Saguenay QC	48°24′32″N 71°15′23″W	Quebec (8724)		
Site du patrimoine de la Chapelle-Saint-Cyriac	Rue de la Chapelle; Saguenay QC	48°20′24″N 71°22′15″W	Quebec (10294)		
Site du patrimoine de l'Église-Saint-James-the-Apostle	Saguenay QC	48°25′26″N 71°14′38″W	Quebec (12003)		
Site du patrimoine de l'Église-de-Saint-Dominique	Rue Saint-Dominique; Saguenay QC	48°24′32″N 71°15′24″W	Quebec (13133)		
Site du patrimoine de l'Église-Saint-Andrew-et-Saint-John	Rue du Roi-Georges; Saguenay QC	48°25′30″N 71°14′38″W	Quebec (13301)		
Site du patrimoine de l'Église-de-Notre-Dame-de-Fatima	Rue Notre-Dame; Saguenay QC	48°25′07″N 71°14′11″W	Quebec (13346)		More images
Site du patrimoine de l'Église-de-Saint-Laurent	Saguenay QC	48°25′05″N 71°14′50″W	Quebec (14571)		
Site du patrimoine de l'Église-de-Saint-Matthieu	Saguenay QC	48°25′30″N 71°14′21″W	Quebec (14572)		
Site du patrimoine de l'Église-de-Saint-Georges	Saguenay QC	48°24′57″N 71°15′39″W	Quebec (10295)		More images
Site du patrimoine de l'Église-de-Saint-Raphaël	Rue Saint-Jean-Baptiste; Saguenay QC	48°24′33″N 71°15′52″W	Quebec (13258)		More images
Ancien hôtel de ville d'Isle-Maligne	1671, Avenue du Pont Nord; Alma QC	48°34′54″N 71°37′55″W	Quebec (8830)		More images
Église de Saint-Joseph	1515 Entrée Hôtel De Ville; Alma QC	48°33′03″N 71°39′08″W	Alma municipality (11013)		
Presbytère de Saint-Joseph	70, Rue Saint-Joseph; Alma QC	48°33′03″N 71°39′01″W	Quebec (10986)		
Maison Donaldson	462, boulevard Saint-Joseph; Roberval QC	48°30′33″N 72°13′08″W	Quebec (4250)		More images
Roberval Town Hall National Historic Site of Canada	851 Saint-Joseph Boulevard; Roberval QC	48°31′07″N 72°13′19″W	Federal (14507)		More images
Ancienne fromagerie Perron	148, 15e avenue Saint-Prime QC	48°35′33″N 72°20′16″W	Quebec (4182)		More images
Moulin de La Doré	3951, rue des Peupliers; La Doré QC	48°41′51″N 72°38′42″W	Quebec (6873)		Upload Photo
Maison Rémi-Hudon	612, Rue La Barre; Hébertville QC	48°23′28″N 71°40′40″W	Quebec (13247)		More images
Croix de chemin	24 2e Rang; Saint-Thomas-Didyme QC	48°52′51″N 72°41′28″W	Saint-Thomas-Didyme municipality (10891)		

== See also ==
- List of historic places in Quebec
