= Métabetchouane archaeological site =

- Location within Quebec Location within Canada
- 48°58′19″N 71°58′03″W
- Location: Chambord, Quebec, Canada

Site notes
- Governing body: Parks Canada
- Website: www.patrimoine-culturel.gouv.qc.ca/rpcq/detail.do?methode=consulter&id=93572&type=bien#.XgCtrVVKipp

The Métabetchouane archaeological site is located on the site of a prehistoric Amerindian establishment and a trading post in operation during the French and English regimes. This archaeological site is located in the municipality of Chambord (municipality), in the MRC Le Domaine-du-Roy Regional County Municipality, in Saguenay–Lac-Saint-Jean, in Quebec, in Canada. This archaeological site is located on the west bank of the Métabetchouane River, on a point of land extending into Lac Saint-Jean.

This heritage site has an archaeological value on the Amerindian history and the history of the trading post. This archaeological site, which consists of a large open area and flat relief, covers an area of approximately 2,000 square meters. This site includes the remains of a stone fireplace and the charred traces of a wooden and cob wall. Since June 1, 1988, this site has been classified heritage site by the Ministry of Culture and Communications of Quebec. The residual portion of the site is presumed to still contain archaeological elements favorable to the research and interpretation of the site.

== History of the site ==
This archaeological site of Métabetchouane was an important place of passage, meetings and Amerindian and Euro-Quebec settlements. According to Quebec archaeologists, this site had been occupied for approximately 2000 years before today. This site is presumed to have served mainly as a seasonal camp for the nomadic Amerindian groups of the region.

Many objects and vestiges discovered during archaeological excavations are associated with these domestic occupations. The nature of the objects and their arrangements make it possible to document the native ways of life according to the times. One of the particularly interesting occupations corresponds to some 250 years encompassing the end of indigenous prehistory and the start of the period of contact with individuals of European descent; it is a pivotal time when traditional lifestyles are confronted with French and English culture. While the writings of the first explorers suggest that the site was once the scene of gatherings between indigenous groups engaged in trade, the small proportion of exotic objects accumulated during these two millennia on the site suggests that these interactions were more carried out on a regional scale.

== See also ==
- List of the real estate heritage of Saguenay–Lac-Saint-Jean
