= List of historic places in Capitale-Nationale =

This is a list of historic places in Capitale-Nationale, Quebec, entered on the Canadian Register of Historic Places, whether they are federal, provincial, or municipal. All addresses are the administrative Region 03. For all other listings in the province of Quebec, see List of historic places in Quebec.

Name	Address	Coordinates	Government recognition (CRHP №)	Wikidata ID	Image
Vieux couvent de Saint-Casimir	370, Boulevard de la Montagne; Saint-Casimir QC	46°39′26″N 72°08′30″W	Quebec (15235)		
Beth Israël Cemetery National Historic Site of Canada	René-Lévesque West Boulevard; Sainte-Foy QC	46°47′06″N 71°15′40″W	Federal (16204)		
Valcartier Forestry Research Station Administration Building	41 Murphy Road; Saint-Gabriel-de-Valcartier QC	46°57′07″N 71°29′39″W	Federal (13535)		Upload Photo
La Petite Ferme, House	near Cap Tourmente; QC	47°03′57″N 70°47′37″W	Federal (10233)		More images
Ancien couvent de Saint-Léonard	280, Rue Pettigrew; Saint-Léonard-de-Portneuf QC	46°53′27″N 71°54′24″W	Saint-Léonard-de-Portneuf municipality (14587)		
Forge-menuiserie Cauchon	328, Chemin de la Vallee; La Malbaie QC	47°40′22″N 70°09′48″W	Quebec (1738)		
Grange-étable Bhérer	215, Rue Saint-Raphael; La Malbaie QC	47°39′41″N 70°06′39″W	Quebec (6866)		
Forge Riverin	218, Rue Saint-Etienne; La Malbaie QC	47°39′25″N 70°09′14″W	Quebec (8276)		
Église de Sainte-Agnès	Rue du Patrimoine; La Malbaie QC	47°39′46″N 70°16′09″W	Quebec (12374)		
La Malbaie Historic District National Historic Site of Canada	La Malbaie QC	47°38′44″N 70°09′30″W	Federal (16521)		
Notre-Dame-de-Lorette Church National Historic Site of Canada	73 Maurice-Bastien Boulevard; Wendake QC	46°52′25″N 71°21′36″W	Federal (15153), Quebec (9123)		More images
Old Wendake Historic District National Historic Site of Canada	Wendake QC	46°51′22″N 71°21′12″W	Federal (15907)		
Calvaire de Notre-Dame-des-Sept-Douleurs	rue Notre-Dame; Portneuf QC	46°41′52″N 71°53′14″W	Quebec (1648)		More images
Chalouperie Godbout	120, Rue de la Chalouperie; Saint-Laurent-de-l'Île-d'Orléans QC	46°51′33″N 71°00′51″W	Quebec (1690)		More images
La Grande-Ferme	800, Chemin du Cap-Tourmente; Saint-Joachim QC	47°03′06″N 70°49′07″W	Quebec (1718)		More images
Maison Pierre-Thibault	8124, Avenue Royale; Chateau-Richer QC	46°58′22″N 71°00′57″W	Quebec (1721)		More images
Maison Delisle	172, Chemin du Roy; Deschambault-Grondines QC	46°39′28″N 71°55′31″W	Quebec (1722)		More images
Maison Sewell	106, Chemin du Roy; Deschambault-Grondines QC	46°40′43″N 71°54′38″W	Quebec (1723)		More images
Moulin de La Chevrotière	109, Rue Chavigny; Deschambault-Grondines QC	46°37′40″N 71°59′18″W	Quebec (1724)		More images
Vieux presbytère de Deschambault	106, Rue Saint-Joseph; Deschambault-Grondines QC	46°38′54″N 71°55′39″W	Quebec (1726)		More images
Moulin à vent de Grondines	Route des Ancetres Ouest; Deschambault-Grondines QC	46°35′17″N 72°02′16″W	Quebec (1728)		More images
Maison Denis	1208, Route 138; Neuville QC	46°41′59″N 71°37′33″W	Quebec (1731)		More images
Maison Larue	306, Rue des Erables; Neuville QC	46°41′42″N 71°34′33″W	Quebec (1733)		More images
Maison Racine	9050, Avenue Royale; Sainte-Anne-de-Beaupré QC	47°00′44″N 70°57′45″W	Quebec (1739)		More images
Maison Gagnon	4403, Chemin Royal; Sainte-Famille QC	46°59′38″N 70°55′33″W	Quebec (1741)		More images
Relais de poste de Deschambault	258, Chemin du Roy (Deschambault); Deschambault-Grondines QC	46°38′54″N 71°55′54″W	Quebec (1745)		More images
Arrondissement historique de l'Île-d'Orléans	Île d'Orléans QC	46°51′54″N 71°06′14″W	Quebec (4205)		More images
Maison Bouchard	260, Chemin du Ruisseau-Rouge; L'Isle-aux-Coudres QC	47°22′20″N 70°23′50″W	Quebec (4247)		More images
Maison Lefebvre	747, Rue des Erables; Neuville QC	46°41′51″N 71°35′10″W	Quebec (4314)		More images
Manoir de Charleville	5580, Avenue Royale; Boischatel QC	46°54′13″N 71°07′16″W	Quebec (4475)		
Moulin à vent de L'Isle-aux-Coudres	247, Chemin du Moulin; L'Isle-aux-Coudres QC	47°22′21″N 70°23′58″W	Quebec (4859)		More images
Maison Pageau	258, Rue du Bataillon; Boischatel QC	46°53′40″N 71°08′23″W	Quebec (4860)		More images
Bateau Le Saint-André	Les Éboulements QC	47°27′19″N 70°21′45″W	Quebec (4861)		More images
Maison Vézina	171, Rue des Grenadiers; Boischatel QC	46°53′31″N 71°08′33″W	Boischatel municipality (4862)		More images
Maison de Claude-Gilbert-et-Claire-Gagnon	5056, Avenue Royale; Boischatel QC	46°53′31″N 71°08′34″W	Boischatel municipality (4864)		More images
Maison de la Veuve-Groleau	200, Chemin du Roy; Deschambault-Grondines QC	46°39′02″N 71°55′41″W	Quebec (4928)		More images
Chapelle de procession de Saint-Nicolas	Rang Saint-Joseph; Les Éboulements QC	47°28′48″N 70°20′07″W	Quebec (4931)		More images
Chapelle de procession Notre-Dame-de-Grâce	6357, Avenue Royale; L'Ange-Gardien QC	46°55′03″N 71°05′22″W	Quebec (4933)		More images
Moulin à eau de L'Isle-aux-Coudres	36, Chemin du Moulin; L'Isle-aux-Coudres QC	47°22′22″N 70°23′57″W	Quebec (4939)		More images
Maison Loriot	96, Route 138; Neuville QC	46°43′14″N 71°32′39″W	Quebec (5025)		More images
Maison Laberge	24, Rue de la Mairie; L'Ange-Gardien QC	46°55′06″N 71°05′30″W	Quebec (5026)		More images
Maison Darveau	210, Route 138; Neuville QC	46°42′58″N 71°33′16″W	Quebec (5035)		More images
Maison Louis-Bernard	713, Rue des Erables; Neuville QC	46°41′52″N 71°35′03″W	Quebec (5036)		More images
Presbytère de Saint-Charles-des-Grondines	490, Route 138; Deschambault-Grondines QC	46°35′31″N 72°02′28″W	Quebec (5154)		More images
Maison Gendreau	2387, Chemin Royal; Saint-Laurent-de-l'Île-d'Orléans QC	46°51′37″N 71°02′49″W	Quebec (5634)		More images
Chapelle de procession Saint-Isidore	237, Chemin des Coudriers; L'Isle-aux-Coudres QC	47°22′19″N 70°24′19″W	Quebec (5637)		More images
Chapelle de procession Saint-Pierre	237, Chemin des Coudriers; L'Isle-aux-Coudres QC	47°22′13″N 70°24′36″W	Quebec (5638)		More images
Maison Jacob	5361, avenue Royale; Boischatel QC	46°53′49″N 71°08′10″W	Quebec (5645)		More images
Maison Leclerc	114, rue Principale; L'Isle-aux-Coudres QC	47°23′51″N 70°21′19″W	Quebec (5646)		More images
Manoir Édouard-Larue	624, Rue des Erables; Neuville QC	46°41′57″N 71°34′47″W	Quebec (6894)		More images
Ancienne église de Saint-Pierre	1249, Chemin Royal; Saint-Pierre-de-l'Île-d'Orléans QC	46°53′19″N 71°04′26″W	Quebec (7039)		More images
Couvent de la Congrégation-de-Notre-Dame	652, Rue des Erables; Neuville QC	46°41′55″N 71°34′56″W	Neuville municipality (7970)		More images
Église Saint-John-the-Evangelist	95, 1e Avenue; Portneuf QC	46°41′39″N 71°52′38″W	Portneuf municipality (7972)		More images
Chapelle Saint-Joseph-du-Lac	Route de Fossambault; Fossambault-sur-le-Lac QC	46°53′26″N 71°36′44″W	Fossambault-sur-le-Lac municipality (8337)		More images
Croix lumineuse de Sainte-Brigitte-de-Laval	Sainte-Brigitte-de-Laval QC	47°00′36″N 71°11′27″W	Sainte-Brigitte-de-Laval municipality (8413)		More images
Chapelle Notre-Dame-du-Lac-Sergent	Chemin de la Chapelle; Lac-Sergent QC	46°51′51″N 71°43′35″W	Lac-Sergent municipality (8417)		More images
Manoir de la Baronnie-de-Portneuf	100, 1e Avenue; Portneuf QC	46°41′39″N 71°52′41″W	Quebec (8601), Portneuf municipality (12002)		
École Saint-Charles-de-Grondines	525, Rue Principale; Deschambault-Grondines QC	46°35′34″N 72°02′36″W	Deschambault-Grondines municipality (8612)		More images
Couvent des Rédemptoristines	10079, Avenue Royale; Sainte-Anne-de-Beaupré QC	47°01′31″N 70°55′44″W	Sainte-Anne-de-Beaupré municipality (8687)		More images
Église de Sainte-Famille	Cote du Quai; Cap-Santé QC	46°40′14″N 71°47′15″W	Quebec (8859)		More images
Maison Chrétien	137, Chemin Royal; Saint-François-de-l'Île-d'Orléans QC	47°00′27″N 70°53′08″W	Quebec (9334)		More images
Maison Morisset	4417, Chemin Royal; Sainte-Famille QC	46°59′41″N 70°55′31″W	Quebec (9336)		More images
Maison Hébert-Dit-Lecompte	3404, Chemin Royal; Saint-Jean-de-l'Île-d'Orléans QC	46°57′12″N 70°51′40″W	Quebec (9343)		More images
Calvaire du cimetière de Sainte-Brigitte-de-Laval	Sainte-Brigitte-de-Laval QC	47°00′05″N 71°11′36″W	Sainte-Brigitte-de-Laval municipality (9646)		More images
Calvaire Jean-Gagnon	Avenue Sainte-Brigitte; Sainte-Brigitte-de-Laval QC	47°02′07″N 71°10′40″W	Sainte-Brigitte-de-Laval municipality (9652)		More images
Calvaire Léonidas-Lachance	Avenue Sainte-Brigitte; Sainte-Brigitte-de-Laval QC	46°58′02″N 71°12′27″W	Sainte-Brigitte-de-Laval municipality (9653)		More images
Séminaire Saint-Alphonse	10026, Avenue Royale; Sainte-Anne-de-Beaupré QC	47°01′31″N 70°55′38″W	Sainte-Anne-de-Beaupré municipality (10180)		
Ancienne centrale hydroélectrique Saint-Alban 2	Saint-Alban QC	46°42′24″N 72°04′57″W	Saint-Alban municipality (10181)		More images
Site du patrimoine de Petite-Rivière-Saint-François	Rue Principale; Petite-Rivière-Saint-François QC	47°17′12″N 70°34′18″W	Petite-Rivière-Saint-François municipality (10185)		
Site historique de Sainte-Famille	Cote du Quai; Cap-Santé QC	46°40′14″N 71°47′15″W	Quebec (10226)		More images
Goélette Marie-Clarisse II	Rue de l'Eglise; Les Éboulements QC	47°27′21″N 70°21′40″W	Quebec (10258)		More images
Couvent de Deschambault	115, Rue de l'Eglise; Deschambault-Grondines QC	46°38′51″N 71°55′39″W	Deschambault-Grondines municipality (10335)		More images
Maison Simard	2078, Avenue Royale; Saint-Ferréol-les-Neiges QC	47°05′10″N 70°53′04″W	Quebec (10588)		
Maison Imbeau	237, Chemin Royal; Saint-François-de-l'Île-d'Orléans QC	47°01′10″N 70°50′58″W	Quebec (10642)		More images
Maison Léonidas-Vézina	5490, Avenue Royale; Boischatel QC	46°54′01″N 71°07′40″W	Boischatel municipality (10714)		
French People's House	Cap-Tourmente QC	47°04′34″N 70°46′52″W	Federal (10852)		
Église de Saint-Jean	Chemin Royal; Saint-Jean-de-l'Île-d'Orléans QC	46°55′13″N 70°53′24″W	Quebec (10951)		More images
Place de l'Église-Saint-Edmond-de-Stoneham	1e Avenue; Stoneham-et-Tewkesbury QC	46°59′57″N 71°21′48″W	Stoneham-et-Tewkesbury municipality (11066)		
Noyau religieux de Saint-Léonard-de-Portneuf	Rue Principale; Saint-Léonard-de-Portneuf QC	46°53′24″N 71°54′29″W	Saint-Léonard-de-Portneuf municipality (11139)		
Caveau à légumes	11486, Avenue Royale; Beaupré QC	47°02′45″N 70°52′54″W	Beaupré municipality (11205)		
Maison Louis-Asselin	135, Chemin Royal; Saint-François-de-l'Île-d'Orléans QC	47°00′20″N 70°53′03″W	Quebec (11330)		
Presbytère de Saint-Joachim	165, Rue de l'Eglise; Saint-Joachim QC	47°03′15″N 70°50′39″W	Quebec (11424)		
Petite école du 4e rang	90, Rue Saint-Patrick; Shannon QC	46°53′24″N 71°31′21″W	Shannon municipality (11980)		
Choeur de l'Église-Saint-François-de-Sales	Rue des Erables; Neuville QC	46°41′52″N 71°35′01″W	Quebec (11990)		
Chapelle de procession de Sainte-Famille	Chemin Royal; Sainte-Famille QC	46°58′17″N 70°57′52″W	Quebec (11997)		
Mauvide-Genest Manor National Historic Site of Canada	1451 Chemin Royale; Saint-Jean-de-l'Île-d'Orléans QC	46°55′00″N 70°54′00″W	Federal (12024), Quebec (13121)		More images
Église de Saint-Charles-des-Grondines	Rue Principale; Deschambault-Grondines QC	46°35′33″N 72°02′30″W	Quebec (12373)		More images
Salle des Habitants	109, Rue de l'Eglise; Deschambault-Grondines QC	46°38′54″N 71°55′42″W	Deschambault-Grondines municipality (12379)		
Église de Saint-Joachim	Rue de l'Eglise; Saint-Joachim QC	47°03′17″N 70°50′39″W	Quebec (12381)		
Maison Roberge	152, Chemin Royal; Saint-François-de-l'Île-d'Orléans QC	47°00′19″N 70°52′40″W	Quebec (12384)		
Maison Jean-Boudreau	128, Chemin du Roy (Deschambault); Deschambault-Grondines QC	46°40′15″N 71°55′18″W	Deschambault-Grondines municipality (12385)		
Calvaire Alexandre-Naud	Chemin du Roy (Deschambault); Deschambault-Grondines QC	46°38′03″N 71°58′03″W	Deschambault-Grondines municipality (12393)		
Pagé - Rinfret House / Beaudry House National Historic Site of Canada	66 Rue du Roy; Cap-Santé QC	46°40′18″N 71°47′00″W	Federal (12893)		
École de fabrique de Saint-François	339, Chemin Royal; Saint-François-de-l'Île-d'Orléans QC	47°00′09″N 70°48′45″W	Quebec (13045)		More images
Maison Guyon-Lessard	7753, Avenue Royale; Chateau-Richer QC	46°57′51″N 71°01′46″W	Chateau-Richer municipality (13188)		
Vieux couvent de Château-Richer	7976, Avenue Royale; Château-Richer QC	46°58′08″N 71°01′07″W	Château-Richer municipality (13234)		More images
Édifice des Chevaliers de Colomb	405, Rue Tessier Est; Saint-Casimir QC	46°39′22″N 72°08′22″W	Saint-Casimir municipality (13300)		
Site du patrimoine de la Place-de-l'Église	Rue de l'Eglise; Château-Richer QC	46°58′12″N 71°01′06″W	Château-Richer municipality (13302)		
Île d'Orléans Seigneury National Historic Site of Canada	Saint-Jean-de-l'Île-d'Orléans QC	46°55′00″N 70°54′00″W	Federal (13574)		
Site historique du Fort-Jacques-Cartier-et-du-Manoir-Allsopp	15, Rue Notre-Dame; Cap-Santé QC	46°40′24″N 71°45′05″W	Quebec (13634)		
Grange Lajoie	Rang Saint-Jean-Baptiste; Saint-Urbain QC	47°36′50″N 70°29′12″W	Quebec (13861)		
Basilique de Sainte-Anne-de-Beaupré	Avenue Royale; Sainte-Anne-de-Beaupré QC	47°01′26″N 70°55′43″W	Sainte-Anne-de-Beaupré municipality (13929)		More images
Saint-Joseph-de-la-Rive Shipyard National Historic Site of Canada	305 rue de l’Eglise; Saint-Joseph-de-la-Rive QC	47°27′00″N 70°22′00″W	Federal (13961)		More images
Presbytère de L'Ange-Gardien	6357, Avenue Royale; L'Ange-Gardien QC	46°54′58″N 71°05′39″W	L'Ange-Gardien municipality (14241)		
57-63 St. Louis Street National Historic Site of Canada	57-63 Saint-Louis Street; QC	46°48′39″N 71°12′30″W	Federal (1151)		More images
240, Rue de l'Église	240, Rue de l'Eglise; Quebec City QC	46°54′36″N 71°20′54″W	Quebec City municipality (5246)		Upload Photo
648, Boulevard Louis-XIV	648, Boulevard Louis-XIV; QC	46°51′31″N 71°16′26″W	municipality (5249)		More images
696, Boulevard Louis-XIV	696, Boulevard Louis-XIV; QC	46°51′33″N 71°16′22″W	municipality (5242)		More images
962, Carré de Tracy Est	962, Carre de Tracy Est; Quebec City QC	46°53′04″N 71°14′54″W	Quebec City municipality (5247)		More images
1761, Avenue de la Rivière-Jaune	1761, Avenue de la Riviere-Jaune; Quebec City QC	46°55′15″N 71°20′55″W	Quebec City municipality (5245)		
7570, 1ière Avenue	7570, 1e Avenue; QC	46°51′31″N 71°16′03″W	municipality (5244)		More images
9191, Place Hector-Laferté	9191, Place Hector-Laferte; QC	46°53′39″N 71°17′56″W	municipality (5243)		More images
20350, Boulevard Henri-Bourassa	20350, Boulevard Henri-Bourassa; QC	46°53′59″N 71°18′17″W	municipality (5248)		More images
Administration Building	390 avenue de Bernières; QC	46°48′12″N 71°13′07″W	Federal (10229)		More images
Aile du jardin du Monastère-des-Augustines-de-l'Hôtel-Dieu-de-Québec	75, Rue des Remparts; QC	46°48′55″N 71°12′36″W	Quebec (8614)		More images
Aile du noviciat du Monastère-des-Augustines-de-l'Hôtel-Dieu-de-Québec	75, Rue des Remparts; QC	46°48′55″N 71°12′36″W	Quebec (8615)		More images
Ancien hôpital Jeffery-Hale	250, Boulevard Rene-Levesque Est; QC	46°48′24″N 71°13′22″W	Quebec (11998)		More images
Ancien palais de justice de Québec	39, Rue des Jardins; QC	46°48′43″N 71°12′23″W	Quebec (9636)		
Armoury and HMCS Montcalm Training Centre	835 Laurier Avenue East; QC	46°48′14″N 71°13′04″W	Federal (4349)		
Armoury	Beauport QC	46°51′34″N 71°11′07″W	Federal (10450)		More images
Arrondissement historique de Beauport		46°51′32″N 71°11′25″W	Quebec (14201)		
Arrondissement historique de Charlesbourg		46°51′40″N 71°16′12″W	Quebec (10936)		
Arrondissement historique de Québec		46°48′46″N 71°12′37″W	Quebec (3134)		More images
Arrondissement historique de Sillery		46°46′39″N 71°14′46″W	Quebec (5572)		More images
Assemblée nationale du Québec		46°48′33″N 71°12′48″W	Quebec (9381)		More images
Auberge Hugh-Glover	2095, Chemin Sainte-Foy; QC	46°47′22″N 71°16′07″W	Quebec (12034)		More images
Bon-Pasteur Chapel National Historic Site of Canada	1080 Lachevrotiere Street; QC	46°48′27″N 71°13′04″W	Federal (7558), Quebec (7328)		
Staff Headquarters of the Royal 22 Regiment, former Hospital, Building 1	Québec Citadel, Mann's Bastion; QC	46°48′25″N 71°12′25″W	Federal (3346)		More images
Building 2	Québec Citadel; QC	46°48′24″N 71°12′26″W	Federal (10445)		More images
Building 3	Québec Citadel, Dalhousie and Richmond Bastions; QC	46°48′25″N 71°12′25″W	Federal (3650)		
Building 4 / Messenger's House	97 St. Louis Street; QC	46°48′33″N 71°12′39″W	Federal (11209)		Upload Photo
Regimental Chapel / Former Powder Magazine, Building 5	Québec Citadel; QC	46°48′25″N 71°12′25″W	Federal (3648)		More images
Building 6	Québec Citadel; QC	46°48′29″N 71°12′22″W	Federal (10513)		
Building 7	Québec Citadel; QC	46°48′25″N 71°12′25″W	Federal (3647)		More images
Building 8	Québec Citadel, Mann's and Prince of Wales Bastions; QC	46°48′22″N 71°12′25″W	Federal (3645)		
Building No. 10	Québec Citadel, King's Bastion; QC	46°48′30″N 71°12′20″W	Federal (10169)		More images
Sargeants Mess / Jebbs Redoubt, Building 13	Québec Citadel; QC	46°48′25″N 71°12′25″W	Federal (3646)		
Building 14	Québec Citadel; QC	46°48′24″N 71°12′27″W	Federal (10516)		More images
Building 15	Québec Citadel, Prince of Wales Bastion; QC	46°48′23″N 71°12′26″W	Federal (3641)		More images
Building 16	Québec Citadel; QC	46°48′23″N 71°12′26″W	Federal (10707)		Upload Photo
Building 17	Québec Citadel; QC	46°48′26″N 71°12′29″W	Federal (11657)		More images
Building 18	Québec Citadel; QC	46°48′25″N 71°12′25″W	Federal (3344)		
Building 20	Québec Citadel, Mann's Bastion; QC	46°48′23″N 71°12′22″W	Federal (3343)		More images
Building 21	Québec Citadel; QC	46°48′N 71°12′W	Federal (10872)		Upload Photo
Building 22	Québec Citadel, Richmond Bastion; QC	46°48′25″N 71°12′25″W	Federal (3649)		Upload Photo
Building 24	St. Louis Bastion; QC	46°48′25″N 71°12′25″W	Federal (3640)		Upload Photo
Building 25	Québec Citadel, Dalhousie Bastion; QC	46°48′25″N 71°12′25″W	Federal (3635)		Upload Photo
Building 26	Québec Citadel, Richmond Bastion; QC	46°48′25″N 71°12′25″W	Federal (3636)		Upload Photo
Building 28	Québec Citadel; QC	46°48′28″N 71°12′20″W	Federal (11429)		More images
Building 29	Québec Citadel, King's Bastion; QC	46°48′26″N 71°12′48″W	Federal (10911)		Upload Photo
Building 30	Québec Citadel, King's Bastion; QC	46°48′30″N 71°12′19″W	Federal (10895)		Upload Photo
Building 32	Québec Citadel; QC	46°48′32″N 71°12′16″W	Federal (10649)		More images
Building 41	Québec Citadel, Dalhousie Bastion; QC	46°48′25″N 71°12′32″W	Federal (11147)		Upload Photo
Building 42	Québec Citadel, Dalhousie Bastion; QC	46°48′31″N 71°12′28″W	Federal (11148)		Upload Photo
Building 44	Québec Citadel, Prince of Wales Bastion; QC	46°48′25″N 71°12′25″W	Federal (3651)		Upload Photo
Building 45	Québec Citadel; QC	46°48′25″N 71°12′25″W	Federal (3638)		
Building 46	Québec Citadel; QC	46°48′25″N 71°12′25″W	Federal (3639)		More images
Bélanger-Girardin House National Historic Site of Canada	603 Royale Avenue; Beauport QC	46°51′34″N 71°11′33″W	Federal (7383)		
Cap Redoubt	Québec Citadel; QC	46°48′25″N 71°12′25″W	Federal (3674)		
Capitol Theatre / Québec Auditorium National Historic Site of Canada	972 Saint-Jean Street; Quebec City QC	46°48′46″N 71°12′48″W	Federal (7405)		
Cartier-Brébeuf National Historic Site of Canada	175 Espinay Street; Quebec City QC	46°49′29″N 71°14′20″W	Federal (14131)		
Cathédrale Holy Trinity	Rue des Jardins; Quebec City QC	46°48′45″N 71°12′26″W	Quebec (13336)		More images
Champlain Maritime Station	901, Rue du Cap-Diamant; Quebec City QC	46°47′46″N 71°13′16″W	Federal (10393)		Upload Photo
Château Frontenac National Historic Site of Canada	1, Des Carrieres Street; Quebec City QC	46°48′42″N 71°12′20″W	Federal (1320)		More images
Choeur des religieuses du Monastère-des-Augustines-de-l'Hôtel-Dieu-de-Québec	32, Rue Charlevoix; QC	46°48′55″N 71°12′36″W	Quebec (8987)		
Connaught Barracks, Building 1	St. Louis Bastion; QC	46°48′31″N 71°12′41″W	Federal (10394)		More images
Connaught Barracks, Building 2	Cote de la Citadelle; QC	46°48′31″N 71°12′41″W	Federal (11107)		More images
Dauphine Redoubt	22 'A' McMahon Street; QC	46°48′48″N 71°12′48″W	Federal (11238)		More images
Domaine Cataraqui	2141, Chemin Saint-Louis; QC	46°46′23″N 71°15′12″W	Quebec (4841)		More images
École du Cap-Diamant	477, Rue Champlain; QC	46°48′07″N 71°12′35″W	Quebec (9333)		More images
École Saint-Charles-de-Hedleyville	699-701, 3e Rue; QC	46°49′25″N 71°13′19″W	Quebec (8315)		More images
Église de Notre-Dame-des-Victoires	Place Royale; Quebec City QC	46°48′47″N 71°12′10″W	Quebec (15066)		
Église de Saint-Charles-Borromée	1e Avenue; QC	46°51′40″N 71°16′12″W	Quebec (10525)		More images
Église de Saint-Jean-Baptiste	Rue Saint-Jean; QC	46°48′33″N 71°13′22″W	Quebec (14343)		More images
Église des Augustines-de-l'Hôtel-Dieu-de-Québec	Rue Charlevoix; QC	46°48′54″N 71°12′37″W	Quebec (9004)		More images
Enclos paroissial Saint-Matthew	755, Rue Saint-Jean; QC	46°48′39″N 71°13′06″W	Quebec (8861)		More images
Esplanade Powder Magazine	100 Saint-Louis Street; QC	46°48′36″N 71°12′41″W	Federal (10985)		More images
Façades de la Terrasse-Clapham	690, Grande Allee Est; QC	46°48′25″N 71°12′57″W	Quebec (8325)		More images
Federal Building	130, Dalhousie Street; QC	46°49′02″N 71°12′04″W	Federal (10854)		
Former Mess Hall No. 1	63-63A Saint-Louis Street; Quebec City QC	46°48′40″N 71°12′31″W	Federal (4796)		More images
Fort Charlesbourg Royal National Historic Site of Canada	Cap-Rouge QC	46°44′51″N 71°20′32″W	Federal (16661)		
Fortifications of Québec National Historic Site of Canada	100 Saint-Louis Street; Quebec City QC	46°48′36″N 71°12′39″W	Federal (13037)		
Garrison Club	97 St. Louis Street; Quebec City QC	46°48′33″N 71°12′38″W	Federal (9707)		
Grande Allée Drill Hall	805 Laurier Avenue East; Quebec City QC	46°48′23″N 71°12′51″W	Federal (3461)		
Grande Allée Drill Hall National Historic Site of Canada	805 Laurier Avenue East; Quebec City QC	46°48′23″N 71°12′51″W	Federal (4214)		More images
Gun Carriage Store	Quebec City QC	46°48′25″N 71°12′25″W	Federal (10735)		More images
Health and Welfare Building	330, Rue de la Gare du Palais; Quebec City QC	46°49′05″N 71°12′47″W	Federal (10862)		More images
Henry-Stuart House National Historic Site of Canada	82 Grande-Allee West (corner of Cartier Avenue); Quebec City QC	46°48′09″N 71°13′25″W	Federal (7871)		
Holy Trinity Anglican Cathedral National Historic Site of Canada	31 des Jardins Street; Quebec City QC	46°48′46″N 71°12′27″W	Federal (7323)		
Hôpital-Général de Québec Cemetery National Historic Site of Canada	Saint Anselme Street; Quebec City QC	46°48′46″N 71°13′48″W	Federal (7873)		More images
Hôtel-Dieu de Québec National Historic Site of Canada	11 Cote du Palais; QC	46°48′54″N 71°12′39″W	Federal (10384)		More images
Jebb's Redoubt	Québec Citadel; Quebec City QC	46°48′25″N 71°12′25″W	Federal (3643)		Upload Photo
Louis S. St-Laurent Building, Old Post Office	3 Buade Street; Quebec City QC	46°48′48″N 71°12′48″W	Federal (14966)		More images
Louis S. St-Laurent House	201-03, Rue Grande-Allee Est; QC	46°48′12″N 71°13′17″W	Federal (10245)		More images
Loyola House / National School Building National Historic Site of Canada	29-35 d'Auteuil Street; QC	46°48′44″N 71°12′45″W	Federal (14223), Quebec (5502)		More images
Maillou House	17 Saint-Louis Street; QC	46°48′43″N 71°12′23″W	Federal (3765, (7638)		More images
Maison André-Bouchard	17, Rue Couillard; QC	46°48′55″N 71°12′27″W	Quebec (12450)		More images
Maison Anne-Hamilton	129, Rue Saint-Paul; QC	46°48′59″N 71°12′19″W	Quebec (9061)		More images
Maison Antoine-Vanfelson	11, Rue des Jardins; QC	46°48′48″N 71°12′26″W	Quebec (1415)		More images
Maison Arthur-Carmichael	6985, 1re Avenue; QC	46°51′21″N 71°15′52″W	municipality (5253)		More images
Maison Beaumont-Lefebvre	7865, Rue Leo-Lessard; QC	46°51′02″N 71°17′12″W	Quebec (13479)		
Maison Benjamin-Tremain	137, Rue Saint-Paul; QC	46°48′59″N 71°12′19″W	Quebec (6914)		More images
Maison Chalifour	415, Avenue Sainte-Therese; QC	46°53′43″N 71°13′08″W	Quebec (10871)		More images
Maison Charles-Marié	38, Rue Sainte-Angele; QC	46°48′46″N 71°12′42″W	Quebec (6924)		More images
Maison Cornelius-Krieghoff	115, Grande Allee Ouest; QC	46°48′07″N 71°13′26″W	Quebec (6981)		More images
Maison Crémazie	60, Rue Saint-Louis; QC	46°48′41″N 71°12′29″W	Quebec (9335)		More images
Maison des Bédard	6541, Avenue Monette; QC	46°51′11″N 71°15′36″W	Quebec (10661)		
Maison des Jésuites-de-Sillery	2320, Chemin du Foulon; QC	46°46′07″N 71°15′28″W	Quebec (6877)		More images
Maison du Fort	10, Rue Sainte-Anne; QC	46°48′47″N 71°12′18″W	Quebec (6874)		More images
Maison Étienne-Marchand	1, Rue Sainte-Famille; QC	46°48′57″N 71°12′24″W	Quebec (5284)		More images
Maison François-Durette	18, Rue Ferland; QC	46°48′54″N 71°12′25″W	Quebec (13352)		
Maison François-Jacquet-Dit-Langevin	34, Rue Saint-Louis; QC	46°48′42″N 71°12′26″W	Quebec (7175)		More images
Maison François-Xavier-Garneau	14, Rue Saint-Flavien; QC	46°48′55″N 71°12′27″W	Quebec (8080)		More images
Maison George-Larouche	52, Rue Saint-Nicolas; QC	46°48′58″N 71°12′47″W	Quebec (12390)		
Maison George-William-Usborne	2316, Chemin du Foulon; QC	46°46′07″N 71°15′27″W	Quebec (12930)		Upload Photo
Maison Gervais-Beaudoin	54, Cote de la Montagne; QC	46°48′47″N 71°12′14″W	Quebec (9023)		
Maison Girardin	Avenue Royale; QC	46°51′34″N 71°11′31″W	Quebec (9076)		More images
Maison Goldsworthy	37, Rue Sainte-Ursule; QC	46°48′41″N 71°12′38″W	Quebec (6863)		More images
Maison Gomin	2026, Boulevard Rene-Levesque Ouest; QC	46°47′14″N 71°15′36″W	municipality (5048)		More images
Maison Gore	8, Avenue des Cascades; QC	46°51′50″N 71°12′16″W	Quebec (12448)		Upload Photo
Maison Guillaume-Estèbe	92, Rue Saint-Pierre; QC	46°48′54″N 71°12′11″W	Quebec (6925)		More images
Maison Hamel-Bruneau	2608, Chemin Saint-Louis; QC	46°46′02″N 71°16′23″W	Quebec (8346)		More images
Maison Henry-Stuart	1195, Avenue Cartier; QC	46°48′09″N 71°13′25″W	Quebec (9063)		More images
Maison Houde	684, Grande Allee Est; QC	46°48′24″N 71°12′57″W	Quebec (8324)		More images
Maison James-Black	15, Rue du Fort; QC	46°48′48″N 71°12′19″W	Quebec (9077)		More images
Maison James-Murray	1080, Rue Saint-Jean; QC	46°48′49″N 71°12′41″W	Quebec (8103)		More images
Maison James-Thompson	4, Ruelle des Ursulines; QC	46°48′40″N 71°12′35″W	Quebec (9021)		More images
Maison Jean-Baptiste-Chevalier	5, Rue du Cul-de-Sac; QC	46°48′44″N 71°12′11″W	Quebec (8588)		More images
Maison Jean-Demers	30, Boulevard Champlain; QC	46°48′41″N 71°12′12″W	Quebec (7204)		More images
Maison Jean-Étienne-Jayac	133, Rue Saint-Paul; QC	46°48′59″N 71°12′19″W	Quebec (7176)		More images
Maison Jean-Langevin	42, Avenue Sainte-Geneviève; QC	46°48′35″N 71°12′19″W	Quebec (12952)		More images
Maison Jean-Renaud	18, Rue Saint-Pierre; QC	46°48′48″N 71°12′09″W	Quebec (6695)		Upload Photo
Maison Joseph-Canac-Dit-Marquis	64, Cote de la Montagne; QC	46°48′46″N 71°12′12″W	Quebec (13135)		
Maison Joseph-Morrin	14, Rue Hebert; QC	46°48′55″N 71°12′20″W	Quebec (4929)		More images
Maison Joseph-Petitclerc	22, Rue Garneau; QC	46°48′53″N 71°12′28″W	Quebec (11996)		
Maison Larchevêque-Lelièvre	50, Cote de la Fabrique; QC	46°48′52″N 71°12′30″W	Quebec (7316)		More images
Maison Laurent-Dit-Lortie	3200, Chemin Royal; QC	46°51′04″N 71°12′36″W	Quebec (9337)		More images
Maison Letellier	41, Rue des Remparts; QC	46°48′58″N 71°12′26″W	Quebec (11995)		More images
Maison Lévesque	1300, Rue Levesque; QC	46°52′52″N 71°15′18″W	municipality (5252)		Upload Photo
Maison Louis-Fornel	9-11 1/2, Place Royale; QC	46°48′47″N 71°12′09″W	Quebec (7203)		More images
Maison Louis-Joseph-De-Montcalm	45 - 51, Rue des Remparts; QC	46°48′59″N 71°12′27″W	Quebec (8108)		More images
Maison Madame-De La Peltrie	12, Rue Donnacona; QC	46°48′44″N 71°12′28″W	Quebec (12397)		
Maison Maizerets	2000, Boulevard Montmorency; QC	46°50′09″N 71°12′50″W	Quebec (14763)		More images
Maison Mercier	113, Rue Saint-Paul; QC	46°48′59″N 71°12′18″W	Quebec (9078)		More images
Maison Michel-Cureux	86, Rue Saint-Louis; QC	46°48′37″N 71°12′35″W	Quebec (10727)		More images
Maison Pageau	10, Rue Saint-Stanislas; QC	46°48′50″N 71°12′43″W	Quebec (13046)		More images
Maison Parent	2240, Avenue de Lisieux; QC	46°51′18″N 71°12′15″W	Quebec (8308)		
Maison Pierre-Bidégaré	20, Rue Saint-Flavien; QC	46°48′55″N 71°12′28″W	Quebec (4312)		More images
Maison Pierre-Stanislas-et-Elzéar-Bédard	18, Rue Mont-Carmel; QC	46°48′40″N 71°12′23″W	Quebec (12372)		More images
Maison Rémi-Rinfret-Dit-Malouin	1044, Rue Saint-Jean; QC	46°48′44″N 71°12′45″W	Quebec (9022)		More images
Maison Robert-Jellard	24, Rue Sainte-Ursule; QC	46°48′42″N 71°12′39″W	Quebec (9098)		More images
Maison Routhier	3325, Rue Rochambeau; QC	46°46′07″N 71°19′11″W	Quebec (8587)		More images
Maison Savard	170, Rue Giroux; QC	46°50′51″N 71°21′12″W	Quebec (8175)		
Maison Simon-Bédard	38, Rue Saint-Nicolas; QC	46°48′58″N 71°12′48″W	Quebec (6913)		More images
Maison Tessier-Dit-Laplante	2328, Avenue Royale; QC	46°53′06″N 71°09′27″W	Quebec (6926)		More images
Maison Thomas-Hunt et écurie Thomas-Fargues	24A, Rue Mont-Carmel; QC	46°48′39″N 71°12′25″W	Quebec (7221)		More images
Martello Tower 1		46°48′08″N 71°12′59″W	Federal (3663)		More images
Martello Tower 2	Wilfrid-Laurier and Tache; QC	46°48′00″N 71°13′00″W	Federal (4338)		More images
Martello Tower 4	Lavigueur Street; QC	46°48′00″N 71°13′00″W	Federal (4339)		More images
Mess Hall 2 and Shed	57-57A Saint-Louis Street; QC	46°48′39″N 71°12′30″W	Federal (4500)		More images
Monk House	59-61 Saint-Louis Street; QC	46°48′40″N 71°12′31″W	Federal (4795)		Upload Photo
Montmorency Park National Historic Site of Canada	Port-Dauphin and Cote de la Montagne Streets; QC	46°48′49″N 71°12′16″W	Federal (10404)		
Morrin College / Former Quebec Prison National Historic Site of Canada	44 Chaussee des Ecossais (formerly Saint-Stanislas Street); Quebec City QC	46°48′46″N 71°12′38″W	Federal (2197), Quebec (7629)		More images
Moulin à vent de l'Hôpital-Général-de-Québec	350, Boulevard Langelier; Quebec City QC	46°48′46″N 71°13′56″W	Quebec (10455)		More images
Mount Hermon Cemetery National Historic Site of Canada	1801, chemin Saint-Louis; Quebec City QC	46°46′43″N 71°14′48″W	Federal (12110)		More images
New Québec Custom House National Historic Site of Canada	130 Dalhousie; Quebec City QC	46°49′02″N 71°12′05″W	Federal (7641)		More images
Notre-Dame Roman Catholic Cathedral National Historic Site of Canada	Rue de Buade; Quebec City QC	46°48′50″N 71°12′24″W	Federal (17441), Quebec (14748)		
Notre-Dame-des-Victoires Church National Historic Site of Canada	32 Sous-le-Fort Street; Quebec City QC	46°48′46″N 71°12′10″W	Federal (15954)		
Old Customs House	101 Champlain Boulevard; QC	46°48′37″N 71°12′11″W	Federal (9725)		
Old Québec Custom House National Historic Site of Canada	101 Champlain Boulevard; Quebec City QC	46°48′37″N 71°12′11″W	Federal (13040)		More images
Pavillon Charles-Baillairgé	1, Avenue Wolfe-Montcalm; Quebec City QC	46°48′00″N 71°13′26″W	Quebec (14764)		
Presbytère de Notre-Dame-des-Victoires	32, Rue Sous-le-Fort; Quebec City QC	46°48′47″N 71°12′09″W	Quebec (14784)		More images
Québec Bridge National Historic Site of Canada	Route 175 across the Saint Lawrence River; Quebec City and Lévis QC	46°44′45″N 71°17′16″W	Federal (13400)		
Québec Citadel Classified Federal Heritage Building	Cote de la Citadelle; Quebec City QC	46°48′25″N 71°12′25″W	Federal (3349)		More images
Québec Citadel National Historic Site of Canada	Cote de la Citadelle; Quebec City QC	46°48′28″N 71°12′27″W	Federal (9524)		
Québec City Hall National Historic Site of Canada	2 Desjardins Street; Quebec City QC	46°48′50″N 71°12′28″W	Federal (7675)		More images
Québec Court House National Historic Site of Canada	12 Saint-Louis Street; Quebec City QC	46°48′44″N 71°12′23″W	Federal (12547)		More images
Québec Garrison Club National Historic Site of Canada	97 Saint-Louis Street; Quebec City QC	46°48′33″N 71°12′38″W	Federal (4423)		More images
Québec Martello Towers National Historic Site of Canada	Lavigueur Street; Quebec City QC	46°48′18″N 71°13′16″W	Federal (7676)		
Recruiting Centre	1048 St. Jean Street; Quebec City QC	46°48′48″N 71°12′44″W	Federal (10850)		
Saint-Louis Forts and Châteaux National Historic Site of Canada	1, Rue des Carrieres; Quebec City QC	46°48′40″N 71°12′18″W	Federal (13547)		
St. Louis Barracks	96 d'Auteuil Street; Quebec City QC	46°48′35″N 71°12′35″W	Federal (9820)		More images
Séminaire de Québec	1, Rue des Remparts; Quebec City QC	46°48′50″N 71°12′21″W	Federal (20106), Quebec (7034)		More images
Sewell House	87 St. Louis Street; Quebec City QC	46°48′35″N 71°12′37″W	Federal (11163)		
Sewell House National Historic Site of Canada	87 St. Louis Street; Quebec City QC	46°48′35″N 71°12′36″W	Federal (12800)		More images
Site du patrimoine de la Côte-des-Érables	Rue Côte-des-Érables near Boulevard Bastien; Quebec City QC	46°51′06″N 71°18′23″W	Quebec City municipality (10913)		More images
Site historique de la Visitation	2825, Chemin Sainte-Foy; QC	46°46′41″N 71°18′17″W	Quebec (10535)		
Site historique du Monastère-des-Augustines-de-l'Hôtel-Dieu-de-Québec	32, Rue Charlevoix; QC	46°48′55″N 71°12′38″W	Quebec (8079)		More images
Site historique et archéologique de l'Habitation-Samuel-De Champlain	Place Royale, parts of rues Saint-Pierre, Sous-le-Fort, and Notre-Dame; buildings atop the site include Maison Louis-Formel and l'église de Notre-Dame-des-Victoires; Quebec City QC	46°48′46″N 71°12′09″W	Quebec (13480)		Upload Photo
St. John Bastion Foundry	Bastion Saint-Jean; Quebec City QC	46°48′48″N 71°12′48″W	Federal (11234)		More images
Têtu House National Historic Site of Canada	25 Sainte-Genevieve Avenue; Quebec City QC	46°48′36″N 71°12′24″W	Federal (7528)		More images
Théâtre Capitole	968, Rue Saint-Jean; Quebec City QC	46°48′45″N 71°12′49″W	Quebec (7714)		More images
Ursuline Monastery National Historic Site of Canada	18 Donnacona Street; Quebec City QC	46°48′43″N 71°12′30″W	Federal (9517)		More images
Site historique de la Chute-Montmorency	Montmorency River; Boischatel QC	46°53′25″N 71°08′40″W	Quebec (4112)		
Hôpital général de Québec	260, Boulevard Langelier; Notre-Dame-des-Anges QC	46°48′52″N 71°14′54″W	Quebec (7958)		
Maison Woodbury-Matte	1528, Rue Saint-Paul; L'Ancienne-Lorette QC	46°47′33″N 71°21′26″W	Quebec (9550)		More images
Calvaire de Notre-Dame-de-l'Annonciation	Rue Notre-Dame; L'Ancienne-Lorette QC	46°48′02″N 71°21′27″W	Quebec (13344)		
Maison Soulard	11, Route 138; Neuville QC	46°43′29″N 71°32′16″W	Quebec (1734)		More images
Maison Quézel	514, Chemin du Roy; Saint-Augustin-de-Desmaures QC	46°43′36″N 71°31′56″W	Quebec (10874)		
Chapelle Saint-James	Chemin Saint-James; Lac-Beauport QC	46°57′09″N 71°17′06″W	Lac-Beauport municipality (8730)		More images
Maison Simons	95, Chemin du Brule; Lac-Beauport QC	46°56′46″N 71°18′10″W	Lac-Beauport municipality (8731)		More images
Chapelle Saint-Dunstan	Chemin de la Chapelle; Lac-Beauport QC	46°56′55″N 71°16′57″W	Lac-Beauport municipality (13119)		More images
Moulin Marcoux	1, Boulevard Notre-Dame, Pont-Rouge; QC	46°45′23″N 71°41′58″W	Quebec (4453)		More images
Site de pêche Déry	Rue Dery, Pont-Rouge; QC	46°44′38″N 71°41′42″W	Quebec (10170)		More images
Ensemble institutionnel de Pont-Rouge	Rue Dupont, Pont-Rouge; QC	46°45′21″N 71°41′46″W	Quebec (13736)		
Église Saint-Bartholomew	2327, Grand Rang, Saint-Raymond; QC	46°50′21″N 71°47′47″W	Quebec (7313)		More images
Chapelle du cimetière	Avenue Saint-Jacques, Saint-Raymond; QC	46°53′33″N 71°50′31″W	Quebec (8423)		More images
Chapelle Saint-Agricole	1 699, Rang Saguenay, Saint-Raymond; QC	47°01′36″N 71°50′55″W	Quebec (8831)		More images
Moulin du Gouffre	730, Rang Saint-Laurent, Baie-Saint-Paul; QC	47°30′54″N 70°29′54″W	Quebec (4930)		Upload Photo
Pont couvert de Saint-Placide-de-Charlevoix	Rang de Saint-Placide Sud, Baie-Saint-Paul; QC	47°24′30″N 70°37′04″W	Quebec (9780)		More images
Domaine Cimon	50, Rue Saint-Jean-Baptiste, Baie-Saint-Paul; QC	47°26′34″N 70°30′24″W	Quebec (10165)		
Chalet Pepper-Daly	Rue Saint-Edouard; Saint-Urbain QC	47°32′03″N 70°31′46″W	Quebec (12369)		Upload Photo
Église de Saint-Joseph	Rue de l'Eglise; Deschambault-Grondines QC	46°38′52″N 71°55′41″W	Quebec (11329)		
Chapelle de procession Saint-Roch	Avenue Royale; L'Ange-Gardien QC	46°54′54″N 71°05′54″W	Quebec (4934)		
Cap au Saumon Lighthouse	La Malbaie QC	47°46′14″N 69°54′18″W	Federal (20713)		
Sainte Anne Processional Chapel National Historic Site of Canada	714 Rue des Erables; Neuville QC	46°41′54″N 71°34′56″W	Federal (12910), Quebec (8304)		
La Fabrique National Historic Site of Canada	255-295 Boulevard Charest Est; Quebec QC	46°48′46″N 71°13′35″W	Federal (18950)		
Maison Félix-Bidégaré	13 Ruelle de l'Ancien-Chantier; Quebec QC	46°48′59″N 71°12′47″W	Quebec (7317)		
Maison Côté	3182 Avenue Royale; Saint-Ferreol-les-Neiges QC	47°06′39″N 70°51′42″W	Quebec (12386)		
Église de Saint-François	Chemin Royal; Saint-Francois-de-l'Ile-d'Orleans QC	47°00′07″N 70°48′46″W	Quebec (13863)		
Maison Louis-Pouliotte	918 Chemin Royal; Saint-Laurent-de-l'Ile-d'Orleans QC	46°52′24″N 70°58′53″W	Quebec (4565)		
Maison Leclerc	313 Chemin Royal; Saint-Pierre-de-l'Île-d'Orléans QC	46°52′10″N 71°06′21″W	Quebec (13158)		
Cap de la Tête au Chien Lighthouse	Saint-Simeon QC	47°54′40″N 69°48′21″W	Federal (20840)		Upload Photo
Église de Sainte-Famille	Chemin Royal; Sainte-Famille QC	46°58′25″N 70°57′43″W	Quebec (8860)		
Sillery Heritage Site (site patrimonial de Sillery)	Sainte-Foy–Sillery–Cap-Rouge; Ville de Québec QC	46°46′38″N 71°14′45″W	Federal (5572)		More images

== See also ==
- List of National Historic Sites of Canada in Quebec City
- Cultural heritage of Quebec
