= Saguenay–Lac-Saint-Jean =

Coordinates: 49.8667°N 71.7500°W

- Région
- Flag

- Saguenay–Lac-Saint-Jean in the province of Quebec.
- Country: Canada
- Province: Quebec

Government
  - Table régionale des élus (TRÉ) du Saguenay-Lac-Saint-Jean (Regional conference of elected officers): André Paradis (President)

Area
  - Total: 95,542.70 km^{2} (36,889.24 sq mi)

Population (2021)
  - Total: 275,552
  - Density: 2.88407/km^{2} (7.46971/sq mi)
- Time zone: UTC−5 (EST)
  - Summer (DST): UTC−4 (EDT)
- Website: Tourism Saguenay-Lac-Saint-Jean

Saguenay–Lac-Saint-Jean (French pronunciation: [saɡnɛ lak sɛ̃ ʒɑ̃], locally [saɡne lak sẽ ʒã]) is a region in Quebec, Canada on the Labrador Peninsula. It contains the Saguenay Fjord, the estuary of the Saguenay River, stretching through much of the region. It is also known as Sagamie in French, from the first part of "Saguenay" and the last part of "Piekouagami", the Innu name (meaning "flat lake") for Lac Saint-Jean, with the final "e" added to follow the model of other existing region names such as Mauricie, Témiscamie, Jamésie, and Matawinie. With a land area of 95,542.70 km^{2} (36,889.24 sq mi), Saguenay–Lac-Saint-Jean is the third-largest Quebec region after Nord-du-Québec and Côte-Nord. The region was created in 1966.

This region is bathed by two major watercourses, Lac Saint-Jean and the Saguenay River, both of which mark its landscape deeply and have been the main drives of its development in history. It is also irrigated by several other large watercourses. Bordered by forests and mountainous massifs, the southern portion of the region constitutes a fertile enclave in the Canadian Shield called the Saguenay Graben. Both the scenery and the cultural sites and activities of Saguenay–Lac-Saint-Jean attract tourists every year. Lac Saint-Jean is a popular vacation destination in the summer for residents of the more urban regions of Quebec.

== Etymology ==
The name Saguenay is possibly derived from the Innu word "Saki-nip" which means "where water flows out".

== Population ==
The population of the Saguenay–Lac-Saint-Jean region was 275,552 at the Canada 2021 Census, representing 3.2% of Quebec's population. It is concentrated primarily in three clusters: the city of Saguenay (pop. 144,723), the city of Alma (pop. 30,331) and the agglomeration of Roberval (pop. 9,840), Saint-Félicien (pop. 10,089) and Dolbeau-Mistassini (pop. 13,718). Saguenay, the region's largest city, is located slightly west of the fjord, mostly south of the river. It makes up 52.5% of the region's population.

== Flag ==
The flag was incorporated in 1938 on the centenary of the first settlers' arrival in 1838 and was created by Mgr. Victor Tremblay, a local historian. The four colours represent the four elements of the richness of Saguenay: the grey cross represents aluminum, which is an important product of local industry; the red border represents the inhabitants' labour; green, at the top represents the forest; and yellow, at the bottom, represents agriculture.

== Administrative divisions ==
Following the Saguenay municipal reorganization in 2002, the region now counts 49 municipalities (including unorganized territories). (Note: 2016 Census populations. Sources: Government of Quebec, Ministry of Municipal Affairs (MAMROT))

=== Regional county municipalities ===
- Le Fjord-du-Saguenay Regional County Municipality (pop. 21,600)
- Lac-Saint-Jean-Est Regional County Municipality (pop. 52,741)
- Le Domaine-du-Roy Regional County Municipality (pop. 31,285)
- Maria-Chapdelaine Regional County Municipality (pop. 24,793)

=== Equivalent territory ===
- Saguenay (pop. 144,746)

=== Native reserve ===
- Mashteuiatsh within Le Domaine-du-Roy, (pop. 2,213 Montagnais)

== Demographics ==
In the 2021 Census of Population conducted by Statistics Canada, the Saguenay–Lac-Saint-Jean region had a population of 275,552 living in 126,404 of its 138,331 total private dwellings, a change of −0.4% from its 2016 population of 276,368. With a land area of 95,542.70 km^{2} (36,889.24 sq mi), it had a population density of 2.9/km^{2} (7.5/sq mi) in 2021.

The median age is 47.2, as opposed to 41.6 for all of Canada. French was the mother tongue of 98.0% of residents in 2021. The next most common mother tongues were English at 0.6%, followed by Spanish at 0.4% and the related languages of Atikamekw and Innu at 0.3% total. 0.4% reported both English and French as their first language. Additionally there were 0.1% who reported both French and a non-official language as their mother tongue.

As of 2021, Indigenous peoples comprised 5.1% of the population and visible minorities contributed 1.5%. The largest visible minority groups in Saguenay–Lac-Saint-Jean are Black (0.7%), Arab (0.2%), and Latin American (0.2%). The region is home to 555 recent immigrants (i.e. those arriving between 2016 and 2021). 190 of them come from France, and 180 come from various African countries, with Cameroon leading at 75 recent immigrants.

In 2021, 73.4% of the population identified as Catholic, while 19.2% said they had no religious affiliation. Muslims were the largest religious minority, making up 0.3% of the population.

Counting both single and multiple responses, the most commonly identified ethnocultural ancestries were:

Ethnic origin	2021
Canadian	41.8%
French	19.4%
Québécois	15.8%
French Canadian	11.4%
First Nations	3.6%
Irish	2.0%
Innu	1.7%
Métis	1.6%
Scottish	1.2%
Acadian	1.0%

(Percentages may total more than 100% due to rounding and multiple responses).

Visible minority and Aboriginal population (Canada 2021 Census)
Population group		Population	% of total population
White		257,820	93.4%
Visible minority group Source:	South Asian	170	0.1%
Visible minority group Source:	Chinese	395	0.1%
Visible minority group Source:	Black	1,770	0.7%
Visible minority group Source:	Filipino	125	0%
Visible minority group Source:	Arab	490	0.2%
Visible minority group Source:	Latin American	620	0.2%
Visible minority group Source:	Southeast Asian	210	0.1%
Visible minority group Source:	West Asian	55	0%
Visible minority group Source:	Korean	30	0%
Visible minority group Source:	Japanese	25	0%
Visible minority group Source:	Visible minority, n.i.e.	70	0%
Visible minority group Source:	Multiple visible minority	155	0.1%
Total visible minority population		4,115	1.5%
Aboriginal group Source:	First Nations	6,885	2.6%
Aboriginal group Source:	Métis	5,790	2.2%
Aboriginal group Source:	Inuit	185	0.1%
Aboriginal group Source:	Aboriginal, n.i.e.	560	0.2%
Aboriginal group Source:	Multiple Aboriginal identity	200	0.1%
Total Aboriginal population		13,615	5.1%
Total population		275,550	100%

== Major communities ==
- Albanel
- Alma
- Dolbeau-Mistassini
- Hébertville
- Métabetchouan-Lac-à-la-Croix
- Normandin
- Roberval
- Saguenay
- Saint-Ambroise
- Saint-David-de-Falardeau
- Saint-Félicien
- Saint-Gédéon
- Saint-Honoré
- Saint-Prime

== School districts ==
Each school service centre (French: centre de services scolaire) give services to five school distincts of 20 in the region:

- Centre de services scolaire de la Jonquière
- Centre de services scolaire du Lac-Saint-Jean
- Centre de services scolaire du Pays-des-Bleuets (Maria-Chapdelaine, Le Domaine-du-Roy, Mashteuiatsh and Saint-Ludger-de-Milot)
- Centre de services scolaire des Rives-du-Saguenay (Le Fjord-du-Saguenay Regional County Municipality (except Larouche, Saint-Ambroise, Bégin), Sagard and Saguenay (except Jonquière)

The whole region is part of the anglophone district Central Quebec School Board.

== See also ==
- List of Quebec regions
- List of people from Saguenay-Lac-Saint-Jean
- List of historic places in Saguenay-Lac-Saint-Jean
