= Blanche River (Montmorency River tributary) =

- Location within Quebec
- Native name: Rivière Blanche (French)

Location
- Country: Canada
- Province: Quebec
- Region: Capitale-Nationale
- Regional County Municipality: La Côte-de-Beaupré Regional County Municipality
- Unorganized territory: Lac-Jacques-Cartier

Physical characteristics
- Source: Lac la Blanche
  - location: Lac-Jacques-Cartier
  - coordinates: 47.26725°N 71.10093°W
  - elevation: 853 m (2,799 ft)
- Mouth: Montmorency River
  - location: Lac-Jacques-Cartier
  - coordinates: 47.25833°N 71.1375°W
  - elevation: 560 m (1,840 ft)
- Length: 6.9 km (4.3 mi)

Basin features
- Tributaries
  - left: Unidentified stream

The Rivière Blanche (French pronunciation: [ʁivjɛʁ blɑ̃ʃ], lit. 'White River') is a tributary of the east bank of the Montmorency River. It flows in the unorganized territory of Lac-Jacques-Cartier, in the La Côte-de-Beaupré Regional County Municipality, in the administrative region of Capitale-Nationale, in the province of Quebec, in Canada.

This valley is served by two secondary forest roads going up each side of the course of the river; a third forest road serves the upper part. Forestry is the main economic activity in this valley; second, recreational tourism.

Because of its altitude, the surface of the upper part of the Blanche River is generally frozen from the end of November to the beginning of April; however, safe circulation on the ice is generally done from mid-December to the end of March. The lower part of the river course has a freezing period of about a week less than the upper part. The water level of the river varies with the seasons and the precipitation; the spring flood occurs in March or April.

== Geography ==
The Blanche River rises in Lac la Blanche (length: 0.9 kilometres (0.56 mi); altitude: 853 metres (2,799 ft)). The mouth of this lake is located at:

- 1.0 kilometre (0.62 mi) south-east of the limit of Montmorency Forest;
- 2.1 kilometres (1.3 mi) south of the limit of the Laurentides Wildlife Reserve;
- 3.0 kilometres (1.9 mi) west of the course of the Rivière des Neiges;
- 3.7 kilometres (2.3 mi) south-east of the summit of André-Lafond Mountain (altitude: 1,000 metres (3,300 ft));
- 3.9 kilometres (2.4 mi) north-east of the mouth of the Blanche river and the Montmorency River;
- 8.1 kilometres (5.0 mi) east of Route 175, connecting the town of Quebec to the town of Saguenay;
- 29.3 kilometres (18.2 mi) northwest of the northwest shore of the St. Lawrence River.

From the mouth of Lac la Blanche, the Blanche river descends on 6.9 kilometres (4.3 mi), with a drop of 293 metres (961 ft) according to the following segments:

- 1.8 kilometres (1.1 mi) north-west in an increasingly steep valley, passing between two mountains and entering Montmorency Forest, up to a bend in the river;
- 2.4 kilometres (1.5 mi) south-west in a valley between two mountains, to the outlet (coming from the west) of Lac Bédard;
- 2.7 kilometres (1.7 mi) first towards the south in a deep valley, forming a large S between two mountains, collecting two streams (coming from the east); then south-west in a steep drop by collecting a stream (coming from the east), to its mouth.

From the confluence of the Blanche river, the current flows over 58.9 kilometres (36.6 mi) generally south by the course of the Montmorency River, to the northwest bank of the St. Lawrence River.

== Toponymy ==
The toponyms "Rivière Blanche" and "Lac la Blanche" (head lake) are linked.

The toponym "rivière Blanche" was formalized on March 28, 1974 at the Commission de toponymie du Québec.

== See also ==
- La Côte-de-Beaupré Regional County Municipality
- Montmorency Forest
- Montmorency River
- List of rivers of Quebec

== Sources ==
- Charlevoix-Montmorency watershed organization (2015). Charlevoix-Montmorency water master plan (PDF). p. 75. Archived from the original (PDF) on 2016-11-25.
