= Rouge River =

Rouge River or River Rouge (French: Rivière Rouge, lit. 'Red River') may refer to rivers or places:

Canada:

- Rouge River (Ontario), a river in Toronto
  - Scarborough—Rouge River, an electoral district named after the river
- Rouge River (Laurentides), a tributary of the Ottawa River in western Quebec
  - Rivière-Rouge, a city named after the river
  - Rivière-Rouge Ecological Reserve, a protected area located in the Rivière Rouge region (Laurentides) of Quebec
- Rouge River (Beaurivage River tributary), Quebec
- Rouge River (Montmorency River tributary), in the Capitale-Nationale administrative region, Quebec
- Rouge River East, in the Capitale-Nationale administrative region, Quebec

United States:

- River Rouge (Michigan), a river in southeast Michigan
  - River Rouge, Michigan, a city named after the river
  - Ford River Rouge Complex, the giant Ford auto plant located on the river

Other places:

- Eau Rouge (Red Water), a stream in Belgium

== See also ==
- Red River (disambiguation)
- Rogue River (disambiguation)
- Rouge (disambiguation)
