= Rivière aux Pins (Montmorency River tributary) =

- Location within Quebec

Location
- Country: Canada
- Province: Quebec
- Region: Capitale-Nationale
- Regional County Municipality: La Jacques-Cartier Regional County Municipality

Physical characteristics
- Source: Forested creek
  - location: Stoneham-et-Tewkesbury
  - coordinates: 47°02′37″N 71°15′16″W
  - elevation: 438 m
- Mouth: Montmorency River
  - location: Sainte-Brigitte-de-Laval
  - coordinates: 46°59′07″N 71°11′50″W
  - elevation: 159 m
- Length: 14.14 km (8.79 mi)

Basin features
- Tributaries
  - left: (Upward from the mouth)
  - right: (Upward from the mouth) Lac du Capitaine, Lac des Coudres

The Rivière aux Pins (English: Pine River) is a tributary of the Montmorency River, which is a tributary of the north shore of the St. Lawrence River, flowing in Sainte-Brigitte-de-Laval, in the La Jacques-Cartier Regional County Municipality, in the administrative region of Capitale-Nationale, in the province of Quebec, in Canada.

The lower part of this valley is served by avenue Sainte-Brigitte, by rue des Monardes and by rue du Ruisseau. The upper part is served by a secondary forest road. Forestry is the main economic activity in this valley; second, recreational tourism.

Because of its altitude, the surface of the Richelieu River is generally frozen from the beginning of December until the end of March; however, safe traffic on the ice is generally from mid-December to mid-March. The water level of the river varies with the seasons and the precipitation; the spring flood occurs in March or April.

== Geography ==
The Rivière aux Pins rises from a small lake located 638 m above sea level in the mountains, 1.2 km south of Lac Turgeon which drains west into the Turgeon River.

Course of the river

From this head lake, the "rivière aux Pins" descends from the mountains in forest territory, over 12.9 km, with a drop of 238 m, according to the following segments:

- 480 m south to Lac au Pin (length: 0.8 km) it crosses. This lake is located 1.6 km south of Turgeon Lake;
- 1.6 km southeast to the mouth of a stream coming from the north;
- 1.9 km southeast, then south, to Lac des Pins, which the current crosses over 195 m. The name of this lake is associated with that of the river of the same name;
- 0.5 km south to the outlet of Lac des Coudres, coming from the west;
- 285 m south to the outlet of a stream from the east;
- 0.6 km southwest to the bay north of Lac Poulin;
- 420 m crossing Lac Poulin from north to east (length: 480 m from north to south). This last lake is fed from the south by the outlet of Capitaine lake (length: 870 m, oriented to the northeast);
- 1.2 km southeast to Lac à Théodore (length: 390 m) where a dam is built. The current crosses this lake for 260 m;
- 5.9 km southeast, crossing numerous falls and rapids to its mouth, on the east bank of the Montmorency River, in the municipality of Sainte-Brigitte-de-Laval. The mouth is located in an urban environment, south of the golf course, which is south of the village of Sainte-Brigitte-de-Laval.

Main hydrographic slopes

The main hydrographic slopes neighboring this river are:

- to the northwest: the Turgeon River which is a tributary of the Huron River which is a tributary of the Saint-Charles River;
- to the west: the Yellow River and the Waterloo River;
- to the northeast: the Lépine river which is a tributary of the Saint-Adolphe river which is a tributary of the Montmorency River;
- to the east: the Richelieu river which is a tributary of the Montmorency River. The mouth of the Richelieu River is 0.9 km upstream of the Rivière aux Pins;
- to the south: the Euclid stream, the mouth of which flows into the Montmorency River 2.0 km downstream from the mouth of the Aux Pins river.

From the confluence of the "rivière aux Pins", the current flows over 18.0 kilometres (11.2 mi) generally southward along the Montmorency river, to the northwest shore of the St. Lawrence river.

== Toponymy ==
The designation "Rivière aux Pins" evokes the fact that in XIXth pines were present on the territory around this river; this species was rather rare elsewhere in the area belonging to Séminaire de Québec.

Five species of such conifers, among 28 species, grow in Quebec. As part of the genus Pinus and of the family Pinaceae, the pines consist of the following main species: Scots pine, hard pine (Pinus rigida), jack pine (Pinus banksiana or divaricata), red pine (Pinus resinosa) and white pine (Pinus strobus).

Depending on the species, pine is used in particular for the construction of buildings, rail tracks, poles, stilts, exterior and interior woodwork, the manufacture of pulp, the manufacture of musical instruments. Pine is also used as firewood. Under the French Regime, pine wood was used for the construction of Royal Navy vessels, notably the masts. In the mid-XIXth and XXth, an army of loggers took care of the felling of the pines, and the transport of wood on forest roads and the transport by floating to sawmills or to paper mills. The exploitation of pine contributed to the colonization of Mauricie, the Gatineau Valley, Lac-Saint-Jean and Abitibi-Témiscamingue, in particular.

The toponym "Rivière des Pins" was formalized on February 4, 1982, at the Place Names Bank of the Commission de toponymie du Québec.

== See also ==
- Sainte-Brigitte-de-Laval, a municipality
- La Jacques-Cartier Regional County Municipality
- Capitale-Nationale, an administrative region
- Montmorency River
- St. Lawrence River
- Montmorency Forest
- List of rivers of Quebec
