= Montmorency Lake =

Lake in Quebec, Canada

Lac Montmorency
- Location in Quebec
- Location: Lac-Jacques-Cartier, La Côte-de-Beaupré Regional County Municipality (MRC), Capitale-Nationale, Quebec, Canada
- Coordinates: 47°34′30″N 71°06′20″W
- Lake type: Natural
- Primary inflows: (Clockwise from the mouth) Discharge of Lac Pit, discharge from a marsh lake, discharge of an unidentified lake.
- Primary outflows: Montmorency River
- Basin countries: Canada
- Max. length: 880 m (0.55 mi)
- Max. width: 0.170 km (0.106 mi)
- Surface elevation: 896 m (2,940 ft)

Montmorency Lake, or Lac Montmorency, is a fresh water body located in the unorganized territory Lac-Jacques-Cartier, in the La Côte-de-Beaupré Regional County Municipality, in the administrative region of Capitale-Nationale, in the province of Quebec, in Canada. It is part of the Laurentides Wildlife Reserve.

Lac Montmorency (altitude: 896 m) is one of the sources of the Montmorency River. In the past, forestry was the main economic activity in the sector. The surface of the lake is generally frozen from mid-November to April; however, the period of safe circulation on the ice is from mid-December to the end of March.

== Geography ==
Lac Montmorency is located 1.5 km southwest of Nadreau Lake (altitude: 838 m), 4.4 km northeast of Lac Hermine, 5.0 km west from Malbaie Lake, 6.9 km east of Jacques-Cartier Lake and 0.3 km northeast of Maltais Lake.

The main neighboring hydrographic slopes are:

- to the south: the outlet of Maltais Lake (altitude: 875 m);
- to the west: the outlet of Boulet Lake (altitude: 920 m);
- to the northeast: the slope of Nadreau Lake (altitude: 838 m) and its tributary Lake Plamondon (altitude: 844 m);
- to the southeast: the Montmorency River.

A mountain whose summit reaches 994 m separates Lake Montmorency and Lake Nadreau, which constitutes the source of the Jacques-Cartier River. Another 1069 m mountain separates Lac Montmorency with Lac Currier (located 2.25 km to the north).

The Montmorency Lake receives the discharge from Pit Lake outlet (altitude: 918 m) on the west side and a 1.7 km stream coming from a small marshy lake (altitude: 929 m) to the northwest. Lake Montmorency takes the form of a crescent open to the southeast, in order to border a mountain whose summit is 970 m. Swampy areas surround the eastern, northern and western areas of the lake. Its mouth is located at the bottom of the southern point. Its outlet flows a priori towards the south for 1.2 km to the outlet of the Pond of the Ancolies (altitude: 844 m). Then the outlet descends for one kilometer to the outlet of Lake Maltais. Then the river flows south-east on a last segment of 320 m to flow into the Montmorency River. The outlet of Lac Boulet is located a hundred meters downstream.

The mouth of the outlet of Lac Montmorency is located 2.2 km downstream from the outlet of Lac Alyse or 3.1 km downstream from Lac Subulé which collects the waters of Lac Moran. This hydrographic slope of this sector is located very close to the watershed between the Jacques-Cartier, Montmorency and Malbaie rivers.

== Toponymy ==
The toponyms of the Montmorency River and of Montmorency lake are linked, because the latter constitutes one of the head lakes of the river, with the lakes Subule (altitude: 842 m), Moran (altitude: 847 m) and Alyse (altitude: 893 m).

The toponym "Lac Montmorency" was formalized on December 5, 1968 at the Place Names Bank of the Commission de toponymie du Québec.

== See also ==
- Montmorency River
- Lac-Jacques-Cartier, an unorganized territory
- La Côte-de-Beaupré Regional County Municipality
- Laurentides Wildlife Reserve
