= Lac des Neiges =

Lake in Lac-Jacques-Cartier, Quebec, Canada

- Location in Quebec
- Location: Lac-Jacques-Cartier, La Côte-de-Beaupré Regional County Municipality, Capitale-Nationale, Quebec, Canada
- Coordinates: 47°28′30″N 71°02′05″W
- Lake type: Natural
- Primary inflows: 22 unidentified streams and outlet of Boily Lake.
- Primary outflows: Rivière des Neiges
- Basin countries: Canada
- Max. length: 14 km (8.7 mi)
- Max. width: 1.1 km (0.68 mi)
- Surface area: 7.0 ha (0.027 sq mi)
- Surface elevation: 842 m (2,762 ft)

The Lac des Neiges (English: Lake of Snow) is a freshwater body located in the unorganized territory of Lac-Jacques-Cartier, in the La Côte-de-Beaupré Regional County Municipality, in the administrative region of Capitale-Nationale, in the province of Quebec, in Canada.

The hydrographic side of this lake is mainly served by the forest road R0308 coming from the South and passing on the east side of the lake. A secondary forest road runs along the east shore to serve a dozen chalets in the mouth of the lake and the area north of the upper part of the Rivière des Neiges.

Because of its altitude, the surface of Lac des Neiges is generally frozen from the end of November to the beginning of April; however, safe circulation on the ice is generally done from mid-December to the end of March. The water level is controlled by a dam built at its mouth.

== Geography ==
Enclosed between the mountains, this 7 square kilometres (2.7 sq mi) and 14 kilometres (8.7 mi) in length is about 70 kilometres (43 mi) north of Quebec city in Forêt Montmorency, in Laurentides Wildlife Reserve. This lake is located 1.8 kilometres (1.1 mi) east of Fradette Lake which is crossed from south to north by the Malbaie River and 2.5 kilometres (1.6 mi) south of Malbaie Lake (La Côte-de-Beaupré).

This lake turns out to be the source of the Rivière des Neiges. The surface of the lake is at 842 metres (2,762 ft) above sea level. Lac des Neige has a marsh area in the north and northeast.

The main mountain peaks around Lac des Neiges are:

- North side: two peaks at 979 metres (3,212 ft) each;
- East side (described from north to south): a summit at 1,019 metres (3,343 ft), a summit at 984 metres (3,228 ft), Mont Francine-C.McKenzie at 990 metres (3,250 ft), a vertex at 1,003 metres (3,291 ft);
- South side: a summit at 1,029 metres (3,376 ft);
- West side (described from north to south): summit at 969 metres (3,179 ft), Mont Pierre-Dugua-De Mons at 1,007 metres (3,304 ft), Mont de la Québécoises at 1,110 metres (3,640 ft), a summit at 1,099 metres (3,606 ft), a summit at 1,030 metres (3,380 ft), Mont Jean-Hubert at 1,061 metres (3,481 ft), a peak at 930 metres (3,050 ft) and another at 930 metres (3,050 ft).

The summit of Mont Belle Fontaine, the highest in the reserve, peaks at 1,148 metres (3,766 ft) at 5.0 kilometres (3.1 mi) southwest of Lac des Neiges. Formerly a fire tower was installed there.

With an average flow, the Rivière des Neiges weaves 40 km in a southerly direction to empty into the Montmorency River. The Rivière des Neiges, whose bed is very rocky, flows at the bottom of a glacial valley which becomes more and more steep and spectacular as one approaches the point of confluence. Its low water level does not allow navigation, except for the kayak descent during the spring flood.

== Lac-des-Neiges Ancient Forest ==
Located about 70 km north of Quebec, Lac-des-Neiges has an ancient forest spread over three sites: on the west shore of Lac des Neiges (facing the mouth of the lake), on the north shore of the dam of head of the rivière des Neiges and on the west bank of the Rivière des Neiges below Lac English. Covering 408 hectares (1,010 acres), this ancient forest is found in the bioclimatic subdomain of the eastern white birch fir forest.

The last great ice age, which would have ended about 10,000 years ago, left significant glacial deposits in this area; these deposition layers generally have a thickness of 25 centimetres (9.8 in).

The main feature of this ancient forest is the black spruce fir tree, some trees of which are 200 years old. Among the various species of trees populating this ancient forest, the fir is dominant there because of the cool and very humid climate. In addition, the mountainous and rocky relief generates a low density of the dominant cover; tree trunks generally have a low height.

So far, severe natural disturbances (forest fires, insect epidemics, high winds and lightning strikes) have not affected this exceptional forest ecosystem; this state of natural preservation is rather rare for such an old coniferous forest. In addition, human activities have had little impact on this natural territory, particularly because of its relief and its difficulty of access.

Generally, the forests north of Quebec City, in the high foothills of the Laurentians, are unlikely to evolve to very advanced stages; this anticipation stems from the fact that these forests have been exploited by silviculture since the middle of the 19th century and the non-harvested woody material is often decimated by epidemics of the spruce budworm. However, these epidemics help to rejuvenate forest stands.

This protected forest area of Lac-des-Neiges is home to Leptoporus mollis, a fungus, and Anastrophyllum hellerianum, a liverwort. Studies on the ancient forests of Europe often refer to these two species which are associated with the large, little degraded woody debris of the Laurentides; Once dominant in this area, these species have become rare. Consequently, the researchers recommended to government authorities that this typical Lac-des-Neiges forest be preserved by granting it the status of old growth forest.

This forest area also includes black spruce and white birch, which are widely distributed in the territory but in low density. These tree species are found to be denser only in the few sites that have been affected by larger windfall. Fir trees are generally favored by plant regeneration; and occasionally black spruce and white birch. The herbaceous vegetation is generally dense; it mainly includes Rubus pubescens and Gymnocarpium disjuncta. The moss bed is dominated in places by Pleurozium schreberi and Hylocomium splendens.

== Toponymy ==
Lac des Neiges appears in historical documents from the beginning of early 18th century, among others in 1731 on a map of Father Pierre-Michel Laure.

During the period of abstinence and deprivation of Lent (before Christian Easter), the residents of the Côte-de-Beaupré went up the lake's emissary rivers, the Montmorency rivers, by ice roads and des Neiges, to go fishing on Lac des Neiges. They fished there for lake trout, formerly called "forked tail" by French Canadians, some of which could weigh up to 10 kilograms (22 lb). After good catches, these fishermen piled up on sleds these large gray trout like a wooden cord.

Located near the lake, a fishing camp of the government of Quebec is reserved exclusively for dignitaries and guests of the government; formerly, this lake was designated "Lake of Ministers", because of the exclusivity of the camp and the fishing rights on this lake.

The toponymic designation used is explained by the presence of snow on the surrounding peaks for a greater part of the year than in the surrounding valleys. In spring, the melting of this snow contributes to feeding the lake. This one, called Oohkiahi by the Wendats (Hurons), is perched about 850 m above sea level.

The toponym "Lac des Neiges" was formalized on December 5, 1968, at the Commission de toponymie du Québec.
