= Savane River (Rivière des Neiges tributary) =

- Location within Quebec
- Native name: Rivière Savane (French)

Location
- Country: Canada
- Province: Quebec
- Region: Capitale-Nationale
- RCM: La Côte-de-Beaupré Regional County Municipality
- Unorganized territory: Lac-Jacques-Cartier

Physical characteristics
- Source: Confluence of two forest streams
  - location: Lac-Jacques-Cartier Unorganized Territory, La Côte-de-Beaupré Regional County Municipality, Capitale-Nationale, Quebec, Canada
  - coordinates: 47°25′33″N 70°55′49″W
  - elevation: 850 m (2,790 ft)
- Mouth: Montmorency River
  - location: Lac-Jacques-Cartier Unorganized Territory
  - coordinates: 47°19′12″N 71°00′03″W
  - elevation: 650 m (2,130 ft)
- Length: 17.3 km (10.7 mi)
- Discharge
  - minimum: March
  - maximum: May

Basin features
- Tributaries
  - left: (upward from the mouth) Ruisseau Sauvage which turns out to be the outlet of a set of three lakes including Sauvage and La Hache, outlet of lac à l'Île, two unidentified streams, outlet of Creux lake and Scotty lake, unidentified stream.
  - right: (upward from the mouth) O'Grady stream, unidentified stream, unidentified stream.

The Savane River is a tributary of the east bank of the rivière des Neiges, flowing in the unorganized territory of Lac-Jacques-Cartier, in the La Côte-de-Beaupré Regional County Municipality, in the administrative region of Capitale-Nationale, in the province of Quebec, in Canada.

The upper part of this river begins south of Lac Allioux in the Laurentides Wildlife Reserve; then the course of the river flows outside and more or less parallel to the limit of the reserve. The upper part of this river flows more or less in parallel with the Portage brook flowing north crossing Lac Savane then borrowing the course of the rivière Savane du Nord which is a tributary of the Sainte-Anne River.

This valley is mainly served by a secondary forest road going up the south-eastern bank of the Savane river. This route is mainly used for forestry and recreational tourism activities.

Because of its altitude, the surface of the upper Savane River is generally frozen from the beginning of December until the end of March; however, safe traffic on the ice is generally from mid-December to mid-March. The water level of the river varies with the seasons and the precipitation; the spring flood occurs in March or April.

== Geography ==
The Savane River takes its source at the confluence of two mountain streams, 0.6 kilometres (0.37 mi) west of the limit of the Laurentides Wildlife Reserve. This source is located 2.3 kilometres (1.4 mi) west of Portage brook, 12.8 kilometres (8.0 mi) northeast of the confluence of the Savane river and the rivière des Neiges, 30.4 kilometres (18.9 mi) west of the west bank of the St. Lawrence River and 62.1 kilometres (38.6 mi) north of the mouth of the Montmorency River.

From its source, the course of the Savane river descends on 17.3 kilometres (10.7 mi) entirely in the forest zone, with a drop of 200 metres (660 ft), according to the following segments:

- 3.3 kilometres (2.1 mi) south-west bypassing a mountain whose summit reaches 1,061 metres (3,481 ft), then branching south-west through a marsh area at the end of the segment, to a stream (coming from the west);
- 1.7 kilometres (1.1 mi) towards the south-east by first crossing an area of marsh, to a stream (coming from the east);
- 3.5 kilometres (2.2 mi) towards the south by first forming a hook towards the east, then by forming a loop towards the east, collecting a stream (coming from the northwest) and another ( from the east), to a small dam built at the mouth of a small lake;
- 3.3 kilometres (2.1 mi) to the south passing between two mountains and collecting two streams (coming from the east), up to the outlet of Lac à l'Île (coming from the east);
- 4.3 kilometres (2.7 mi) to the south in an increasingly deep valley, collecting the O'Grady stream (coming from the northwest) and gathering a mountain stream (coming from the east), up to a bend corresponding to a Sauvage stream (coming from the east);
- 1.2 kilometres (0.75 mi) to the west in a deep valley, to its mouth.

From the confluence of the Camp Brûlé river, the current descends on 19.8 kilometres (12.3 mi) southwards the course of the Rivière des Neiges, then flows on 46.3 kilometres (28.8 mi) generally towards the south by the course of the Montmorency river, to the northwest shore of the Saint-Laurent river.

== Toponymy ==
The river toponym of Camp Brûlé was formalized on December 13, 1996, at the Commission de toponymie du Québec.

== See also ==
- La Côte-de-Beaupré Regional County Municipality
- Lac-Jacques-Cartier, an unorganized territory
- Montmorency River
- Rivière des Neiges
- List of rivers of Quebec

== Sources ==
- Charlevoix-Montmorency watershed organization (2014). OBV Charlevoix-Montmorency. 2014. Water master plan for the Charlevoix-Montmorency water zone. Chapter 2. Watershed of the Montmorency river. Submitted to the Ministry of Sustainable Development, Environment and the Fight against Climate Change. August 2014. 903 pages. p. 75.
