= Richelieu River (Montmorency River tributary) =

- Location within Quebec

Location
- Country: Canada
- Province: Quebec
- Region: Capitale-Nationale
- Regional County Municipality: La Jacques-Cartier Regional County Municipality
- Municipality: Sainte-Brigitte-de-Laval

Physical characteristics
- Source: Confluence of two streams
  - location: Sainte-Brigitte-de-Laval
  - coordinates: 47°02′35″N 71°12′07″W
  - elevation: 489 m
- Mouth: Montmorency River
  - location: Sainte-Brigitte-de-Laval
  - coordinates: 46°59′39″N 71°11′43″W
  - elevation: 200 m
- Length: 7.2 km (4.5 mi)

Basin features
- Tributaries
  - left: (Upward from the mouth) Discharge from an unidentified lake
  - right: (Upward from the mouth) Discharge from an unidentified small lake, unidentified stream, unidentified stream, unidentified stream, discharge from an unidentified lake, unidentified stream.

The Richelieu River is a tributary of the west bank of the Montmorency River. This watercourse flows on the north shore of the Saint-Laurent river, in the municipality of Sainte-Brigitte-de-Laval, in the La Jacques-Cartier Regional County Municipality, in the administrative region of Capitale-Nationale, in the province of Quebec, in Canada.

The lower part of this valley is served by avenue Sainte-Brigitte and by rue Auclair. The upper part is served by a secondary forest road. Forestry is the main economic activity in this valley; recreational tourism, second.

Because of its altitude, the surface of the Richelieu River is generally frozen from the beginning of December until the end of March; however, safe circulation on the ice is generally done from mid-December to mid-March. The water level of the river varies with the seasons and the precipitation; the spring flood occurs in March or April.

== Geography ==
The Richelieu River takes its source at the confluence of two forest and mountain streams (altitude: 489 metres (1,604 ft)), on the north flank of the Montagne à Deux Têtes, either:

- 0.8 kilometres (0.50 mi) north-west of the summit of the Mountain of Two Heads;
- 1.4 kilometres (0.87 mi) west of a curve in the course of the rivière à l'Île;
- 3.8 kilometres (2.4 mi) west of Lac Turgeon which is crossed by the Turgeon River;
- 5.5 kilometres (3.4 mi) north-west of the confluence of the Richelieu river and the Montmorency River.

Course of the Richelieu river

From its source, the Richelieu River descends from the mountains into forest territory, flowing over 7.2 kilometres (4.5 mi), with a drop of 289 metres (948 ft), according to the following segments:

- 2.9 kilometres (1.8 mi) south with a steep drop, then south-east, to a stream (coming from the west);
- 2.9 kilometres (1.8 mi) south-east to a stream (coming from the west);
- 0.7 kilometres (0.43 mi) south across Goudreault Lake (length: 0.24 kilometres (0.15 mi); altitude: 244 metres (801 ft)) which is located in the village of Sainte-Brigitte-de-Laval, to its mouth;
- 0.7 kilometres (0.43 mi) to the south by crossing the village of Sainte-Brigitte-de-Laval, branching east by crossing a series of rapids, to its mouth.

From the confluence of the Richelieu river, the current flows over 17.0 kilometres (10.6 mi) generally south by the course of the Montmorency river, to the northwest shore of the Saint-Laurent river.

== Toponymy ==
The toponym "Richelieu River" was formalized on December 5, 1968 at the Place Names Bank of the Commission de toponymie du Québec.

== See also ==
- Sainte-Brigitte-de-Laval, a municipality
- La Jacques-Cartier Regional County Municipality
- Capitale-Nationale, an administrative region
- Montmorency River
- St. Lawrence River
- List of rivers of Quebec
