= Malbaie Lake (La Côte-de-Beaupré) =

Lake in Lac-Jacques-Cartier, Quebec, Canada

- Location in Quebec
- Location: La Côte-de-Beaupré Regional County Municipality (MRC), Capitale-Nationale, Quebec, Canada
- Coordinates: 47.56472°N 71.00278°W
- Lake type: Natural
- Primary inflows: Malbaie River
- Primary outflows: Malbaie River
- Basin countries: Canada
- Max. length: 4.1 km (2.5 mi)
- Max. width: 2.1 km (1.3 mi)
- Surface elevation: 825 m (2,707 ft)
- Islands: 2

The Malbaie (French: Lac Malbaie) is a freshwater body located in the administrative region of Capitale-Nationale, in the province of Quebec, in Canada. Lac Malbaie straddles the regional county municipalities (RCMs) of:

- La Côte-de-Beaupré Regional County Municipality: the unorganized territory of Lac-Jacques-Cartier;
- Charlevoix Regional County Municipality: the unorganized territory of Lac-Pikauba.

Lac Malbaie is the main head lake of the Malbaie River. This mountain lake is entirely located in an area where forestry has always been the predominant economic activity. In XIXth, recreotourism activities took off. Due to the altitude, this lake is normally frozen from late October to early May; however, the safe period for traffic on the ice is usually November to April.

The forest road that follows the Jacques-Cartier River valley provides access to Lake Malbaie and Grands-Jardins National Park.

== Geography ==
Lac Malbaie (altitude: 825 m) is located 3.2 km south of Lac à Jack (altitude: 820 m), 2.1 km north of lac des Neiges (altitude: 846), 4.3 km south of Fronsac Lake (altitude: 820 m), 39 km northwest of Baie Saint-Paul and 61.5 km north of Sainte-Anne-de-Beaupré. This lake is part of the Laurentides Wildlife Reserve.

The main hydrographic slopes near Lac Malbaie are:

- to the east: the "Grande Coulée stream", a tributary of the Sainte-Anne River (Beaupré),
- to the west: the Montmorency River (whose head lake is Moran lake),
- to the northwest: the Jacques-Cartier River (whose head lake is Nadreau Lake),
- to the north: Jack's brook and the Malbaie River,
- to the south: the rivière des Neiges (whose head lake is Lac des neiges).

The "Petit lac Tristan" (altitude: 893 m) turns out to be the head lake of the Malbaie River. It is located in a marshy area in a small valley in the high mountains. It discharges to the north where the water flows for 1.0 km through swamps to Lake Tristan (1.8 km long: altitude: 883 m) which the current crosses over its full length from south to north. This last lake is also surrounded by swamps. The discharge continues for 3.0 km north to Lake Gamache (0.86 km long; altitude: 866 m) which the current crosses from south to north for 0.6 km. This last lake has a large central island.

From Lac Gamache, the water flows north for 1.4 km to the outlet of Lac Lamfort (altitude: 929 km). From there, the Malbaie River descends 5.7 km to Lac Fradette (2.5 km long, facing northeast: altitude: 838 m), which the current crosses over its full length. Lac Frenette receives from the northwest the waters of Lakes Carroll (altitude: 851 m), Milton (875 m) and Brunette (842 m). From the mouth of Lac Fradette, the river flows 2.4 km northeast to Lac Malbaie. The current of the Malbaie River crosses this lake from south to north for 2.3 km.

The mouth of Lac Malbaie is located to the north. The waters of the Malbaie River then flow northeast for 3.8 km to Ruisseau à Jack, which forms the outlet of a series of lakes including Lac à Jack, Lac Fronsac and Petit Lac à Jack (altitude: 820 m). The next 6.4 km segment of the Malbaie River route constitutes the southern limit of the Grands-Jardins National Park with the Laurentides Wildlife Reserve. The Malbaie river continues its course towards the east, going up a priori towards the north, then by bifurcating towards the south to go to flow in La Malbaie in the Saint Lawrence River.

== Toponymy ==
On a 1852 map of provincial surveyor Frederic William Blaiklock, the spelling of this lake is "Mal-Bay". The map of the Laurentides National Park, published in 1954, refers to "Grand L. Malbaie". This toponym also appears on other maps published in 1929, 1950 and 1958.

The toponym "Lac Malbaie" was formalized on December 5, 1968 at the Place Names Bank of the Commission de toponymie du Québec.

== Related articles ==
- Lac-Pikauba, an unorganized territory
- Lac-Jacques-Cartier, an unorganized territory
- Charlevoix Regional County Municipality
- La Côte-de-Beaupré Regional County Municipality
- Laurentides Wildlife Reserve
- Malbaie River
