= Richelieu =

Richelieu (UK: /ˈrɪʃəljɜː/, US: /-l(j)uː/; French: [ʁiʃ(ə)ljø]) may refer to:

== People ==
- Cardinal Richelieu (Armand-Jean du Plessis, 1585–1642), Louis XIII's chief minister
- Alphonse-Louis du Plessis de Richelieu (1582–1653), French Carthusian bishop and Cardinal
- Louis François Armand du Plessis, duc de Richelieu (1696–1788), marshal of France, grandnephew of the cardinal
- Emmanuel-Armand de Richelieu, duc d'Aiguillon (1720–1782), statesman, nephew of the marshal
- Armand-Emmanuel du Plessis, Duc de Richelieu, (1766–1822), statesman, grandson of the marshal
- Duke of Richelieu, a title in the peerage of France created for Cardinal Richelieu
- Andreas du Plessis de Richelieu (1852–1932), Danish naval officer and businessman
- Richelieu Levoyer (1930–2015), politician of the Republic of Ecuador

== Places ==
- Richelieu, Kentucky, United States
- Richelieu, Quebec, Canada
- Richelieu (federal electoral district), Quebec
- Richelieu (provincial electoral district), Quebec
- Richelieu (Province of Canada electoral district), Quebec (1841–1867)
- Richelieu River, Quebec
- Richelieu River (Montmorency River tributary), in La Jacques-Cartier Regional County Municipality, Capitale-Nationale, Quebec, Canada
- Richelieu, Indre-et-Loire, France

== Ships ==
- French ironclad Richelieu (1873)
- French battleship Richelieu (1939)
- French ship Richelieu
- French aircraft carrier Charles de Gaulle, originally named Richelieu
- Richelieu (laker), a lake freighter for Canada Steamship Lines

== Entertainment ==
- Richelieu (novel), a novel written by George Payne Rainsford James, 1829
- Richelieu (play), a play written by Edward Bulwer-Lytton, 1839
- Richelieu (1914 film), a film based on the play
- Richelieu (2023 film), also called Temporaries, a Canadian drama film directed by Pier-Philippe Chevigny

== Other ==
- The French term for Oxford shoes
