= Rivière du Camp Brûlé =

- Location within Quebec

Location
- Country: Canada
- Province: Quebec
- Region: Capitale-Nationale
- RCM: La Côte-de-Beaupré Regional County Municipality
- Unorganized territory: Lac-Jacques-Cartier

Physical characteristics
- Source: Little unidentified lake in mountain
  - location: Lac-Jacques-Cartier Unorganized Territory
  - coordinates: 47°16′15″N 70°56′24″W
  - elevation: 1,016 m (3,333 ft)
- Mouth: Rivière des Neiges
  - location: Lac-Jacques-Cartier Unorganized Territory
  - coordinates: 47°12′35″N 71°04′02″W
  - elevation: 480 m (1,570 ft)
- Length: 16.5 km (10.3 mi)
- Basin size: 28.5 km^{2} (11.0 sq mi)
- Discharge
  - minimum: March
  - maximum: May

Basin features
- Tributaries
  - left: (upward from the mouth) Discharge from an unidentified small lake, Faith brook, Georges brook, Second Lynch lake outlet,
  - right: (upward from the mouth) Six unidentified streams.

The rivière du Camp Brûlé (English: burnt camp river) is a tributary of the east bank of the rivière des Neiges, flowing in the unorganized territory of Lac-Jacques-Cartier, in the La Côte-de-Beaupré Regional County Municipality, in the administrative region of Capitale-Nationale, in the province of Quebec, in Canada.

This valley is mainly served by a secondary forest road going up the south-eastern bank of the "rivière du Camp Brûlé". This route is mainly used for forestry and recreational tourism activities.

Because of its altitude, the surface of the upper part of the rivière du Camp Brûlé is generally frozen from the beginning of December until the end of March; however, safe traffic on the ice is generally from mid-December to mid-March. The water level of the river varies with the seasons and the precipitation; the spring flood occurs in March or April.

== Geography ==
The "rivière du Camp Brûlé" originates from a small mountain lake, 8.8 kilometres (5.5 mi) southeast of the limit of the Laurentides Wildlife Reserve. This source is located 5.1 kilometres (3.2 mi) south-west of the course of the Brûlée River, 11.8 kilometres (7.3 mi) to the north-east of the confluence of the "rivière du Camp Brûlé" and the Rivière des Neiges, 23.9 kilometres (14.9 mi) west of the west bank of the Saint Lawrence River and 45.5 kilometres (28.3 mi) north of the mouth of the Montmorency River.

From its source, the course of the rivière du Camp Brûlé descends on 16.5 kilometres (10.3 mi) entirely in the forest zone, with a drop of 536 metres (1,759 ft) according to the following segments:

Upper part of the rivière du Camp Brûlé (segment of 8.9 kilometres (5.5 mi))

- 2.8 kilometres (1.7 mi) to the southeast then crossing 0.4 kilometres (0.25 mi) on Lake Lynch Number Three (length: 0.6 kilometres (0.37 mi); altitude: 839 metres (2,753 ft)) south-west to its mouth;
- 2.1 kilometres (1.3 mi) towards the south-west, in particular by crossing Lake Lynch Number Three (length: 1.1 kilometres (0.68 mi); altitude: 817 metres (2,680 ft)), formerly designated "Lac Barat", up to its mouth;
- 1.6 kilometres (0.99 mi) to the southwest crossing a small lake, then collecting a stream (coming from the north), to the north shore of Premier lac Lync, formerly designated "Lac Patin";
- 0.8 kilometres (0.50 mi) south-west across First Lynch Lake (altitude: 736 metres (2,415 ft)) over its full length, to its mouth. Note: This atypically shaped lake is surrounded by marshes on its north shore and on its southeast shore; it receives on the east side the discharge of Second Lynch Lake, formerly designated "Lac Turpin";
- 1.6 kilometres (0.99 mi) towards the south by crossing a small lake which collects a stream (coming from the west), then a second small lake which collects a stream (coming from the east), until Georges stream (coming from the East and constituting the outlet of Lac Georges and Lac la Charité);

Lower part of the rivière du Camp Brûlé (segment of 7.6 kilometres (4.7 mi))

- 5.4 kilometres (3.4 mi) towards the south-west in an increasingly deep valley, crossing two series of rapids, collecting a stream (coming from the north), then bending towards the south by collecting the stream Faith (coming from the east), up to a bend corresponding to an intermittent stream (coming from the east);
- 2.2 kilometres (1.4 mi) to the west in a well-boxed valley, collecting the discharge (coming from the south) of an unidentified lake and crossing a series of rapids, to its mouth.

From the confluence of the Camp Brûlé river, the current descends on 4.9 kilometres (3.0 mi) southwards the course of the Rivière des Neiges, then flows on 46.3 kilometres (28.8 mi) generally towards the south by the course of the Montmorency River, up to the northwest shore of the Saint-Laurent river.

== Toponymy ==
The river toponym of "rivière du Camp" Brûlé was formalized on December 5, 1968 at the Commission de toponymie du Québec.

== See also ==
- La Côte-de-Beaupré Regional County Municipality
- Lac-Jacques-Cartier, an unorganized territory
- Montmorency River
- Rivière des Neiges
- List of rivers of Quebec

== Sources ==
- Charlevoix-Montmorency watershed organization (2014). OBV Charlevoix-Montmorency. 2014. Water master plan for the Charlevoix-Montmorency water zone. Chapter 2. Watershed of the Montmorency river. Submitted to the Ministry of Sustainable Development, Environment and the Fight against Climate Change. August 2014. 903 pages. p. 75.
