= Petite rivière Smith =

- Location within Quebec

Location
- Country: Canada
- Province: Quebec
- Region: Capitale-Nationale
- RCM: La Côte-de-Beaupré Regional County Municipality
- Unorganized Territory: Lac-Jacques Cartier

Physical characteristics
- Source: Confluence of two forested streams
  - location: Lac-Jacques Cartier
  - coordinates: 47°09′59″N 71°01′24″W
  - elevation: 610 m
- Mouth: Smith River
  - location: Lac-Jacques Cartier
  - coordinates: 47°08′55″N 71°00′51″W
  - elevation: 547 m
- Length: 2.8 km (1.7 mi)

The Petite rivière Smith (English: Little Smith River) is a tributary of the northwest shore of the Smith River. This stream flows in the unorganized territory of Lac-Jacques-Cartier, in the La Côte-de-Beaupré Regional County Municipality, in the administrative region of Capitale-Nationale, in the province of Quebec, in Canada.

This small forest valley is served by a forest that goes from south to north by the east bank. Forestry is the main economic activity in this valley; second, recreational tourism.

Because of its altitude, the surface of "Petite rivière Smith" is generally frozen from late November to early April; however, safe circulation on the ice is generally done from mid-December to the end of March. The water level of the river varies with the seasons and the precipitation; the spring flood occurs in March or April.

== Geography ==
The "Petite rivière Smith" rises at the confluence of two forest streams (altitude: 610 metres (2,000 ft)) in the forest area. This source is located between two mountains in the unorganized territory of Lac-Jacques-Cartier, at:

- 1.1 kilometres (0.68 mi) north of a mountain peak (altitude: 814 metres (2,671 ft));
- 2.1 kilometres (1.3 mi) south of another mountain peak (altitude: 1,022 metres (3,353 ft));
- 4.4 kilometres (2.7 mi) north-east of the confluence of the Smith River and Montmorency River;
- 32.6 kilometres (20.3 mi) north of the mouth of the Montmorency River.

From it source, the Petite rivière Smith descends on 2.8 kilometres (1.7 mi) in the forest zone, with a drop of 63 metres (207 ft) according to the following segments:

- 1.5 kilometres (0.93 mi) south-west in a deep valley, crossing a small wild lake (length: 0.2 kilometres (0.12 mi); altitude: 569 metres (1,867 ft)), to its mouth;
- 1.3 kilometres (0.81 mi) first towards the southwest and curving towards the south, to its mouth.

From the confluence of "Petite rivière Smith", the current descends the Smith River on 5.5 kilometres (3.4 mi) southwest, then on 40.7 kilometres (25.3 mi) generally south along the course of the Montmorency river, to the northwest bank of the Saint-Laurent river.

== Toponymy ==
The toponym "Petite rivière Smith" is linked to its main stream, the "Smith River".

The toponym "Petite rivière Smith" was formalized on November 1, 1988 at the Commission de toponymie du Québec.

== Appendices ==
=== See also ===
- La Côte-de-Beaupré Regional County Municipality
- Lac-Jacques-Cartier, a TNO
- Smith River, a stream
- Montmorency River
- List of rivers of Quebec

=== Bibliography ===
- Charlevoix-Montmorency watershed organization (2015). Charlevoix-Montmorency water master plan (PDF). p. 75. Archived from the original (PDF) on 2016-11-25.
