= Rogue River =

Rogue River may refer to:

== Places in the United States ==
- Rogue River (Michigan), a river in Michigan
- Rogue River (Oregon), a river in Oregon
- Rogue River (South Yamhill River), a river in Oregon
- Rogue River, Oregon, a city in Oregon

== Other uses ==
- Rogue River (tribe), a Native American tribe in Southern Oregon
- "Rogue River" (Jericho episode), an episode of Jericho
- Rogue River (film), a 1951 film by John Rawlins
- Rogue River (train), a named passenger train in Oregon

== See also ==
- The Battle of Rogue River a 1954 Western film
- Rogue River Wars, a series of wars between the United States and the Rogue River tribe in Oregon
- Rouge River (disambiguation)
