= Noire River (Montmorency River tributary) =

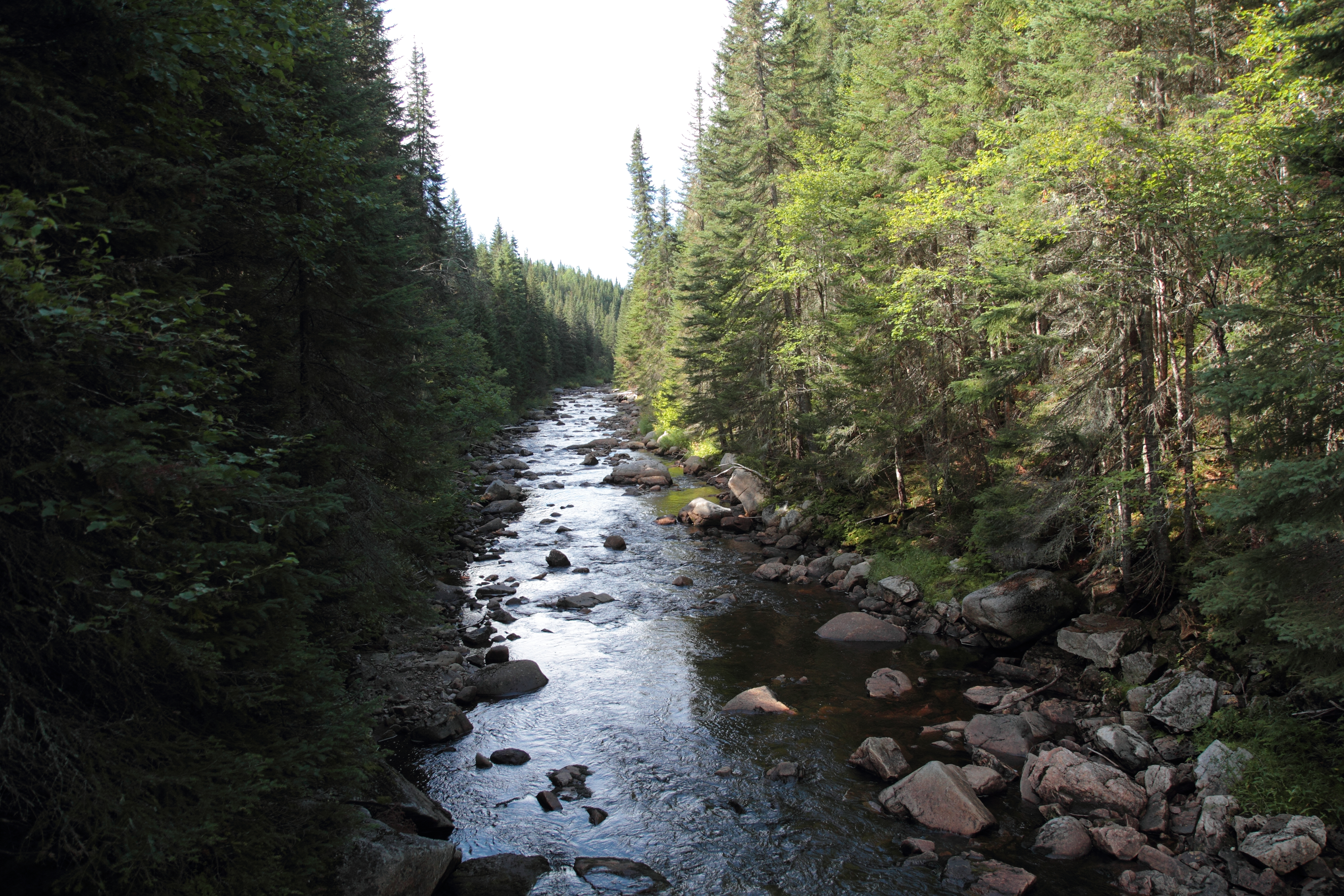

- Location within Quebec
- Native name: Rivière Noire (French)

Location
- Country: Canada
- Province: Quebec
- Region: Capitale-Nationale
- RCM: La Côte-de-Beaupré Regional County Municipality
- Unorganized territory: Lac-Jacques-Cartier

Physical characteristics
- Source: Asticot (located at the foot of Mont Jean-Hubert)
  - location: Lac-Jacques-Cartier Unorganized Territory, La Côte-de-Beaupré Regional County Municipality, Capitale-Nationale, Quebec, Canada
  - coordinates: 47°27′38″N 71°04′01″W
  - elevation: 580 m (1,900 ft)
- Mouth: Montmorency River
  - location: Lac-Jacques-Cartier Unorganized Territory
  - coordinates: 47°17′08″N 71°07′56″W
  - elevation: 580 m (1,900 ft)
- Length: 21.9 km (13.6 mi)
- Discharge
  - minimum: March
  - maximum: May

Basin features
- Tributaries
  - left: (upward from the mouth) unidentified stream constituting the outlet of lac Saunier, unidentified stream.
  - right: (upward from the mouth) unidentified stream, unidentified stream, unidentified stream (via Lake Bernier), unidentified stream, outlet of Lake Roza.

The Rivière Noire (English: Black River) is a tributary of the east bank of the Montmorency River. It flows in the unorganized territory of Lac-Jacques-Cartier, in the La Côte-de-Beaupré Regional County Municipality, in the administrative region of Capitale-Nationale, in the province of Quebec, in Canada.

This valley is mainly served by a forest road R0303 which comes from the south by passing on the west side of the mount Robert-Bellefeuille, then by crossing the Black river and going up towards the north by the East side of its course. Approaching the marsh area located west of the southern part of lac des Neiges, the road makes a detour to the east to bypass this latter lake from the south and continue north on the east bank.

Because of its altitude, the surface of the upper Black River is generally frozen from late November to early April; however, safe circulation on the ice is generally done from mid-December to the end of March. The lower part of the river course has a freezing period of about a week less than the upper part. The water level of the river varies with the seasons and the precipitation; the spring flood occurs in March or April.

== Geography ==
The Black River has its source in Lake Asticot (length: 0.4 kilometres (0.25 mi); altitude: 906 metres (2,972 ft)), in the Laurentides Wildlife Reserve, in the territory not organized by Lac-Jacques-Cartier. This lake between the mountains is located at the foot (western slope) of Mont Jean-Hubert whose summit (altitude: 1,061 metres (3,481 ft) is located at 1.1 kilometres (0.68 mi) at Its mouth is located 1.8 kilometres (1.1 mi) west of lac des Neiges, at 2.2 kilometres (1.4 mi) east of Lac Gamache which constitutes the head lake of the Malbaie River.

From the mouth of Lake Asticot, the Black River descends on 21.9 kilometres (13.6 mi), with a drop of 326 metres (1,070 ft) according to the following segments:

Upper Black River (segment of 9.5 kilometres (5.9 mi))

- 0.6 kilometres (0.37 mi) first towards the south crossing Lac des Rainettes (length: 0.5 kilometres (0.31 mi); altitude: 900 metres (3,000 ft)) until its mouth;
- 2.8 kilometres (1.7 mi) southwards crossing Lac des Loirs (length: 0.24 kilometres (0.15 mi); altitude: 904 metres (2,966 ft)), to the outlet (coming from the southwest) of Lake Roza;
- 3.9 kilometres (2.4 mi) towards the south-east by crossing a marsh zone until a bend of the river which forms a loop towards the east, then towards the south-west by starting in the marsh zone on 1.7 kilometres (1.1 mi) where the course forms a few small loops and a hook towards the west, up to a bend in the river;
- 2.2 kilometres (1.4 mi) towards the south in particular by crossing Lake Bernier (length: 10 kilometres (6.2 mi); altitude: 826 metres (2,710 ft)), up to its mouth;

Lower Black River (segment of 12.4 kilometres (7.7 mi))

- 3.1 kilometres (1.9 mi) to the south by collecting a stream (coming from the west), crossing a marsh area and crossing Lac Noir (length: 0.65 kilometres (0.40 mi); altitude: 794 metres (2,605 ft)), to its mouth;
- 3.7 kilometres (2.3 mi) towards the south-east by collecting the discharge (coming from the north-west) from Lake Belle Fontaine and by cutting the forest road R0308, going down in a well-steep valley, to a stream (coming from the north);
- 5.6 kilometres (3.5 mi) to the south in an increasingly deep valley, relatively in a straight line while forming a few small eighth notes, to its mouth.

The last 9.3 kilometres (5.8 mi) of the course of the Noire River cross the Montmorency Forest. From the confluence of the Black River, the current flows over 61.9 kilometres (38.5 mi) generally south along the course of the Montmorency River, to the northwest bank of the St. Lawrence River.

== Toponymy ==
The Black River toponym was formalized on June 1, 1972 at the Commission de toponymie du Québec.

== See also ==
- La Côte-de-Beaupré Regional County Municipality
- Laurentides Wildlife Reserve
- Montmorency River
- Montmorency Forest, a protected area
- List of rivers of Quebec

== Sources ==
- Charlevoix-Montmorency watershed organization (2015). Charlevoix-Montmorency water master plan (PDF). p. 75. Archived from the original (PDF) on 2016-11-25.
