= Rivière à l'Île =

River in Quebec, Canada

Old name: "Saint-Adolphe River" (main segment)
- Location within Quebec

Location
- Country: Canada
- Province: Quebec
- Region: Capitale-Nationale
- Regional County Municipality: La Jacques-Cartier Regional County Municipality
- Municipality: Château-Richer, Stoneham-et-Tewkesbury and Sainte-Brigitte-de-Laval

Physical characteristics
- Source: Lac de la Dame Deux
  - location: Château-Richer
  - coordinates: 47°08′39″N 71°09′56″W
  - elevation: 698 m
- Mouth: Montmorency River
  - location: Sainte-Brigitte-de-Laval
  - coordinates: 47°01′28″N 71°10′35″W
  - elevation: 238 m
- Length: 16.7 km (10.4 mi)

Basin features
- Tributaries
  - left: (Upward from the mouth) Discharge of small lakes which are in the heart of the village of Sainte-Brigitte-de-Laval, unidentified stream, outlet of Lake Thibeault, unidentified stream.
  - right: (Upward from the mouth) Unidentified stream, unidentified stream, discharge from two unidentified lakes, unidentified stream, West Arm of Rivière à l'Île (constituting the outlet of three lakes including Lac Garneau), Fiset stream.

The Rivière à l'Île (English: river to the island) is a tributary of the west bank of the Montmorency River, flowing in the administrative region of Capitale-Nationale, Quebec, Canada. This river successively flows through the regional county municipalities (MRC) of:

- La Côte-de-Beaupré Regional County Municipality: municipality of Château-Richer;
- La Jacques-Cartier Regional County Municipality: the municipality of the united cantons of Stoneham-et-Tewkesbury and the city of Sainte-Brigitte-de-Laval.

This valley is served mainly by rue Saint-Louis which goes up on the east side of this watercourse and by rue Labranche which goes up in part on the west side. Forestry is the main economic activity in this valley; recreational tourism, second.

Because of its altitude, the surface of the upper part of the Île river is generally frozen from the end of November to the beginning of April; however, safe circulation on the ice is generally done from mid-December to the end of March. The lower part of the river course has a freezing period of about a week less than the upper part. The water level of the river varies with the seasons and the precipitation; the spring flood occurs in March or April.

== Geography ==
The "rivère à l'Île" rises from a Dame Deux lake (length: 0.5 kilometres (0.31 mi) in the form of a fine; altitude: 698 metres (2,290 ft)) located in the north-central part of Château-Richer. This lake receives by its north shore a stream (coming from the northeast). During the 1920s, log drivers transported wood cut into logs on this lake in winter in order to divert it in the spring by the current from this river to the Montmorency river.

The mouth of the lake of Dame Deux is located at:

- 2.5 kilometres (1.6 mi) south-east of the "Tour-du-Nord" (altitude: 1,009 metres (3,310 ft)) which was used by the fire guards;
- 6.0 kilometres (3.7 mi) west of the course of the Montmorency River;
- 13.3 kilometres (8.3 mi) north-west of the mouth of the "rivière à l'Île" and the Montmorency River;
- 6.8 kilometres (4.2 mi) east of route 175, connecting to Quebec City to the city of Saguenay;
- 22.1 kilometres (13.7 mi) northwest of the northwest shore of the St. Lawrence River.

From the mouth of the head lake, the "rivière à l'Île" descends on 16.7 kilometres (10.4 mi), with a drop of 460 metres (1,510 ft) according to the following segments:

- 2.0 kilometres (1.2 mi) to the south in a deep valley crossing three series of rapids and passing between two mountains, to Fiset stream (coming from the northwest);
- 3.8 kilometres (2.4 mi) to the south in a deep valley between the mountains, crossing several series of rapids, up to the West Arm from the River to the Island (coming from the west);
- 0.7 kilometres (0.43 mi) south-east to the outlet of Lac Thibeault (coming from the north-east);
- 5.3 kilometres (3.3 mi) towards the south by forming on a segment the limit between Stoneham-et-Tewkesbury and Sainte-Brigitte-de-Laval, bending again towards the south- is to bypass an island having a length of 1.6 kilometres (0.99 mi), up to a road bridge on rue Pascal;
- 4.9 kilometres (3.0 mi) towards the south-east by crossing the village of Sainte-Brigitte-de-Laval.

The mouth of this river is located about 2.5 km northeast of the center of Sainte-Brigitte-de-Laval, a city located about twenty kilometers northeast of Quebec. From the confluence of the "rivière à l'Île" the current flows over 22.4 kilometres (13.9 mi) generally towards the south by the course of the Montmorency River, to the northwest bank du St. Lawrence River.

== Toponymy ==
The main course of this river was formerly designated "Saint-Adolphe River". While the upper segment was designated "Saint-Adolphe Nord-Est river" (ie the segment located between "Lac de la Dame Deux" and the "West Arm of the Rivière à l'Île").

The toponym "Rivière à l'Île" refers to the peninsula bounded on the west side by the Île river and on the East side by the Montmorency river. This point of the mouth of the Île river has a length of 0.54 kilometres (0.34 mi) in a north–south direction. Formerly, it was considered an island during the great floods. This point has a uniform part where the Laval-Nord residential sector has been developed.

The Île river includes another island with a length of 1.6 kilometres (0.99 mi) located downstream from the outlet of Lac Thibeault. The eastern channel, bypassing this island has two dams each forming a small reservoir.

Since December 13, 1996, the toponymic designation "Rivière à l'Île" has also applied to the bed of a stream to the east, which was officially called "Bras du Nord" from February 4, 1982.

The toponym "Rivière à l'Île" was formalized on December 13, 1996 at the Commission de toponymie du Québec.

== See also ==
- La Côte-de-Beaupré Regional County Municipality
- La Jacques-Cartier Regional County Municipality
- Château-Richer
- Stoneham-et-Tewkesbury
- Sainte-Brigitte-de-Laval
- Montmorency River
- List of rivers of Quebec
