= Smith River (Montmorency River tributary) =

- Location within Quebec
- Native name: Rivière de la Décharge (French)

Location
- Country: Canada
- Province: Quebec
- Region: Capitale-Nationale
- Regional County Municipality: La Jacques-Cartier Regional County Municipality

Physical characteristics
- Source: Saint-Hilaire Lake
  - location: Lac-Jacques-Cartier (unorganized territory)
  - coordinates: 47°09′06″N 70°58′10″W
  - elevation: 657 m
- Mouth: Montmorency River
  - location: Lac-Jacques-Cartier
  - coordinates: 47°08′35″N 71°04′10″W
  - elevation: 374 m
- Length: 12.6 km (7.8 mi)

Basin features
- Tributaries
  - left: (Upward from the mouth) Unidentified stream, unidentified stream, Little Smith River.
  - right: (Upward from the mouth) Discharge from an unidentified lake, unidentified stream, Smith stream (Bonnet lake outlet), Gagnon stream.

The Smith River is a tributary of the east bank of the Montmorency River. It flows in the unorganized territory of Lac-Jacques-Cartier, in the La Côte-de-Beaupré Regional County Municipality, in the administrative region of Capitale-Nationale, in the province of Quebec, in Canada.

The upper part of this valley is served by the Sept Crans road which goes up from the south and bypasses the Mont du Lac Saint-Hilaire; a forest road serves the south bank of the lower part. Forestry is the main economic activity in this valley; second, recreational tourism.

Because of its altitude, the surface of the upper Smith River is generally frozen from late November to early April; however, safe circulation on the ice is generally done from mid-December to the end of March. The lower part of the river course has a freezing period of about a week less than the upper part. The water level of the river varies with the seasons and the precipitation; the spring flood occurs in March or April.

== Geography ==
The Smith River originates in Lake Saint-Hilaire (length: 5.4 kilometres (3.4 mi); altitude: 657 metres (2,156 ft)). This lake is located between Mont du Lac Saint-Hilaire (altitude: 880 metres (2,890 ft)) and Mont du Lac à Foin (altitude: 910 metres (2,990 ft)). The mouth of this lake is located in the unorganized territory of Lac-Jacques-Cartier, at:

- 1.25 kilometres (0.78 mi) north of the summit of Mont du Lac Saint-Hilaire;
- 7.7 kilometres (4.8 mi) north-east of the mouth of the Smith River and the Montmorency River;
- 14.1 kilometres (8.8 mi) north-west of the north-west bank of the Saint Lawrence River;
- 16.1 kilometres (10.0 mi) south-east of the limit of the Laurentides Wildlife Reserve;
- 32.4 kilometres (20.1 mi) north of the mouth of the Montmorency River.

From the mouth of Saint-Hilaire Lake, the Smith River descends on 12.6 kilometres (7.8 mi), with a drop of 283 metres (928 ft) according to the following segments:

- 1.6 kilometres (0.99 mi) north-west along the foot of Mont du lac Saint-Hilaire, to a bend corresponding to the outlet of Gagnon stream (coming from the north-east);
- 1.8 kilometres (1.1 mi) westward by forming small serpentines, up to Smith Creek (coming from the north) which constitutes the outlet of Lac Bonnet;
- 3.7 kilometres (2.3 mi) to the south, collecting an unidentified stream (coming from the northwest) to the confluence of the Petite rivière Smith (coming from the east);
- 5.5 kilometres (3.4 mi) first towards the south-west and curving towards the west in a deep valley, to its mouth.

From the confluence of the Smith River, the current flows over 40.7 kilometres (25.3 mi) generally south along the course of the Montmorency River, to the northwest bank of the St. Lawrence River.

== Toponymy ==
This river was formerly designated "Rivière de la Décharge". The term "Smith" constitutes a family name of Anglo-Saxon origin. The place names "rivièr Smith" and "Petite rivière Smith" are linked.

The toponym "rivière Smith" was formalized on December 13, 1996, at the Commission de toponymie du Québec.

== See also ==
- La Côte-de-Beaupré Regional County Municipality
- Lac-Jacques-Cartier, an unorganized territory
- Petite rivière Smith, a tributary
- Montmorency River
- List of rivers of Quebec

== Sources ==
- Charlevoix-Montmorency watershed organization (2015). Charlevoix-Montmorency water master plan (PDF). p. 75.
