= Rouge River East =

- Location within Quebec

Location
- Country: Canada
- Province: Quebec
- Region: Capitale-Nationale
- Regional County Municipality: La Jacques-Cartier Regional County Municipality
- Municipality: Château-Richer

Physical characteristics
- Source: Grand Lake
  - location: Château-Richer
  - coordinates: 47°04′51″N 71°04′56″W
  - elevation: 565 m
- Mouth: Rouge River (Montmorency River)
  - location: Château-Richer
  - coordinates: 46°59′07″N 71°06′22″W
  - elevation: 372 m
- Length: 3.7 km (2.3 mi)

Basin features
- Tributaries
  - right: Unidentified stream

The Rivière Rouge East is a tributary of the east bank of the Rouge River. This stream flows in the municipality of Château-Richer, in the La Jacques-Cartier Regional County Municipality, in the administrative region of Capitale-Nationale, in the province from Quebec, to Canada.

The upper part of this forest valley surrounded by mountains is served by a forest road from the south. While the Saint-Achillée road passes on the north side of the lower part. Forestry is the main economic activity in this valley; second, recreational tourism.

Because of its altitude, the surface of the upper part of the Rouge East River is generally frozen from the end of November to the beginning of April; however, safe circulation on the ice is generally done from mid-December to the end of March. The water level of the river varies with the seasons and the precipitation; the spring flood occurs in March or April.

== Geography ==
The Rouge East River takes its source from Lac Grand (length: 3.0 kilometres (1.9 mi); altitude: 565 metres (1,854 ft)) landlocked between the mountains. The mouth of this lake is located in the municipality of Château-Richer, at:

- 1.24 kilometres (0.77 mi) west of a mountain peak reaching 748 metres (2,454 ft);
- 2.8 kilometres (1.7 mi) north-west of a mountain peak reaching 664 metres (2,178 ft);
- 12.4 kilometres (7.7 mi) north-west of the north-west bank of the St. Lawrence River;
- 2.6 kilometres (1.6 mi) south-east of the confluence of the Rouge East River and the Rouge River (Montmorency River).

From the mouth of this head lake, the Rouge East River descends on 3.7 kilometres (2.3 mi), with a drop of 193 metres (633 ft) according to the following segments:

- 0.4 kilometres (0.25 mi) to the south, then to the east, partly crossing Lac du Bord (length: 0.36 kilometres (0.22 mi); altitude: 564 metres (1,850 ft)), to its mouth;
- 1.8 kilometres (1.1 mi) to the north with a drop of 114 metres (374 ft), up to a bend in the river, corresponding to the discharge of a stream (coming from the east);
- 1.5 kilometres (0.93 mi) west in the forest zone with a drop of 78 metres (256 ft), to its mouth.

The Rouge River East flows on the East bank of the Rouge river. From this confluence of the Rouge River East, the current descends on 0.6 kilometres (0.37 mi) towards the northwest by following the course of the Rouge River, then descends on 34.7 kilometres (21.6 mi) generally towards the south by the course of the Montmorency River, up to the northwest bank of the Saint Lawrence River.

== Toponymy ==
The toponyms "Rivière Rouge" and "Rivière Rouge Est" are linked.

The toponym "Rivière Rouge Est" was officialized on December 13, 1996 at the Commission de toponymie du Québec.

== Appendices ==
=== See also ===
- La Côte-de-Beaupré Regional County Municipality
- Château-Richer, a municipality
- Rouge River
- Montmorency River
- List of rivers of Quebec

=== Bibliography ===
- Charlevoix-Montmorency (2015). Charlevoix-Montmorency water master plan (PDF). p. 75. Archived from the original (PDF) on 2016-11-25.
