= Rouge River (Montmorency River tributary) =

- Location within Quebec

Location
- Country: Canada
- Province: Quebec
- Region: Capitale-Nationale
- Regional County Municipality: La Jacques-Cartier Regional County Municipality
- Municipality: Château-Richer

Physical characteristics
- Source: Little unidentified lake
  - location: Château-Richer
  - coordinates: 47°02′26″N 71°06′23″W
  - elevation: 598 m
- Mouth: Montmorency River
  - location: Château-Richer
  - coordinates: 47°05′59″N 71°06′35″W
  - elevation: 372 m
- Length: 8.7 km (5.4 mi)

Basin features
- Tributaries
  - right: Unidentified stream

The Rivière Rouge is a tributary of the east bank of the Montmorency River, flowing in the administrative region of Capitale-Nationale, in the province of Quebec, in Canada. This watercourse successively crosses the regional county municipalities (MRC) of:

- La Jacques-Cartier Regional County Municipality: municipality of Sainte-Brigitte-de-Laval;
- La Côte-de-Beaupré Regional County Municipality: municipality of Château-Richer.

This forest and mountain valley is served by a forest road passing on the east side of the river. Forestry is the main economic activity in this valley; second, recreational tourism.

Because of its altitude, the surface of the upper Red River is generally frozen from late November to early April; however, safe circulation on the ice is generally done from mid-December to the end of March. The water level of the river varies with the seasons and the precipitation; the spring flood occurs in March or April.

== Geography ==
The Rouge River takes its source from a small lake (length: 0.24 kilometres (0.15 mi); altitude: 598 metres (1,962 ft)) landlocked between the mountains. The mouth of this lake is located in the municipality of Château-Richer, at:

- 0.68 kilometres (0.42 mi) north of a mountain peak reaching 672 metres (2,205 ft);
- 1.24 kilometres (0.77 mi) south of a mountain peak reaching 686 metres (2,251 ft);
- 3.5 kilometres (2.2 mi) east of a curve of the Montmorency River;
- 10.3 kilometres (6.4 mi) north-west of the north-west bank of the St. Lawrence River;
- 6.6 kilometres (4.1 mi) south-east of the confluence of the Rouge and Montmorency rivers.

From the mouth of this head lake, the Red River descends on 8.7 kilometres (5.4 mi), with a drop of 230 metres (750 ft) according to the following segments:

- 0.8 kilometres (0.50 mi) to the west, collecting a stream (coming from the south) corresponding to a bend in the river, then towards the north to another stream (coming from the southwest);
- 2.3 kilometres (1.4 mi) north between two mountains, collecting a stream (coming from the east) and crossing a small lake (altitude: 486 metres (1,594 ft)) until its mouth, corresponding to the discharge of a small stream (coming from the north);
- 1.7 kilometres (1.1 mi) first towards the west by collecting a stream (coming from the north), then by forming a small loop towards the south to collect a stream (coming from the south) and towards the north by collecting another stream (coming from the west), up to the outlet (coming from the east) of Château lakes and at La Source;
- 3.3 kilometres (2.1 mi) towards the north in a deep valley by entering Château-Richer, then bending towards the north-west after having skirted a mountain (located on the west side), until the Rouge River East (coming from the east) which constitutes the outlet of Lac Grand;
- 0.6 kilometres (0.37 mi) towards the northwest first by collecting the discharge (coming from the north) from an unidentified lake, then by forming a curve towards the south to collect a mountain stream (coming from the south), to its mouth.

The Rouge River flows into a bend on the east bank of the Montmorency River. From this confluence of the Rouge River, the current flows over 34.7 kilometres (21.6 mi) generally south by the course of the Montmorency River, to the northwest shore of the St. Lawrence River.

== Toponymy ==
The toponym "Rivière Rouge" was formalized on December 13, 1996 at the Commission de toponymie du Québec.

== Appendices ==
=== Related articles ===
- La Côte-de-Beaupré Regional County Municipality
- La Jacques-Cartier Regional County Municipality
- Sainte-Brigitte-de-Laval, a municipality
- Château-Richer, a municipality
- Rouge River East
- Montmorency River
- List of rivers of Quebec

=== Bibliography ===
- Charlevoix-Montmorency watershed organization (2015). Charlevoix-Montmorency water master plan (PDF). p. 75. Archived from the original (PDF) on 2016-11-25.
