= Rivière du Lac =

- Location within Quebec

Location
- Country: Canada
- Province: Quebec
- Region: Capitale-Nationale
- City: Quebec (city)

Physical characteristics
- Source: Confluence of two streams
  - location: Quebec (city)
  - coordinates: 46°55′52″N 71°14′10″W
  - elevation: 270 m
- Mouth: Montmorency River
  - location: Quebec (city)
  - coordinates: 46°56′04″N 71°11′40″W
  - elevation: 165 m
- Length: 4.1 km (2.5 mi)

Basin features
- Tributaries
  - left: (Upward from the mouth) Discharge from an unidentified lake, unidentified stream.
  - right: Sainte-Marie stream (outlet of "Lac à Monette")

The rivière du Lac (English: River of the lake) is a tributary of the west bank of the Montmorency River. This watercourse flows on the north shore of the St. Lawrence River, in the city of Quebec, in the administrative region of Capitale-Nationale, in the province of Quebec, in Canada.

This valley is mainly served by the Lac-des-Roches road which passes on the north bank of this watercourse. Forestry is the main economic activity in this valley; second resort; agriculture (in the lower part around the village of Côte-du-Lac), third.

The surface of the Lac river is generally frozen from the beginning of December until the end of March; however, safe circulation on the ice is generally done from mid-December to mid-March. The water level of the river varies with the seasons and the precipitation; the spring flood occurs in March or April.

== Geography ==
The "rivière du Lac" rises at the confluence of two forest streams (altitude: 270 metres (890 ft)), ie:

- 2.25 kilometres (1.40 mi) south of the summit of Mont Saint-Louis;
- 3.2 kilometres (2.0 mi) south-west of the confluence of the Lac river and the Montmorency River;
- 3.3 kilometres (2.1 mi) north-east of the summit of Mont des Épinettes Noires;
- 3.6 kilometres (2.2 mi) east of Beauport Lake;
- 8.7 kilometres (5.4 mi) west of the northwest shore of the St. Lawrence River.

Course of the Lac river

From its source, the Rivière du Lac descends in a valley between the mountains, first in forest territory, on 4.1 kilometres (2.5 mi), with a drop of 105 metres (344 ft), according to the following segments:

- 1.5 kilometres (0.93 mi) towards the east crossing the Lac du Chemin de l'Aqueduc (length: 0.2 kilometres (0.12 mi); altitude: 249 metres (817 ft)), to the dam at its mouth;
- 1.1 kilometres (0.68 mi) to the east crossing a small unidentified lake (length: 0.1 kilometres (0.062 mi); altitude: 208 metres (682 ft)) which receives from the side south Sainte-Marie brook, to its mouth;
- 1.5 kilometres (0.93 mi) towards the east by forming a curve towards the north to go through the village of Côte-du-Lac, to its mouth.

From the confluence of the Lac river, the current flows over 10.2 kilometres (6.3 mi) generally towards the south by the course of the Montmorency River, up to the northwest bank of the St. Lawrence River.

== Toponymy ==
The toponym "rivière du Lac" derives from the fact that this watercourse crosses the "Lac du Chemin de l'Aqueduc". A dam has been built at the mouth of this lake.

The toponym "Rivière du Lac" was formalized on December 5, 1968 at the Place Names Bank of the Commission de toponymie du Québec.

== See also ==
- Quebec (city), a city
- Capitale-Nationale, an administrative region
- Montmorency River
- St. Lawrence River
- List of rivers of Quebec
