= Rivière des Neiges =

- Location within Quebec

Location
- Country: Canada
- Province: Quebec
- Region: Capitale-Nationale
- RCM: La Côte-de-Beaupré Regional County Municipality
- Unorganized territory: Lac-Jacques-Cartier

Physical characteristics
- Source: Lac des Neiges
  - location: Lac-Jacques-Cartier Unorganized Territory
  - coordinates: 47°29′27″N 71°01′25″W
  - elevation: 842 m (2,762 ft)
- Mouth: Montmorency River
  - location: Lac-Jacques-Cartier Unorganized Territory
  - coordinates: 46°10′40″N 71°05′53″W
  - elevation: 390 m (1,280 ft)
- Length: 36.6 km (22.7 mi)
- Basin size: 372.8 km^{2} (143.9 sq mi)
- Discharge
  - minimum: March
  - maximum: May

Basin features
- Tributaries
  - left: (upward from the mouth) rivière du Camp Brûlé, unidentified stream, unidentified stream, unidentified stream, Savane River (rivière des Neiges), outlet of Lily Lake, unidentified stream, unidentified stream (via English Lake).
  - right: (upward from the mouth) Eight unidentified streams.

The Rivière des Neiges is a tributary of the east bank of the Montmorency River. It flows in the unorganized territory of Lac-Jacques-Cartier, in La Côte-de-Beaupré Regional County Municipality, in the administrative region of Capitale-Nationale, in province from Quebec, to Canada.

This river has a low water level; thus, kayaking is only possible during the spring flood.

This valley is mainly served by a secondary forest road up the east bank of the Rivière des Neiges. From the mouth of the Savane River, this road extends northeastward, mainly following the east bank of the latter. While the hydrographic slope of lac des Neiges is mainly served by the forest road R0308 coming from the South and passing on the East side of the lake. A secondary forest road runs along the east shore of this lake to serve a dozen chalets in the mouth of the lake and the area north of the upper part of the Rivière des Neiges.

Because of its altitude, the surface of the upper part of the Rivière des Neiges is generally frozen from the end of November until the beginning of April; however, safe circulation on the ice is generally done from mid-December to the end of March. The lower part of the river course has a freezing period of about two weeks less than the upper part. The water level of Lac des Neiges is controlled by a dam built at its mouth. The water level of the river varies with the seasons and the precipitation; the spring flood occurs in March or April.

== Geography ==
The Rivière des Neiges is the most important tributary of the Montmorency River. It rises in Lac des Neiges, in the Laurentides Wildlife Reserve. It then flows south over a distance of 36.6 kilometres (22.7 mi) to reach the Montmorency river past the southern limit of the wildlife reserve.

The bed of the Rivière des Neiges turns out to be very rocky. The course of this river descends to the bottom of a glacial valley. This valley gradually becomes more steep, offering splendid panoramas on the way to the point of confluence with the Montmorency river.

From the dam at the mouth of lac des Neiges, the Rivière des Neiges descends on 41.4 kilometres (25.7 mi), with a drop of 452 metres (1,483 ft) according to the following segments:

Upper part of the rivière des Neiges (segment of 21.6 kilometres (13.4 mi))

- 2.9 kilometres (1.8 mi) first towards the east, then towards the south-east crossing English Lake (length: 2.5 kilometres (1.6 mi); altitude: 838 metres (2,749 ft)) to its mouth;
- 1.3 kilometres (0.81 mi) towards the south-east by passing near the southern zone of the old forest of Lac-des-Neiges located on the west bank, then the course of the river forms a small hook towards the northeast, to the outlet (coming from the south) of lakes Renaud and Dumont;
- 7.7 kilometres (4.8 mi) towards the south-east relatively in a straight line in a valley becoming more and more steep, by collecting the discharge (coming from the north-east) of Lac Lily, up to a bend river;
- 9.7 kilometres (6.0 mi) towards the south in a well boxed valley by collecting in particular the discharge of lakes Malin, Génois, Morency and Petit lac Génois, until the Savane River (from the East);

Lower part of the rivière des Neiges (segment of 19.8 kilometres (12.3 mi))

- 6.4 kilometres (4.0 mi) to the south by collecting the outlet of Lac Indigo (coming from the west) to the outlet (coming from the northwest) of Lac Beaudry;
- 8.5 kilometres (5.3 mi) to the south in a well-enclosed valley, in particular by crossing the Lac des Petites Îles, to the confluence of the rivière du Camp Brûlé (coming from the East);
- 4.9 kilometres (3.0 mi) to the south in a well-boxed valley, forming a hook to the southwest, to its mouth.

From the confluence of the Rivière des Neiges, the current flows over 46.3 kilometres (28.8 mi) generally towards the south by the course of the Montmorency River, to the northwest bank of the St. Lawrence River.

== Toponymy ==
The toponym Rivière des Neiges is linked to Lac des Neiges. The origin of these toponymic designations is associated with the presence of snow on the surrounding peaks for a greater part of the year than in the lower valleys. The designation "Snow River" appears on the map of provincial surveyor Frederic William Blaiklock of 1852.

The Wendats name this river Kahndaoochaooyi Lahandawa.

The toponym Rivière des Neiges was formalized on December 5, 1968 at the Commission de toponymie du Québec.

== See also ==
- La Côte-de-Beaupré Regional County Municipality
- Montmorency River
- Rivière du Camp Brûlé
- Savane River
- Lac des Neiges
- Lac-des-Neiges Old Forest, a protected area
- List of rivers of Quebec

== Sources ==
- Charlevoix-Montmorency watershed organization (2015). Charlevoix-Montmorency water master plan (PDF). p. 75. Archived from the original (PDF) on 2016-11-25.
