= Sainte-Brigitte-de-Laval =

- City
- Aerial view of Sainte-Brigitte-de-Laval

- Coat of arms
- Motto: Dieu ayde
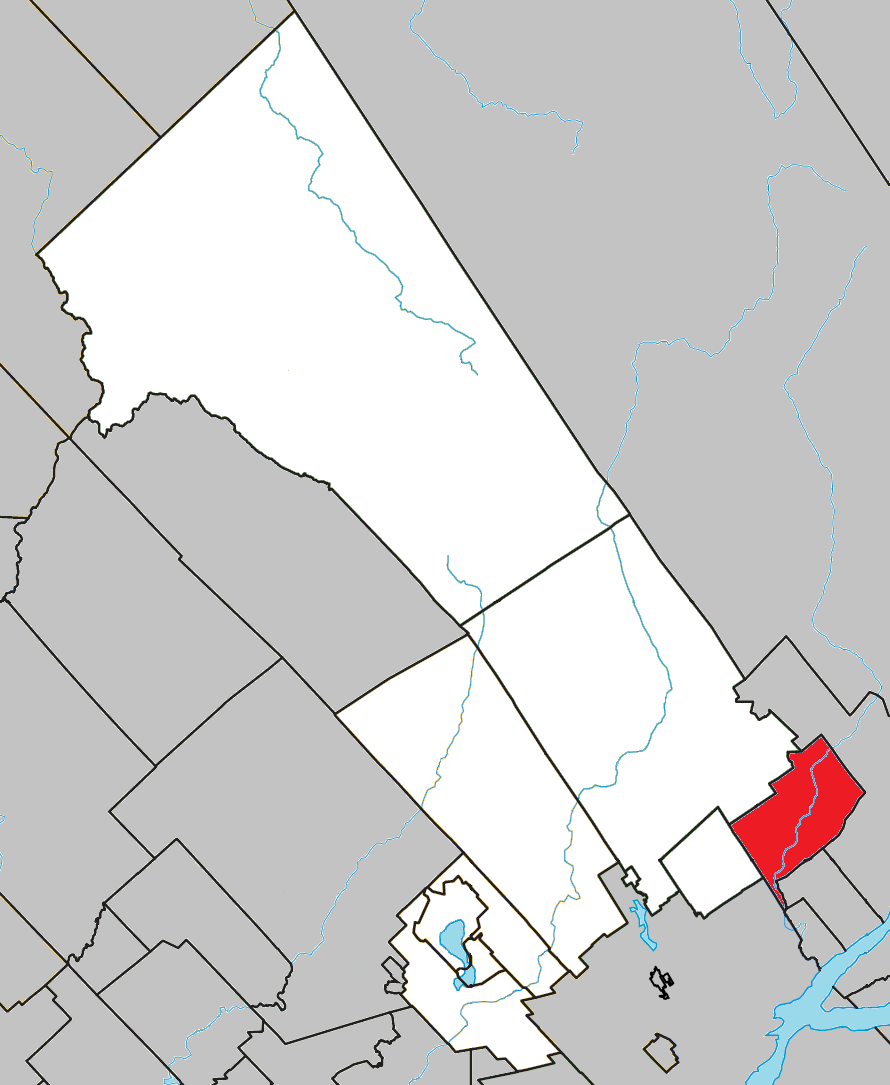
- Location within La Jacques-Cartier RCM

- Location in central Quebec
- Coordinates: 47°00′N 71°12′W
- Country: Canada
- Province: Quebec
- Region: Capitale-Nationale
- RCM: La Jacques-Cartier
- Settled: c. 1830
- Constituted: February 11, 1875

Government
  - Mayor: Mathieu Thomassin
  - Fed. riding: Montmorency—Charlevoix
  - Prov. riding: Montmorency

Area
  - Total: 108.94 km^{2} (42.06 sq mi)
  - Land: 108.42 km^{2} (41.86 sq mi)

Population (2021)
  - Total: 8,468
  - Density: 78.1/km^{2} (202/sq mi)
  - Pop (2016-21): ▲15.2%
  - Dwellings: 3,343
- Time zone: UTC−5 (EST)
  - Summer (DST): UTC−4 (EDT)
- Postal code(s): G0A 3K0
- Area codes: 418, 581
- Highways: No major routes
- Website: sbdl.net

Sainte-Brigitte-de-Laval (French pronunciation: [sɛ̃t bʁiʒit də laval]) is a city in La Jacques-Cartier Regional County Municipality in the Capitale-Nationale region of Quebec, Canada. Its urban area is located in the hollow of the Montmorency River valley, northeast of Quebec City.

The city is named in honor of Brigid of Kildare in memory of the Irish origin of the first settlers. The name Laval comes from the situation of Sainte-Brigitte in the seigneury of Beaupré, whose first owner was François de Laval, bishop of Quebec.

== History ==
Settlement began in the area in the 1830s, by Irish people who had fled their country because of food shortage. In 1837, a mission was established. In 1850, French Canadians began to settle there, and in 1855, its post office opened. In 1863, the Parish of Sainte-Brigitte-de-Laval was formed. On February 11, 1875, the Parish Municipality of Sainte-Brigitte-de-Laval was created out of territory ceded from the Parish Municipalities of Ange Gardien and Chateau Richer.

On September 10, 1988, the parish municipality changed its statutes to become a regular municipality, and again on December 8, 2012, to become a city.

== Demographics ==
In the 2021 Census of Population conducted by Statistics Canada, Sainte-Brigitte-de-Laval had a population of 8,468 living in 3,203 of its 3,343 total private dwellings, a change of 15.2% from its 2016 population of 7,348. With a land area of 108.42 km^{2} (41.86 sq mi), it had a population density of 78.1/km^{2} (202.3/sq mi) in 2021.

Historical Census Data - Sainte-Brigitte-de-Laval, Quebec

Year	Pop.	±%
1871	763	—
1881	690	−9.6%
1891	639	−7.4%
1901	657	+2.8%
1911	655	−0.3%
1921	556	−15.1%
1931	595	+7.0%
1941	962	+61.7%

Year	Pop.	±%
1951	1,154	+20.0%
1956	1,542	+33.6%
1961	1,734	+12.5%
1966	1,497	−13.7%
1971	1,657	+10.7%
1976	1,829	+10.4%
1981	2,219	+21.3%
1986	2,388	+7.6%

Year	Pop.	±%
1991	2,833	+18.6%
1996	3,214	+13.4%
2001	3,383	+5.3%
2006	3,790	+12.0%
2011	5,696	+50.3%
2016	7,348	+29.0%
2021	8,468	+15.2%

Population counts are not adjusted for boundary changes.
Source: Statistics Canada

Mother tongue (2021):

- French as first language: 97.1%
- English as first language: 0.8%
- English and French as first languages: 0.8%
- Other as first language: 1.0%

== Government ==
Due to the 2022 Canadian federal electoral redistribution, Sainte-Brigitte-de-Laval was redistricted to the nearby riding of Montmorency—Charlevoix, which is represented by Gabriel Hardy of the Conservative Party since 2025.

Before that, Sainte-Brigitte-de-Laval formed part of the federal electoral district of Portneuf—Jacques-Cartier and was represented by Joël Godin of the Conservative Party between 2015 and 2025. Provincially, Sainte-Brigitte-de-Laval is part of the Montmorency electoral district and is represented by Jean-François Simard of the Coalition Avenir Québec since 2018.

Sainte-Brigitte-de-Laval federal election results
Year	Liberal		Conservative		Bloc Québécois		New Democratic		Green	
2021	14%	563	49%	1,924	22%	851	7%	260	0%	0
2019	18%	670	41%	1,526	26%	993	7%	279	4%	152

Sainte-Brigitte-de-Laval provincial election results
Year	CAQ		Liberal		QC solidaire		Parti Québécois	
2018	55%	2,088	13%	479	13%	506	10%	374
2014	41%	1,506	35%	1,287	5%	193	13%	473

=== Administration ===
2026 administration:

- Mayor: Mathieu Thomassin
- District #1: Jean-Philippe Lemieux
- District #2: Sylvie Lajoie
- District #3: Diane Thibault
- District #4: Marcel Jean
- District #5: Carl Thomassin
- District #6: Christian Paquet

== See also ==
- List of municipalities in Quebec
