= Montmorency River =

Montmorency River Rivière Montmorency
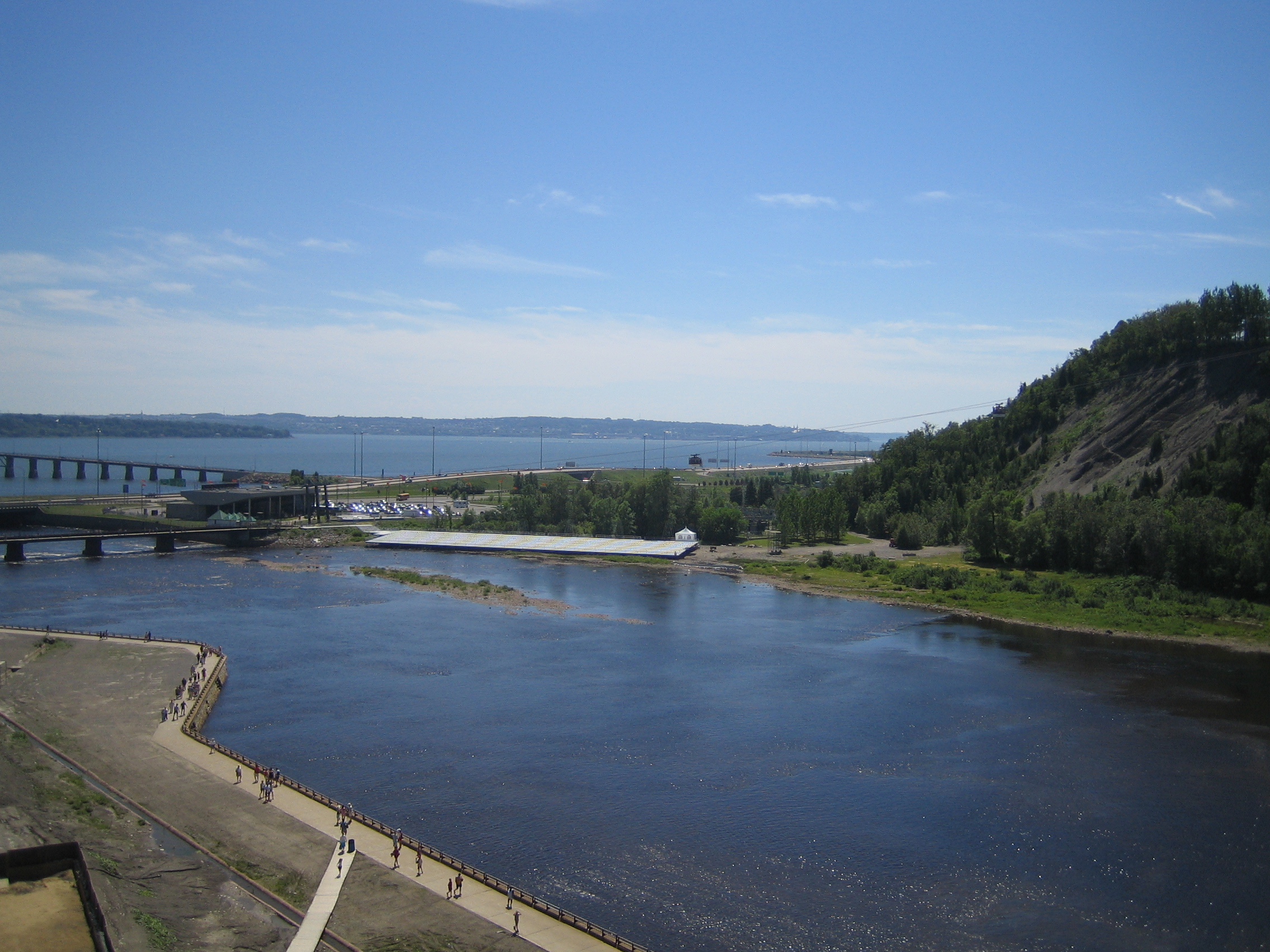
- Mouth of the Montmorency River

Location
- Country: Canada
- Province: Quebec
- Region: Capitale-Nationale
- RCM: La Jacques-Cartier Regional County Municipality, La Côte-de-Beaupré Regional County Municipality and Quebec (city)

Physical characteristics
- Source: Moran Lake
  - location: Lac-Jacques-Cartier Unorg. Terr.
  - coordinates: 47°34′42″N 71°04′45″W
  - elevation: 845 m (2,772 ft)
- Mouth: Saint Lawrence River
  - location: Boischatel
  - coordinates: 46°53′06″N 71°08′36″W
  - elevation: 4 m (13 ft)
- Length: 103.7 km (64.4 mi)
- Basin size: 1,150 km^{2} (440 sq mi)
- Discharge
  - average: 35.6 m^{3}/s (1,260 cu ft/s)
  - minimum: 2.2 m^{3}/s (78 cu ft/s)March
  - maximum: 580 m^{3}/s (20,000 cu ft/s)May

Basin features
- Tributaries
  - left: (upward from the mouth) Le Grand Ruisseau, Ferrée River, discharge from an unidentified lake, Verret stream, Brebel stream, Castor stream, Rouge River, Jos-Bédard stream, Smith River, discharge from 4 unidentified lakes, Turcotte stream, Cauchon stream, unidentified stream, rivière des Neiges, discharge from two unidentified lakes, unidentified stream, unidentified stream, Blanche River, Noire River, Laflamme lake outlet, unidentified stream, unidentified stream, discharge from Lake Élois, discharge from Lake Provençal (via Mare du Sault), Creek from Murphy, discharge from Lake Absolon, discharge from Lac Lachance, unidentified stream, unidentified stream, discharge from Lake Alyse.
  - right: (upward from the mouth) Unidentified stream (via Lac du Délaissé), rivière du Lac, unidentified stream, unidentified stream, Lac Lamarre outlet, Euclide stream, unidentified stream, rivière aux Pins, Richelieu River, rivière à l'Île, Déboulis stream, Swain stream, unidentified stream, discharge from a non-dentified lake, stream Boutet, North stream, unidentified stream, Aulnaies stream, outlet of Piché lake, outlet of Pasquin lake, outlet of Forestier lake, Brûlés stream, unidentified stream, unidentified stream, outlet of a small unidentified lake, unidentified stream, discharge from a group of lakes including Maltais, Montmorency and Ancolies, unidentified stream.

The Montmorency River (French pronunciation: [mɔ̃mɔʁɑ̃si]) is a tributary of North-East bank of St. Lawrence River, flowing in the administrative region of Capitale-Nationale, in the province of Quebec, Canada. The course of the river successively crosses the regional county municipality of:

- MRC La Côte-de-Beaupré Regional County Municipality: Lac-Jacques-Cartier, Château-Richer, L'Ange-Gardien, Boischatel;
- MRC La Jacques-Cartier Regional County Municipality: Sainte-Brigitte-de-Laval
- Agglomération de Québec.

It drains into the Saint Lawrence River, about 9 kilometres (5.6 mi) downstream from Quebec City. It is especially known for the impressive Montmorency Falls near its mouth.

It has an average flow of 35.6 m^{3}/s (1,260 cu ft/s). Typical average summer flow is about 25 m^{3}/s (880 cu ft/s), whereas during spring run-off, the river could swell anywhere from 130 to 650 m^{3}/s (4,600 to 23,000 cu ft/s). Above 770 m^{3}/s (27,000 cu ft/s) is considered an exceptional flood condition, and the Montmorency experienced a record flow of 1,100 m^{3}/s (39,000 cu ft/s) in November 1966.

== Geography ==
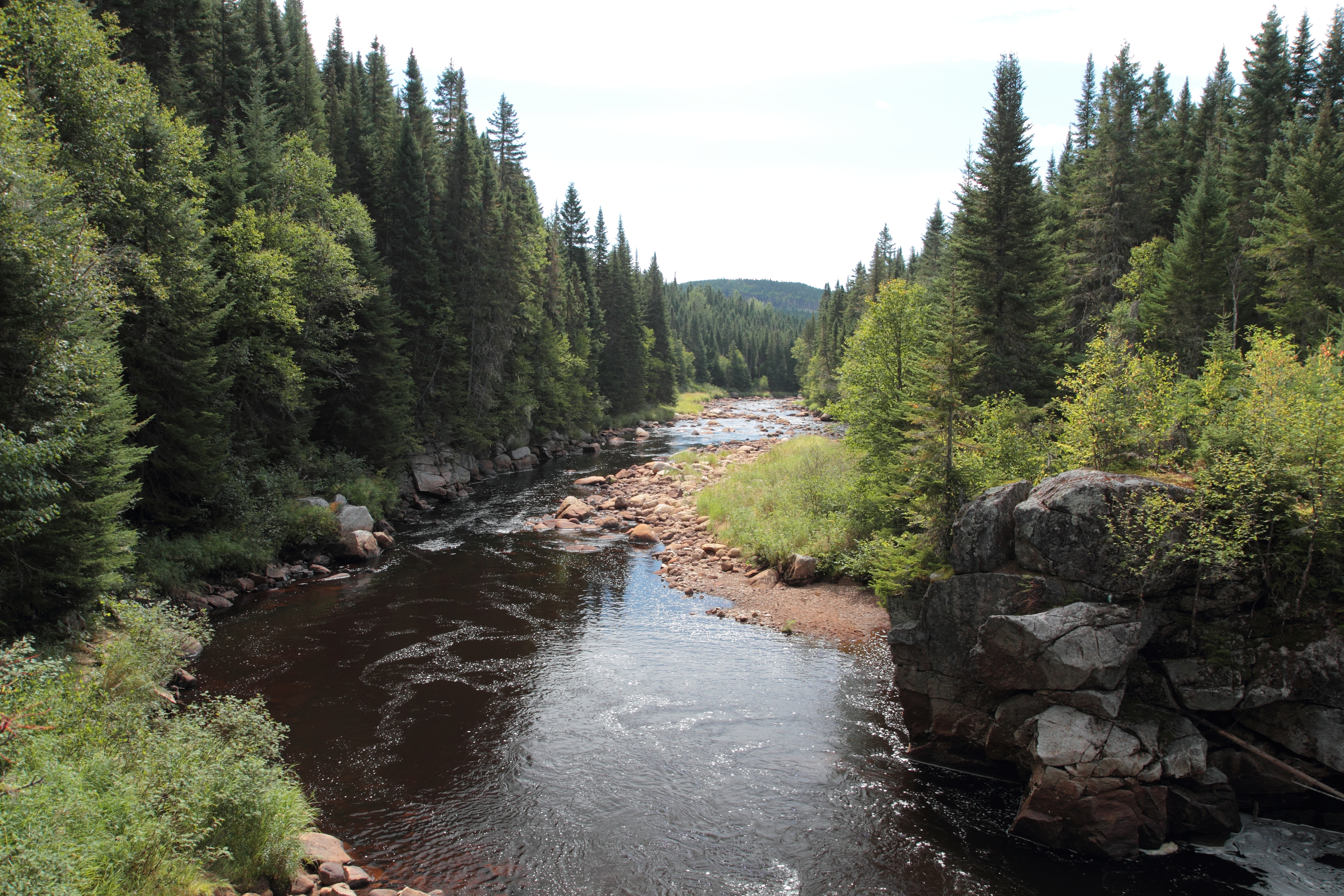

The Montmorency River flows from Lake Montmorency in a southerly direction through the undeveloped Canadian Shield of the Laurentides Wildlife Reserve. Reaching the northern part of the municipality of Château-Richer, it flows between high rocky cliffs that in some places are more than 600 metres (1,969 ft) high. Thereafter, it passes through the municipalities of Sainte-Brigitte-de-Laval, Beauport, and Boischatel, where the course of the river is characterized by the presence of numerous rapids before plunging 83 metres (272 ft) over the Montmorency Falls.

The river's watershed basin is sparsely populated, 92% of it is forested and dotted with 424 lakes. The largest lake, with an area of 7.53 square kilometres (2.91 sq mi), is Lac des Neiges (English: Lake of Snow) which is the source of rivière des Neiges (English: River of Snow), Montmorency's largest tributary. Urban and agricultural land makes up only 2% and 1% of the basin respectively, and is mostly confined to a small section in the far south of the Saint Lawrence lowlands.

The municipalities and unorganized territories that cover the Montmorency basin are:

Municipality	Area within basin (km^{2})	Proportion of basin (%)	Population within basin	Proportion of basin (%)
Boischatel	16.96	1.47	3508	12.47
Château-Richer	108.33	9.42	1541	5.06
L'Ange-Gardien	28.31	2.46	1574	5.17
Lac-Beauport	6.43	0.56	583	1.91
Lac-Jacques-Cartier	822.09	71.50	0	0
Lac-Pikauba	2.46	0.21	0	0
Quebec City	22.16	1.93	19,213	63.07
Sainte-Brigitte-de-Laval	110.59	9.62	3492	11.46
Stoneham-et-Tewkesbury	32.44	2.82	262	0.85
Totals	1149.77	100	30,173	100

=== Tributaries ===
The larger tributaries of the Montmorency River are (downstream default sorting order):

Name	Length (km)	Size of sub-basin (km^{2})	Left or right tributary
Noire	24.5	68.3	Left
des Neiges	36.6	372.8	Left
de la Décharge/Smith	15.5	63.9	Left
de l'Île	11.0	81.8	Right
aux Pins	–	–	Right
Ferrée	16.8	–	Left

=== Course of the Montmorency River ===
From Moran Lake (length: 1.0 kilometre (0.62 mi); altitude: 845 metres (2,772 ft)), the course of the Montmorency River descends on 103.7 kilometres (64.4 mi), with a drop of 841 metres (2,759 ft), according to the following segments:

Upper course of the Montmorency River (segment of 41.8 kilometres (26.0 mi) of which 35.4 kilometres (22.0 mi) in Laurentides Wildlife Reserve and 6.4 kilometres (4.0 mi) in Montmorency Forest)

- 3.6 kilometres (2.2 mi) towards the south-west, in particular by crossing Lac Subulé (length: 0.4 kilometres (0.25 mi); altitude: 875 metres (2,871 ft)), collecting the outlet (coming from the east) of Lac Alyse, crossing two marsh zones, to the outlet (coming from the northwest) of Lac Montmorency;
- 9.4 kilometres (5.8 mi) to the south by collecting a stream (coming from the northeast), up to the outlet (coming from the southeast) of Lac Lachance;
- 8.1 kilometres (5.0 mi) to the south by collecting the discharge (coming from the east) from Lac Absolon, by bending towards the west to a bend corresponding to the confluence of the Brûlés stream (coming from the west);
- 9.0 kilometres (5.6 mi) to the south, collecting Murphy Creek (coming from the east), then slightly southwest to a bend in the river where the course goes to the south- east along route 175, then across the Marre du Sault (length: 3.3 kilometres (2.1 mi); altitude: 770 metres (2,530 ft)) on its full length to the dam located at its mouth. Note: The outlet of Lac Provençal is discharged on the northeast bank of the Mare du Sault;
- 11.7 kilometres (7.3 mi) towards the south-east by collecting the discharge (coming from the south) from Lac Forestier, the discharge (coming from the north) from Lac Élois, the discharge (coming from the south) from Lac Pasquin, the outlet (coming from the northeast) from Lac Laflamme, the outlet (coming from the west) from Lac Piché, to the Noire River (coming from the North). Note: In the last 6.4 kilometres (4.0 mi) of this segment, the course of the river crosses the Montmorency Forest;

Intermediate course of the Montmorency River, downstream of the Black River (segment of 15.6 kilometres (9.7 mi) of which 6.3 kilometres (3.9 mi) in the Montmorency Forest)

- 3.0 kilometres (1.9 mi) south in a deep valley of the Montmorency Forest, to the Blanche River (coming from the northeast);
- 7.4 kilometres (4.6 mi) towards the south in a deep valley and bending, of which the first 3.1 kilometres (1.9 mi) in Montmorency Forest, towards the east to the stream of the North (coming from the south);
- 5.2 kilometres (3.2 mi) towards the east in a deep valley, until the confluence of the rivière des Neiges (coming from the north);

Intermediate course of the Montmorency River, downstream from the Rivière des Neiges (segment of 29.4 kilometres (18.3 mi))

- 5.6 kilometres (3.5 mi) towards the south-east in a deep valley by collecting the Cauchon stream (coming from the north), then bending towards the south, until the confluence of the Smith River (coming from the east);
- 6.0 kilometres (3.7 mi) in a deep valley to the south passing in front of "Le Club-Banc-de-Sable" and "Le Grand-Club", collecting the Swain stream (coming from the west) and Jos-Bédard stream (coming from the east), up to a bend corresponding to the confluence of the Rouge River (coming from the east);
- 12.3 kilometres (7.6 mi) in a deep valley towards the west, then the southwest by collecting the stream of Déboulis (coming from the west), the stream of the Beaver (coming from the east); by bending towards the southeast by collecting the Brebel stream (coming from the northeast); south by collecting Verret stream (coming from the east); then south-west to the confluence of the Rivière à l'Île (coming from the northwest);
- 4.4 kilometres (2.7 mi) towards the south while bending towards the south-west to bypass the "Montagne Thomassin", until the confluence of the Richelieu River (coming from the northwest) located in the heart of Sainte-Brigitte-de-Laval;
- 1.1 kilometres (0.68 mi) to the south by crossing a series of rapids, until the confluence of the Rivière aux Pins (coming from the west);

Lower course of the Montmorency River (segment of 16.9 kilometres (10.5 mi))

- 2.4 kilometres (1.5 mi) towards the south by first forming a curve towards the east, then towards the southwest, until the confluence of the Euclid stream (coming from the west), ie in the hamlet Moulin-Vallière. Note: The east bank of this segment is located at the foot of the steep cliff of a mountain whose highest peak reaches 330 kilometres (210 mi), while the west bank is inhabited;
- 4.3 kilometres (2.7 mi) towards the south-east, in particular by bypassing Île Enchanteresse (hamlet of L'Île-Enchanteresse) and three other islands, until the confluence of the Rivière du Lac (coming from the west);
- 7.0 kilometres (4.3 mi) towards the south-east by forming a large detour towards the north to bypass the hamlet "Les Trois-Saults" and crossing on 3.3 kilometres (2.1 mi) an area of rapids which ends in the south-west of the hamlet "Les Hauts-Bois-de-la-Montmorency", up to the confluence of the Ferrée river (coming from the northeast);
- 2.5 kilometres (1.6 mi) to the east, forming a large S, crossing the Barrage des Marches Naturelles and passing under the bridge of the route 360, until Montmorency Falls;
- 0.7 kilometres (0.43 mi) towards the south-east by crossing the Sugar Loaf Basin and passing under the railway bridge, until its mouth corresponding to the bridges of the highway 40.

The Montmorency River flows on the northwest bank of the Saint-Laurent River via the Île d'Orléans Channel. This confluence is located opposite the Île-d'Orléans Bridge and downstream from Old Quebec.

== History ==
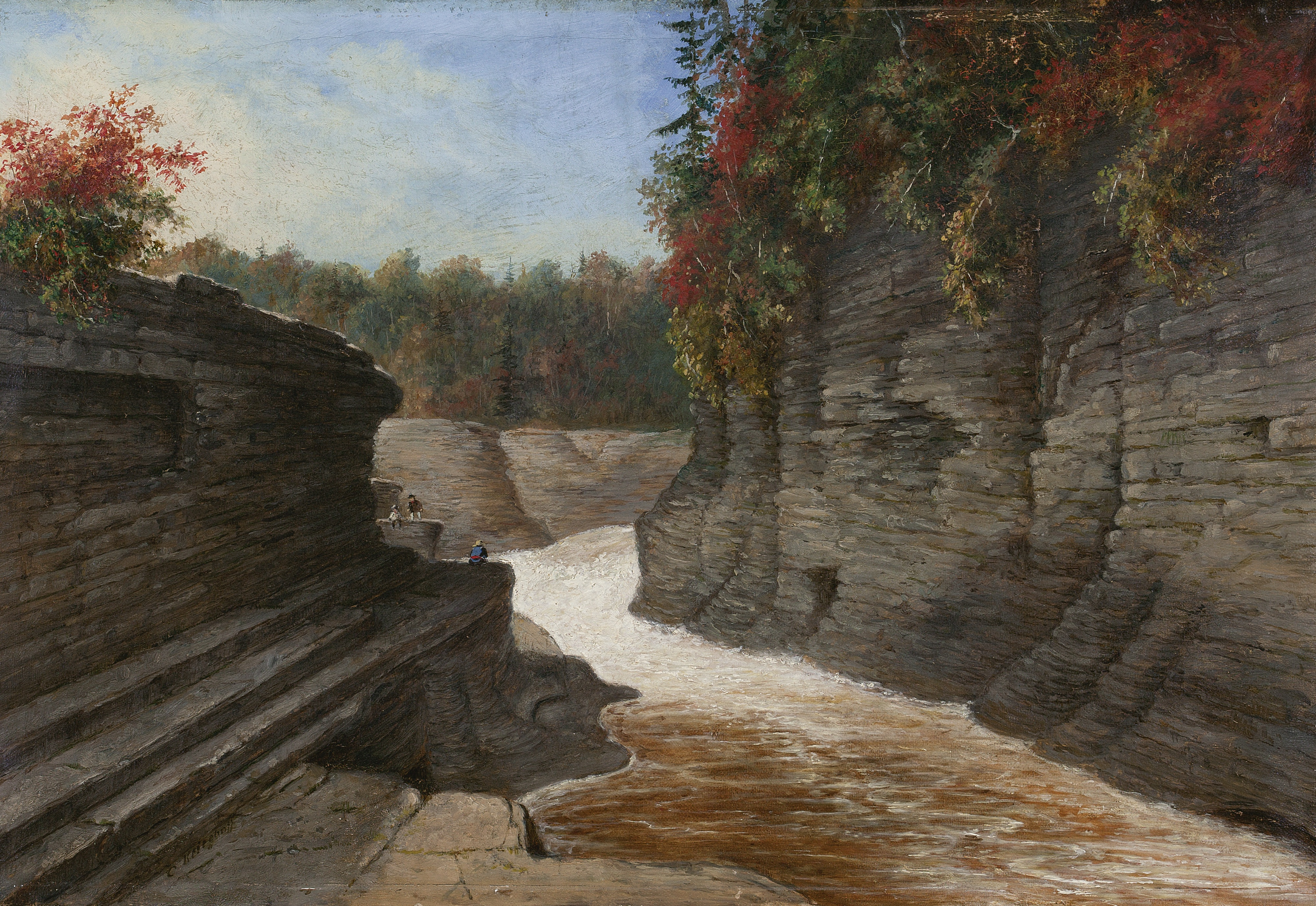
A painting of the Montmorency River, c. 1858

In 1608, Samuel de Champlain visited the falls at the mouth of the river and named it le grand saut de Montmorency ("the great falls of Montmorency") in honour of Charles de Montmorency (1537–1612), to whom Champlain had dedicated his explorations. The name of the falls came to be applied to the whole river, as the 1641 map by Jean Bourdon showed it as "Saut de Montmorency".

French colonization along the Montmorency River initially occurred at the mouth and falls only. The town of Boischatel was settled circa 1664.

In 1759, the Montmorency River formed a major obstacle to English General James Wolfe that prevented him from invading Quebec City from the east and subsequently forced him to scale the cliffs west of the city and battle the French on the Plains of Abraham. Remnants of an earthen fort built by Wolfe can still be found on the east side of the falls.

In the 19th century, colonization and logging of the interior really took off, and settlers came to the Sainte-Brigitte-de-Laval area in 1830. The river was used for log driving and its shores became industrialized when a hydro-electric dam and sawmill were built at the top and foot of the Montmorency Falls respectively. After the logging period ended, textile industry developed at the mouth of the river.

In 1992, the area surrounding the falls and mouth of the river was made into a park and developed for tourism with new viewing platforms, stairs, pedestrian bridge, aerial tram, restaurant, and visitor's centre.

== Development and use ==
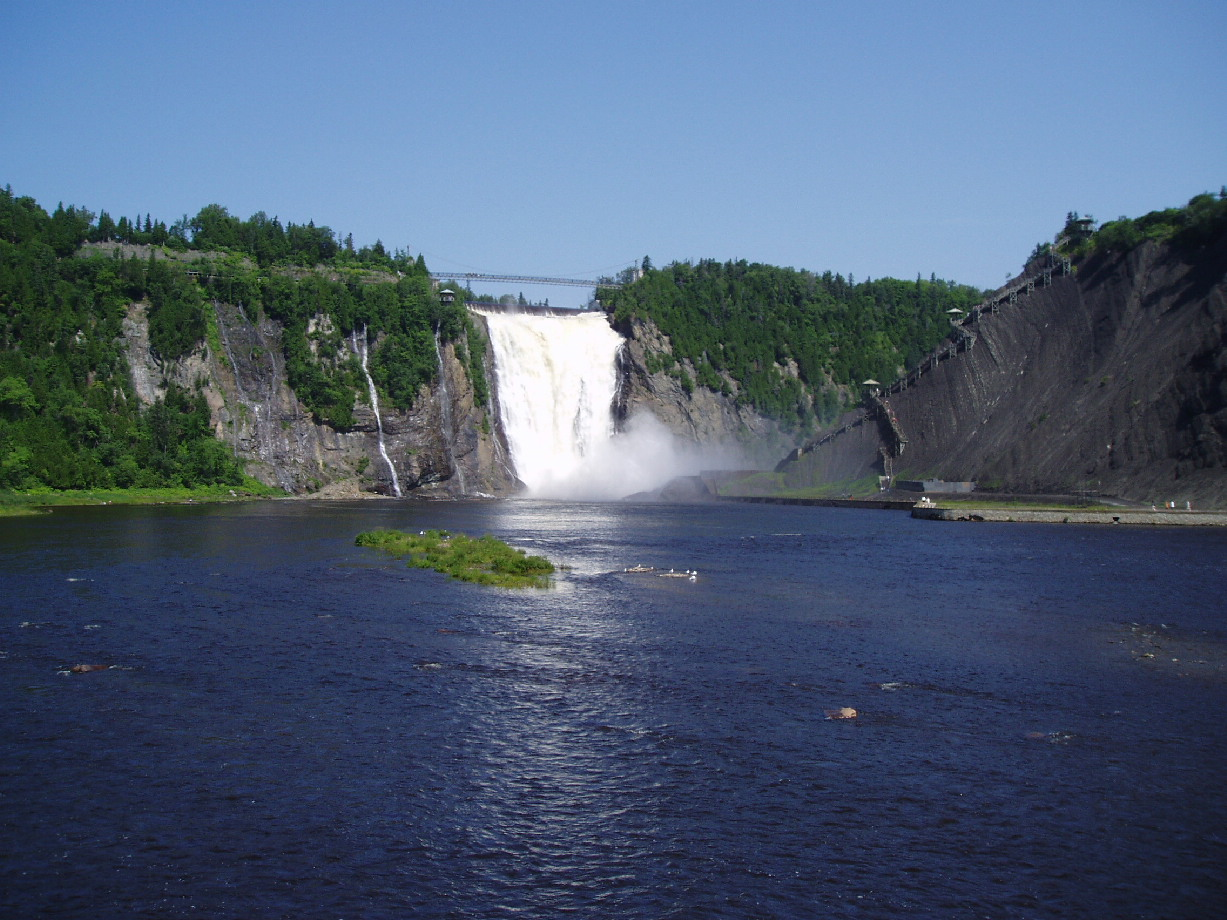
Montmorency Falls

There are 48 dams in all on the Montmorency River and its tributaries. Of these, 14 are used to regulate water flow, five to provide drinking water, and only one is used exclusively for hydro-electric power generation. The Hydro-Québec power station at the Montmorency Falls is no longer in operation, but not far upstream is the Marches-Naturelles Hydro-electric Power Station. It has an installed capacity of 4.16 MW.

All municipalities along its course rely on the Montmorency or tributaries for its drinking water supply. Only Sainte-Brigitte-de-Laval treats its waste waters before pumping it back into the Montmorency. Boischatel and Beauport put their wastewater into the Saint Lawrence River. The municipalities of L’Ange-Gardien, Château-Richer, Lac-Beauport, Stoneham-et-Tewkesbury do not impact the water quality of the Montmorency since their population centres lie outside the rivers basin, and therefore the water quality is very good.

A total of 76 bridges cross the Montmorency River. Of these, only three are public road bridges: Quebec Route 40, Avenue Royale between Beauport and Boischatel, and one at Enchanteresse Island.

== Fauna ==
The four most dominant fish species within the Montmorency basin are the rainbow trout, lake trout, Arctic char, and especially brook trout. Other species include the longnose sucker, white sucker, slimy sculpin, and pearl dace.

There are two species of reptiles: common garter snake and red-bellied snake. In addition, there are eight species of amphibians: American toad, wood frog, green frog, spring peeper, red-backed salamander, dusky salamander, northern two-lined salamander, and eastern newt.

== Toponymy ==
The explorer Samuel de Champlain named the fall located near the mouth of this watercourse "le grand saut de Montmorency" (English: "the big jump of Montmorency") on his map of 1608. Subsequently, the name of this fall attributed to the river. The map of Jean Bourdon, dated approximately 1641, indicates / Rivière Saut de Montmorency ". This toponymic designation evokes the memory of a member of the illustrious house of Montmorency, Charles de Montmorency (1537-1612), lord of Méru, Duke of Damville and admiral of France and Brittany, to whom Champlain had dedicated his exploration account of 1603.

The toponym "Montmorency River" was formalized on December 5, 1968 at the Commission de toponymie du Québec.

== See also ==
- St. Lawrence River
- La Côte-de-Beaupré Regional County Municipality
  - Lac-Jacques-Cartier, an unorganized territory
  - Château-Richer, a municipality
  - L'Ange-Gardien, a municipality
  - Boischatel, a municipality
- La Jacques-Cartier Regional County Municipality
  - Sainte-Brigitte-de-Laval, a municipality
- Agglomération de Québec.
- Montmorency Forest
- Ferrée River, a tributary
- Rouge River, a tributary
- Smith River, a tributary
- Blanche River, a tributary
- Noire River, a tributary
- Rivière des Neiges, a tributary
- Rivière du Lac, a tributary
- Rivière aux Pins, a tributary
- Richelieu River, a tributary
- Rivière à l'Île, a tributary
- Montmorency Falls
- Chenal de l'Île d'Orléans
- List of rivers of Quebec
