= Bras Nord-Ouest =

- Location within Quebec

Location
- Country: Canada
- Province: Quebec
- Region: Capitale-Nationale
- Regional County Municipality: La Côte-de-Beaupré Regional County Municipality
- Municipality: L'Ange-Gardien

Physical characteristics
- Source: Little unidentified lake
  - location: L'Ange-Gardien
  - coordinates: 46°59′56″N 71°07′54″W
  - elevation: 351 m
- Mouth: Lac la Retenue
  - location: L'Ange-Gardien
  - coordinates: 46°58′26″N 71°08′32″W
  - elevation: 197 m
- Length: 48 km (30 mi)

Basin features
- Tributaries
  - left: (Upward from the mouth) Discharge from a small lake, two streams.
  - right: (Upward from the mouth) Discharge from a small lake, discharge from a small lake, two streams.

The Bras Nord-Ouest (English: North-West Branch) is a tributary of the north shore of lac la Retenue, on the north shore of the St. Lawrence River. It flows in the municipality of L'Ange-Gardien, in the regional county municipality (MRC) of La Côte-de-Beaupré Regional County Municipality, in the administrative region of Capitale-Nationale, in the province of Quebec, in Canada.

The lower part of this valley (north of Lac la Retenue) is served by de la Vallée, des Montagnes and de la Rivière streets.

The surface of the Northwest Arm is generally frozen from the beginning of December until the end of March; however, safe traffic on the ice is generally from mid-December to mid-March. The water level of the river varies with the seasons and the precipitation; the spring flood occurs in March or April.

== Geography ==
The North-West Arm takes its source from a small forest lake (length: 0.13 kilometres (0.081 mi); altitude: 351 metres (1,152 ft)). This source is located in a cuvée between mountain peaks (altitude: 500 m to the south and 634 m to the southwest) in the municipality of Château-Richer, at:

- 3.6 kilometres (2.2 mi) east of a curve of the Montmorency River;
- 3.1 kilometres (1.9 mi) north of the confluence of the Bras Nord-Ouest and Lac la Retenue;
- 8.7 kilometres (5.4 mi) north-west of the north-west bank of the St. Lawrence River.

From its source, the North-West Arm descends on 4 kilometres (2.5 mi), with a drop of 154 metres (505 ft) according to the following segments:

- 1.9 kilometres (1.2 mi) south-west in a deep valley and crossing a small lake (altitude: 353 metres (1,158 ft)), then curving south at the end of the segment, until the outlet (coming from the west) of a small lake;
- 1.3 kilometres (0.81 mi) towards the south-east down the mountain in a deep valley, to a bend of the river corresponding to the discharge (coming from the south-west) of a stream;
- 1.6 kilometres (0.99 mi) first towards the east first in the forest zone, then agricultural, bending towards the south to collect the discharge (coming from the east) of a small lake, and crossing a small lake, then bending west at the end of the segment, to its mouth.

The North-West Arm flows into a forest islet at the bottom of a bay on the north shore] of Lac la Retenue which is crossed to the south-east by the Ferrée River.

From the confluence of the North-West Arm, the current crosses 0.5 kilometres (0.31 mi) southwards Lac la Retenue first by an L-shaped bay, up to the dam; flows south on 1.5 kilometres (0.93 mi) via Rivière la Retenue; on 11.5 kilometres (7.1 mi) generally towards the southeast following the course of the Ferrée river; then on 3.2 kilometres (2.0 mi) east by the course of the Montmorency River, to the northwest shore of the Saint-Laurent river.

== Toponymy ==
The toponym "Bras Nord-Ouest" was formalized on March 6, 1975, at the Commission de toponymie du Québec.

== Appendices ==
- La Côte-de-Beaupré Regional County Municipality
- L'Ange-Gardien, a municipality
- Lac la Retenue
- Rivière du Petit Pré
- Rivière la Retenue
- Ferrée River
- Montmorency River
- List of rivers of Quebec

=== Bibliography ===
- Charlevoix-Montmorency watershed organization (2015). Charlevoix-Montmorency water master plan (PDF). p. 75. Archived from the original (PDF) on 2016-11-25.(in French)
