= Lac la Retenue =

Lake in Capitale-Nationale, Quebec, Canada

- Location within Quebec
- Location: L'Ange-Gardien, La Jacques-Cartier Regional County Municipality (MRC), Capitale-Nationale, Quebec, Canada
- Coordinates: 46°59′09″N 71°07′46″W
- Primary inflows: Rivière la Retenue, Bras Nord-Ouest.
- Primary outflows: Rivière la Retenue
- Basin countries: Canada
- Max. length: 07 km (4.3 mi)
- Max. width: 0.3 km (0.19 mi)
- Surface elevation: 197 m (646 ft)
- Settlements: L'Ange-Gardien

The Lac la Retenue is an artificial body of water crossed by the rivière la Retenue, a tributary of the Ferrée River. This lake is located northeast of the city of Quebec, in the municipality of L'Ange-Gardien, in the La Jacques-Cartier Regional County Municipality, in the administrative region of Capitale-Nationale, in the province of Quebec, in Canada.

Lac Savane is served on the north side by rue de la Vallée, on the east side by chemin Turgeon, on the south side by chemin du Lac la Retenu Sud and on the west side by chemin Lucien Lefrançois. This lake is located in the heart of a residential area in L'Ange-Gardien.

The surface of Lac la Retenue is generally frozen from the beginning of December until the end of March; however, safe traffic on the ice is generally from mid-December to mid-March. The water level of the lake varies with the seasons and the precipitation; the spring flood occurs in March or April.

== Geography ==
With a length of 0.7 kilometres (0.43 mi), this artificial lake receives the waters of the North-West Arm which pours into the bottom of an L-shaped bay with a length of 0.3 km. Lac la Retenue has two outlets: outlet of the rivière la Retenue (main waterway) and the rivière du Petit Pré (secondary effluent) which rises on the south side of the dam.

The mouth of this artificial lake is located at:

- 6.4 kilometres (4.0 mi) north-west of downtown L'Ange-Gardien;
- 7.9 kilometres (4.9 mi) north of the mouth of the rivière la Retenue;
- 9.1 kilometres (5.7 mi) north of the mouth of the Montmorency River;
- 6.8 kilometres (4.2 mi) northwest of the northwest shore of the St. Lawrence River.

From its mouth, the current descends on 1.5 kilometres (0.93 mi) following the course of the rivière la Retenue, on 11.5 kilometres (7.1 mi) generally towards the south following the course of the Ferrée river; then on 3.2 kilometres (2.0 mi) towards the east by the course of the Montmorency River, until the northwest bank of the Saint-Laurent river.

== Toponymy ==
The name of the lake borrows that of the dam which retains the waters of the Retained River. The initial infrastructure would have been built under the aegis of Monsignor de Laval. Under the French Regime, a canal was built from this artificial lake, making it possible to feed the Petit Pré river and the mill river.

The toponym "Lac Savane" was formalized on December 5, 1968, at the Place Names Bank of the Commission de toponymie du Québec.
