= Valin River (La Côte-de-Beaupré) =

River in La Côte-de-Beaupré Regional County Municipality, Quebec, Canada

- Location within Quebec

Location
- Country: Canada
- Province: Quebec
- Region: Capitale-Nationale
- Regional County Municipality: La Côte-de-Beaupré Regional County Municipality
- Municipality: L'Ange-Gardien and Château-Richer

Physical characteristics
- Source: Confluence of two mountain streams
  - location: L'Ange-Gardien
  - coordinates: 46°57′18″N 71°05′36″W
  - elevation: 190 m
- Mouth: St. Lawrence River
  - location: Château-Richer
  - coordinates: 46°56′22″N 71°02′56″W
  - elevation: 4 m
- Length: 50 km (31 mi)

Basin features
- Tributaries
  - left: Three unidentified stream
  - right: Three unidentified stream

The Valin River flows south, on the north shore of the St. Lawrence River, in the municipalities of L'Ange-Gardien and Château-Richer, in the La Côte-de-Beaupré Regional County Municipality in the administrative region of Capitale-Nationale, in the province of Quebec, in Canada.

The lower part of this small valley is served by avenue Royale (route 360) and route 138 which runs along the north shore of St. Lawrence River. The upper part has mountainous relief and is accessible only by secondary forest roads. Forestry is the main economic activity in this valley; agriculture (lower part) second.

The surface of the Valin River is generally frozen from the beginning of December until the end of March; however, safe traffic on the ice is generally from mid-December to mid-March. The water level of the river varies with the seasons and the precipitation; the spring flood occurs in March or April.

== Geography ==
The Valin River begins at the confluence of two streams in the mountains behind the Côte-de-Beaupré, in L'Ange-Gardien . This source is located 3.8 kilometres (2.4 mi) west of the mouth of the Valin river and 6.1 kilometres (3.8 mi) northeast of a curve of the Montmorency River.

From this source, the course of the Valin river descends on 5.0 kilometres (3.1 mi), with a drop of 186 metres (610 ft), according to the following segments:

- 1.8 kilometres (1.1 mi) to the east in a forest area curving northeast between two mountains, to a bend in the river located on the edge of the plateau of the La Grande Côte area;
- 2.7 kilometres (1.7 mi) towards the south-east first with a drop of 151 metres (495 ft) in the forest zone, then in the agricultural zone passing under the high voltage wires of Hydro -Québec and passing on the north side of the hamlet Valin, to route 138;
- 0.5 kilometres (0.31 mi) east in the agricultural zone to its mouth.

The Valin River flows into Château-Richer into a small bay on the northwest shore of the St. Lawrence River. This bay faces the mouth of the Pot au Beurre river of Île d'Orléans which is 1.5 kilometres (0.93 mi) via the chenal de l'Île d'Orléans. This mouth is located between the hamlet Valin (located on the south side), north of the "La Longue Pointe" area and south of the "Battures des Îlets" area. This confluence is located 3.8 kilometres (2.4 mi) north of the center of the village of L'Ange-Gardien, 13.9 kilometres (8.6 mi) south of the center of Beaupré and 8.9 kilometres (5.5 mi) north of the bridge connecting Île d'Orléans to L'Ange-Gardien.

== Toponymy ==
The toponym "Rivière Valin" was formalized on August 31, 1971, at the Place Names Bank of the Commission de toponymie du Québec.

== See also ==
- Chenal de l'Île d'Orléans
- Château-Richer, a municipality
- L'Ange-Gardien, a municipality
- La Côte-de-Beaupré Regional County Municipality
- Capitale-Nationale, an administrative region
- St. Lawrence River
- List of rivers of Quebec
