= Boischatel =

- Municipality
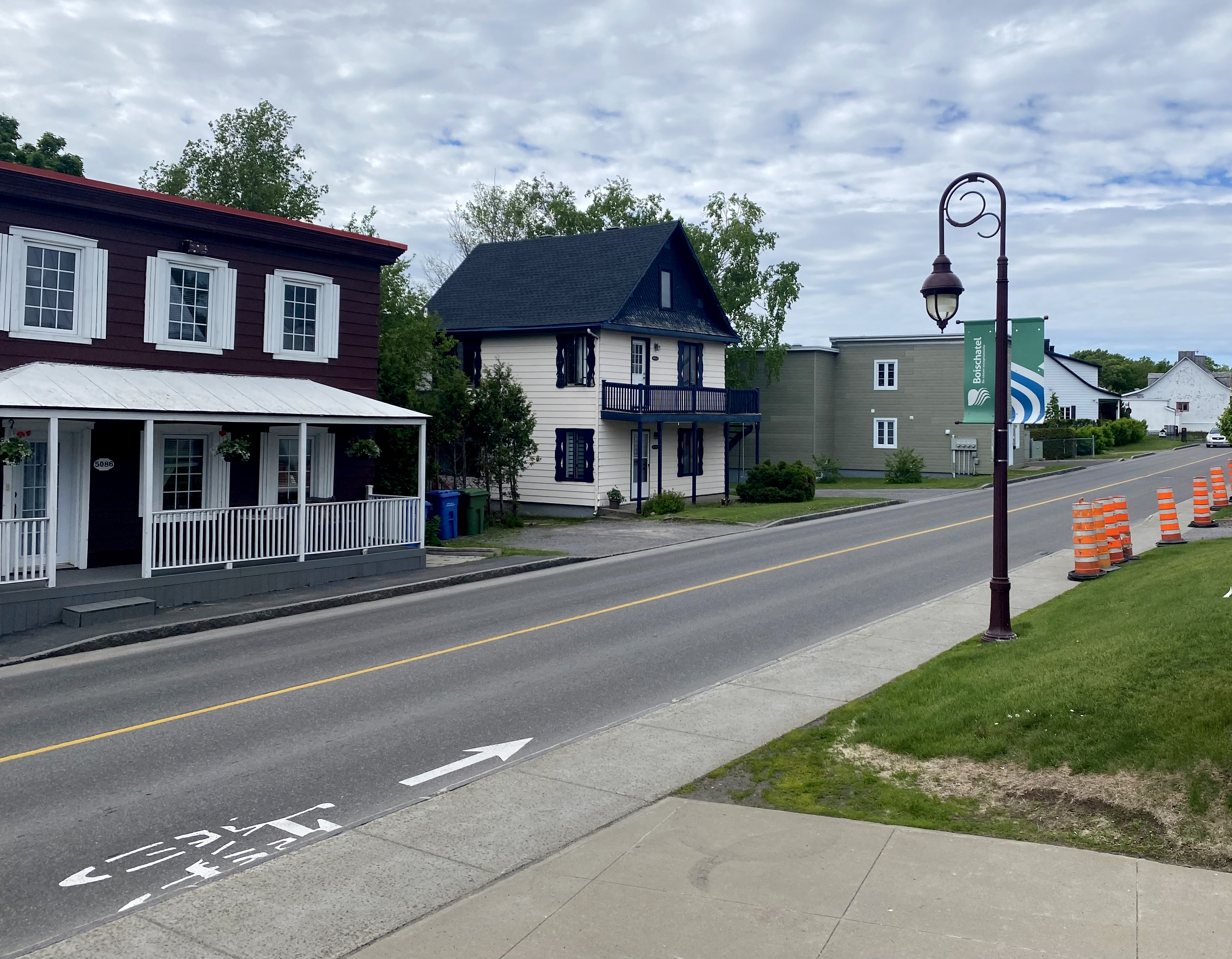

- Coat of arms
- Motto: Labeur et Courage
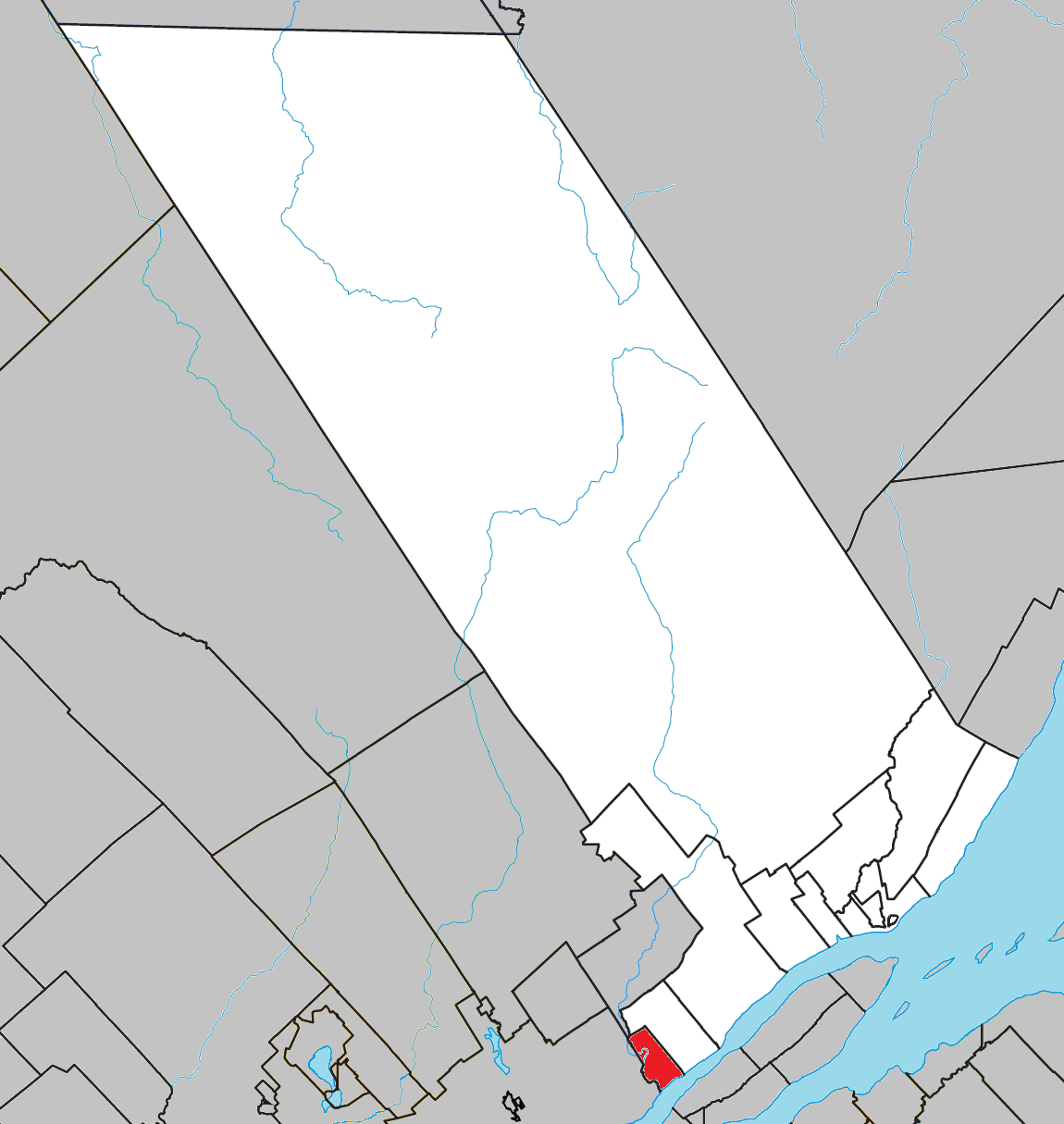
- Location within La Côte-de-Beaupré RCM

- Location in central Quebec
- Coordinates: 46°54′N 71°09′W
- Country: Canada
- Province: Quebec
- Region: Capitale-Nationale
- RCM: La Côte-de-Beaupré
- Constituted: April 3, 1920

Government
  - Mayor: Benoit Bouchard
  - Fed. riding: Montmorency—Charlevoix
  - Prov. riding: Charlevoix–Côte-de-Beaupré

Area
  - Total: 21.61 km^{2} (8.34 sq mi)
  - Land: 20.36 km^{2} (7.86 sq mi)

Population (2021)
  - Total: 8,231
  - Density: 404.3/km^{2} (1,047/sq mi)
  - Pop (2016-21): ▲8.5%
  - Dwellings: 3,128
- Time zone: UTC−5 (EST)
  - Summer (DST): UTC−4 (EDT)
- Postal code(s): G0A 1H0
- Area codes: 418 and 581
- Highways: R-138 R-360
- Website: www.boischatel.ca

Boischatel (French pronunciation: [bwaʃatɛl]) is a municipality in the Capitale-Nationale region of Quebec, Canada. The town was originally called Saint-Jean-de-Boischatel.

== Geography ==
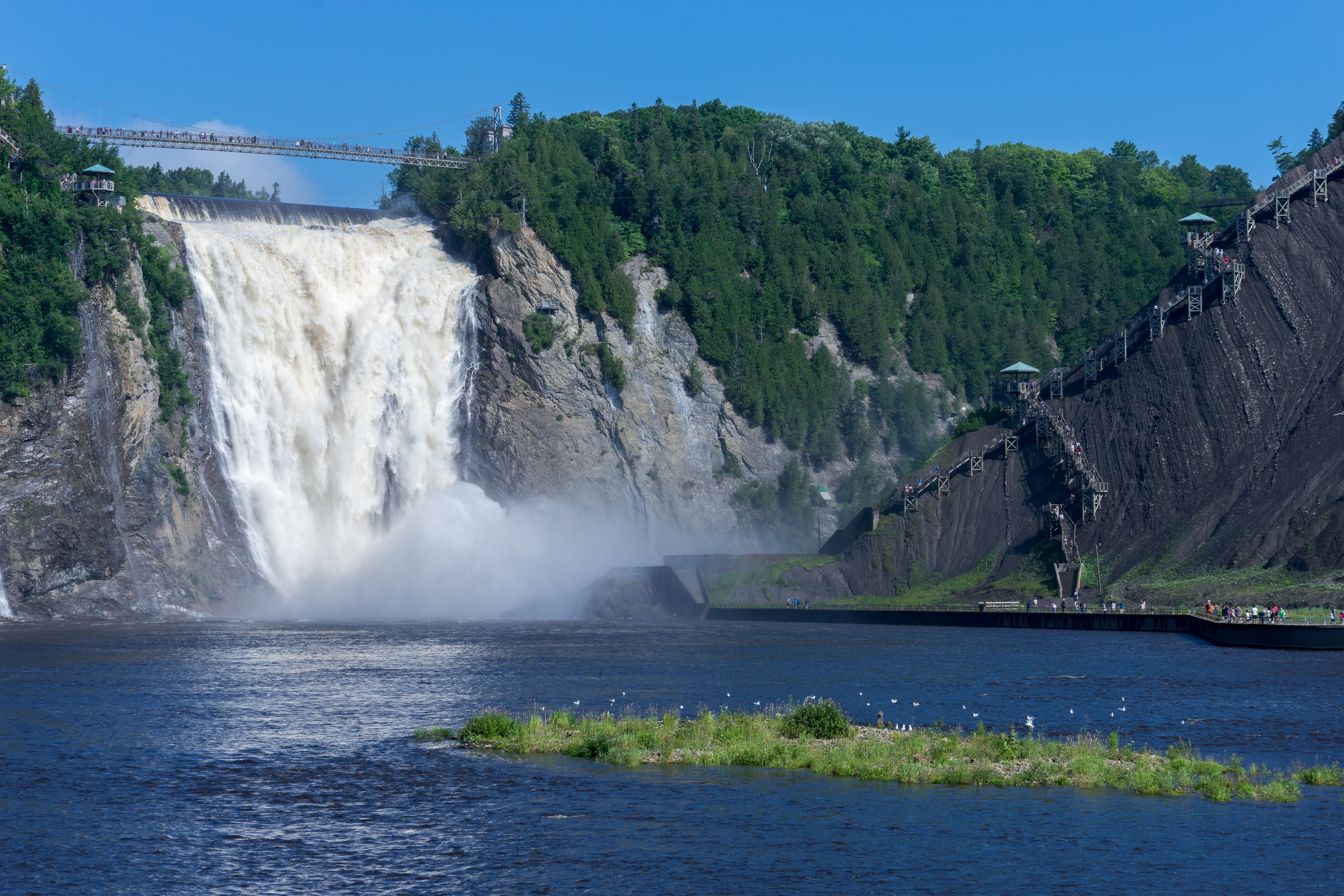
Montmorency Falls

The town itself is located along the Montmorency River and St. Lawrence River. Near the boundary with Beauport are the Montmorency Falls, where 35,000 litres of water per second fall from a height one-and-a-half times greater than that of Niagara Falls.

Rivers flowing through Boischatel:

- Chenal de l'Île d'Orléans
- Ferrée River
- Montmorency River
- St. Lawrence River

== History ==
The area was originally settled around 1664 and called Sault (old French for "waterfall"), due to its proximity to the Montmorency Falls.

The Village Municipality of Saint-Jean-de-Boischatel was formed in 1920 when it ceded from Ange-Gardien, with Séraphin Vézina as its first mayor. It was named in honor of Jean-François de Beauchatel, first aide-de-camp to General Montcalm.

On November 23, 1991, it changed statutes and shortened its name to become the Municipality of Boischatel.

== Demographics ==
Historical census populations – Boischatel

Year	Pop.	±%
1921	571	—
1931	783	+37.1%
1941	882	+12.6%
1951	1,297	+47.1%
1956	1,461	+12.6%
1961	1,576	+7.9%

Year	Pop.	±%
1966	1,648	+4.6%
1971	1,685	+2.2%
1976	2,279	+35.3%
1981	3,345	+46.8%
1986	3,662	+9.5%
1991	3,878	+5.9%

Year	Pop.	±%
1996	4,152	+7.1%
2001	4,303	+3.6%
2006	5,287	+22.9%
2011	6,465	+22.3%
2016	7,587	+17.4%
2021	8,231	+8.5%

Source: Statistics Canada

Private dwellings occupied by usual residents (2021): 3,050 (total dwellings: 3,128)

First language (2021):

- English as first language: 0.9%
- French as first language: 96.3%
- English and French as first language: 0.6%
- Other as first language: 1.9%

== Local government ==
List of former mayors:

- Séraphin Vézina (1920–1925)
- Joseph Trudelle (1925–1929)
- Arthur Tardif (1929–1937)
- Joseph Trudelle (1937–1939)
- Joseph Racine (1939–1953)
- Maurice Huot (1953–1958)
- Rodolphe Huot (1958–1961)
- Joseph Racine (1961–1965)
- Adjutor Dussault (1965–1969)
- Roland Lavoie (1969–1987)
- Jacques Couture (1987–1994)
- Yvon Coté (1994–1998)
- Yves Germain (1998–2017)
- Benoit Bouchard (2017–present)

== See also ==
- List of municipalities in Quebec
