= Rivière du Sault à la Puce =

River in La Côte-de-Beaupré Regional County Municipality, Quebec, Canada

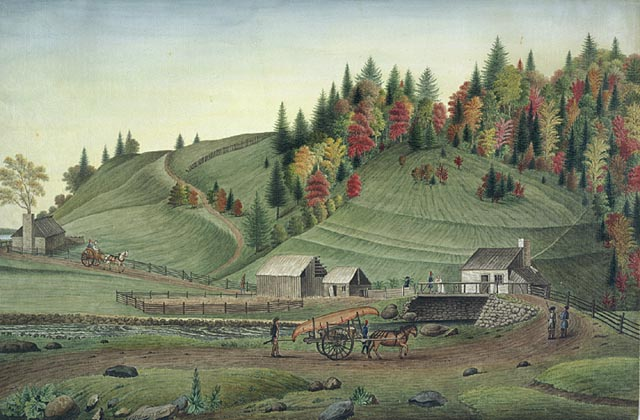

- Location within Quebec

Location
- Country: Canada
- Province: Quebec
- Region: Capitale-Nationale
- Regional County Municipality: La Côte-de-Beaupré Regional County Municipality
- Municipality: Château-Richer

Physical characteristics
- Source: Lac du Sault à la Puce
  - location: Château-Richer
  - coordinates: 47°05′41″N 71°10′29″W
  - elevation: 494 m
- Mouth: St. Lawrence River
  - location: Château-Richer
  - coordinates: 46°58′42″N 71°00′28″W
  - elevation: 4 m
- Length: 202 km (126 mi)

Basin features
- Tributaries
  - left: (upward from the mouth) Discharge from an unidentified lake, unidentified stream, two unidentified streams, discharge from a small lake, discharge from two small lakes, six unidentified streams, discharge from an unidentified lake, unidentified stream.
  - right: (upward from the mouth) Two unidentified streams, discharge from two unidentified lakes, unidentified stream, discharge from an unidentified lake, discharge from an unidentified lake, unidentified stream.

The rivière du Sault à la Puce flows south, on the north shore of the St. Lawrence River, in the municipality of Château-Richer, in the La Côte-de-Beaupré Regional County Municipality in the administrative region of Capitale-Nationale, in the province of Quebec, in Canada.

The lower part of this small valley is served by avenue Royale (route 360) and route 138 which runs along the north shore of St. Lawrence River. The road to Saint-Achillée serves the intermediate and upper part. Forestry is the main economic activity in this valley; second-hand tourist activities; agriculture (lower part) third.

The surface of the Sault à la Puce River is generally frozen from the beginning of December until the end of March; however, safe traffic on the ice is generally from mid-December to mid-March. The water level of the river varies with the seasons and the precipitation; the spring flood occurs in March or April.

== Geography ==
The main hydrographic slopes neighboring the river are:

- to the west: Le Moyne River and Cazeau River;
- north and west: Montmorency River;
- to the east: rivière des Sept Crans and Rivière aux Chiens North-West.

With a length of 20.2 kilometres (12.6 mi), the "Sault à la Puce River" rises at the lake of the same name at 494 metres (1,621 ft) above sea level, in the northern part of the municipality of Château-Richer. From the "Lac du Sault à la Puce", the river descends south on:

- 8.3 kilometres (5.2 mi) to the hamlet of Saint-Achille-de-Montmorency;
- 5.5 kilometres (3.4 mi) to the outlet of a small river coming from Saint-Ignace (from the northwest);
- 6.4 kilometres (4.0 mi) to the mouth which flows into the St. Lawrence River.

In its descent, the river a priori crosses a mountainous area. Then it flows in a series of small waterfalls, one of which reaches 18 m in the cliff known as "la Grande Côte". Then the river crosses the urban area in the hamlet "Lefrançois" and "Sault-à-la-Puce". In the area west of the mouth, a marina has been built on the St. Lawrence River and a breakwater protects the basin from strong waves.

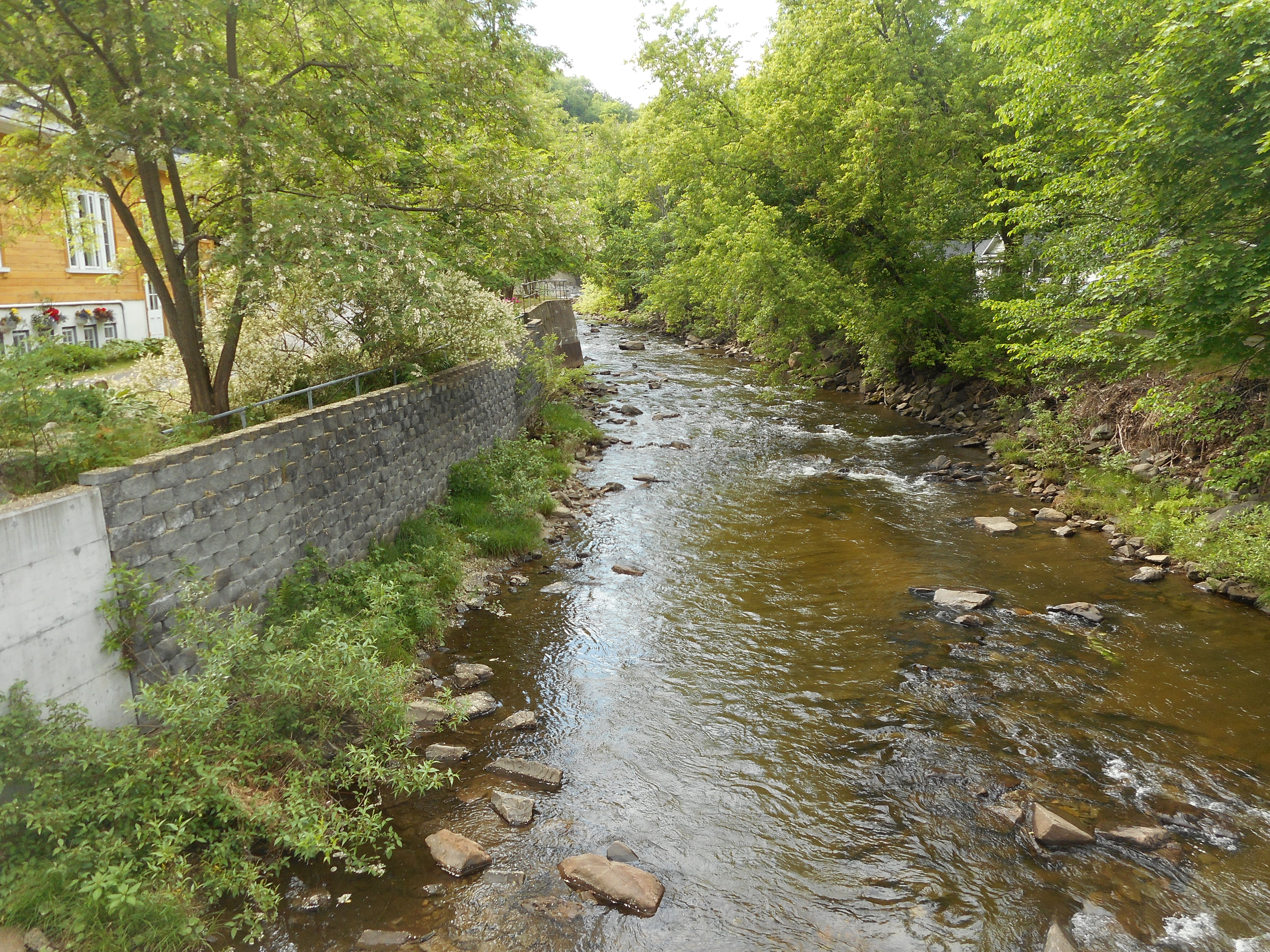
Upstream of the route 360

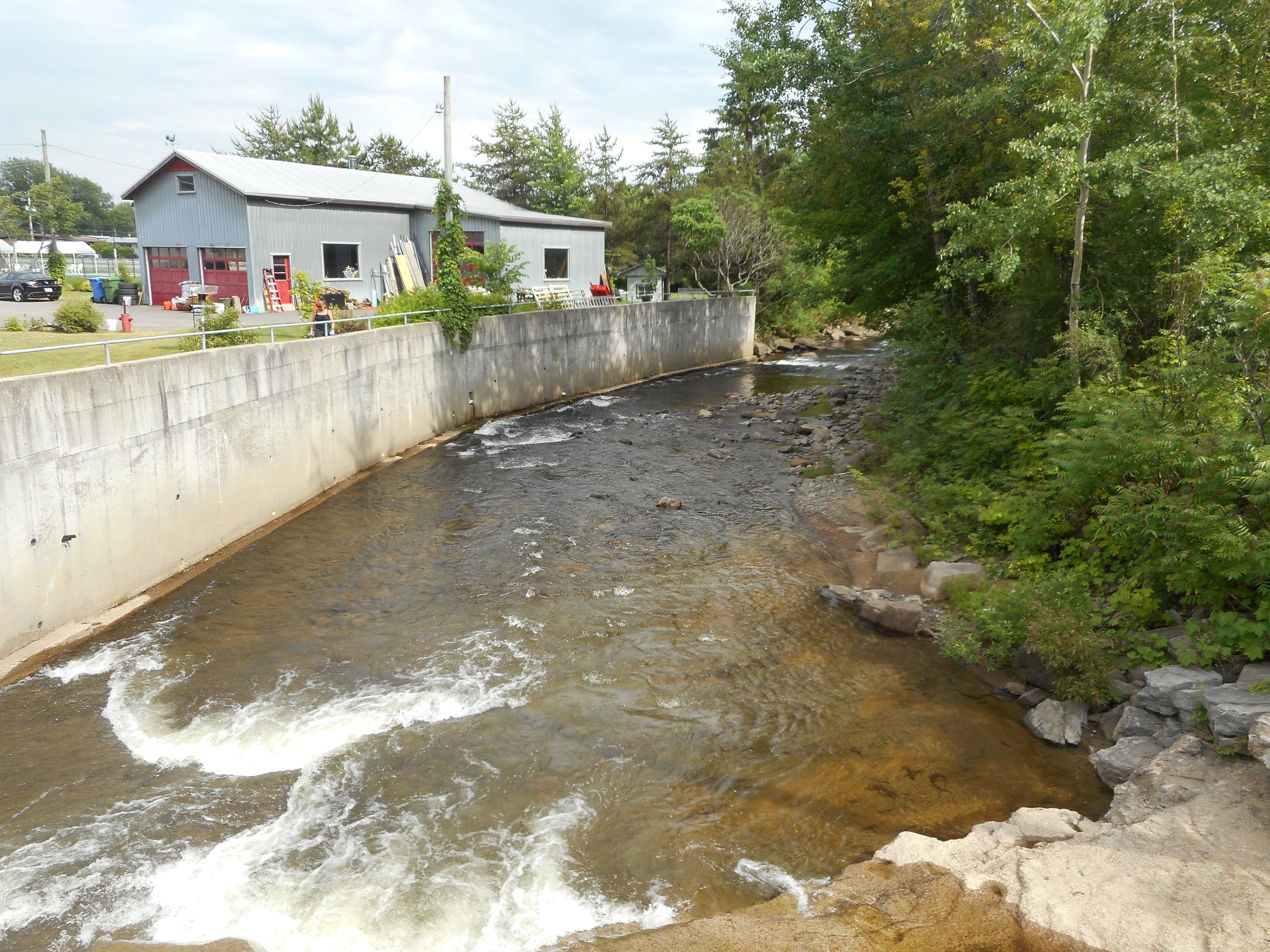
Downstream

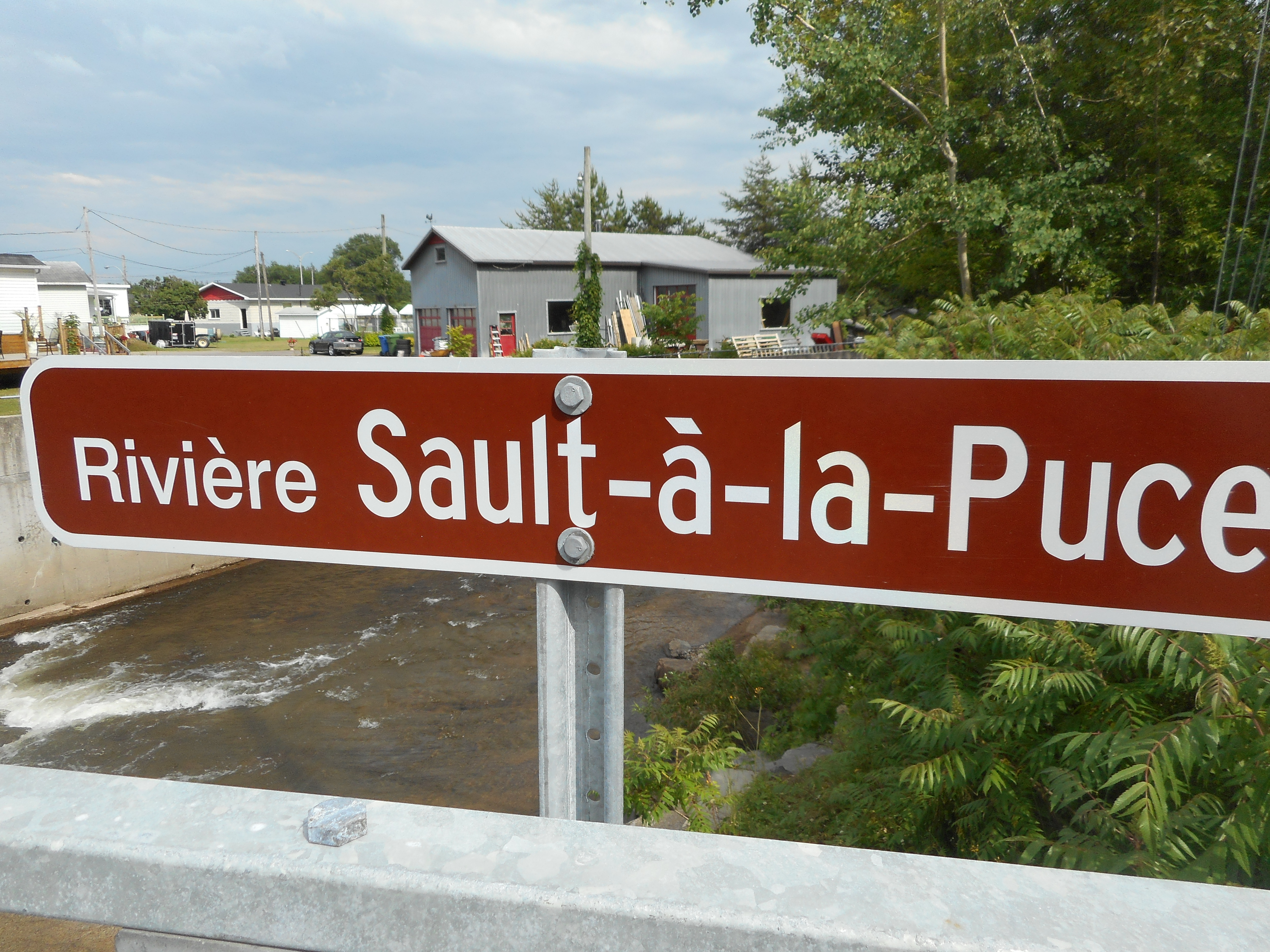

== Toponymy ==
This acronym appears on a map of 1641 designed by Jean Bourdon, under the spelling of "Rivière du Sault à la Pusse". In the work on "Geographical Names of the Province of Quebec", published in 1906, by Pierre-Georges-Roy, Lévis, page 437: "Sault à la Puce (Montmorency) - May 2, 1640, Adrien d'Abancour said the Quail and Etienne Sevestre left Quebec to go hunting in the islands. The winds having been very impetuous, they drowned. We read in the old register of Notre-Dame de Québec: "The Pulce having been despatched to draw cognizance from it, after having ransacked all the places which he drove out the caban and toured the isles and fired quantity of arquebus shots, he returned to Quebec without having learned anything about it."

This acronym evokes the memory of this citizen of Quebec who gave his surmon to the river and to the flea sault.

The toponym "Rivière du Sault à la Puce" was formalized on December 5, 1968 at the Place Names Bank of the Commission de toponymie du Québec.

== History ==
Forestry has been at the heart of the region's economic activity. The construction of a sawmill in 1940 along the "Sault à la Puce River" generated industrial activity over several years. Since the 19th century, recreational tourism activities have been enhanced in the river area. Along route 138, the restaurant, hotel and passenger services industry is highly developed. The population of Château-Richer mainly resides between the buildings of the St. Lawrence River and the "Grande Côte".

== See also ==
- Chenal de l'Île d'Orléans
- Château-Richer, a municipality
- La Côte-de-Beaupré Regional County Municipality
- Capitale-Nationale, an administrative region
- St. Lawrence River
- List of rivers of Quebec
