= Le Moyne River =

River in La Côte-de-Beaupré Regional County Municipality, Quebec, Canada

- Location within Quebec

Location
- Country: Canada
- Province: Quebec
- Region: Capitale-Nationale
- Regional County Municipality: La Côte-de-Beaupré Regional County Municipality
- Municipality: Château-Richer

Physical characteristics
- Source: Lac du Sault à la Puce
  - location: Château-Richer
  - coordinates: 47°00′20″N 71°02′28″W
  - elevation: 295 m
- Mouth: St. Lawrence River
  - location: Château-Richer
  - coordinates: 46°57′09″N 71°02′20″W
  - elevation: 4 m
- Length: 76 km (47 mi)

Basin features
- Tributaries
  - left: Unidentified stream
  - right: Unidentified stream

The Le Moyne River (French: Rivière Le Moyne, pronounced [ʁivjɛʁ lə mwan]) generally flows south, on the north shore of the St. Lawrence River, in the municipality of Château-Richer, in the La Côte-de-Beaupré Regional County Municipality in the administrative region of Capitale-Nationale, in the province of Quebec, in Canada.

The lower part of this small valley is served by avenue Royale (route 360) and route 138 which runs along the north shore of St. Lawrence River. The Chemin de la Mine, the Montée des Hirondelles and the Montée des Chênes serve the intermediate part to the foot of the moraine. The upper part has mountainous relief and some secondary forest roads, including Chemin Beauséjour, are accessible. Forestry is the main economic activity in this valley; agriculture (lower part) second.

The surface of the Le Moyne River is generally frozen from the beginning of December until the end of March; however, safe traffic on the ice is generally from mid-December to mid-March. The water level of the river varies with the seasons and the precipitation; the spring flood occurs in March or April.

== Geography ==
The Le Moyne river begins at the confluence of two streams in the mountains behind the Côte-de-Beaupré, in Château-Richer. This source is located 1.5 kilometres (0.93 mi) west of the course of the rivière du Sault à la Puce, 5.8 kilometres (3.6 mi) northwest of mouth of the Le Moyne river and 4.2 kilometres (2.6 mi) northwest of the northwest shore of the St. Lawrence River.

From this source, the course of the Le Moyne river descends on 7.6 kilometres (4.7 mi), with a drop of 291 metres (955 ft), according to the following segments:

- 2.1 kilometres (1.3 mi) towards the south-east in the forest zone, up to a bend of the river corresponding to a stream (coming from the north);
- 2.3 kilometres (1.4 mi) south on the Laurentian plateau, to a stream (coming from the northwest);
- 1.3 kilometres (0.81 mi) with a drop of 117 metres (384 ft), first towards the south to a bend in the river, then towards the northeast by rapidly descending the moraine, and finally towards the south-east, passing through the hamlet Plage-Rhéaume and crossing a small lake (length: 0.2 kilometres (0.12 mi); altitude: 68 metres (223 ft)) to its mouth;
- 1.7 kilometres (1.1 mi) to the south-east in an agricultural zone passing under the high-voltage wires of Hydro-Québec, forming an S and passing between the village Laverdière (located on the north side) and the hamlet Le Moyne (located on the south side), to route 138;
- 0.24 kilometres (0.15 mi) south-east in an agricultural zone to its mouth.

The Le Moyne River flows into Château-Richer into a small bay on the northwest shore of the St. Lawrence River. This bay faces the northern tip of Île d'Orléans which is 2.3 kilometres (1.4 mi) distant by the chenal de l'Île d'Orléans. This mouth is located between the hamlet Le Moyne (located on the south side) and the village of Laverdière. This confluence is located 5.4 kilometres (3.4 mi) north of the center of the village of L'Ange-Gardien, 2.3 kilometres (1.4 mi) south of the center of Château-Richer and 105 kilometres (65 mi) north of the bridge linking Île d'Orléans to L'Ange-Gardien.

== Toponymy ==
The name evokes the explorer Pierre LeMoyne d'Iberville.

The toponym "Rivière Lemoyne" was formalized on December 5, 1968 at the Place Names Bank of the Commission de toponymie du Québec.

== See also ==
- Chenal de l'Île d'Orléans
- Château-Richer, a municipality
- La Côte-de-Beaupré Regional County Municipality
- Capitale-Nationale, an administrative region
- St. Lawrence River
- List of rivers of Quebec
