= Rivière aux Chiens (Côte-de-Beaupré) =

River in La Côte-de-Beaupré Regional County Municipality, Quebec, Canada

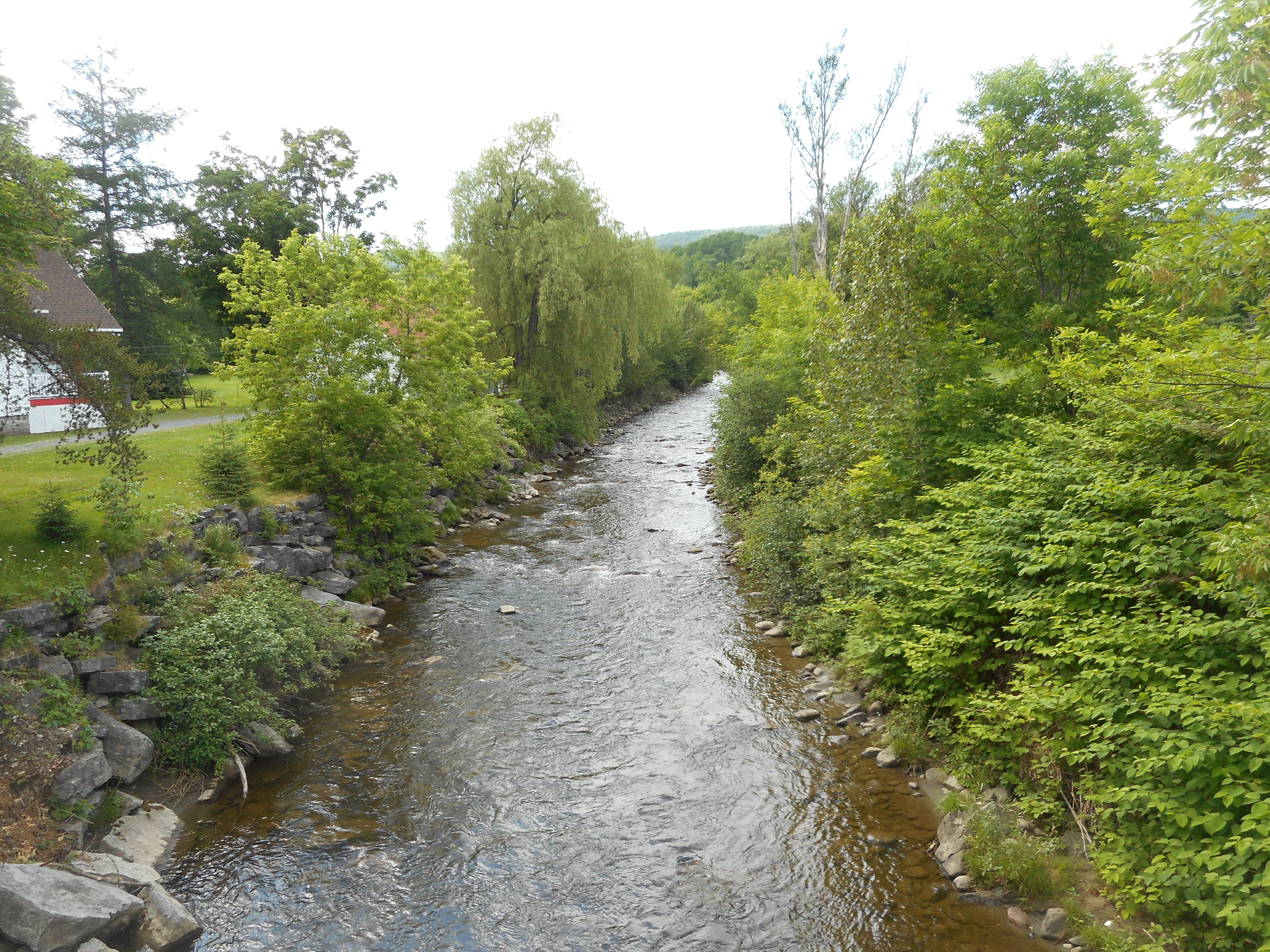
- View from the bridge of route 360, upward (toward north-west)

- Location within Quebec

Location
- Country: Canada
- Province: Quebec
- Region: Capitale-Nationale
- Regional County Municipality: La Côte-de-Beaupré Regional County Municipality
- Municipality: Beaupré and Château-Richer

Physical characteristics
- Source: Confluence of two mountain streams
  - location: Beaupré
  - coordinates: 47°07′12″N 70°58′49″W
  - elevation: 643 m
- Mouth: St. Lawrence River
  - location: Beaupré
  - coordinates: 47°00′26″N 70°57′37″W
  - elevation: 4 m
- Length: 170 km (110 mi)

Basin features
- Tributaries
  - left: (upward from the mouth) Rouge Creek, four unidentified streams, ruisseau des Prairies, unidentified stream, discharge from two unidentified lakes, and three unidentified streams.
  - right: (upward from the mouth) Four unidentified streams, Rivière des Sept Crans, thirteen unidentified streams.

The rivière aux Chiens (French pronunciation: [ʁivjɛʁ o ʃjɛ̃], river of the dogs) flows south, on the north shore of the St. Lawrence River, in the municipalities of Beaupré and Château-Richer, in the La Côte-de-Beaupré Regional County Municipality, in the administrative region of Capitale-Nationale, in the province from Quebec, to Canada. It empties into the St. Lawrence River at Beaupré.

The lower part of this small valley is served by avenue Royale (route 360) and route 138 which runs along the north shore of St. Lawrence River. The intermediate part has mountainous relief and is accessible only by the Chemin de la d'Auteuil. The upper part is served by a forest road. Forestry is the main economic activity in this valley; agriculture (in the lower plain), second.

The surface of the Rivière aux Chiens is generally frozen from the beginning of December until the end of March; however, safe traffic on the ice is generally from mid-December to mid-March. The water level of the river varies with the seasons and the precipitation; the spring flood occurs in March or April.

== Geography ==
The Rivière aux Chiens begins at the confluence of two streams in the mountains behind the Côte-de-Beaupré, north of mont Sainte-Anne, in Beaupré. This source is located 3.0 kilometres (1.9 mi) northeast of the source of the rivière des Sept Crans; 3.7 kilometres (2.3 mi) south-east of a curve of the Smith River; 8.1 kilometres (5.0 mi) west of Bourg-les-Neiges in Beaupré; and 12.6 kilometres (7.8 mi) north-west of the mouth of the Rivière aux Chiens.

From this source, the course of the Rivière aux Chiens descends on 17.0 kilometres (10.6 mi), with a drop of 639 metres (2,096 ft), according to the following segments:

- 2.5 kilometres (1.6 mi) to the south, bending to the southeast, collecting two streams (coming from the west) and three (coming from the north), crossing a series of rapids at the end of segment, to the outlet (coming from the north) of two lakes;
- 1.8 kilometres (1.1 mi) towards the south-east crossing a long series of rapids, up to a stream (coming from the north-east);
- 4.4 kilometres (2.7 mi) to the south-east, then to the south, in a deep valley, crossing several series of rapids, until the confluence of the Rivière des Sept Crans (coming from North West);
- 2.7 kilometres (1.7 mi) to the south-east in a deep valley, entirely in the rapids zone, to a stream (coming from the south-west) corresponding to the Chaudron at Gaudreault;
- 2.2 kilometres (1.4 mi) towards the south-east by forming a hook towards the west in mid-segment, crossing the Fourth Basin, then curving towards the west at the end of the segment, until the Red stream (coming from the east);
- 2.8 kilometres (1.7 mi) first towards the south by forming a loop towards the east and a hook towards the southwest to a bend in the river, then towards the east, to the route 360. Note: At the end of this segment, the course of the river passing south of the hamlet Casgrain and north of the hamlet Sainte-Anne-Ouest;
- 0.6 kilometres (0.37 mi) eastwards passing under route 138, to its mouth.

The last 1.0 kilometre (0.62 mi) of its course serves as the boundary between the municipalities of Beaupré and Château-Richer.

The Rivière aux Chiens flows into Beaupré on the northwest shore of the Saint Lawrence River. This mouth faces the northern point of Île d'Orléans which is 2.0 kilometres (1.2 mi) distant by the northern part of Chenal de l'Île d'Orléans. This mouth is located between the center of Sainte-Anne-de-Beaupré (located at 3.8 kilometres (2.4 mi) on the northeast side) and the village of Château-Richer (located at 6.2 kilometres (3.9 mi) on the southwest side). This confluence is located 19.0 kilometres (11.8 mi) northeast of the bridge connecting the Île d'Orléans to L'Ange-Gardien.

== Toponymy ==
The toponymic designation "Rivière aux Chiens" appears on two maps by Jean Bourdon (around 1641), in the singular form; this mention suggests that the toponym was in use long before.

At that time, the term "dog" in the toponym of the tributaries of the Estuary of Saint Lawrence evoked the presence of seals or sea dogs at the mouth of the river, perhaps even an area of calving. At the start of the French colony in America, the colonists slaughtered seals in front of Quebec City.

However, historians are lost in conjecture on the reason for the attribution of this name. Is he referring to seals commonly known as sea dogs or to the canine breed? In his short Toponymy essay on the Côte de Beaupré, composed on an unknown date, the redemptorist C.-E. Marquis sets out some hypotheses on the reason for attributing this toponym. One of them mentions stray dogs that the first settlers had to abandon to their fate when the Kirke brothers, who had taken and occupied Quebec from 1629 to 1632, razed the Cape Tourmente farm. A post office opened at this location, in 1893 or 1894 according to the authors, bore the name of Rivière-aux-Chiens until 1964, when it was substituted for that of Sainte-Anne-de-Beaupré - West.

The toponym "Rivière aux Chiens" was formalized on April 4, 1982 at the Place Names Bank of the Commission de toponymie du Québec.

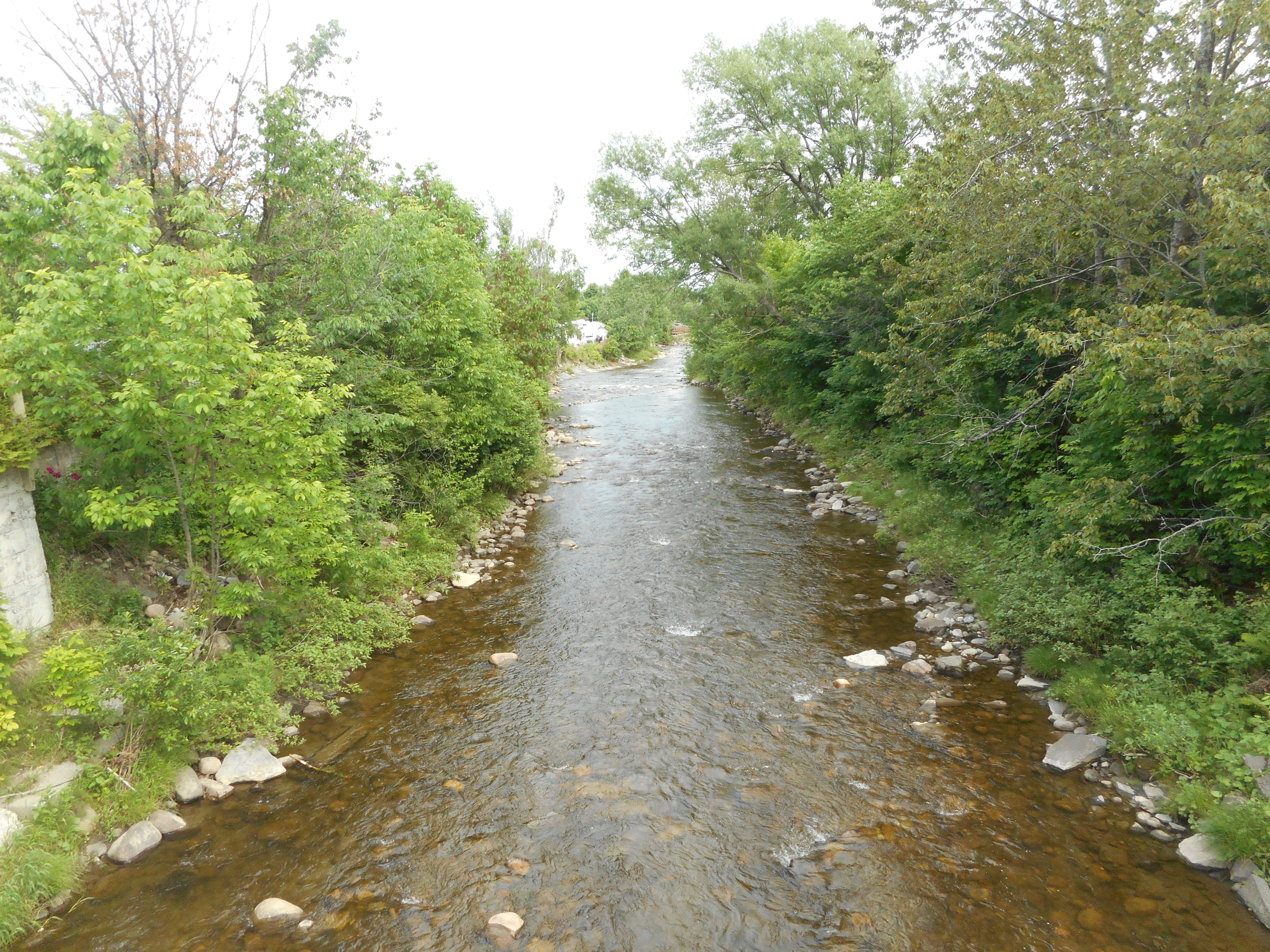
View of the bridge from route 360, looking downstream (southeast)

== See also ==
- Chenal de l'Île d'Orléans
- Beaupré, a municipality
- Château-Richer, a municipality
- La Côte-de-Beaupré Regional County Municipality
- Capitale-Nationale, an administrative region
- Rivière des Sept Crans
- St. Lawrence River
- List of rivers of Quebec
