= Centre d'Interprétation de la Côte-de-Beaupré =

Aux Trois Couvents
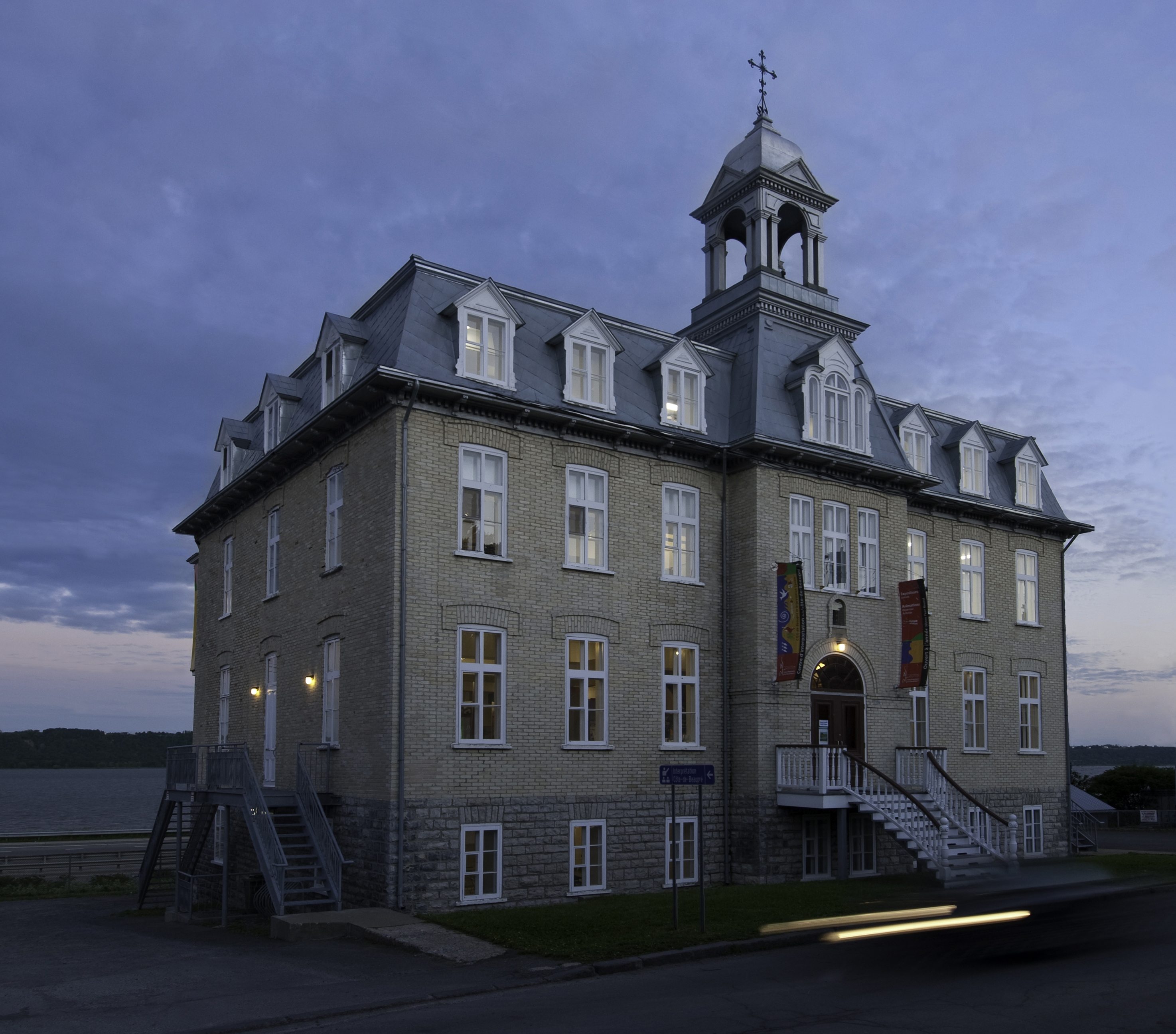
- Established: 1984
- Location: 7976 avenue Royale, Château-Richer, Quebec, Canada
- Coordinates: 46°58′08″N 71°01′07″W
- Website: www.auxtroiscouvents.org

Aux Trois Couvents, formerly known as the Centre d'interprétation de la Côte-de-Beaupré (CICB), is a museum located in Château-Richer, Quebec, Canada. The museum, recognized by the La Côte-de-Beaupré Regional County Municipality since 1996, focuses on the archaeology, history, and heritage of the Beaupré Coast region. It is a part of the Route de la Nouvelle-France group, one of the oldest roads of Quebec. It offers exhibitions as well as cultural and educational activities.

== History ==
Created in 1984, the CICB is a non-profit institution, recognized and sustained by the Ministry of Culture and Communications (Quebec). First established at the Moulin du Petit-Pré, the CICB acquired, in 2000, the old convent of Château Richer. After renovating and restoring it, the CICB moved into the former convent and in doing so quadrupled its floor space.

The CICB allows visitors the opportunity to discover aspects of the geography, history, culture and heritage of the Beaupre-Coast region.

== Exhibitions ==
The Aux Trois Couvents museum offers several exhibitions to help visitors understand the history of the region and the Château-Richer convents.

- Regards sur la Côte-de-Beaupré provides a social and historical overview of the region from colonial times down to today.
- Site archéologique des Vieux-Couvents d'hier à aujourd'hui is devoted to the history of the three convents of Château-Richer through various displays of on-site archeological finds.
- Sur les traces de l'archéologie adds to the understanding of the museum's site by retracing the location's historical context and detailing the work of modern archaeologists.
- Olivier Le Tardif introduces the first seigneur of Château-Richer as a key character in the 17th-century settlement of the region and the beginnings of New France.
- The Classe d'antan is a recreation of a typical classroom from the first half of the 20th century where visitors can see how students were taught at the time.

The museum also features educational activities and occasional temporary exhibitions.

== History of the Château-Richer convents ==
=== The First Convent ===
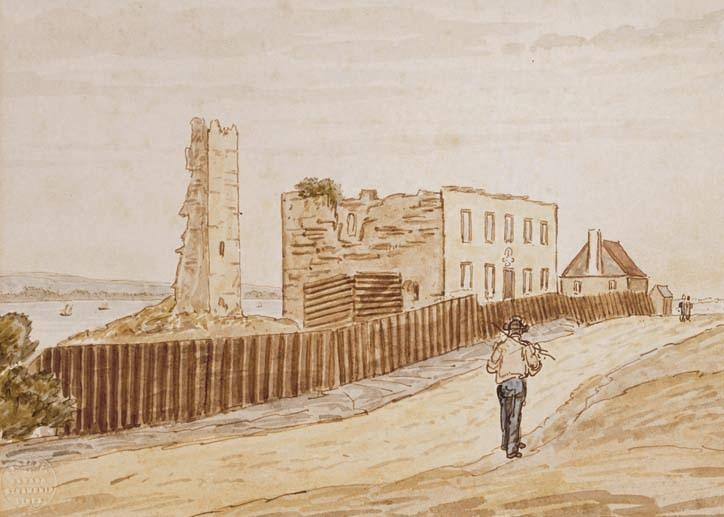
First convent

Before the construction of the original convent, the land abutting the St. Lawrence River hosted a windmill from about 1655. In 1998, archeological digs uncovered the windmill's foundations.

In 1694, François de Laval, the first bishop of New France and the former seigneur of the Beaupré coast, commissioned the construction of the first convent as a school for girls. Nuns from the congregation of Notre-Dame, under the direction of Marguerite Bourgeoys, became teachers for the girls of the region. Three nuns, one as superior and two as teachers, taught young girls how to read, write and count. They also taught them history, geography, religion, as well as housework. Boys were instead schooled at the local manor. In 1759, the British invasion force under the command of General James Wolfe captured all the resources they could take and, before the decisive battle, burned down many farms and buildings, including the original convent.

=== Second Convent ===
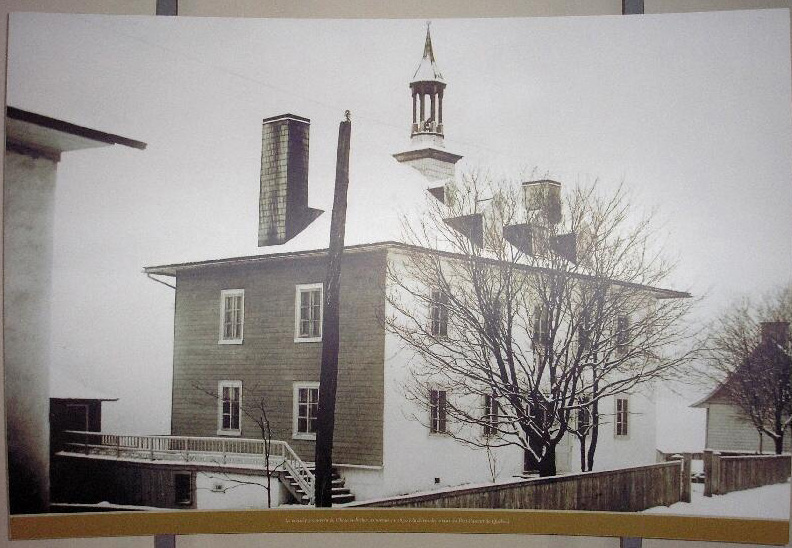
The second convent in Château-Richer, built in 1830

In 1829, the second convent was built on the original foundations. Starting in 1830, it served once again as a school for girls with a different religious order, the Congregation of Our Lady of Charity of the Good Shepherd. Despite numerous repairs and upgrades, the new building soon deteriorated as a result of recurrent flooding and poor drainage. The damp and the contamination of drinking water by the nearby latrines led to the spread of disease among the teachers and students. In 1906, the building was demolished in order to allow for the construction of a newer, better planned building.

=== Third Convent ===
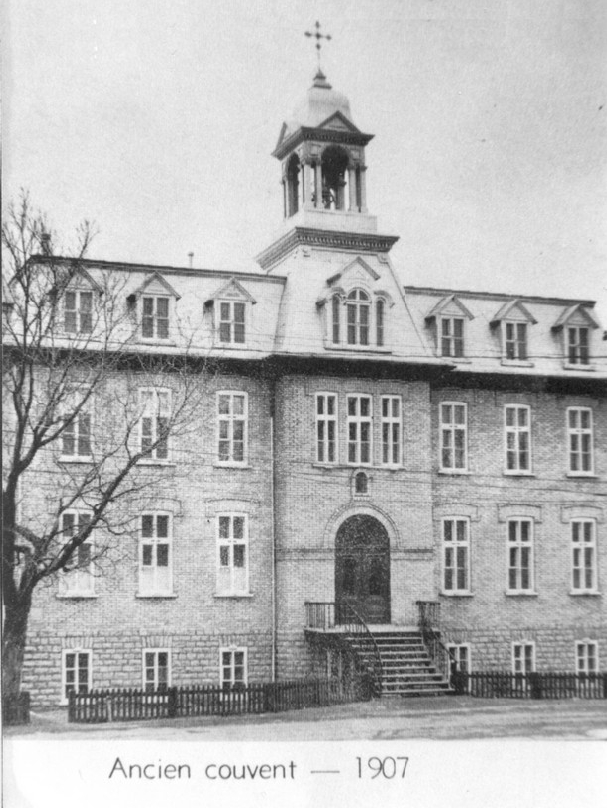
The third convent in Château-Richer

The construction of the third convent began by 1907. It included a chapel, a kitchen, a dormitory, and housing for the nuns. The new, larger building served as a school as well, but this time for boys as well as girls. Teachers were drawn from the Sisters of Our Lady of Perpetual Help, but a secular teaching staff eventually took over. In 1972, the former convent was replaced as a school by a new building, constructed nearby and housing a far greater number of students. Instead, it became a community centre. In 2002, the building was transferred to the CICB.
