= Rivière des Sept Crans =

River in La Côte-de-Beaupré Regional County Municipality, Quebec, Canada

- Location within Quebec

Location
- Country: Canada
- Province: Quebec
- Region: Capitale-Nationale
- Regional County Municipality: La Côte-de-Beaupré Regional County Municipality
- Municipality: Beaupré and Château-Richer

Physical characteristics
- Source: Confluence of two mountain streams
  - location: Beaupré
  - coordinates: 47°06′47″N 71°07′55″W
  - elevation: 520 m
- Mouth: St. Lawrence River
  - location: Beaupré
  - coordinates: 46°55′45″N 71°01′06″W
  - elevation: 265 m
- Length: 102 km (63 mi)

Basin features
- Tributaries
  - left: Five unidentified streams
  - right: Five unidentified streams

The Rivière des Sept Crans (French pronunciation: [ʁivjɛʁ de sɛt kʁɑ̃], River of the Seven Escarpments) is a tributary of the rivière aux Chiens. It flows on the north shore of the St. Lawrence River, in the unorganized territory of Lac-Jacques-Cartier, as well as the municipalities of Beaupré and Château-Richer, in the La Côte-de-Beaupré Regional County Municipality in the administrative region of Capitale-Nationale, in the province of Quebec, in Canada.

This small valley is served by the D'Auteuil road which passes on the east side of the river. Forestry is the main economic activity in this valley; second-hand tourist activities.

The surface of the Sept Crans river is generally frozen from the beginning of December until the end of March; however, safe traffic on the ice is generally from mid-December to mid-March. The water level of the river varies with the seasons and the precipitation; the spring flood occurs in March or April.

== Geography ==
The Rivière des Sept Crans rises at the confluence of two streams in the mountains behind the Côte-de-Beaupré, northwest of Mont Sainte-Anne, in the unorganized territory of Lac-Jacques-Cartier. This source is located at:

- 3.0 kilometres (1.9 mi) south-west of the source of the rivière aux Chiens;
- 3.0 kilometres (1.9 mi) southeast of the course of the Smith River;
- 2.7 kilometres (1.7 mi) east of the source of rivière du Sault à la Puce;
- 7.1 kilometres (4.4 mi) north-west of the mouth of the Sept Crans river.

From this source, the course of the Sept Crans river descends on 10.2 kilometres (6.3 mi), with a drop of 255 metres (837 ft), according to the following segments:

- 3.5 kilometres (2.2 mi) towards the south-east, collecting five streams (coming from the west), crossing a series of rapids at the end of the segment, up to the discharge (coming from the north) of a stream;
- 2.5 kilometres (1.6 mi) towards the south-east crossing two series of rapids, up to a stream (coming from the west);
- 2.1 kilometres (1.3 mi) towards the south-east, in a deep valley, crossing several series of rapids, until the confluence of the Sept Crans river (coming from the north-west);
- 2.1 kilometres (1.3 mi) towards the south-east in a deep valley, crossing three zones of rapids, until its mouth.

The Sept Crans river flows into a bend on the west bank of the Rivière aux Chiens, in Beaupré. This confluence is located 5.1 kilometres (3.2 mi) northwest of the northwest shore of the St. Lawrence River and 6.1 kilometres (3.8 mi) west of the center - town of Beaupré.

From the confluence of the Sept Crans river, the current flows over 8.3 kilometres (5.2 mi) generally southward along the course of the Rivière aux Chiens, to the northwest bank of the river Saint-Laurent.

== Toponymy ==
The origin of the name of the river refers to the seven escarpments (or rocks) that mark the relief of the banks of this river.

The toponym "Rivière des Sept Crans" was formalized on February 4, 1982 at the Place Names Bank of the Commission de toponymie du Québec.

== See also ==
- List of rivers of Quebec
