= Cazeau River =

River in La Côte-de-Beaupré Regional County Municipality, Quebec, Canada

- Location within Quebec

Location
- Country: Canada
- Province: Quebec
- Region: Capitale-Nationale
- Regional County Municipality: La Côte-de-Beaupré Regional County Municipality
- Municipality: Château-Richer

Physical characteristics
- Source: Confluence of two mountain streams
  - location: Château-Richer
  - coordinates: 47°01′49″N 71°04′10″W
  - elevation: 431 m
- Mouth: St. Lawrence River
  - location: Château-Richer
  - coordinates: 46°56′50″N 71°02′38″W
  - elevation: 4 m
- Length: 151 km (94 mi)

Basin features
- Tributaries
  - left: Five unidentified streams
  - right: (upward from the mouth) Discharge of two little lakes, four unidentified streams.

The Cazeau River flows south, on the north shore of the St. Lawrence River, in the municipality of Château-Richer, in the La Côte-de-Beaupré Regional County Municipality, in the administrative region of Capitale-Nationale, in the province of Quebec, in Canada.

The lower part of this small valley is served by avenue Royale (route 360) and route 138 which runs along the north shore of St. Lawrence River. The upper part has mountainous relief and is accessible only by secondary forest roads including Chemin Careau (coming from the north). Forestry is the main economic activity in this valley; agriculture (lower part) second.

The surface of the Cazeau River is generally frozen from the beginning of December until the end of March; however, safe traffic on the ice is generally from mid-December to mid-March. The water level of the river varies with the seasons and the precipitation; the spring flood occurs in March or April.

== Geography ==
The Cazeau River begins at the confluence of two streams in the Laurentian plateau behind the Côte-de-Beaupré, in Château-Richer. This source is located between three mountain peaks, 9.4 kilometres (5.8 mi) northeast of the mouth of the Cazeau River and 7.7 kilometres (4.8 mi) northwest of the shore northwest of the St. Lawrence River.

From this source, the course of the Cazeau river descends on 15.1 kilometres (9.4 mi), with a drop of 427 metres (1,401 ft), according to the following segments:

- 0.8 kilometres (0.50 mi) to the east in the forest zone, down the mountain, to the north shore of a small lake, corresponding to a bend in the river;
- 3.2 kilometres (2.0 mi) to the south by crossing two small unidentified lakes in a deep valley, collecting a stream (coming from the northwest), then branching to the southeast by crossing a small lake (length : 0.3 kilometres (0.19 mi); altitude: 275 metres (902 ft)), up to the dam at its mouth;
- 0.3 kilometres (0.19 mi) towards the south-east crossing on 0.23 kilometres (0.14 mi) a small unidentified lake (altitude: 272 metres (892 ft)), up to a river bend corresponding to a stream (coming from the north);
- 4.6 kilometres (2.9 mi) to the south in the forest zone by collecting a stream (coming from the west), to a bend in the river;
- 3.9 kilometres (2.4 mi) to the east in the forest zone in an increasingly deep valley going down the moraine, then bending to the south, bypassing two unidentified small lakes to the northeast, until 'to the defense of the latter;
- 0.4 kilometres (0.25 mi) towards the south-west in agricultural area, up to a bend of the river corresponds to the discharge of two streams (coming from the west);
- 1.6 kilometres (0.99 mi) to the east in an agricultural zone passing under the high-voltage wires of Hydro-Québec, crossing a deep area of the St. Lawrence plain and passing between the hamlet Rivière-Cazeau (located on the south side) and the hamlet Le Moyne (located on the north side), and passing under the railway bridge of the Canadian Pacific Railway, to route 138;
- 0.3 kilometres (0.19 mi) south-east in agricultural and resort areas to its mouth.

The Cazeau River flows into Château-Richer in a small bay on the Île d'Orléans Channel on the northwest shore of the St. Lawrence River. This bay is located between the Battures des Îlets (located on the south side) and the Le Moyne River (located on the north side). This bay faces Île d'Orléans which is 2.3 kilometres (1.4 mi) to the east. This confluence is located 4.7 kilometres (2.9 mi) north of the village center of L'Ange-Gardien, 3.0 kilometres (1.9 mi) south of the village center of Château-Richer and 9.8 kilometres (6.1 mi) north of the bridge connecting the Île d'Orléans to L'Ange-Gardier.

== Toponymy ==
Known since 1851, this toponym evokes the memory of Jean Cassaux (around 1699-1761), surgeon, originally from the town of Issor in Béarn, in France. He acquired a first lot of land in 1724 in this parish. The spelling of his patronym used in the name of the river will subsequently include the letter z notably in an act of land concession in 1750. Later, the spelling Cazeau will identify a station of the "P'tit train de Sainte-Anne" fitted out by the Quebec Railway Light and Power company which operated this railway serving the Côte de Beaupré. Nowadays, the hamlet of Rivière-Cazeau is located near this old train station.

The toponym "Rivière Cazeau" was formalized on December 5, 1968 at the Place Names Bank of the Commission de toponymie du Québec.

== See also ==
- La Côte-de-Beaupré Regional County Municipality
- Château-Richer
- St. Lawrence River
- List of rivers of Quebec
- Île d'Orléans Channel
- Capitale-Nationale
