= Chenal de l'Île d'Orléans =

Channel in La Côte-de-Beaupré Regional County Municipality, Quebec, Canada

Chenal de l'Île d'Orléans Old names: "Chenal Nord" and "Chenal Orléans"
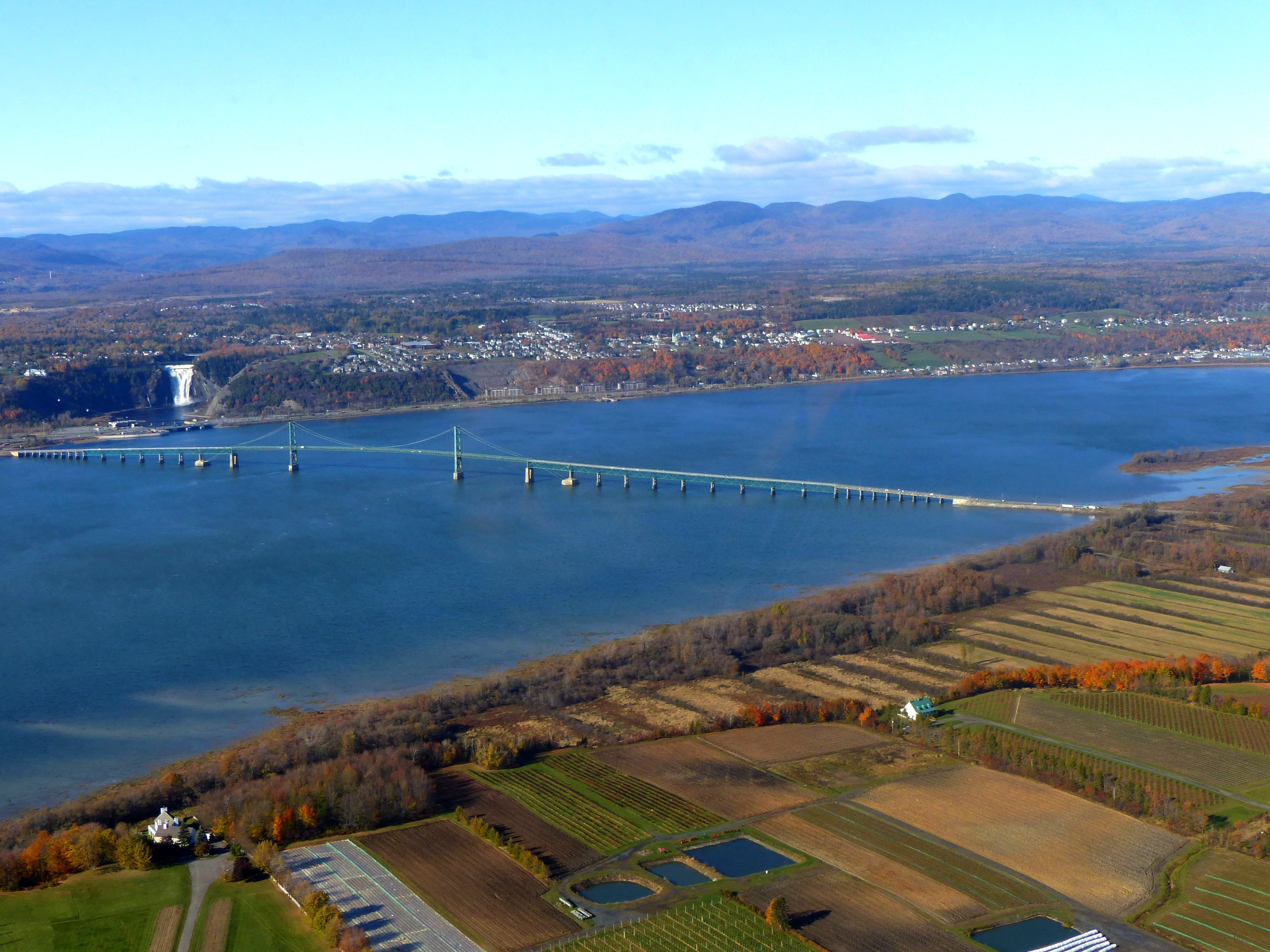

- Location within Quebec

Location
- Country: Canada
- Province: Quebec
- Region: Capitale-Nationale
- Regional County Municipality: La Côte-de-Beaupré Regional County Municipality
- Municipality: Beaupré and Château-Richer

Physical characteristics
- Source: St. Lawrence River
  - location: Quebec (city)
  - coordinates: 49°17′55″N 70°58′49″W
  - elevation: 4 m
- Mouth: St. Lawrence River
  - location: Beaupré
  - coordinates: 47°00′26″N 70°57′37″W
  - elevation: 4 m
- Length: 33.1 km (20.6 mi)

Basin features
- Tributaries
  - left: (upward from the mouth) Sainte-Anne River (Beaupré), Rivière aux Chiens (Côte-de-Beaupré), Lefrançois stream, Côté stream, Cous d'eau Thivierge, Turgeon stream, rivière du Sault à la Puce, Prémont stream, Le Moyne River, Cazeau River, Valin River (La Côte-de-Beaupré), rivière du Petit Pré, Montmorency River.
  - right: (upward from the mouth) Ruisseau du Moulin, series of unidentified streams, La Décharge, Pot au Beurre river, Moulin river, La Petite Rivière, La Grande Rivière, unidentified stream.

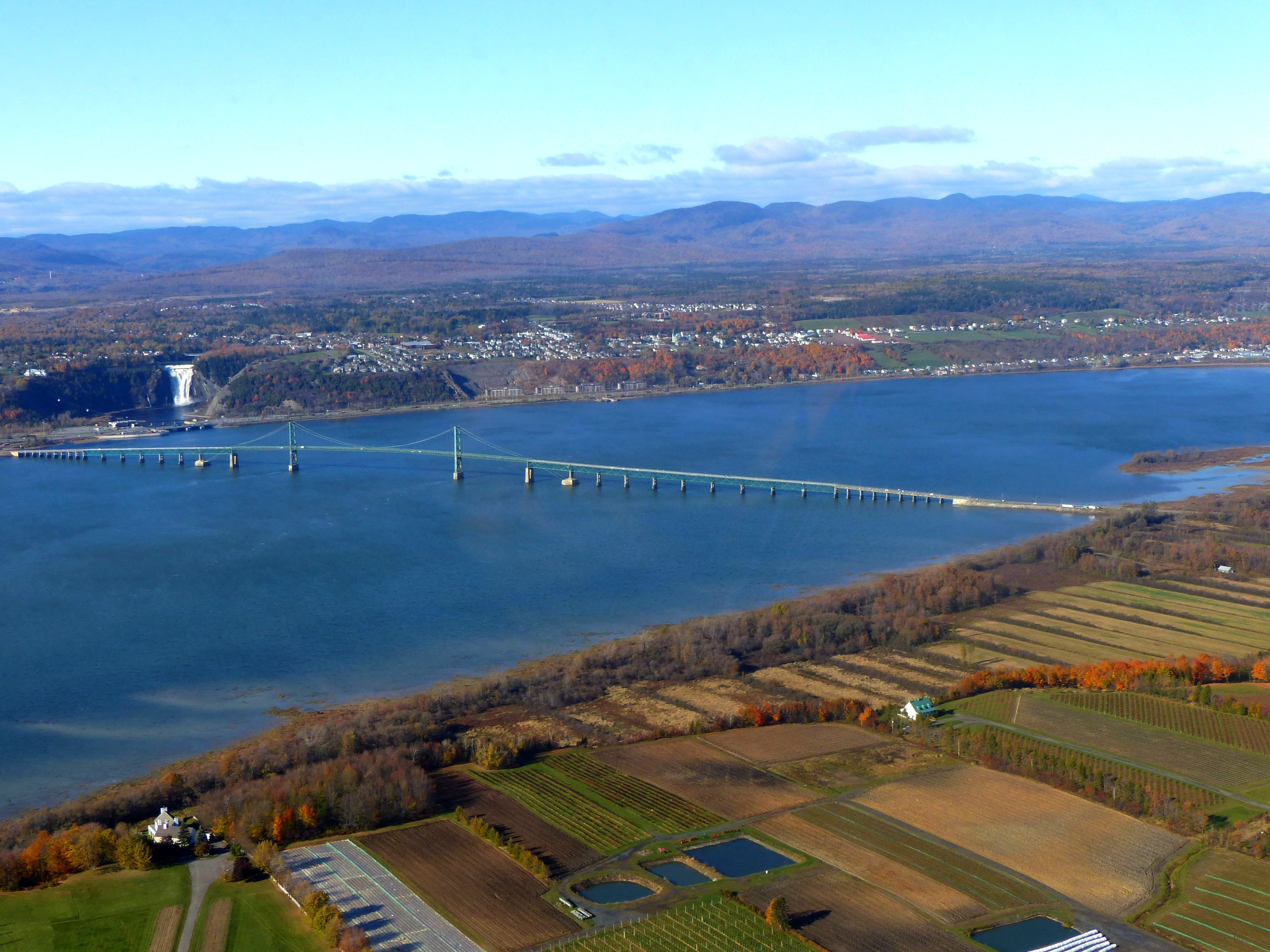
Île d'Orléans Bridge, Quebec City

The chenal de l'Île d'Orléans (French pronunciation: [ʃənal də lil dɔʁleɑ̃], Orléans Island Channel) is a channel of the St. Lawrence River, flowing in the administrative region of Capitale-Nationale, in the province of Quebec, in Canada.

This channel is formed by the Île d'Orléans (length: 33.1 kilometres (20.6 mi); width: 8.3 kilometres (5.2 mi)) which is bound to the southeast by the St. Lawrence River and to the northeast by the channel of Île d'Orléans.

The surface of the Île d'Orléans channel is generally frozen from mid-December to the end of March.

The main access roads are route 138 which runs along the north shore of the St. Lawrence River and Chemin Royal which runs along the northwest shore of Île d'Orléans.

== Geography ==
The Île d'Orléans channel begins opposite the crossroads where the Dufferin-Montmorency Expressway and the Félix-Leclerc Expressway meet, on the northwest shore of the St. Lawrence River. Opposite, the municipality of Sainte-Pétronille administers the southwestern tip of Île d'Orléans.

The width of the entrance to the channel measures 2.1 kilometres (1.3 mi).

The course of the Île d'Orléans channel passes under the Île d'Orléans bridge.

The mouth of the Île d'Orléans channel, which merges with the St. Lawrence River, is located at Pointe aux Prêtres (north-west bank of the river) and Pointe Argentenay (north end of Île d'Orléans). The center of this confluence is located at:

- 6.5 kilometres (4.0 mi) North-east of the mouth of the Sainte-Anne River (Beaupré);
- 12.3 kilometres (7.6 mi) northwest of the southeast shore of the St. Lawrence River;
- 30.6 kilometres (19.0 mi) North-east of the bridge connecting the Île d'Orléans to L'Ange-Gardien;
- 40.1 kilometres (24.9 mi) Southeast of downtown Quebec (city).

The width of the mouth of the channel is 2.8 kilometres (1.7 mi).

== History ==
The toponym "Chenal de l'Île d'Orléans" was formalized on December 5, 1968 at the Commission de toponymie du Québec, that is when it was created.

== See also ==
- Capitale-Nationale
- La Côte-de-Beaupré Regional County Municipality
- Île d'Orléans
- St. Lawrence River
- List of Quebec channels
- List of rivers of Quebec
