= Rivière du Petit Pré =

River in La Côte-de-Beaupré Regional County Municipality, Canada

- Location within Quebec

Location
- Country: Canada
- Province: Quebec
- Region: Capitale-Nationale
- Regional County Municipality: La Côte-de-Beaupré Regional County Municipality
- Municipality: L'Ange-Gardien

Physical characteristics
- Source: Lac la Retenue
  - location: L'Ange-Gardien
  - coordinates: 46°58′02″N 71°07′55″W
  - elevation: 197 m
- Mouth: St. Lawrence River
  - location: L'Ange-Gardien
  - coordinates: 46°55′45″N 71°03′29″W
  - elevation: 4 m
- Length: 102 km (63 mi)

Basin features
- Tributaries
  - left: (Upward from the mouth) Three unidentified streams, rivière la Reine
  - right: Five unidentified streams

The Rivière du Petit Pré flows south, on the north shore of the St. Lawrence River, entirely in the municipality of L'Ange-Gardien, in the (MRC) of La Côte-de-Beaupré Regional County Municipality, in the administrative region of Capitale-Nationale, in province of Quebec, in Canada.

The lower part of this small valley is served by Avenue Royale and the route 138 which runs along the north shore of the St. Lawrence River. The upper part is accessible by the Lucien-Lefrançois road. Forestry, in particular the exploitation of sugar factories, constitutes the main economic activity in this valley; agriculture (lower part) second.

The surface of the Petit Pré river is generally frozen from the beginning of December until the end of March; however, safe traffic on the ice is generally from mid-December to mid-March. The water level of the river varies with the seasons and the precipitation; the spring flood occurs in March or April.

== Geography ==
The Petit Pré river originates in Lake La Retenue in the hinterland of Côte-de-Beaupré; a dam is built at its mouth. This lake has two outlets: the Petit Pré river and the outlet of the rivière la Retenue which turns out to be a tributary of the Ferrée River.

From Lac la Retenue, the course of the Petit Pré river descends on 10.2 kilometres (6.3 mi), with a drop of 193 metres (633 ft), according to the following segments:

- 1.9 kilometres (1.2 mi) towards the south-east crossing an agricultural zone and a small hamlet, until the confluence of the Queen river (coming from the north);
- 2.8 kilometres (1.7 mi) generally in the forest area south to a bend in the river, then east, crossing a small unidentified lake (length: 0.4 kilometres (0.25 mi); altitude: 144 metres (472 ft), up to the dam at its mouth;
- 5.1 kilometres (3.2 mi) first towards the north-east in the forest zone up to the high-voltage lines of Hydro-Québec, where the agricultural zone begins, forming some small coils, then towards the is by forming some streamers, crossing the hamlet Petit Pré, up to route 138;
- 0.42 kilometres (0.26 mi) towards the south-east, passing on the south side of the village Giguère and crossing a bay with a length of 0.39 kilometres (0.24 mi), up to its mouth.

The Petit Pré river flows on the northwest bank of the Saint-Laurent river, in the area designated "La Longue Pointe", opposite the Pointe Saint-Pierre of Île d'Orléans. This mouth is located between the hamlet Valin (located on the north side) and the hamlet Petit-Pré (located on the south side). This confluence is located 2.6 kilometres (1.6 mi) north of the village center of L'Ange-Gardien, 0.9 kilometres (0.56 mi) of the northwest shore of Île d'Orléans and 7.8 kilometres (4.8 mi) north of the bridge linking Île d'Orléans to L'Ange-Gardien. The segment of 0.8 kilometres (0.50 mi) upward from the mouth, constitutes the limit of the municipalities of L'Ange-Gardien and Château-Richer.

== Toponymy ==
This toponym has a descriptive origin, because natural meadows supplying shore hay generally encouraged the formation of the first stands on the Côte-de-Beaupré. At the beginning of the 20th century, thanks to the arrival of the railway, the agglomeration formed around the railway station which has disappeared today characterized the establishment of the current hamlet.

This watercourse, identified in 1652 as "Rivière du Petit-Pré", has also been designated otherwise. In the 17th century, this watercourse was designated "Lothainville", sometimes spelled "Lotinville"; this designation evokes that in 1652 this watercourse crossed a stretch of land behind the fiefdom under the name of Lotinville or Lothainville, in memory of Isabelle Lotin, mother of the governor of Lauson. In the 20th century, part of the local population also designated this watercourse: "Rivière du Moulin" and "Rivière à Richard".

The toponym "Rivière du Petit Pré" was formalized on December 5, 1968 at the Place Names Bank of the Commission de toponymie du Québec.

== See also ==
- Chenal de l'Île d'Orléans
- L'Ange-Gardien, a municipality
- La Côte-de-Beaupré Regional County Municipality
- Capitale-Nationale, an administrative region
- St. Lawrence River
- List of rivers of Quebec
