= Rivière la Retenue =

Rivère la Retenue
- Location within Quebec
- Native name: Rivière Laval (French)

Location
- Country: Canada
- Province: Quebec
- Region: Capitale-Nationale
- Regional County Municipality: La Côte-de-Beaupré Regional County Municipality
- Municipality: Château-Richer, L'Ange-Gardien

Physical characteristics
- Source: Unidentified lake
  - location: Château-Richer
  - coordinates: 47°02′13″N 71°05′51″W
  - elevation: 568 m
- Mouth: Ferrée River
  - location: L'Ange-Gardien
  - coordinates: 46°58′16″N 71°07′31″W
  - elevation: 190 m
- Length: 138 km (86 mi)

Basin features
- Tributaries
  - left: (Upward from the mouth) Unidentified stream, discharge from an unidentified small lake, discharge from four unidentified small lakes.
  - right: (Upward from the mouth) Bras du Nord-Ouest (Northwest Arm), unidentified stream, discharge from an unidentified lake.

The rivière la Retenue (English: Retained River) is a tributary of the east bank of the Ferrée river. It flows in the municipalities of Château-Richer and L'Ange-Gardien, in the La Côte-de-Beaupré Regional County Municipality, in the administrative region of Capitale-Nationale, in the province of Quebec, in Canada.

The lower part of this valley is served by roads around Lac la Retenue. The intermediate part which follows the foot of the big mountain, is served by a forest road for the needs of forestry and the maintenance of high-voltage lines of Hydro-Quebec. The upper part, which is difficult to access because of the mountainous terrain, is served by a forest road from the north. Forestry is the main economic activity in this valley; second, recreational tourism.

The surface of the Retained River is generally frozen from the beginning of December until the end of March; however, safe traffic on the ice is generally from mid-December to mid-March. The upper part of the river is subject to a frost period of about a week more due to the altitude. The water level of the river varies with the seasons and the precipitation; the spring flood occurs in March or April.

== Geography ==
The Retained River originates from a small forest lake (length: 0.5 kilometres (0.31 mi); altitude: 568 metres (1,864 ft)). This source is located in a cuvée between three mountain peaks (686 m to the north, 684 m to the northeast, 688 m to the southeast and 679 m to the southwest) in the municipality of Château-Richer, at:

- 4.3 kilometres (2.7 mi) east of a curve of the Montmorency river;
- 8.9 kilometres (5.5 mi) north of the confluence of the Retained river and the Ferrée river;
- 9.7 kilometres (6.0 mi) north-west of the north-west bank of the Saint-Laurent river.

From its source, the Retained River descends on 13.8 kilometres (8.6 mi), with a drop of 378 metres (1,240 ft) according to the following segments:

- 1.0 kilometre (0.62 mi) south in Château-Richer, with a drop of 78 metres (256 ft), to a stream (coming from the north);
- 2.0 kilometres (1.2 mi) to the south, collecting the discharge (coming from the northeast) of a small lake, to the discharge (coming from the southwest) of a dam lake;
- 4.0 kilometres (2.5 mi) with a drop of 120 metres (390 ft) first south-east to a bend in the river, then south-west to a stream (coming from the northeast). Note: This segment of river bypasses a mountain whose summit reaches 479 metres (1,572 ft);
- 2.9 kilometres (1.8 mi) towards the south by forming a large S, then curving towards the west, up to the outlet (coming from the north) of an unidentified lake;
- 2.4 kilometres (1.5 mi) first towards the west until a 160 degree bend in the river, then towards the south by forming a curve towards the east, then towards the southwest by crossing the Lac la Retenue (length: 0.7 kilometres (0.43 mi); altitude: 197 metres (646 ft)), to the dam at its mouth. Note: Lac la Retenue receives the waters of the North-West Arm which pours into the bottom of an L-shaped bay with a length of 0.3 kilometres (0.19 mi);
- 1.5 kilometres (0.93 mi) first towards the south by crossing the road?, then by forming a hook towards the west by forming two loops oriented towards the northeast, until its mouth.

The Retained river flows on the north bank of the Ferrée River into a forest area.

From the confluence of the Retained river, the current flows on 11.5 kilometres (7.1 mi) generally towards the south following the course of the Ferrée River; then on 3.2 kilometres (2.0 mi) towards the east by the course of the Montmorency river, to the northwest shore of the Saint-Laurent river.

== Toponymy ==
This river was formerly designated "Laval River". This toponymic designation is linked to "Lac la Retenue" which has a dam at its mouth.

The toponym "Rivière la Retenue" was formalized on December 13, 1996 at the Commission de toponymie du Québec.

== Appendices ==
- La Côte-de-Beaupré Regional County Municipality
- Château-Richer, a municipality
- L'Ange-Gardien, Capitale-Nationale, Quebec, a municipality
- Ferrée River
- Montmorency River
- List of rivers of Quebec

=== Bibliography ===
- Charlevoix-Montmorency watershed organization (2015). Charlevoix-Montmorency water master plan (PDF). pp. 75, 907. Archived from the original (PDF) on 2016-11-25.
