= Château-Richer =

- City
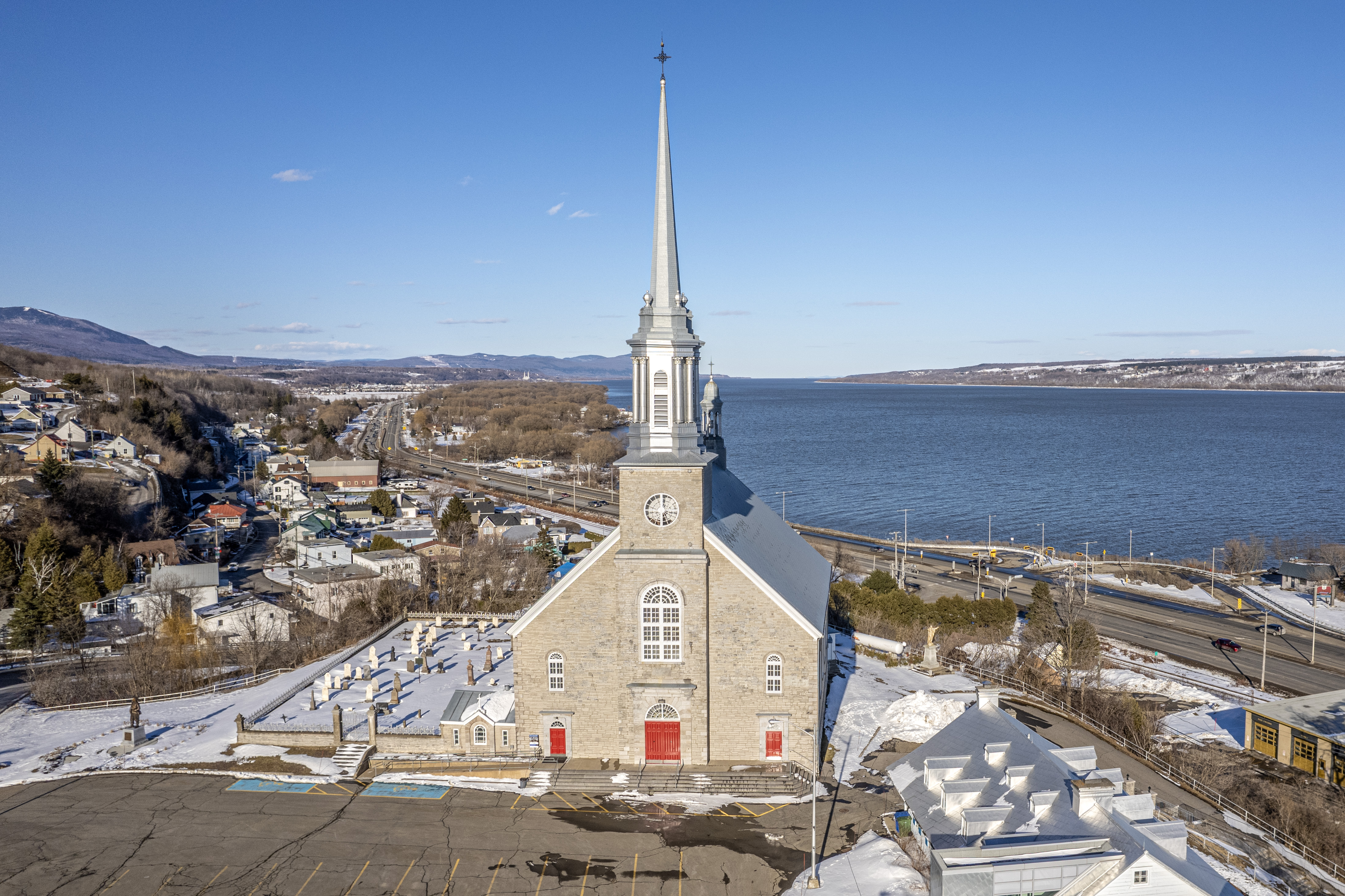
- La Visitation-de-Notre-Dame
- Motto: Union et Paix
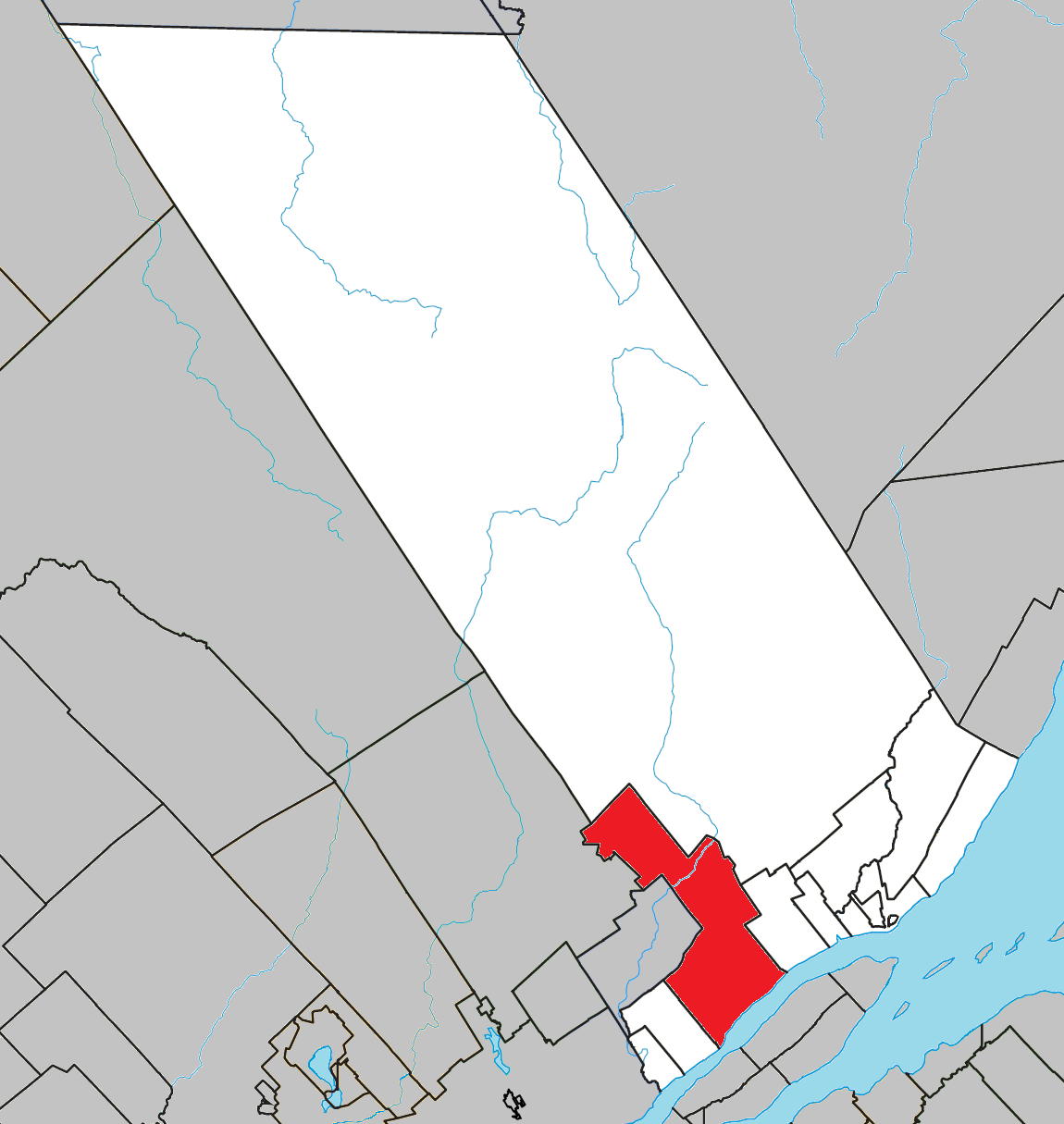
- Location within La Côte-de-Beaupré RCM

- Location in central Quebec
- Coordinates: 46°58′N 71°01′W
- Country: Canada
- Province: Quebec
- Region: Capitale-Nationale
- RCM: La Côte-de-Beaupré
- Constituted: July 1, 1855

Government
  - Mayor: Gino Pouliot
  - Fed. riding: Montmorency—Charlevoix
  - Prov. riding: Charlevoix–Côte-de-Beaupré

Area
  - Total: 139.51 km^{2} (53.87 sq mi)
  - Land: 126.6 km^{2} (48.9 sq mi)

Population (2021)
  - Total: 4,425
  - Density: 19.3/km^{2} (50/sq mi)
  - Pop (2016-21): ▲7.2%
  - Dwellings: 2,064
- Time zone: UTC−5 (EST)
  - Summer (DST): UTC−4 (EDT)
- Postal code(s): G0A
- Area codes: 418 and 581
- Highways: R-138 R-360
- Website: www.chateauricher.qc.ca

Château-Richer (French pronunciation: [ʃato ʁiʃe]) is a small town situated in the Capitale-Nationale region of Quebec, Canada. Located on the north shore of the Saint Lawrence River east of Quebec City. It is the seat for the Côte-de-Beaupré Regional County Municipality.

The first rural parish in New France was established in 1678, by the members of La Compagnie-des-Cents-Associés. Château-Richer was the first home to Quebec's oldest families (les Greniers, Giroux, Vachons, Bélangers, Juchereaux, Cloutiers) with descendants remaining to this day. In fact, a fairly large segment of the town's population can be traced back to those enterprising pioneers tasked with establishing a fur-trading post while increasing the population.

The town stretches for several miles alongside Route 138. This road, originally known as Le Chemin du Roy (The King’s Road) or Le Chemin-Royal (The Royal Road), would later be renamed l’Avenue Royale . It is among the first roads to be built in North America.

In addition to the main namesake population centre, the municipality also includes the hamlets of Le Moyne (46°57′20″N 71°2′42″W), Rivière-Cazeau (46°56′56″N 71°3′0″W), Sault-à-la-Puce (46°58′39″N 71°0′36″W), Saint-Achillée (47°3′4″N 71°1′42″W), and Saint-Ignace (47°2′7″N 71°3′3″W).

== History ==
In 1626, Samuel de Champlain established in Château-Richer the first farm in the Saint Lawrence valley, to feed the people of Quebec city. Jean Bourdon's map of 1641 is the earliest source that mentions the name "Chateau Richer", referring only to the cape or headland on which stands the present church. But the origin of this name remains uncertain. In 1646, Olivier Letardif, Lord and Chief Prosecutor, granted 20 concessions to the inhabitants of Château-Richer so that they could officially establish themselves properly.

In 1678, the local parish was formed, named La Visitation-de-Notre-Dame. On March 15, 1753, Château-Richer became very first organized village in New France. In 1832, the post office opened. In 1845, the municipality was first established but abolished in 1847. It was reestablished in 1855 when it was incorporated as a parish municipality. Château-Richer was the county town of defunct Montmorency County.

In 1968, it changed its status to "town" and became Ville de Château-Richer.

In 1971, a part of Château-Richer was dissolved and returned to unorganized.

== Demographics ==
In the 2021 Census of Population conducted by Statistics Canada, Château-Richer had a population of 4,425 living in 1,918 of its 2,064 total private dwellings, a change of 7.2% from its 2016 population of 4,126. With a land area of 228.84 km^{2} (88.36 sq mi), it had a population density of 19.3/km^{2} (50.1/sq mi) in 2021.

Historical census populations – Château-Richer, Quebec

Year	Pop.	±%
1871	1,618	—
1881	1,820	+12.5%
1891	1,587	−12.8%
1901	1,595	+0.5%
1911	1,773	+11.2%
1921	1,857	+4.7%
1931	2,250	+21.2%
1941	2,348	+4.4%

Year	Pop.	±%
1951	2,787	+18.7%
1956	2,947	+5.7%
1961	3,113	+5.6%
1966	3,118	+0.2%
1971	3,111	−0.2%
1976	3,075	−1.2%
1981	3,628	+18.0%
1986	3,802	+4.8%

Year	Pop.	±%
1991	3,690	−2.9%
1996	3,579	−3.0%
2001	3,442	−3.8%
2006	3,563	+3.5%
2011	3,834	+7.6%
2016	4,126	+7.6%
2021	4,425	+7.2%

Population counts are not adjusted for boundary changes.
Source: Statistics Canada

Mother tongue (2021):

- English as first language: 0.8%
- French as first language: 97.7%
- English and French as first language: 0.7%
- Other as first language: 0.7%

== Government ==
List of former mayors:

- Lemoine, H.: 1845–1848
- Huot, Michel: 1849–1851
- Renaud, Jean: 1852–1854
- Rheaume, Charles: 1855–1857
- Bernier, L.P.: 1858–1859
- Gravel, Alexandre: 1860–1871
- Cloutier, Vincent: 1872–1873
- Tremblay, Onésime: 1874–1875
- Cauchon, Pierre: 1876–1876
- Cloutier, Edouard: 1877–1885
- Gravel, Louis-Nérée: 1886–1887
- Premont, Joseph: 1888–1888
- Cloutier, Joseph. P.: 1889–1890
- Gariepy, Edouard: 1890–1891
- Simard, Etienne Romain: 1891–1891
- Cote, François: 1882–1892
- Laplante, François Xavier: 1883–1895
- Cloutier, Nazaire: 1896–1899
- Dick, Herménégilde: 1900–1900
- Lefrancois, Amédée: 1901–1901
- Jobidon, Julien: 1902–1902
- Cloutier, Joseph: 1903–1916
- Cloutier, Emile: 1917–1920
- Cloutier, Joseph: 1921–1924
- Lefrancois, Jules A.: 1925–1931
- Jobidon, Hilaire: 1931–1933
- Gravel, Edouard Lazare: 1933–1935
- Jobidon, Pierre: 1935–1937
- Cauchon, Léonidas: 1937–1939
- Rheaume, Lucien: 1939–1959
- Gagnon, Philippe: 1959–1965
- Laplante, Omer: 1965–1967
- Bolduc, Jean-Guy: 1967–1973
- Premont, Paul-Emile: 1973–1977
- Bolduc, Jean-Guy: 1977–1978
- Verreault, Noël: 1978–1985
- Laplante, Léo: 1985–1993
- Cloutier, Jean-Guy: 1993–2005
- Dancause, Frédéric: 2005–2017
- Robitaille, Jean: 2017–2021
- Pouliot, Gino: 2021–present

== Notable people ==
- Louis-Théodore Besserer, a prominent businessman of Ottawa, was born in Château-Richer.

== See also ==
- Centre d'Interprétation de la Côte-de-Beaupré
- Rivers flowing through Château-Richer
  - Cazeau River
  - Chenal de l'Île d'Orléans
  - Rivière aux Chiens (Côte-de-Beaupré)
  - Rivière la Retenue
  - Rivière du Sault à la Puce
- List of cities in Quebec
