= Ferrée River (Montmorency River tributary) =

River in La Côte-de-Beaupré Regional County Municipality, Canada

Ferrée River (French) Old name: "Rivière Laval" (French)
- Location within Quebec

Location
- Country: Canada
- Province: Quebec
- Region: Capitale-Nationale
- Regional County Municipality: La Côte-de-Beaupré Regional County Municipality
- Municipality: L'Ange-Gardien, Boischatel

Physical characteristics
- Source: Mountain stream
  - location: L'Ange-Gardien
  - coordinates: 46°57′22″N 71°10′31″W
  - elevation: 339 m
- Mouth: Montmorency River
  - location: Boischatel
  - coordinates: 46°54′05″N 71°10′10″W
  - elevation: 117 m
- Length: 175 km (109 mi)

Basin features
- Tributaries
  - left: (Upward from the mouth) rivière la Retenue and six streams.
  - right: Four streams

The Ferrée river is a tributary on the east bank of the Montmorency River. It flows in the municipalities of L'Ange-Gardien and Boischatel, in the La Côte-de-Beaupré Regional County Municipality, in the administrative region of Capitale-Nationale, in the province of Quebec, in Canada.

The upper part of this valley is served by Chemin des Sucreries, by Chemin du Nord-de-la-Ligne Hydro and by a few forest roads. Forestry, in particular the exploitation of sugar factories, constitutes the main economic activity in this valley; second, recreational tourism. While the lower part crosses the northern sector of the urban part of Boischatel.

The surface of the Ferrée river is generally frozen from the beginning of December until the end of March; however, safe traffic on the ice is generally from mid-December to mid-March. The water level of the river varies with the seasons and the precipitation; the spring flood occurs in March or April.

== Geography ==
The Ferrée river originates from a forest stream (altitude: 339 metres (1,112 ft)). This source is located in the heart of a mountain with three peaks (379 m, 385 m and 398 m) in the municipality of L'Ange-Gardien, at:

- 1.6 kilometres (0.99 mi) north-east of the Montmorency River;
- 6.4 kilometres (4.0 mi) north-west of the confluence of the Ferrée river and the Montmorency River;
- 7.6 kilometres (4.7 mi) north-west of the north-west bank of the St. Lawrence River.

From its source, the Ferrée river descends on 17.5 kilometres (10.9 mi), with a drop of 222 metres (728 ft) according to the following segments:

Upper part of the Ferrée river (segment of 6.0 kilometres (3.7 mi))

- 2.2 kilometres (1.4 mi) north in L'Ange-Gardien, in a deep valley, to a bend in the river, corresponding to two streams, one of which comes from the southwest and the other North;
- 3.8 kilometres (2.4 mi) in forest territory to the east in a deep valley up to a bend in the river, then south-east, to the confluence of the Rivière la Retenue ( coming from the northeast);

Lower part of the Ferrée river (segment of 11.5 kilometres (7.1 mi))

- 3.4 kilometres (2.1 mi) to the south in a plain in forest territory by first forming a loop to the east, collecting a stream (coming from the west), crossing the Chemin du Pont- à-Mathias, successively forming a loop towards the east and another towards the west, up to a stream (coming from the northwest);
- 2.1 kilometres (1.3 mi) to the south by forming two loops to the east, up to the Boischatel limit corresponding to a stream (coming from the west);
- 3.3 kilometres (2.1 mi) in Boischatel, first towards the south in the forest zone by forming a loop straddling the inter-municipal limit between L'Ange-Gardien and Boischatel, and bypassing the northern part on the East side from the urban area of Boischatel, then south-west across a small artificial lake, to the dam at its mouth;
- 2.1 kilometres (1.3 mi) to the southwest by crossing rue des Rochers, then forming three loops to the southeast by crossing the Royal Québec golf course to the bridge on rue Notre-Dame;
- 0.6 kilometres (0.37 mi) west in a small S, to its mouth.

The Ferrée river flows on the northeast bank of the Montmorency river, opposite the hamlet "Les Roches-Plates" located on the southwest bank.

From the confluence of the Ferrée river, the current flows over 3.2 kilometres (2.0 mi) generally towards the southeast by the course of the Montmorency River, up to the northwest bank of the St. Lawrence River.

The Ferrée river has the particularity of having an underground section on 800 metres (2,600 ft). These losses feed the Boischatel cave. During major floods, the section between the losses of the Ferrée River and the Montmorency river can flow in the open air.

== Toponymy ==
This river was formerly designated "Rivière Laval" and "Rivière Ferry".

The toponym "Rivière Ferrée" was formalized on August 14, 1997, at the Commission de toponymie du Québec.

== Appendices ==
=== Related articles ===
- Boischatel Cave
- La Côte-de-Beaupré Regional County Municipality
- L'Ange-Gardien, Quebec, a municipality
- Boischatel, a municipality
- Rivière la Retenue
- Montmorency River
- List of rivers of Quebec

=== Bibliography ===
- Charlevoix-Montmorency watershed organization (2015). Charlevoix-Montmorency water master plan (PDF). p. 75. Archived from the original (PDF) on 2016-11-25.
