= Quebec Route 360 =

Highway in Quebec, Canada

Route 360

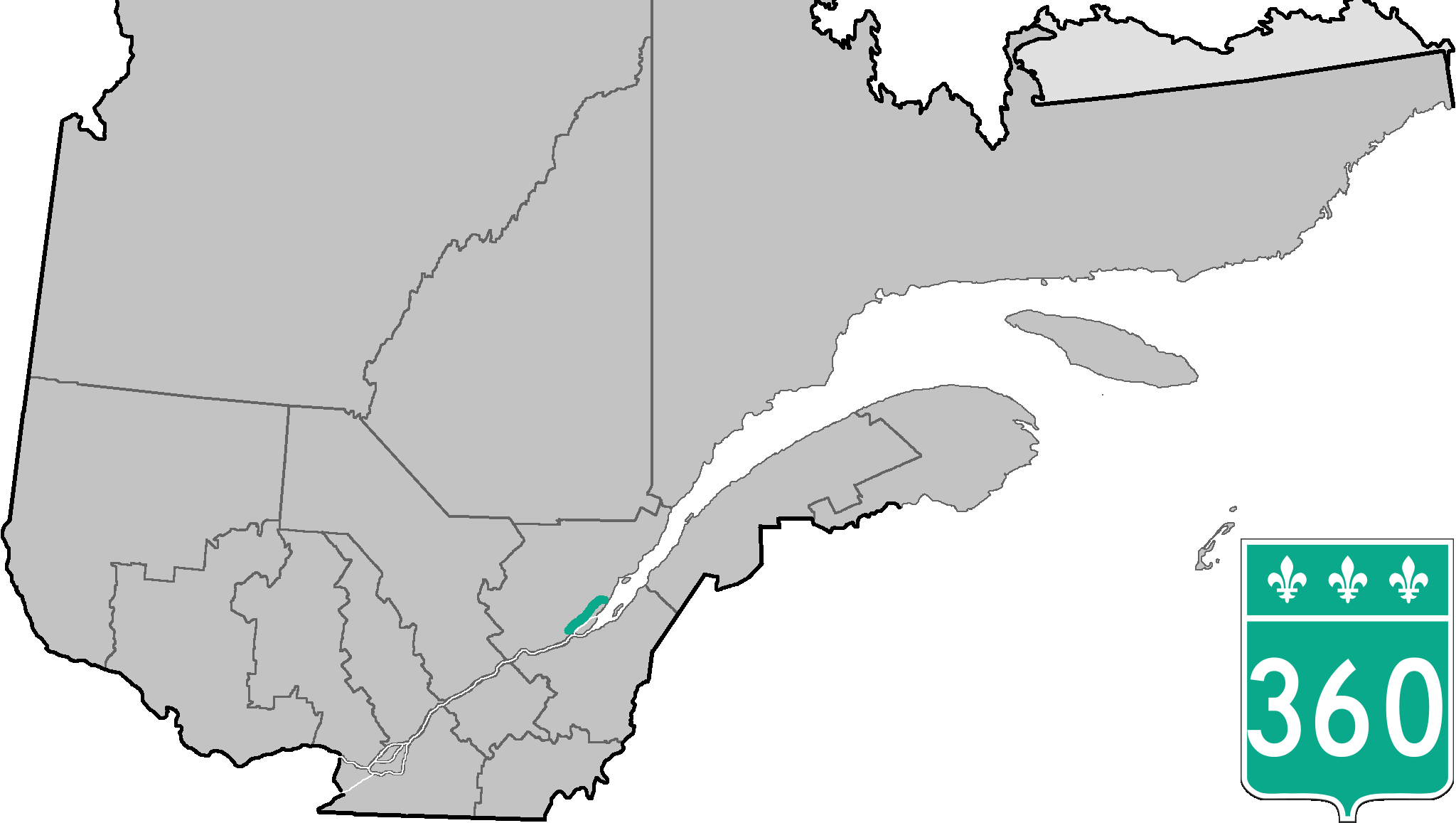

Route information
- Maintained by Transports Québec
- Length: 1 km (0.62 mi)

Major junctions
- West end: R-138 in Quebec City
- A-40 in Quebec City; R-138 in Beaupre
- East end: R-138 in Saint-Tite-des-Caps

Location
- Country: Canada
- Province: Quebec
- Major cities: Quebec City

Highway system
- Quebec provincial highways; Autoroutes; List; Former
← R-359	→ R-361

Route 360 is a provincial highway located in the Capitale-Nationale region in the south central part of the province of Quebec. The highway runs from Quebec City's Beauport sector and ends at the junction of Route 138 northeast of Saint-Tite-des-Caps in the Charlevoix region. For a large portion of its length it runs right beside Route 138, overlapping it briefly near Beaupré. The road also travels through significant portions of the Charlevoix touristic area and also crosses Mont-Sainte-Anne ski resort and the Montmorency Falls located at the Montmorency River which connects the Saint Lawrence River nearby.

== Towns along Route 360 ==
- Quebec City (including the Beauport sector)
- Boischatel
- L'Ange-Gardien
- Château-Richer
- Sainte-Anne-de-Beaupré
- Beaupré
- Saint-Férréol-des-Neiges
- Saint-Tite-des-Caps

== See also ==
- List of Quebec provincial highways
