= L'Ange-Gardien, Capitale-Nationale =

L'Ange-Gardien
- Municipality
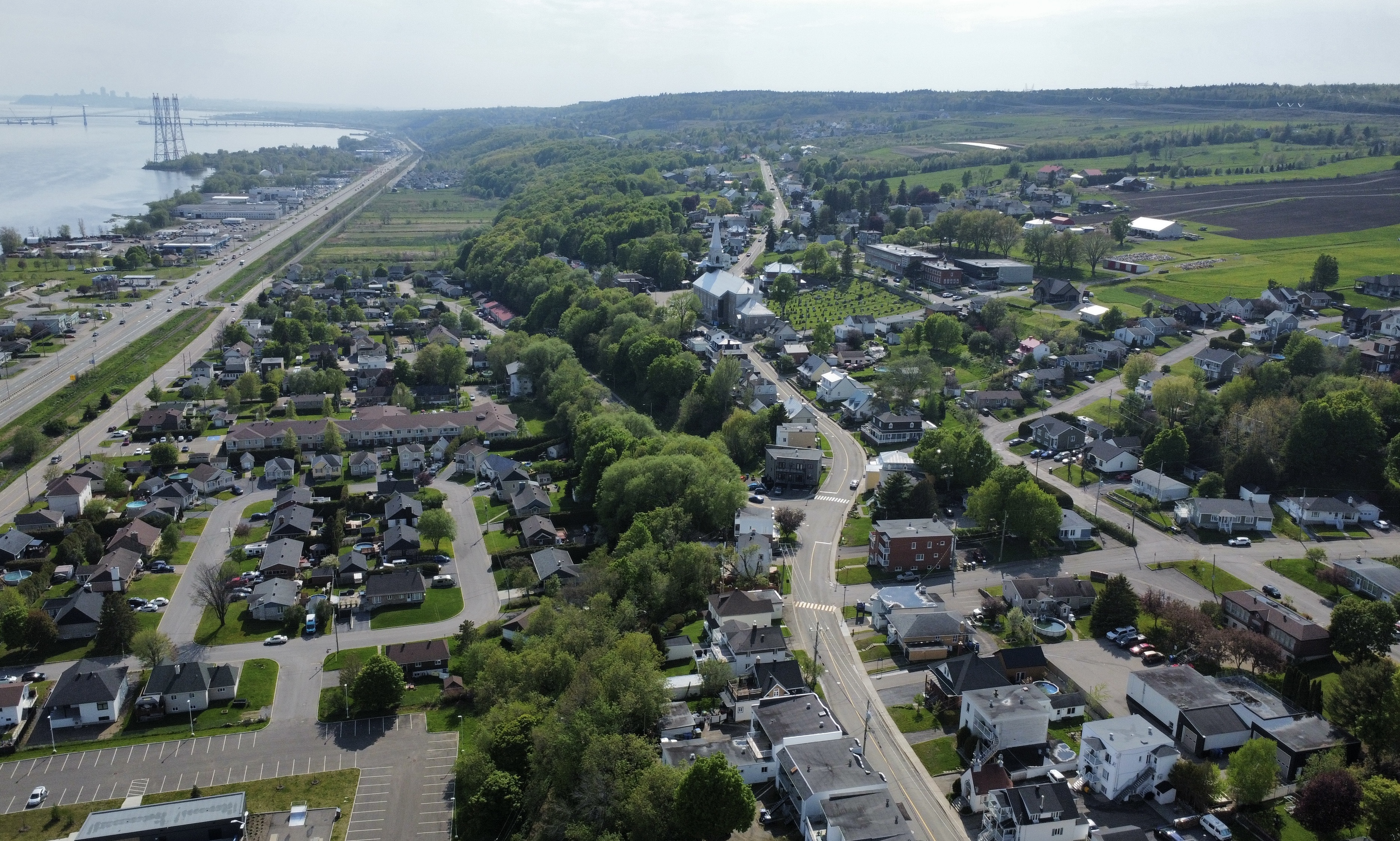
- Aerial view of L’Ange-Gardien

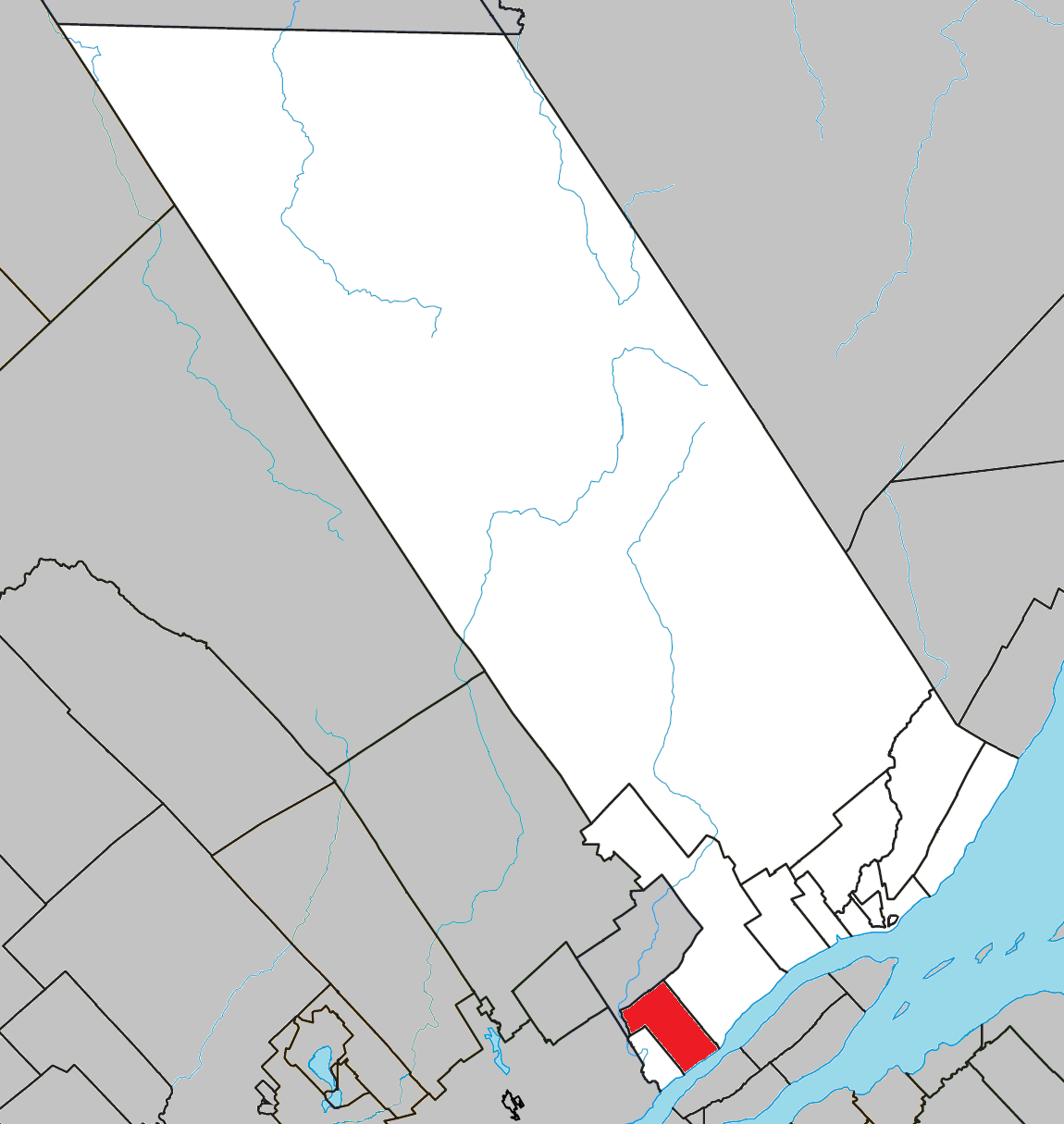
- Location within La Côte-de-Beaupré RCM

- Location in central Quebec
- Coordinates: 46°55′N 71°06′W
- Country: Canada
- Province: Quebec
- Region: Capitale-Nationale
- RCM: La Côte-de-Beaupré
- Constituted: July 1, 1855

Government
  - Mayor: Pierre Lefrançois
  - Fed. riding: Montmorency—Charlevoix
  - Prov. riding: Charlevoix–Côte-de-Beaupré

Area
  - Total: 53.59 km^{2} (20.69 sq mi)
  - Land: 53.61 km^{2} (20.70 sq mi)
- There is an apparent discrepancy between 2 authoritative sources.

Population (2021)
  - Total: 3,842
  - Density: 71.7/km^{2} (186/sq mi)
  - Pop (2016–21): ▲4.0%
  - Dwellings: 1,717
- Time zone: UTC−5 (EST)
  - Summer (DST): UTC−4 (EDT)
- Postal code(s): G0A 2K0
- Area codes: 418 and 581
- Highways: R-138 R-360
- Website: www.langegardien.qc.ca

L'Ange-Gardien (French pronunciation: [lɑ̃ʒ ɡaʁdjɛ̃]) is a municipality in the Capitale-Nationale region of Quebec, Canada. It is part of La Côte-de-Beaupré Regional County Municipality.

== History ==
First settled by French colonists around 1633, the Parish of Saints-Anges-Gardiens (French for "holy guardian angels") was established by the first bishop of New France, François de Laval, in 1664, making it the third oldest parish in the Côte-de-Beaupré. Its chapel was built in 1670. The place was originally known as Longue-Pointe (as shown on the 1641 map by Jean Bourdon) and as L'Ange Gardien by 1685 (as shown on the map by Jean de Deshayes).

In 1845, the Parish Municipality of Ange Gardien was established, abolished in 1847, but reestablished in 1855 (in 1964, the name was adjusted to include the definite article in its name). Its post office opened in 1861.

L'Ange-Gardien changed status from parish municipality to regular municipality on May 17, 2007.

== Demographics ==
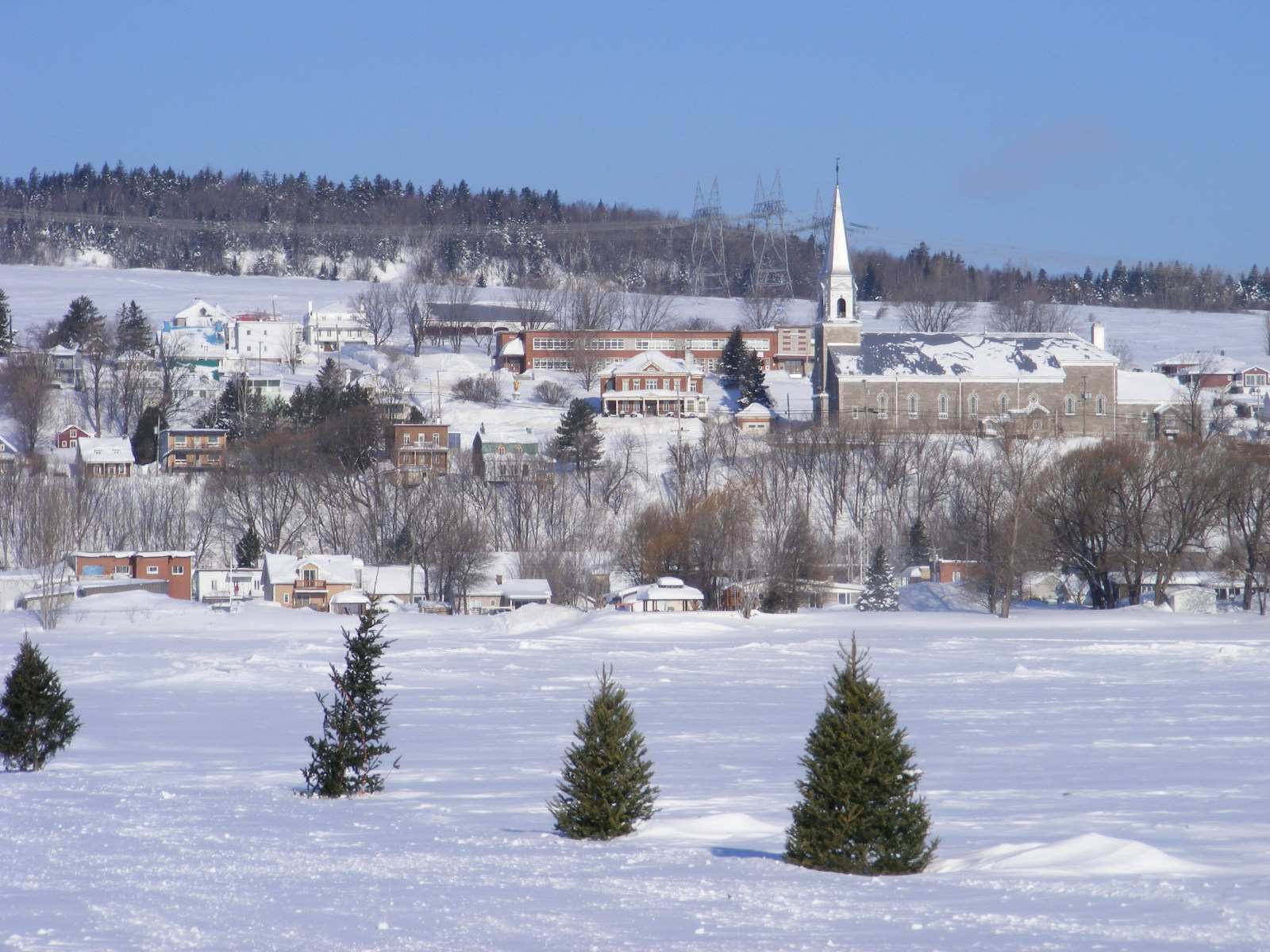
L'Ange-Gardien in winter as seen from the frozen St. Lawrence River.

Historical census populations – L'Ange-Gardien, Capitale-Nationale

Year	Pop.	±%
1871	1,049	—
1881	1,135	+8.2%
1891	1,137	+0.2%
1901	1,179	+3.7%
1911	1,447	+22.7%
1921	1,167	−19.4%
1931	1,332	+14.1%
1941	1,421	+6.7%

Year	Pop.	±%
1951	1,758	+23.7%
1956	1,944	+10.6%
1961	2,067	+6.3%
1966	2,102	+1.7%
1971	2,203	+4.8%
1976	2,313	+5.0%
1981	2,479	+7.2%
1986	2,412	−2.7%

Year	Pop.	±%
1991	2,819	+16.9%
1996	2,841	+0.8%
2001	2,815	−0.9%
2006	3,008	+6.9%
2011	3,634	+20.8%
2016	3,695	+1.7%
2021	3,842	+4.0%

Source: Statistics Canada

Private dwellings occupied by usual residents (2021): 1,632 (total dwellings: 1,717)

Mother tongue (2021):

- English as first language: 0.8%
- French as first language: 97.3%
- English and French as first language: 0.7%
- Other as first language: 1.0%

== Local government ==
List of former mayors:

- Joseph Gariépy (1845–1847)
- François Lépine (1855–1860)
- Charles Goulet (1860–1862)
- Pierre Jacob (1862–1864)
- Henri Huot (1864–1866, 1882–1884)
- Gabriel Garneau (1866–1872)
- François Laberge (1872–1876)
- Joseph C. Huot (1876–1877, 1888–1890)
- Joseph Gariépy (1877–1882)
- Joseph Huot (1884–1888)
- Augustin Bélanger (1890–1893)
- Antoine Mathieu (1893–1895)
- Cyrille Hébert (1895–1897)
- Hilaire Laberge (1897–1898)
- François Xavier Lefebvre (1898–1899)
- Isidore Garneau (1899–1900)
- Joseph C. Huot (1900–1906)
- Antoine Huot (1906–1907)
- Jacques Vézina (1907–1913)
- Elzéar Huot (1913–1914)
- Joseph Trudelle (1914–1916)
- Napoléon Gosselin (1917)
- Joseph Fortier (1917–1923)
- Romuald Côté (1923–1929, 1935–1939)
- Adélard Hébert (1929–1931)
- Léonce Mathieu (1931–1935)
- Louis Fecteau (1939–1955)
- Lucien Lefrançois (1955–1971)
- Lionel Tremblay (1971–1976)
- Ulric Fecteau (1976–1983)
- Joseph-Odilon-Adrien Laberge (1983–1985)
- Raymond Gariépy (1985–1989)
- Jocelyn Vézina (1989–1997)
- Denys Laberge (1997–2001)
- Pierre Lefrançois (2001–present)

== See also ==
- Rivers flowing through L'Ange-Gardien:
  - Chenal de l'Île d'Orléans
  - Rivière la Retenue
  - Rivière du Petit Pré
  - Ferrée River (Montmorency River tributary)
  - St. Lawrence River
- List of municipalities in Quebec
