= Duchesnay tourist resort =

Building in Quebec, Canada

Duschesnay tourist resort
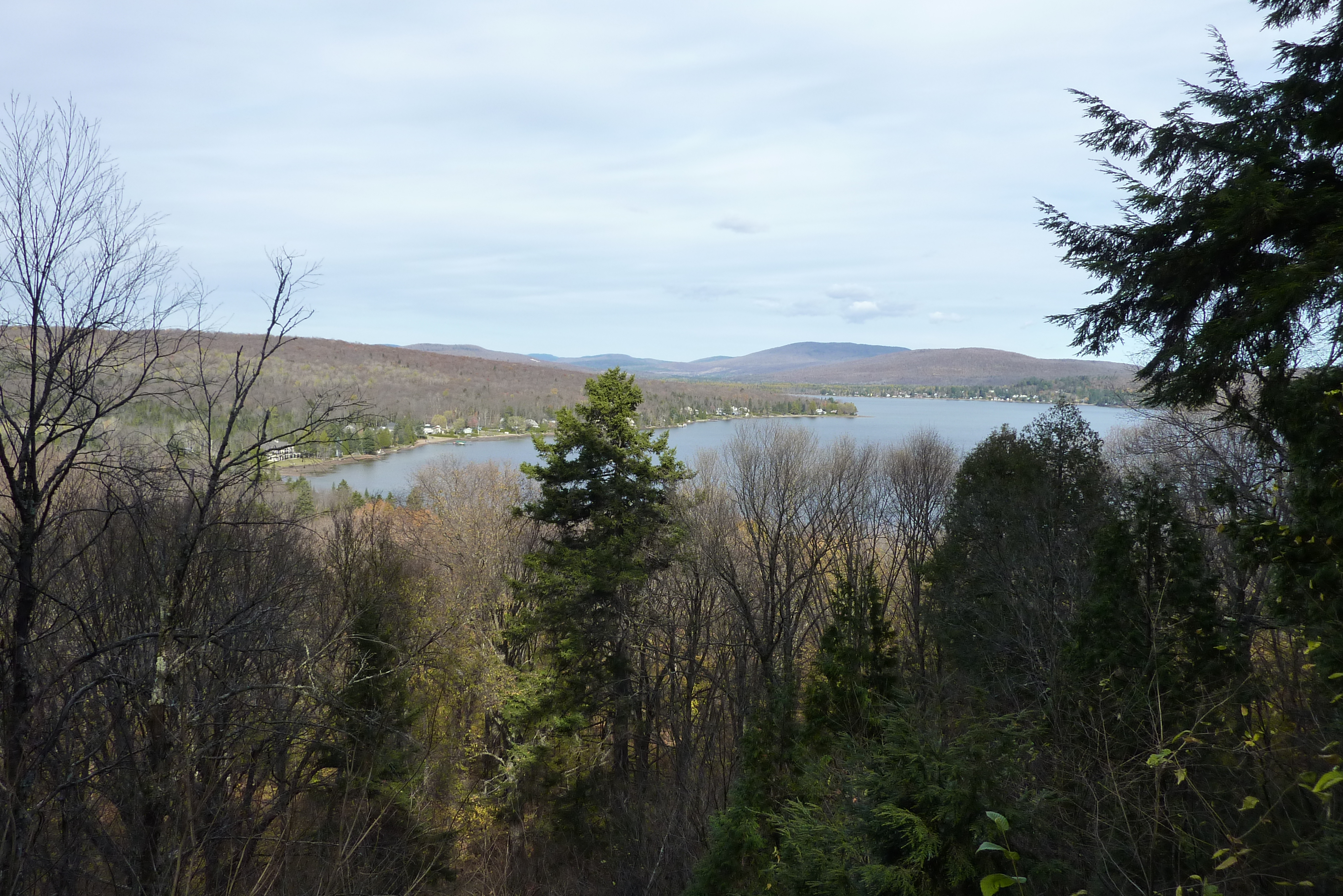
- View of Saint-Joseph Lake from the Station

[[Fossambault-sur-le-Lac, Quebec]]
- Coordinates: 46°52′10″N 71°38′25″W
- Status: Operating

The Station touristique Duchesnay (French: "Station touristique Duchesnay"), formerly known as the “Sanctuaire de Duchesnay”, is a resort park located on the edge of Saint-Joseph Lake, in the La Jacques-Cartier Regional County Municipality, in the administrative region of Capitale-Nationale, in Quebec (Canada). The territory of this station extends over several municipalities: Lac-Saint-Joseph, Sainte-Catherine-de-la-Jacques-Cartier (to the south), Lac-Sergent and Saint-Raymond (north). Duchesnay is operated by Société des établissements de plein air du Québec (SÉPAQ).

== Geography ==
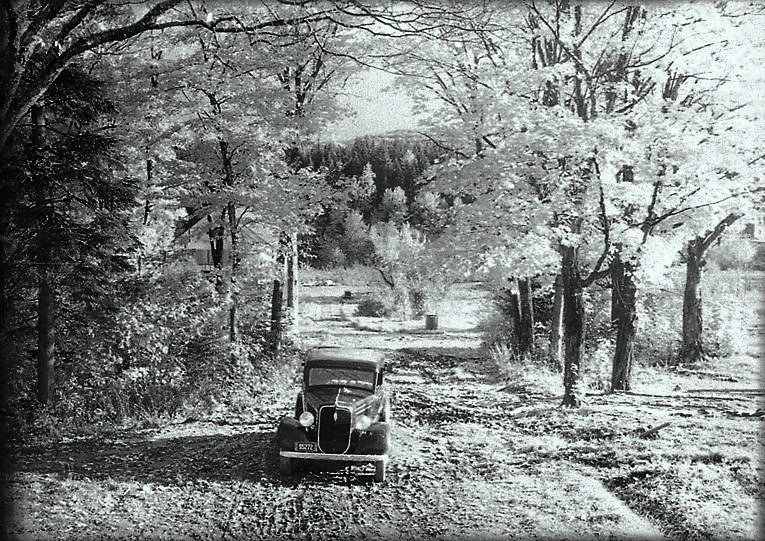
In 1935.

Located about thirty kilometers north-west of the city of Quebec, this nature center extends over 89 km² on the west, north and east shore of Saint-Joseph Lake. The main lakes in this territory are: Lac de Claire (to the north), Lac au Chien, Lac aux Deux Truites, Lac au Ventre Rouge and Lac au Cèdre. The tourist resort bypasses the east and south sides of Sept-Îles Lake.

The territory of the station extends between Sept-Îles Lake (northwest) to Lake Claire (north). To the west, the boundary of the territory is close to Sergent Lake. To the southwest, the territory includes the Duchesnay dam at the mouth of Saint-Joseph Lake. To the east, the territory extends to mont Sorrel. The territory includes several mountains, one peak reaching 422 m and the other 381 m.

At 159 m altitude, the waters of lac Saint-Joseph are retained by the Duchesnay dam, erected at the mouth in the territory of Sainte-Catherine-de-la-Jacques-Cartier. The waters flow into the Ontaritzi river (4.5 km long, measured by the current) which flows a priori from the dam for 600 m to the west, then turns to the southeast to flow on 2, 1 km. Finally, it flows into the Jacques-Cartier River, bypassing the Île à Prévost located at the mouth, opposite the village of Sainte-Catherine-de-la-Jacques-Cartier. The Ontaritzi River flows entirely into the territory of Sainte-Catherine-de-la-Jacques-Cartier.

The main access roads serving this tourist resort are:

- boul. Thomas Maher who goes around the lake Lac Saint-Joseph; except south-east in the territory of Fossambault-sur-le-Lac where it is designated "route de Fossambault";
- the Grande Ligne path which runs south of the mountains in the Duchesnay sector; to the west, north of Sergent Lake, this road is named "chemin Tour du lac Nord";
- chemin du Lac Sept-Îles which bypasses Sept-Îles Lake;
- several forest roads serve the territory.

== Main attractions ==
The Duchesnay Tourist Station offers many recreational tourism activities over four seasons: hiking, cross-country skiing, snowshoeing, dog sledding, ice fishing, snowmobiling, Hok skiing, canoeing, kayaking, pedalo, climbing, archery, activities guided, slide, bike, tree-to-tree excursion, nature watching, bear watching, horse riding, quad biking, marina, beach and swimming... In addition, the resort is equipped with a super Inukshuk labyrinth and a "Tyst Trädgård" spa of Scandinavian inspiration. This nature center offers stays in a refuge or at the Auberge Duchesnay.

=== Forest tracks of the Tourist Station ===
Generally, from mid-December (if the snow conditions allow it), the cross-country ski trails of the Duchesnay Station offer a network of 51 km of linear paths divided into several routes including 35.5 km for the classic step and 15.5 km for the skate step. This tourist resort also offers 30.5 km of snowshoe trails. This network of pistes offers four wood-heated huts, a well-equipped ski center, a ski school, with equipment rental service for board sports. At this SÉPAQ tourist resort, outdoor enthusiasts can practice various board sports, including skate skiing.

From the end of January, the summit trail (expert level) is reserved for skating (3.5 km, vertical drop of 139 m and negative of 157 m); this cross-country ski trail is traced on Fridays, Saturdays and Sundays. This path gives access to the Sommet refuge which has four places. A trail map allows users to navigate in the forest.

The various forest hikes lead to numerous observation points: peat bogs, maple groves, surrounding areas, forests where the sugar maple is generally predominant, views of Saint-Joseph Lake, the high castles, the summits... The trails of various lengths and offering various levels of difficulty are equipped with several walkways, lookouts, wooden stairs and trail signage. All trails start at the Horizon pavilion.

=== Multifunctional track ===
The multifunctional track Jacques Cartier crosses the high parishes of the county of Portneuf passing very close to the Duchesnay dam, near the Auberge Duchesnay, south of the Duchesnay tourist resort.

The Rivière-à-Pierre station is the end point (ie the 68th km) of this runway Jacques Cartier, which is designated no. 6 of the "Route verte" since 2007 and of the "Trans Canada Trail" of cycle paths. The development of this track was initiated in 1993 by leaders of the region and was officially opened to the public in July 1998. Thanks to the efforts of Portneuf Regional County Municipality and La Jacques-Cartier Regional County Municipality for the acquisition of land, this track was built on the right-of-way of the old disused railway line of Canadian National (designated "Corridor of railwaymen"), linking Rivière-à-Pierre to Sainte-Catherine-de-la-Jacques-Cartier. Starting from Rivière-à-Pierre, this former railway corridor crosses, from east to west, a series of picturesque villages in Comté de Portneuf, generally following route 367:

- Saint-Léonard-de-Portneuf (km 39.3),
- Saint-Raymond (km 32.5),
- Lac-Sergent (km 21.7),
- Sainte-Catherine-de-la-Jacques-Cartier (km 14), with a passage to the south of the tourist resort Duchesnay,
- Shannon (km 4,6),
- Saint-Gabriel-de-Valcartier (km 0).

This trail has various service points (nearby) for hikers: accommodation, restaurant, convenience store, public toilets, rest areas, shelters, picnic tables, some drinking water points, parking, etc. It also offers enchanting landscapes and observation sites (e.g. the Duchesnay dam) with landscaped lookouts. This track also connects to other cycle paths (e.g. the Dansereau track of 16 kilometres (9.9 mi) connecting Pont-Rouge to Sainte-Catherine-de-la-Jacques-Cartier) or mountain bike trails. This track is mainly used by cyclists, walkers and inline skaters; and in winter, by snowshoeing, cross-country skiing or walking.

=== Auberge Duchesnay ===
Inaugurated in December 2003, the Auberge Duchesnay constitutes a 48-room accommodation and gastronomic center for tourists or business meetings. Located near the mouth of Saint-Joseph Lake, that is to the south of the territory of the Duchesnay Tourist Station, the Auberge Duchesnay, the three pavilions (comprising 8, 12 and 20 bedrooms each with a living room with fireplace) and the 14 waterfront chalet units have picturesque architecture with exterior façades generally made of round wood. The pavilions underwent a major renovation in 2000; they are remnants of the vast campus of a forestry school. The mountain to the northwest near the Inn rises to 247 m.

This hotel complex offers a wide variety of recreational and tourist activities that integrate with the Duchesnay tourist resort. This establishment participates in the recognition program in sustainable development.

== See also ==
- Fossambault-sur-le-Lac, municipality
- Lac-Saint-Joseph, municipality
- Sainte-Catherine-de-la-Jacques-Cartier, municipality
- Saint-Joseph Lake, body of water
- Mont Sorrel
- Rivière aux Pins
- Rivière de la Somme
