= Quebec City Area =

Coordinates: 46.7°N 71.3°W

Québec City Metropolitan Area
- Census Metropolitan Area
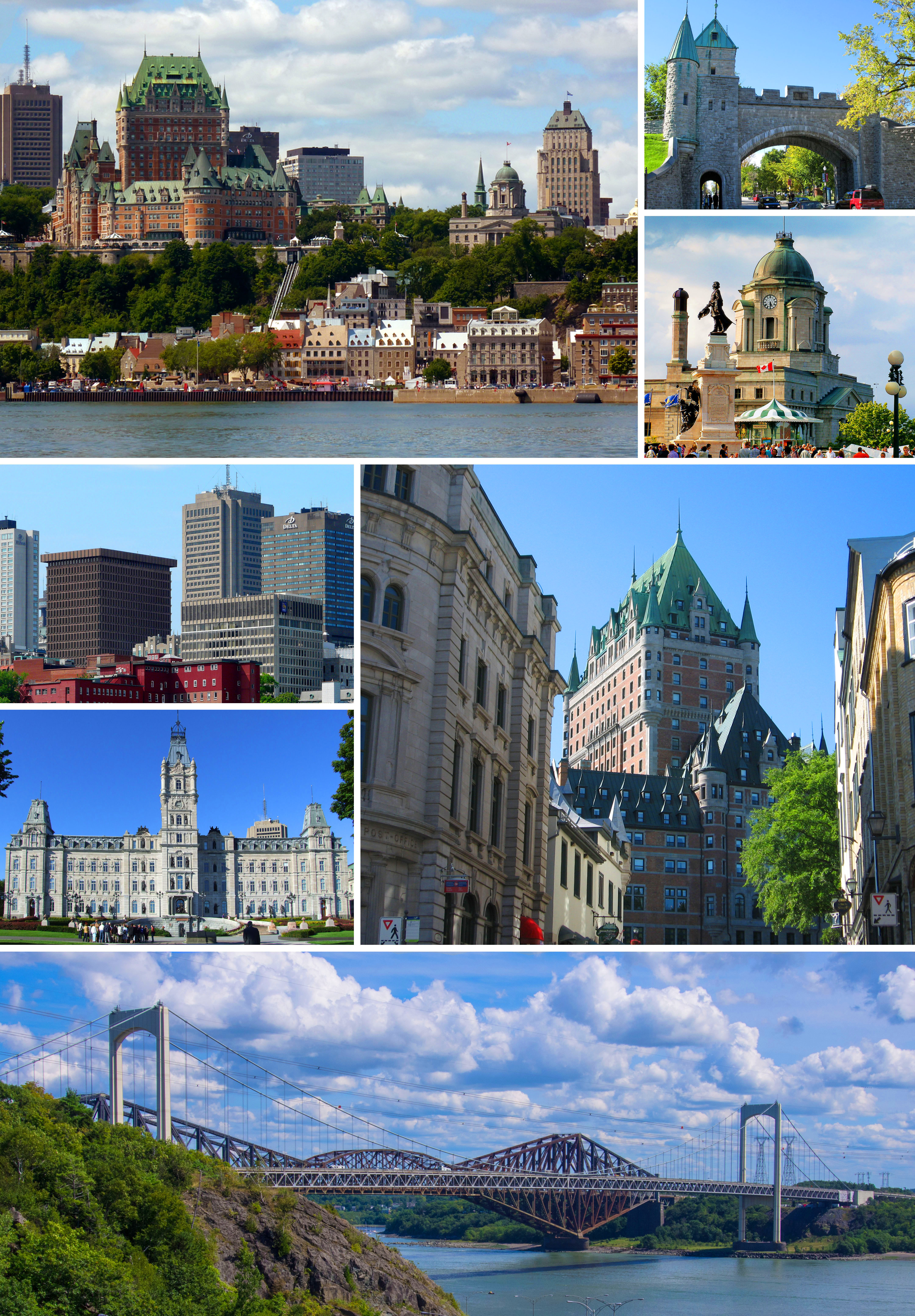
- From top, left to right: Quebec City from the St. Lawrence River, the Ramparts of Quebec City, waterfront in Old Quebec, skyscrapers in Vieux-Québec, Parliament Building, Château Frontenac, Pierre Laporte Bridge
Interactive Map of Québec City CMA
Quebec City / Ville de Québec
Levis / Lévis
Québec City, Que. CMA
- Country: Canada
- Province: Québec

GDP
- Time zone: UTC−5 (EST)
  - Summer (DST): UTC−4 (EDT)

The Quebec City Area (or Région de Québec in French) is the metropolitan area surrounding Quebec City, in the Canadian province of Quebec. It consists of two administrative regions: Capitale-Nationale and Chaudière-Appalaches.

== Population ==
The Quebec City Area had a population of 682,757 in the 2001 Canadian census. The Quebec City Area had a population of 715,515 in the 2006 Canadian census. The Quebec-Levis area had a population of 1,109,184 in 2006. In 2011, the Quebec City area, consisting of the Capitale Nationale and Chaudière-Appalaches census divisions, had a population of 1,111,245

== Members ==
=== Capitale-Nationale ===
- Main city: Quebec City

- Baie-Sainte-Catherine
- Baie-Saint-Paul
- Beaupré
- Boischatel
- Cap-Santé
- Château-Richer
- Clermont
- Deschambault-Grondines
- Donnacona
- Fossambault-sur-le-Lac
- Île d'Orléans **
- Lac-Beauport
- Lac-Delage
- Lac-Saint-Joseph
- Lac-Sergent
- La Malbaie
- L'Ancienne-Lorette
- L'Ange-Gardien
- Les Éboulements
- L'Isle-aux-Coudres
- Neuville
- Notre-Dame-des-Monts
- Petite-Rivière-Saint-François
- Pont-Rouge
- Portneuf
- Rivière-à-Pierre
- Saint-Aimé-des-Lacs
- Saint-Alban
- Sainte-Anne-de-Beaupré
- Saint-Augustin-de-Desmaures
- Saint-Basile
- Sainte-Brigitte-de-Laval
- Sainte-Catherine-de-la-Jacques-Cartier
- Saint-Casimir
- Sainte-Christine-d'Auvergne
- Saint-Ferréol-les-Neiges
- Saint-Gabriel-de-Valcartier
- Saint-Hilarion
- Saint-Irénée
- Saint-Joachim
- Saint-Léonard-de-Portneuf
- Saint-Louis-de-Gonzague-du-Cap-Tourmente
- Saint-Marc-des-Carrières
- Saint-Raymond
- Saint-Siméon
- Saint-Tite-des-Caps
- Saint-Ubalde
- Saint-Urbain
- Shannon
- Stoneham-et-Tewkesbury
- Wendake *

* Wendake is an Indian reserve enclaved within Quebec City.
** L'Île d'Orléans contains six parishes.

=== Chaudières-Appalaches ===
- Main city: Lévis

- MRC de Beauce-Sartignan
- MRC de Bellechasse
- MRC de Les Appalaches
- MRC de La Nouvelle-Beauce
- MRC de Les Etchemins
- MRC de L'Islet
- MRC de Lotbinière
- MRC de Montmagny
- MRC de Robert-Cliche

== Demographics ==
Mother tongue (2011)
Language	Quebec CMA	Quebec	Canada
French	95.6%	79.7%	22.0%
English	1.9%	9.6%	58.6%
Spanish	0.8%	1.8%	1.3%
Arabic	0.5%	2.1%	1.1%
Portuguese	0.2%	0.5%	0.7%
Vietnamese	0.1%	0.4%	0.5%
Unspecified Chinese	0.1%	0.6%	1.3%
Italian	0.1%	1.6%	1.3%
Romanian	0.1%	0.4%	0.3%
Bosnian	0.1%	<0.1%	<0.1%
German	0.1%	0.2%	1.3%
Nepali	0.1%	<0.1%	<0.1%
Russian	0.1%	0.3%	0.5%
Swahili	0.1%	<0.1%	<0.1%
Creole	0.1%	0.8%	0.2%
Cambodian	0.1%	0.1%	<0.1%
~~	~~	~~	~~
Montagnais/Innu	0.04%	0.11%	0.03%
