= Petite rivière aux Pins =

- Location within Quebec

Location
- Country: Canada
- Province: Quebec
- Region: Capitale-Nationale
- Regional County Municipality: La Jacques-Cartier Regional County Municipality

Physical characteristics
- Source: Forested creek
  - location: Saint-Gabriel-de-Valcartier
  - coordinates: 47°02′46″N 71°32′46″W
  - elevation: 458 m
- Mouth: Rivière aux Pins
  - location: Saint-Gabriel-de-Valcartier
  - coordinates: 47°00′10″N 71°33′41″W
  - elevation: 159 m
- Length: 7.0 km (4.3 mi)

Basin features
- Tributaries
  - left: (Upward from the mouth) Décharge de treize petits lacs non identifiés, décharge d'un lac non identifié, décharge de trois petits lacs non identifiés, décharge de huit petits lacs non identifiés, décharge de deux petits lacs non identifiés, décharge d'un petit lac non identifié.
  - right: (Upward from the mouth) Décharge de cinq petits lacs non identifiés dont le lac Cattolica, ruisseau non identifié.

The Petite rivière aux Pins is a tributary of the Rivière aux Pins, flowing entirely in the territory of Saint-Gabriel-de-Valcartier, in the La Jacques-Cartier Regional County Municipality, in the administrative region of Capitale-Nationale, in Quebec, in Canada.

The Petite Rivière aux Pins valley is served by a secondary forest road. Forestry is the main economic activity; recreational tourism, second.

The surface of the Petite rivière aux Pins (except the rapids areas) is generally frozen from the beginning of December to the end of March; safe circulation on the ice is generally done from the end of December to the beginning of March. The water level of the river varies with the seasons and the precipitation.

== Geography ==
The Petite rivière aux Pins draws its main source from an unidentified lake (length: 0.5 kilometres (0.31 mi); altitude: 453 metres (1,486 ft)) in the municipality of Saint-Gabriel-de-Valcartier. This lake enclosed between the mountains is located in a forest area outside (southwest side) of the limit of the ecological reserve of Tantaré and on the south side of Lake Tantaré.

The mouth of this head lake is located 4.5 kilometres (2.8 mi) west of the course of the Jacques-Cartier River, 2.4 kilometres (1.5 mi) to the south west of the course of the Cassian River, at 5.0 kilometres (3.1 mi) north of the confluence of the Petite rivière aux Pins with the Rivière aux Pins and 17.4 kilometres (10.8 mi) north of the confluence of the Rivière aux Pins with the Saint-Joseph Lake.

From the mouth of the head lake, the Petite rivière aux Pins flows over 7.0 kilometres (4.3 mi), with a drop of 299 metres (981 ft), according to the following segments:

- 4.0 kilometres (2.5 mi) generally towards the south by collecting two streams (coming from the northwest), up to a stream (coming from the northeast);
- 2.9 kilometres (1.8 mi) southerly collecting the discharge (coming from the northwest) from Lake Cattolica, to a bend corresponding to the discharge (coming from the east) of 13 small lakes;
- 0.1 kilometres (0.062 mi) westward to its mouth

The confluence of the Petite Rivière aux Pins and the Rivière aux Pins is located 5.1 kilometres (3.2 mi) west of the Jacques-Cartier River, at 12.9 kilometres (8.0 mi) at north of the confluence of the aux Pins river with lac Saint-Joseph, 6.0 kilometres (3.7 mi) northwest of the village center of Saint-Gabriel-de-Valcartier.

From this confluence, the current flows on:

- 26.6 kilometres (16.5 mi) generally south along the course of the Pins River, to the north shore of Lac Saint-Joseph;
- 3.9 kilometres (2.4 mi) to the south by crossing Lake Saint-Joseph to the dam at the mouth;
- 4.8 kilometres (3.0 mi) following the course of the Ontaritzi River;
- 15.4 kilometres (9.6 mi) following the course of the Jacques-Cartier river, to the northwest shore of the Saint-Laurent river.

== Toponymy ==
The various pine species are a common conifer in eastern Canada. The pines were used as firewood, building materials or furniture. This soft wood is easy to saw, perforate or laminate. The term "pine" is often used in toponyms used in the territory of Quebec.

The toponym "Petite rivière aux Pins" was formalized on December 5, 1968, at the Place Names Bank of the Commission de toponymie du Québec

== See also ==
- List of rivers of Quebec
