= Rivière aux Pins (Saint-Joseph Lake) =

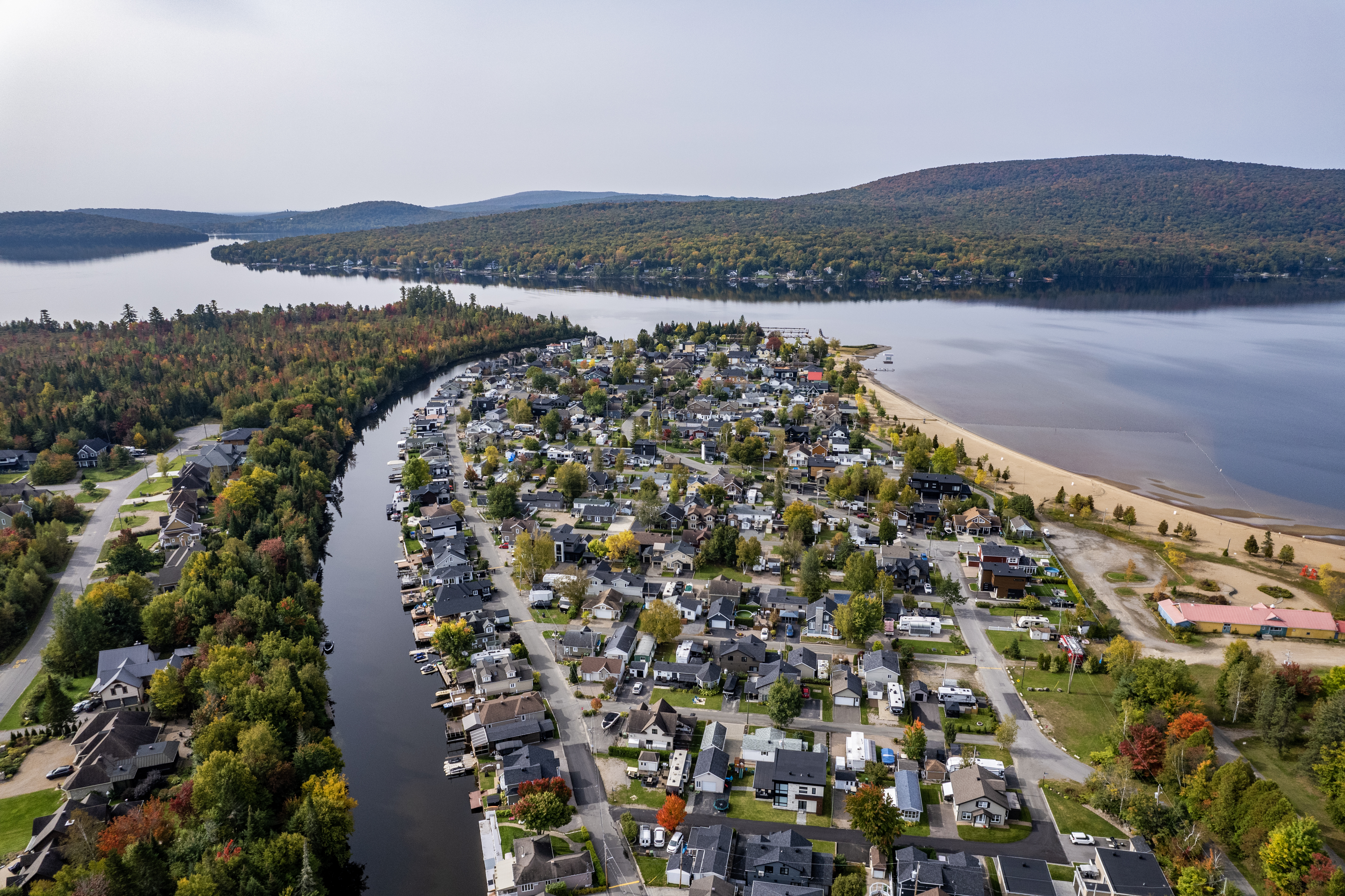

- Location within Quebec

Location
- Country: Canada
- Province: Quebec
- Region: Capitale-Nationale
- Regional County Municipality: La Jacques-Cartier Regional County Municipality

Physical characteristics
- Source: Tantaré Lake
  - location: Saint-Gabriel-de-Valcartier
  - coordinates: 47°04′01″N 71°32′47″W
  - elevation: 453
- Mouth: Saint-Joseph Lake
  - location: Fossambault-sur-le-Lac
  - coordinates: 46°54′04″N 71°37′34″W
  - elevation: 159 m
- Length: 32.7 km (20.3 mi)

Basin features
- Tributaries
  - left: (Upward from the mouth) Petite Rivière aux Pins, décharge du Lac Perceval
  - right: (Upward from the mouth) Décharge du Lac de la Rivière-aux-Pins, décharge du lac San-Angelo, Rivière de la Somme

The Rivière aux Pins is a watercourse flowing in several municipalities of La Jacques-Cartier Regional County Municipality, in the administrative region of Capitale-Nationale, in Quebec, in Canada. The municipalities crossed by this 32.7 kilometres (20.3 mi) river (measured by the current), are Saint-Gabriel-de-Valcartier (18.9 km), Shannon (11,0 km) and Fossambault-sur-le-Lac (2.8 km).

The lower part of the Pins river valley is mainly served by the Duchesnay road and the Kilkenny street (west bank). The rest of this river is served by various secondary forest roads.

Forestry is the main economic activity in the sector; recreational tourism, second. Located to the northwest of the city of Quebec, Saint-Joseph Lake is a very popular site for recreational tourism activities including the resort.

The surface of the Rivière aux Pins (except the rapids areas) is generally frozen from the beginning of December to the end of March; safe circulation on the ice is generally done from the end of December to the beginning of March. The water level of the river varies with the seasons and the precipitation.

== Geography ==
The Rivière aux Pins draws its main source from Lake Tantaré (453 m above sea level) in the municipality of Saint-Gabriel-de-Valcartier. This lake has three sections that feed from the outlet of Lac Belle Truite and mountain streams, the highest peak of which reaches 722 m. In this area the Cassian hydrographic slope is located next to the east side of the "Rivière aux Pins"; while the "Marten Creek" is located on the west side.

Surrounded by high mountains, Lake Tantaré is a wild and mountainous environment difficult to access, located in the territory of the Canadian Forces base at Valcartier. Its mouth is located on the south side of the western point of the lake, empties into the Rivière aux Pins, of which it constitutes the head lake.

Route in Saint-Gabriel-de-Valcartier The waters descending a priori to the south for 3.6 km (measured by the current) in a small valley surrounded by mountains, to the mouth of the Rivière-aux-Pins lake which feeds from the Furiani lakes ( 542 m above sea level), Potenza (391 m), Cesena (347 m) and Reggio (345 m). Then the waters descend to the southeast for 4.1 km (along the forest road) (passing 1.2 km from the fire-tower located at the top (altitude of 607 m) of the mountain of Lake San Angelo (altitude 369 m) to the mouth (altitude 217 m) of the Petite rivière aux Pins (5.9 km long), which descends from the north. at Lac Michel (408 m above sea level) located 0.9 km south of Lac Tantaré The "Petite rivière aux Pins" is the most important tributary of the left bank of the "Rivière aux Pins".

The course of the Pine River continues for 4.1 km southwest to the outlet (altitude of 188 m) of Lake San-Angelo. The river then crosses the "Plain of Sangro" located in a wide valley surrounded by mountains including a summit of 419 m. to the northwest and another 358 m above sea level to the east. Then the river takes the form of streamers for 2.1 km south-west until the mouth of a discharge from a small mountain lake (318 m above sea level).

From there, the Rivière aux Pins continues its descent for 5.0 km to the forest road bridge and 1.6 km to the limit of the municipality of Saint-Gabriel-de-Valcartier and Shannon.

Course in Shannon From this municipal limit, the river flows a segment of 1.6 westward in Shannon to the mouth of the Somme river whose waters come from the northwest from the lakes "Grande Ligne", Martin and Noir. Then the river goes southeast for 4.4 km and branches off to the southwest to cover a segment of 5.0 km to the limit of Fossambault-sur-le-Lac. In this last segment, the river flows between Mount Casa-Berardi (to the south) (388 m above sea level) and Mount Sorrel (to the north) (378 m above sea level).

Course in Fossambault-sur-le-Lac The distance is 1.5 km, between the northeast limit of Shannon and the Fossambault road/Thomas-Maher road bridge; however, this segment includes 0.8 km serving as the common boundary between the two municipalities. After this bridge, the river flows a last segment of 1.3 km southwest to its mouth on the east shore of Saint-Joseph Lake in the municipality of Fossambault-sur-le-Lac.

From this confluence, the current flows on:

- 3.9 kilometres (2.4 mi) south across Lake Saint-Joseph to the dam at the mouth;
- 4.8 kilometres (3.0 mi) following the course of the Ontaritzi River;
- 15.4 kilometres (9.6 mi) following the course of the Jacques-Cartier River, to the northwest shore of the Saint-Laurent river.

== Toponymy ==
The various pine species are a common conifer in eastern Canada. The pines were used as firewood, building materials or furniture. This soft wood is easy to saw, perforate or laminate. The term "pine" is often used in toponyms used in the territory of Quebec.

The toponym "Rivière aux Pins" was formalized on December 5, 1968, at the Place Names Bank of the Commission de toponymie du Québec

== See also ==
- List of rivers of Quebec
