= Rivière de la Somme =

Location
- Country: Canada
- Province: Quebec
- Region: Capitale-Nationale
- Regional County Municipality: La Jacques-Cartier Regional County Municipality

Physical characteristics
- Source: Noir Lake
  - location: Saint-Gabriel-de-Valcartier
  - coordinates: 46°59′36″N 71°36′52″W
  - elevation: 479
- Mouth: Rivière aux Pins
  - location: Shannon
  - coordinates: 46°57′01″N 71°35′43″W
  - elevation: 167 m
- Length: 32.7 km (20.3 mi)

The Rivière de la Somme is a watercourse flowing in the municipalities of Saint-Gabriel-de-Valcartier and Shannon, in the La Jacques-Cartier Regional County Municipality, in the administrative region of Capitale-Nationale, in Quebec, in Canada.

Located in a forest environment, this river is part of the territory of the Duchesnay tourist resort. Forestry has been the dominant economic activity in this sector since XVIIIth. In XIXth the recreational-tourist activities were highlighted.

The river is generally frozen from November to April; however, the period of safe circulation on the ice is usually from mid-December to the end of March. The water level of the river varies with the seasons and the precipitation.

== Geography ==
The "Somme river" originates from Lac Noir (about 166 m in diameter; altitude: 479 m) in the municipality of Saint-Gabriel-de-Valcartier. This lake flows from the southeast, in a discharge flowing south over 312 m, to Lake Martin (length of about 400 m; altitude: 347 m), which is surrounded by a marshy area at the 'west and north. Its 0.65 km discharge flows south to Lake Grande Ligne (417 m long; altitude: 295 m) which the current crosses for 188 m.

The discharge of the latter flows over 1.1 km in swampy area, first 0.65 km to the west, then southwest to the discharge (0.65 km long) of Lake Biferno (located in Saint-Raymond-de-Portneuf), coming from the west. Then the river flows 4.2 km south in Shannon; then east, to a stream from the north, from Saint-Gabriel-de-Valcartier. The river continues south for 1.9 km in Shannon crossing a marshy area, until the outlet of the lakes: "à la voile", "étang long", Try, "on the Island" and Ravenna.

Then the river continues south for 0.73 km to its mouth (altitude: 167 m) which flows into the Rivière aux Pins; this mouth is located 1.6 km north of the summit of Mont Sorrel. This last river flows into lac Saint-Joseph.

== Toponymy ==
This Quebec toponym originates from the river Somme which flows in the North-West of France in region Hauts-de-France. This French river crosses the two departments of Aisne and Somme. This river gives its name to the department of Somme.

The Quebec toponym "rivière de la Somme" is linked to the Quebec toponym Mont Sorrel which evokes a mountain near Ypres, in Belgium, where is occurred in the salient of Ypres a battle of the First World War between three divisions of the 2e British Army and three divisions of the IVth German Army, from June 2 to June 14, 1916.

The toponym "Rivière de la Somme" was formalized on January 22, 1974, at the Place Names Bank of the Commission de toponymie du Québec.

== See also ==
- List of rivers of Quebec
