= Lake St. Joseph =

Lake St. Joseph (in English) or Lac Saint-Joseph (in French) may refer to:

== Lakes ==
- Lake St. Joseph, Ontario, Canada
- Saint-Joseph Lake (La Jacques-Cartier), Quebec, Canada

== Municipalities ==
- Lac-Saint-Joseph, Quebec, Canada
- Saint-Joseph-du-Lac, Quebec, Canada
