= List of towns in Quebec =

This is the list of municipalities that have the Quebec municipality type of city (ville, code=V), an administrative division defined by the Ministry of Municipal Affairs, Regions and Land Occupancy.

Although the terms "city" and "town" are both used in the category name because of common English usage, Quebec does not contain any cities under the current law; this list thus includes all villes, regardless of whether they are referred to as cities or towns in English.

== List ==
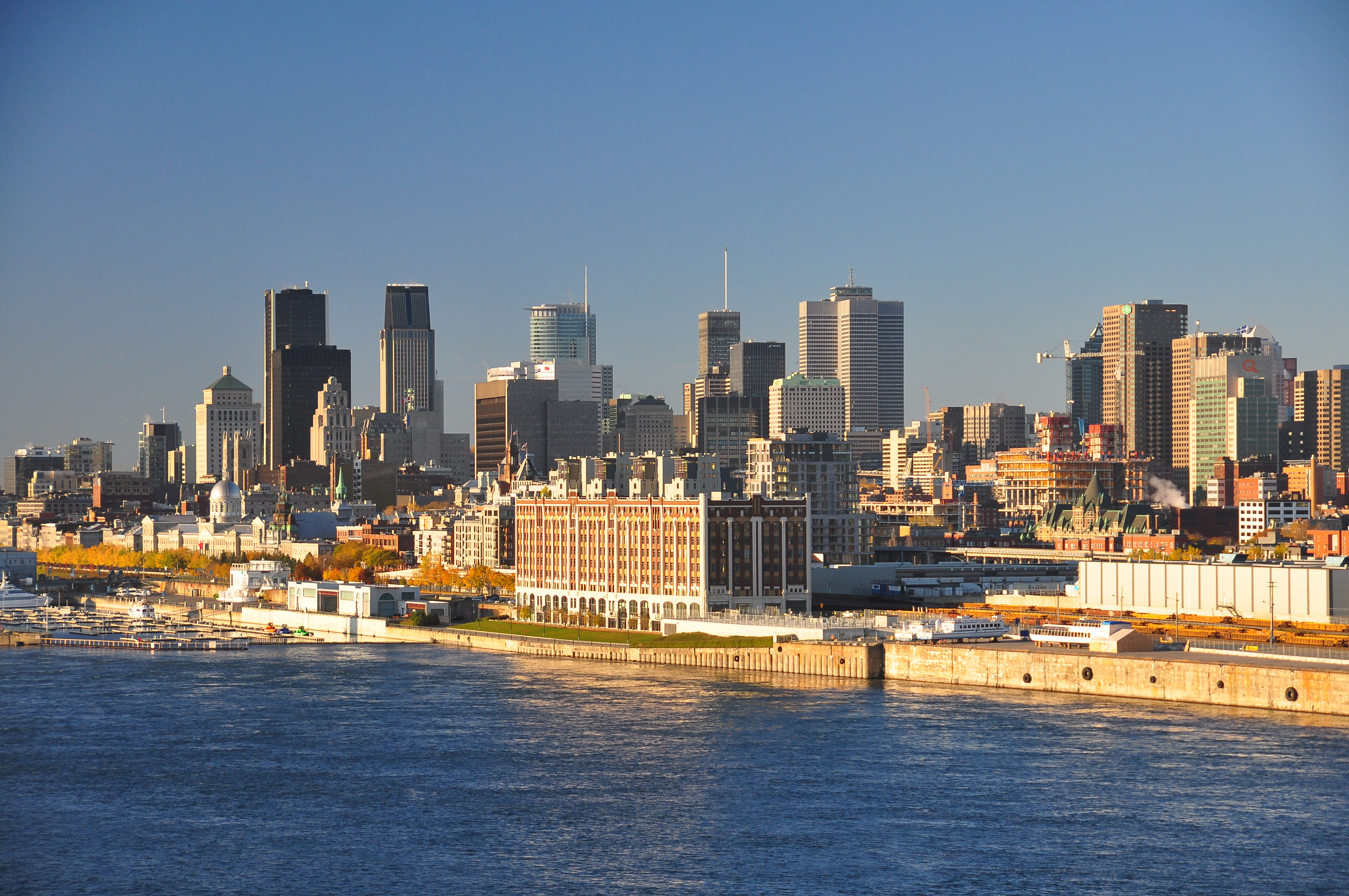
Montreal is Quebec's largest city and Canada's second largest city.

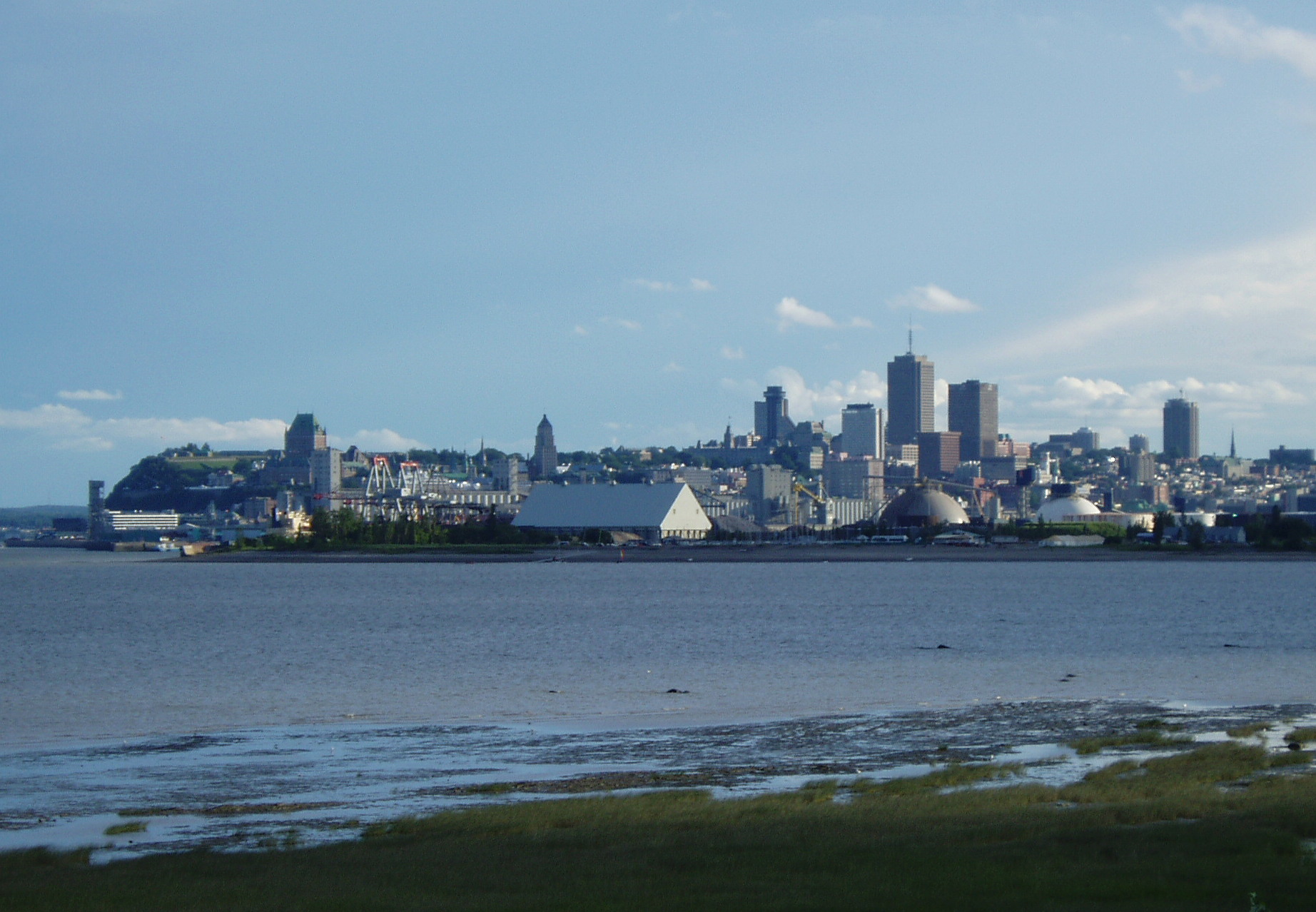
Quebec City is Quebec's capital and second largest city.

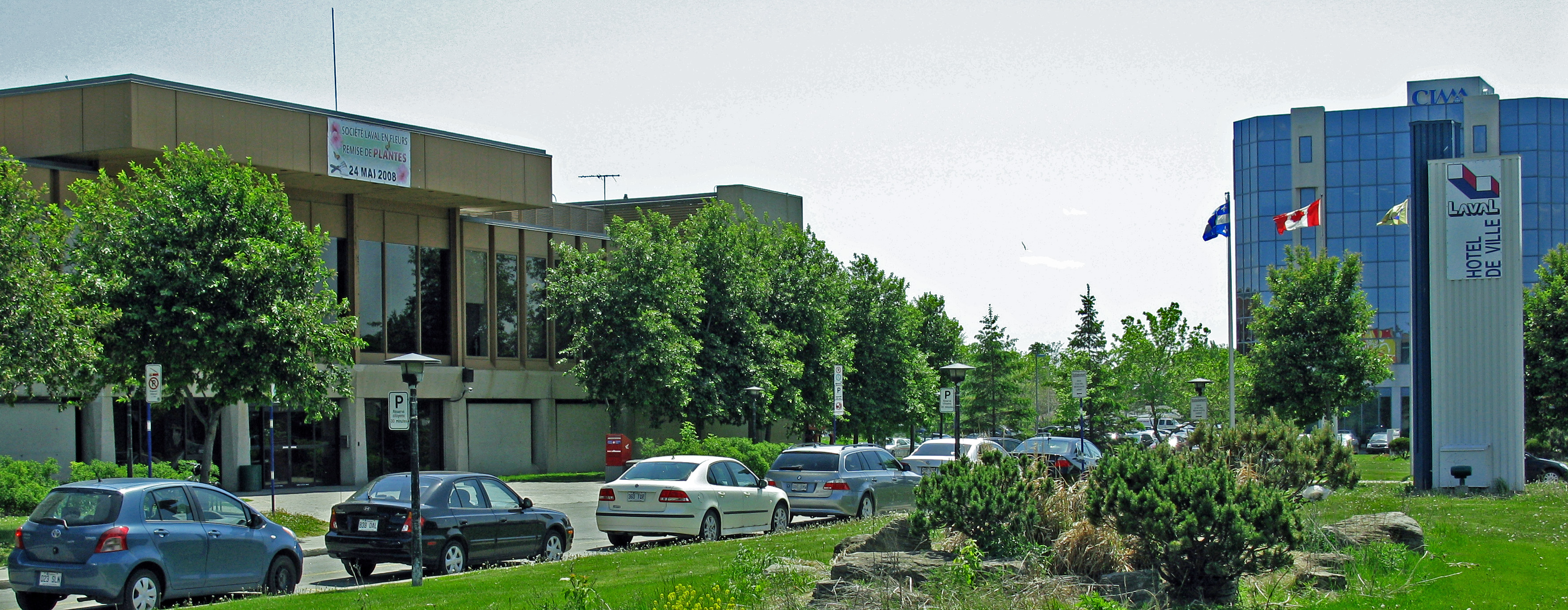
Laval townhall

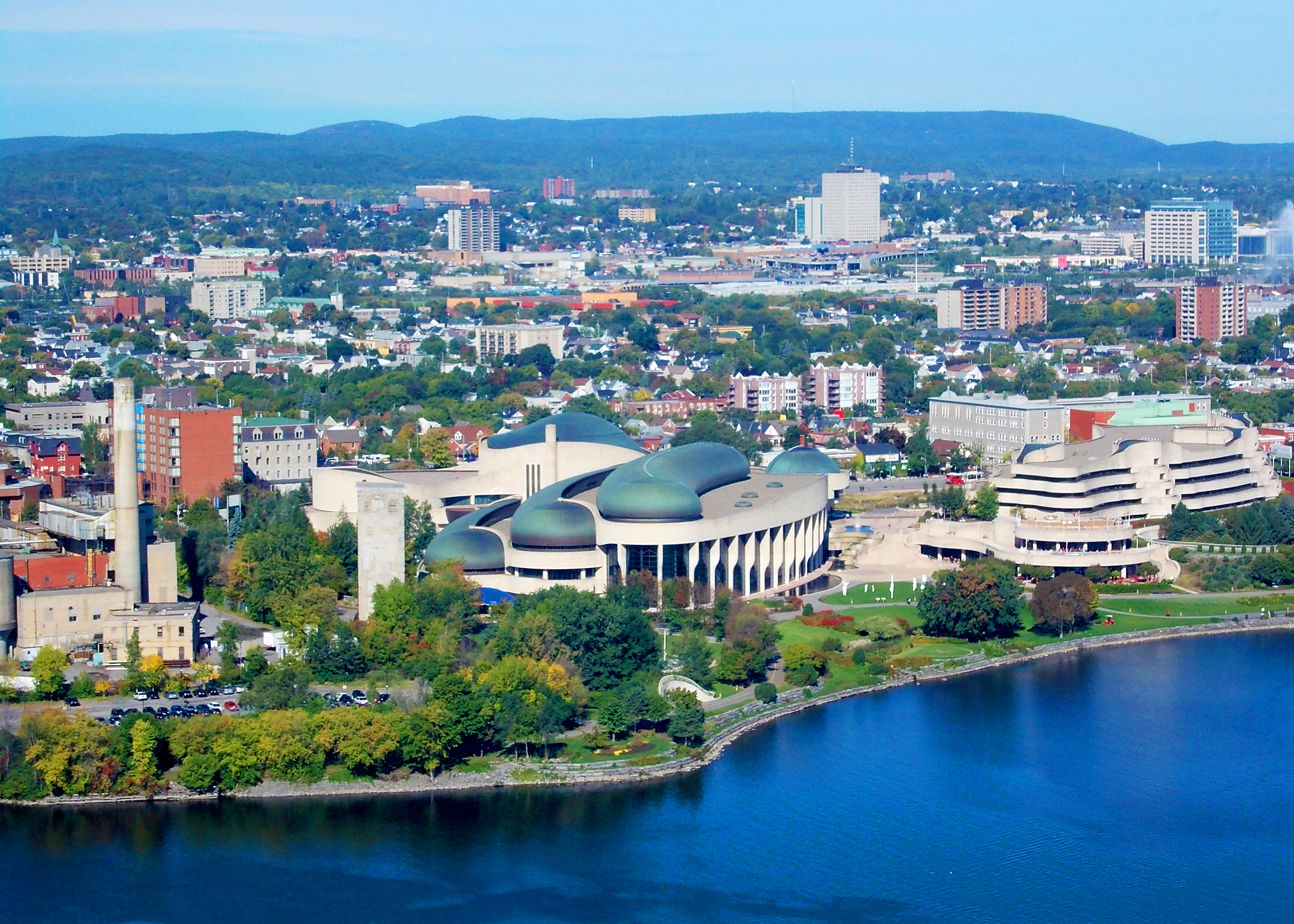
Gatineau is part of the National Capital Region.

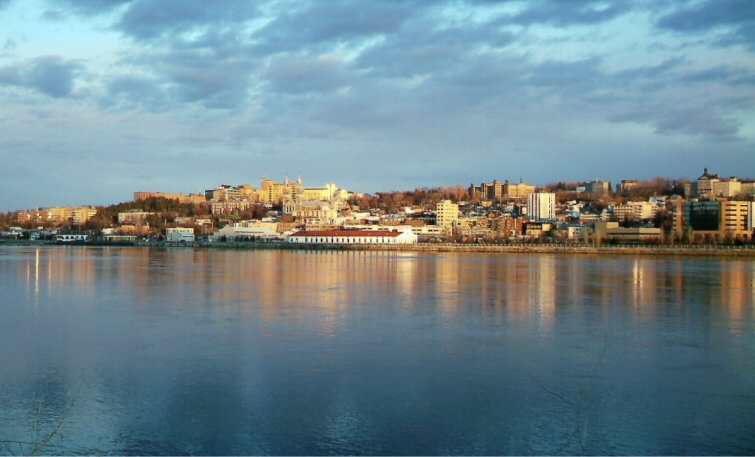
View of Saguenay

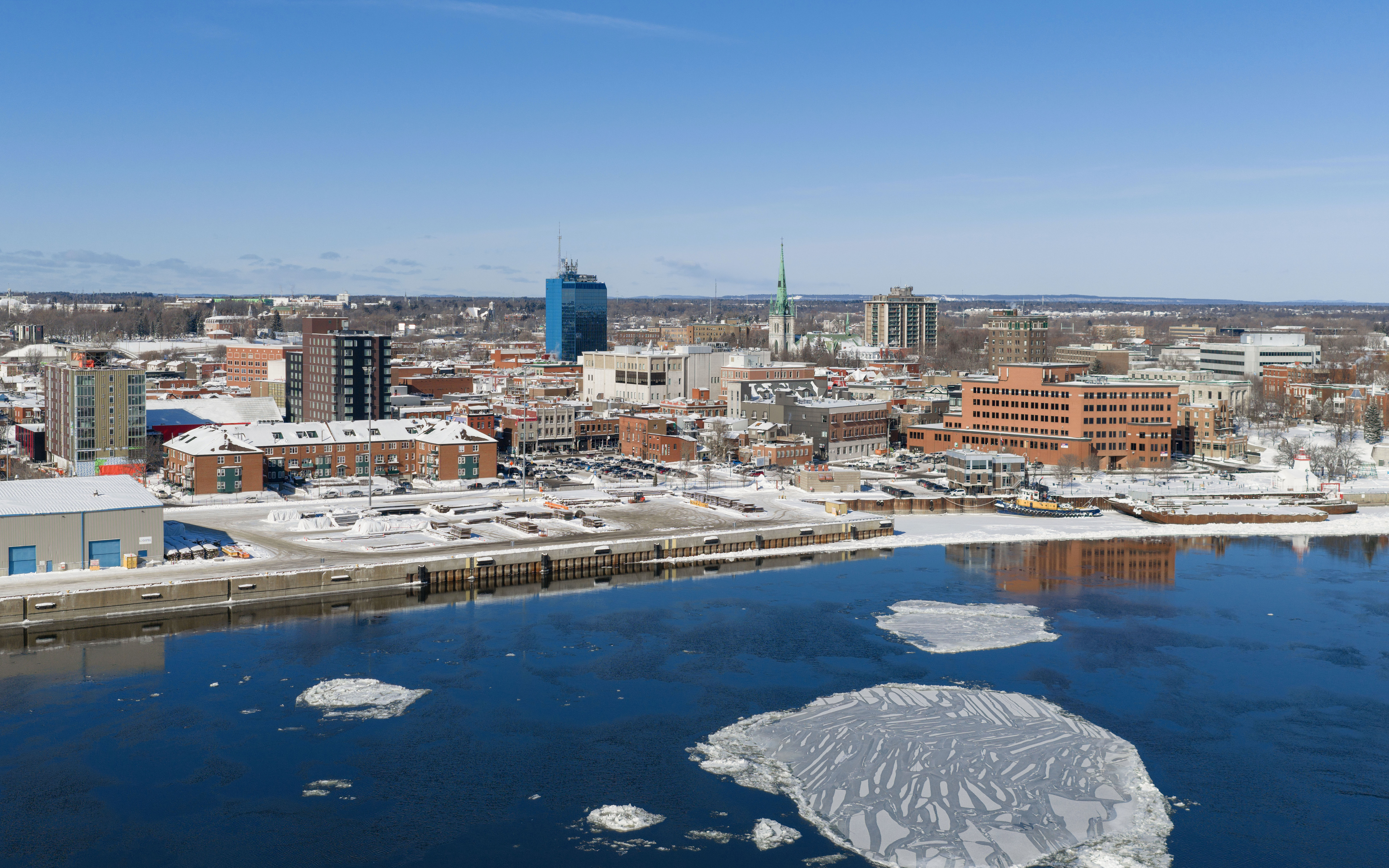
Trois-Rivières is the economic hub of the Mauricie region.

Name	Region	Census division	CMA/CA	Population (2021)	Population (2016)	Change (%)	Area (km^{2})	Population density (/km^{2})
Acton Vale	Montérégie	Acton		7,605	7,656	−0.7%	91.01	83.6
Alma	Saguenay–Lac-Saint-Jean	Lac-Saint-Jean-Est		30,331	30,771	−1.4%	194.92	155.6
Amos	Abitibi-Témiscamingue	Abitibi	Amos	12,675	12,823	−1.2%	429.04	29.5
Amqui	Bas-Saint-Laurent	La Matapédia		5,999	6,178	−2.9%	121.02	49.6
Baie-Comeau	Côte-Nord	Manicouagan	Baie-Comeau	20,687	21,536	−3.9%	334.83	61.8
Baie-D'Urfé	Montréal	Montréal	Montréal	3,764	3,823	−1.5%	6.03	624.2
Baie-Saint-Paul	Capitale-Nationale	Charlevoix		7,371	7,146	+3.1%	545.85	13.5
Barkmere	Laurentides	Les Laurentides		81	58	+39.7%	17.72	4.6
Beaconsfield	Montréal	Montréal	Montréal	19,277	19,324	−0.2%	11.03	1,747.7
Beauceville	Chaudière-Appalaches	Beauce-Centre		6,185	6,291	−1.7%	164.59	37.6
Beauharnois	Montérégie	Beauharnois-Salaberry	Montréal	13,638	12,884	+5.9%	68.22	199.9
Beaupré	Capitale-Nationale	La Côte-de-Beaupré		4,117	3,752	+9.7%	22.97	179.2
Bécancour	Centre-du-Québec	Bécancour	Trois-Rivières	13,561	13,031	+4.1%	439.54	30.9
Bedford	Montérégie	Brome-Missisquoi		2,558	2,560	−0.1%	4.23	604.7
Belleterre	Abitibi-Témiscamingue	Témiscamingue		285	313	−8.9%	544.49	0.5
Beloeil	Montérégie	La Vallée-du-Richelieu	Montréal	24,104	22,458	+7.3%	24.38	988.7
Berthierville	Lanaudière	D'Autray		4,386	4,189	+4.7%	6.77	647.9
Blainville	Laurentides	Thérèse-De Blainville	Montréal	59,819	56,863	+5.2%	54.97	1,088.2
Boisbriand	Laurentides	Thérèse-De Blainville	Montréal	28,308	26,884	+5.3%	27.67	1,023.1
Bois-des-Filion	Laurentides	Thérèse-De Blainville	Montréal	10,159	9,636	+5.4%	4.36	2,330.0
Bonaventure	Gaspésie–Îles-de-la-Madeleine	Bonaventure		2,733	2,706	+1.0%	104.5	26.2
Boucherville	Montérégie	Longueuil	Montréal	41,743	41,671	+0.2%	71.02	587.8
Bromont	Montérégie	Brome-Missisquoi	Granby	11,357	9,041	+25.6%	114.05	99.6
Brossard	Montérégie	Longueuil	Montréal	91,525	85,721	+6.8%	45.19	2,025.3
Brownsburg-Chatham	Laurentides	Argenteuil		7,247	7,122	+1.8%	244.46	29.6
Candiac	Montérégie	Roussillon	Montréal	22,997	21,047	+9.3%	17.27	1,331.6
Cap-Chat	Gaspésie–Îles-de-la-Madeleine	La Haute-Gaspésie		2,516	2,476	+1.6%	181.31	13.9
Cap-Santé	Capitale-Nationale	Portneuf		3,594	3,410	+5.4%	54.49	66.0
Carignan	Montérégie	La Vallée-du-Richelieu	Montréal	11,740	9,462	+24.1%	62.07	189.1
Carleton-sur-Mer	Gaspésie–Îles-de-la-Madeleine	Avignon		4,081	4,073	+0.2%	221.48	18.4
Causapscal	Bas-Saint-Laurent	La Matapédia		2,147	2,304	−6.8%	161.61	13.3
Chambly	Montérégie	La Vallée-du-Richelieu	Montréal	31,444	29,120	+8.0%	25.08	1,253.7
Chandler	Gaspésie–Îles-de-la-Madeleine	Le Rocher-Percé		7,490	7,546	−0.7%	418.45	17.9
Chapais	Nord-du-Québec	Jamésie		1,468	1,499	−2.1%	62.31	23.6
Charlemagne	Lanaudière	L'Assomption	Montréal	6,302	5,913	+6.6%	2.17	2,904.1
Châteauguay	Montérégie	Roussillon	Montréal	50,815	47,906	+6.1%	34.31	1,481.1
Château-Richer	Capitale-Nationale	La Côte-de-Beaupré	Québec	4,425	4,126	+7.2%	228.84	19.3
Chibougamau	Nord-du-Québec	Jamésie		7,233	7,504	−3.6%	694.87	10.4
Clermont	Capitale-Nationale	Charlevoix-Est		3,065	3,085	−0.6%	51.53	59.5
Coaticook	Estrie	Coaticook		8,867	8,955	−1.0%	219.45	40.4
Contrecoeur	Montérégie	Marguerite-D'Youville		9,480	7,887	+20.2%	62.2	152.4
Cookshire-Eaton	Estrie	Le Haut-Saint-François		5,344	5,393	−0.9%	296.25	18.0
Coteau-du-Lac	Montérégie	Vaudreuil-Soulanges	Montréal	7,473	7,044	+6.1%	46.87	159.4
Côte-Saint-Luc	Montréal	Montréal	Montréal	34,504	32,448	+6.3%	7.04	4,901.1
Cowansville	Montérégie	Brome-Missisquoi		15,234	13,656	+11.6%	46.87	325.0
Crabtree	Lanaudière	Joliette		4,155	3,958	+5.0%	25.06	165.8
Danville	Estrie	Les Sources		3,888	3,826	+1.6%	151.73	25.6
Daveluyville	Centre-du-Québec	Arthabaska		2,360	2,255	+4.7%	61.71	38.2
Dégelis	Bas-Saint-Laurent	Témiscouata		2,884	2,863	+0.7%	556.78	5.2
Delson	Montérégie	Roussillon	Montréal	8,328	7,457	+11.7%	7.64	1,090.1
Desbiens	Saguenay–Lac-Saint-Jean	Lac-Saint-Jean-Est		995	1,028	−3.2%	10.39	95.8
Deux-Montagnes	Laurentides	Deux-Montagnes	Montréal	17,915	17,496	+2.4%	6.08	2,946.5
Disraeli	Chaudière-Appalaches	Les Appalaches		2,360	2,336	+1.0%	6.8	347.1
Dolbeau-Mistassini	Saguenay–Lac-Saint-Jean	Maria-Chapdelaine	Dolbeau-Mistassini	13,718	14,212	−3.5%	293.43	46.8
Dollard-des-Ormeaux	Montréal	Montréal	Montréal	48,403	48,899	−1.0%	14.98	3,231.2
Donnacona	Capitale-Nationale	Portneuf		7,436	7,200	+3.3%	20.2	368.1
Dorval	Montréal	Montréal	Montréal	19,302	18,980	+1.7%	20.91	923.1
Drummondville	Centre-du-Québec	Drummond	Drummondville	79,258	75,423	+5.1%	247.11	320.7
Dunham	Montérégie	Brome-Missisquoi		3,599	3,432	+4.9%	193.86	18.6
Duparquet	Abitibi-Témiscamingue	Abitibi-Ouest		716	666	+7.5%	121.17	5.9
East Angus	Estrie	Le Haut-Saint-François		3,840	3,659	+4.9%	7.84	489.8
Estérel	Laurentides	Les Pays-d'en-Haut		262	196	+33.7%	12.62	20.8
Farnham	Montérégie	Brome-Missisquoi		10,149	8,909	+13.9%	92.12	110.2
Fermont	Côte-Nord	Caniapiscau		2,256	2,474	−8.8%	451.12	5.0
Forestville	Côte-Nord	La Haute-Côte-Nord		2,892	3,081	−6.1%	192.61	15.0
Fossambault-sur-le-Lac	Capitale-Nationale	La Jacques-Cartier	Québec	2,327	1,960	+18.7%	11.49	202.5
Gaspé	Gaspésie–Îles-de-la-Madeleine	La Côte-de-Gaspé		15,063	14,568	+3.4%	1,118.77	13.5
Gatineau	Outaouais	Gatineau	Ottawa–Gatineau	291,041	276,245	+5.4%	341.84	851.4
Gracefield	Outaouais	La Vallée-de-la-Gatineau		2,376	2,462	−3.5%	380.94	6.2
Granby	Montérégie	La Haute-Yamaska	Granby	69,025	66,222	+4.2%	152.69	452.1
Grande-Rivière	Gaspésie–Îles-de-la-Madeleine	Le Rocher-Percé		3,384	3,408	−0.7%	87.92	38.5
Hampstead	Montréal	Montréal	Montréal	7,037	6,973	+0.9%	1.79	3,931.3
Hudson	Montérégie	Vaudreuil-Soulanges	Montréal	5,411	5,157	+4.9%	21.79	248.3
Huntingdon	Montérégie	Le Haut-Saint-Laurent		2,556	2,444	+4.6%	2.77	922.7
Joliette	Lanaudière	Joliette	Joliette	21,384	20,484	+4.4%	22.96	931.4
Kingsey Falls	Centre-du-Québec	Arthabaska		1,986	1,947	+2.0%	69.36	28.6
Kirkland	Montréal	Montréal	Montréal	19,413	20,151	−3.7%	9.65	2,011.7
La Malbaie	Capitale-Nationale	Charlevoix-Est		8,235	8,271	−0.4%	458.19	18.0
La Pocatière	Bas-Saint-Laurent	Kamouraska		4,078	4,120	−1.0%	21.18	192.5
La Prairie	Montérégie	Roussillon	Montréal	26,406	24,110	+9.5%	43.47	607.5
La Sarre	Abitibi-Témiscamingue	Abitibi-Ouest		7,358	7,282	+1.0%	148.36	49.6
La Tuque (Note: La Tuque is Quebec's largest ville by area.)	Mauricie	La Tuque		11,129	11,001	+1.2%	24,809.4	0.4
Lac-Brome	Montérégie	Brome-Missisquoi		5,923	5,495	+7.8%	206.9	28.6
Lac-Delage	Capitale-Nationale	La Jacques-Cartier	Québec	771	638	+20.8%	1.58	488.0
Lac-des-Aigles	Bas-Saint-Laurent	Témiscouata		571	566	+0.9%	226.17	2.5
Lachute	Laurentides	Argenteuil		14,100	12,862	+9.6%	108.66	129.8
Lac-Mégantic	Estrie	Le Granit		5,747	5,654	+1.6%	21.98	261.5
Lac-Saint-Joseph	Capitale-Nationale	La Jacques-Cartier	Québec	304	260	+16.9%	33.65	9.0
Lac-Sergent	Capitale-Nationale	Portneuf		541	497	+8.9%	3.72	145.4
L'Ancienne-Lorette	Capitale-Nationale	Québec	Québec	16,970	16,543	+2.6%	7.72	2,198.2
L'Assomption	Lanaudière	L'Assomption	Montréal	23,442	22,429	+4.5%	98.74	237.4
Laval	Laval	Laval	Montréal	438,366	422,993	+3.6%	246.13	1,781.0
Lavaltrie	Lanaudière	D'Autray	Montréal	14,425	13,657	+5.6%	68.22	211.4
Lebel-sur-Quévillon	Nord-du-Québec	Jamésie		2,091	2,187	−4.4%	44.41	47.1
L'Épiphanie	Lanaudière	L'Assomption	Montréal	8,883	8,693	+2.2%	56.57	157.0
Léry	Montérégie	Roussillon	Montréal	2,390	2,318	+3.1%	10.36	230.7
Lévis	Chaudière-Appalaches	Lévis	Québec	149,683	143,414	+4.4%	448.07	334.1
L'Île-Cadieux	Montérégie	Vaudreuil-Soulanges	Montréal	120	126	−4.8%	0.59	203.4
L'Île-Dorval (Note: L'Île-Dorval is Quebec's smallest ville by both population and area.)	Montréal	Montréal	Montréal	30	5	+500.0%	0.19	157.9
L'Île-Perrot	Montérégie	Vaudreuil-Soulanges	Montréal	11,638	10,756	+8.2%	5.46	2,131.5
Longueuil	Montérégie	Longueuil	Montréal	254,483	239,897	+6.1%	115.77	2,198.2
Lorraine	Laurentides	Thérèse-De Blainville	Montréal	9,502	9,352	+1.6%	5.9	1,610.5
Louiseville	Mauricie	Maskinongé		7,340	7,152	+2.6%	62.59	117.3
Macamic	Abitibi-Témiscamingue	Abitibi-Ouest		2,744	2,751	−0.3%	202.05	13.6
Magog	Estrie	Memphrémagog	Sherbrooke	28,312	26,669	+6.2%	144.26	196.3
Malartic	Abitibi-Témiscamingue	La Vallée-de-l'Or		3,355	3,377	−0.7%	147.45	22.8
Maniwaki	Outaouais	La Vallée-de-la-Gatineau		3,757	3,843	−2.2%	5.67	662.6
Marieville	Montérégie	Rouville		11,332	10,725	+5.7%	63.23	179.2
Mascouche	Lanaudière	Les Moulins	Montréal	51,183	46,692	+9.6%	106.89	478.8
Matagami	Nord-du-Québec	Jamésie		1,402	1,453	−3.5%	75.12	18.7
Matane	Bas-Saint-Laurent	La Matanie	Matane	13,987	14,311	−2.3%	195.49	71.5
McMasterville	Montérégie	La Vallée-du-Richelieu	Montréal	5,936	5,698	+4.2%	3.12	1,902.6
Mercier	Montérégie	Roussillon	Montréal	14,626	13,115	+11.5%	45.96	318.2
Métabetchouan--Lac-à-la-Croix	Saguenay–Lac-Saint-Jean	Lac-Saint-Jean-Est		4,121	3,985	+3.4%	187.49	22.0
Métis-sur-Mer	Bas-Saint-Laurent	La Mitis		594	572	+3.8%	48.22	12.3
Mirabel	Laurentides	Mirabel	Montréal	61,108	50,513	+21.0%	484.09	126.2
Mont-Joli	Bas-Saint-Laurent	La Mitis		6,384	6,281	+1.6%	24.24	263.4
Mont-Laurier	Laurentides	Antoine-Labelle		14,180	14,116	+0.5%	587.42	24.1
Montmagny	Chaudière-Appalaches	Montmagny		10,999	11,255	−2.3%	124.44	88.4
Montréal (Note: Montreal is Canada's second-largest ville and Quebec's largest ville by population.)	Montréal	Montréal	Montréal	1,762,949	1,704,694	+3.4%	364.74	4,833.4
Montréal-Est	Montréal	Montréal	Montréal	4,394	3,850	+14.1%	12.15	361.6
Montréal-Ouest	Montréal	Montréal	Montréal	5,115	5,050	+1.3%	1.37	3,733.6
Mont-Royal	Montréal	Montréal	Montréal	20,953	20,276	+3.3%	7.55	2,775.2
Mont-Saint-Hilaire	Montérégie	La Vallée-du-Richelieu	Montréal	18,859	18,585	+1.5%	44.08	427.8
Mont-Tremblant	Laurentides	Les Laurentides		10,992	9,646	+14.0%	233.75	47.0
Murdochville	Gaspésie–Îles-de-la-Madeleine	La Côte-de-Gaspé		643	651	−1.2%	60.84	10.6
Neuville	Capitale-Nationale	Portneuf	Québec	4,475	4,392	+1.9%	71.92	62.2
New Richmond	Gaspésie–Îles-de-la-Madeleine	Bonaventure		3,683	3,706	−0.6%	172.5	21.4
Nicolet	Centre-du-Québec	Nicolet-Yamaska		8,620	8,169	+5.5%	96.11	89.7
Normandin	Saguenay–Lac-Saint-Jean	Maria-Chapdelaine		2,991	3,033	−1.4%	211.79	14.1
Notre-Dame-de-l'Île-Perrot	Montérégie	Vaudreuil-Soulanges	Montréal	11,427	10,654	+7.3%	28.06	407.2
Notre-Dame-des-Prairies	Lanaudière	Joliette	Joliette	9,471	9,273	+2.1%	18.1	523.3
Otterburn Park	Montérégie	La Vallée-du-Richelieu	Montréal	8,479	8,421	+0.7%	5.37	1,579.0
Paspébiac	Gaspésie–Îles-de-la-Madeleine	Bonaventure		3,033	3,164	−4.1%	94.98	31.9
Percé	Gaspésie–Îles-de-la-Madeleine	Le Rocher-Percé		3,095	3,103	−0.3%	432.81	7.2
Pincourt	Montérégie	Vaudreuil-Soulanges	Montréal	14,751	14,558	+1.3%	7.1	2,077.6
Plessisville	Centre-du-Québec	L'Érable		9,069	9,214	−1.6%	146.11	62.1
Pohénégamook	Bas-Saint-Laurent	Témiscouata		2,481	2,582	−3.9%	339.99	7.3
Pointe-Claire	Montréal	Montréal	Montréal	33,488	31,380	+6.7%	18.91	1,770.9
Pont-Rouge	Capitale-Nationale	Portneuf		10,121	9,240	+9.5%	121.12	83.6
Port-Cartier	Côte-Nord	Sept-Rivières		6,516	6,799	−4.2%	1,092.75	6.0
Portneuf	Capitale-Nationale	Portneuf		3,329	3,187	+4.5%	109.1	30.5
Prévost	Laurentides	La Rivière-du-Nord		13,692	13,002	+5.3%	34.29	399.3
Princeville	Centre-du-Québec	L'Érable		6,218	6,001	+3.6%	195.01	31.9
Québec (Note: Quebec City is Quebec's capital.)	Capitale-Nationale	Québec	Québec	549,459	531,902	+3.3%	452.3	1,214.8
Repentigny	Lanaudière	L'Assomption	Montréal	86,100	84,285	+2.2%	61.52	1,399.5
Richelieu	Montérégie	Rouville	Montréal	5,742	5,236	+9.7%	30.96	185.5
Richmond	Estrie	Le Val-Saint-François		3,259	3,232	+0.8%	6.98	466.9
Rigaud	Montérégie	Vaudreuil-Soulanges		7,854	7,777	+1.0%	99.2	79.2
Rimouski	Bas-Saint-Laurent	Rimouski-Neigette	Rimouski	48,935	48,664	+0.6%	339.13	144.3
Rivière-du-Loup	Bas-Saint-Laurent	Rivière-du-Loup	Rivière-du-Loup	20,118	19,507	+3.1%	83.74	240.2
Rivière-Rouge	Laurentides	Antoine-Labelle		4,631	4,322	+7.1%	451.43	10.3
Roberval	Saguenay–Lac-Saint-Jean	Le Domaine-du-Roy		9,840	10,046	−2.1%	151.36	65.0
Rosemère	Laurentides	Thérèse-De Blainville	Montréal	14,090	13,958	+0.9%	10.68	1,319.3
Rouyn-Noranda	Abitibi-Témiscamingue	Rouyn-Noranda		42,313	42,334	0.0%	5,963.57	7.1
Saguenay	Saguenay–Lac-Saint-Jean	Saguenay	Saguenay	144,723	145,949	−0.8%	1,124.63	128.7
Saint-Amable	Montérégie	Marguerite-D'Youville	Montréal	13,322	12,167	+9.5%	36.77	362.3
Saint-Antonin	Bas-Saint-Laurent	Rivière-du-Loup	Rivière-du-Loup	4,338	4,049	+7.1%	175.93	24.7
Saint-Augustin-de-Desmaures	Capitale-Nationale	Québec	Québec	19,907	18,820	+5.8%	85.8	232.0
Saint-Basile	Capitale-Nationale	Portneuf		2,709	2,621	+3.4%	98.84	27.4
Saint-Basile-le-Grand	Montérégie	La Vallée-du-Richelieu	Montréal	17,053	17,059	0.0%	35.84	475.8
Saint-Bruno-de-Montarville	Montérégie	Longueuil	Montréal	26,273	26,197	+0.3%	42.85	613.1
Saint-Césaire	Montérégie	Rouville		5,972	5,877	+1.6%	83.06	71.9
Saint-Charles-Borromée	Lanaudière	Joliette	Joliette	15,285	13,791	+10.8%	18.48	827.1
Saint-Colomban	Laurentides	La Rivière-du-Nord	Montréal	17,740	16,019	+10.7%	92.71	191.3
Saint-Constant	Montérégie	Roussillon	Montréal	29,954	27,359	+9.5%	57.06	525.0
Sainte-Adèle	Laurentides	Les Pays-d'en-Haut		14,010	12,919	+8.4%	119.67	117.1
Sainte-Agathe-des-Monts	Laurentides	Les Laurentides	Sainte-Agathe-des-Monts	11,211	10,223	+9.7%	129.1	86.8
Sainte-Anne-de-Beaupré	Capitale-Nationale	La Côte-de-Beaupré		2,888	2,880	+0.3%	62.38	46.3
Sainte-Anne-de-Bellevue	Montréal	Montréal	Montréal	5,027	4,958	+1.4%	10.46	480.6
Sainte-Anne-des-Monts	Gaspésie–Îles-de-la-Madeleine	La Haute-Gaspésie		6,121	6,437	−4.9%	263.51	23.2
Sainte-Anne-des-Plaines	Laurentides	Thérèse-De Blainville	Montréal	15,221	14,421	+5.5%	93.44	162.9
Sainte-Brigitte-de-Laval	Capitale-Nationale	La Jacques-Cartier	Québec	8,468	7,348	+15.2%	108.42	78.1
Sainte-Catherine	Montérégie	Roussillon	Montréal	17,347	17,047	+1.8%	9.37	1,851.3
Sainte-Catherine-de-la-Jacques-Cartier	Capitale-Nationale	La Jacques-Cartier	Québec	8,442	7,706	+9.6%	120.7	69.9
Sainte-Julie	Montérégie	Marguerite-D'Youville	Montréal	30,045	29,881	+0.5%	48.49	619.6
Sainte-Marguerite-du-Lac-Masson	Laurentides	Les Pays-d'en-Haut		3,367	2,763	+21.9%	91.56	36.8
Sainte-Marie	Chaudière-Appalaches	La Nouvelle-Beauce		13,134	13,565	−3.2%	107.55	122.1
Sainte-Marthe-sur-le-Lac	Laurentides	Deux-Montagnes	Montréal	19,797	18,074	+9.5%	8.73	2,267.7
Sainte-Thérèse	Laurentides	Thérèse-De Blainville	Montréal	26,533	25,989	+2.1%	9.48	2,798.8
Saint-Eustache	Laurentides	Deux-Montagnes	Montréal	45,276	44,008	+2.9%	70.51	642.1
Saint-Félicien	Saguenay–Lac-Saint-Jean	Le Domaine-du-Roy		10,089	10,238	−1.5%	361.27	27.9
Saint-Gabriel	Lanaudière	D'Autray		2,803	2,640	+6.2%	2.81	997.5
Saint-Georges	Chaudière-Appalaches	Beauce-Sartigan	Saint-Georges	32,935	32,513	+1.3%	199.08	165.4
Saint-Honoré	Saguenay–Lac-Saint-Jean	Le Fjord-du-Saguenay	Saguenay	6,376	5,757	+10.8%	189.38	33.7
Saint-Hyacinthe	Montérégie	Les Maskoutains	Saint-Hyacinthe	57,239	55,648	+2.9%	188.85	303.1
Saint-Jean-sur-Richelieu	Montérégie	Le Haut-Richelieu	Montréal	97,873	95,114	+2.9%	226.93	431.3
Saint-Jérôme	Laurentides	La Rivière-du-Nord	Montréal	80,213	74,346	+7.9%	90.18	889.5
Saint-Joseph-de-Beauce	Chaudière-Appalaches	Beauce-Centre		5,014	4,858	+3.2%	114.7	43.7
Saint-Joseph-de-Sorel	Montérégie	Pierre-De Saurel	Sorel-Tracy	1,581	1,642	−3.7%	1.36	1,162.5
Saint-Lambert	Montérégie	Longueuil	Montréal	22,761	21,861	+4.1%	7.56	3,010.7
Saint-Lazare	Montérégie	Vaudreuil-Soulanges	Montréal	22,354	19,917	+12.2%	66.86	334.3
Saint-Lin--Laurentides	Lanaudière	Montcalm	Montréal	24,030	20,786	+15.6%	118.29	203.1
Saint-Marc-des-Carrières	Capitale-Nationale	Portneuf		2,901	2,911	−0.3%	17.29	167.8
Saint-Ours	Montérégie	Pierre-De Saurel		1,723	1,669	+3.2%	59.23	29.1
Saint-Pamphile	Chaudière-Appalaches	L'Islet		2,274	2,400	−5.2%	137.78	16.5
Saint-Pascal	Bas-Saint-Laurent	Kamouraska		3,530	3,468	+1.8%	59.68	59.1
Saint-Philippe	Montérégie	Roussillon	Montréal	7,597	6,320	+20.2%	61.96	122.6
Saint-Pie	Montérégie	Les Maskoutains		5,847	5,607	+4.3%	107.42	54.4
Saint-Raymond	Capitale-Nationale	Portneuf		11,108	10,358	+7.2%	666.2	16.7
Saint-Rémi	Montérégie	Les Jardins-de-Napierville		8,957	8,061	+11.1%	78.18	114.6
Saint-Sauveur	Laurentides	Les Pays-d'en-Haut		11,580	10,231	+13.2%	47.62	243.2
Saint-Tite	Mauricie	Mékinac		3,672	3,673	0.0%	91.1	40.3
Saint-Zotique	Montérégie	Vaudreuil-Soulanges	Montréal	9,618	7,934	+21.2%	25.04	384.1
Salaberry-de-Valleyfield	Montérégie	Beauharnois-Salaberry		42,787	40,745	+5.0%	108.56	394.1
Schefferville	Côte-Nord	Caniapiscau		244	130	+87.7%	24.76	9.9
Scotstown	Estrie	Le Haut-Saint-François		459	472	−2.8%	11.44	40.1
Senneterre	Abitibi-Témiscamingue	La Vallée-de-l'Or		2,782	2,868	−3.0%	14,718.51	0.2
Sept-Îles	Côte-Nord	Sept-Rivières	Sept-Îles	24,569	25,400	−3.3%	1,742.88	14.1
Shannon	Capitale-Nationale	La Jacques-Cartier	Québec	6,432	6,031	+6.6%	63.54	101.2
Shawinigan	Mauricie	Shawinigan		49,620	49,349	+0.5%	729.98	68.0
Sherbrooke	Estrie	Sherbrooke	Sherbrooke	172,950	161,323	+7.2%	353.4	489.4
Sorel-Tracy	Montérégie	Pierre-De Saurel	Sorel-Tracy	35,165	34,755	+1.2%	57.28	613.9
Stanstead	Estrie	Memphrémagog		2,824	2,788	+1.3%	21.95	128.7
Sutton	Montérégie	Brome-Missisquoi		4,548	4,012	+13.4%	245.69	18.5
Témiscaming	Abitibi-Témiscamingue	Témiscamingue		2,368	2,431	−2.6%	710.84	3.3
Témiscouata-sur-le-Lac	Bas-Saint-Laurent	Témiscouata		5,054	4,910	+2.9%	218.81	23.1
Terrebonne	Lanaudière	Les Moulins	Montréal	119,944	111,575	+7.5%	153.76	780.1
Thetford Mines	Chaudière-Appalaches	Les Appalaches	Thetford Mines	26,072	25,403	+2.6%	225.97	115.4
Thurso	Outaouais	Papineau	Ottawa–Gatineau	3,084	2,818	+9.4%	6.65	463.8
Trois-Pistoles	Bas-Saint-Laurent	Les Basques		3,115	3,246	−4.0%	7.63	408.3
Trois-Rivières	Mauricie	Trois-Rivières	Trois-Rivières	139,163	134,413	+3.5%	288.65	482.1
Valcourt	Estrie	Le Val-Saint-François		2,139	2,165	−1.2%	5.41	395.4
Val-des-Sources	Estrie	Les Sources		7,088	6,786	+4.5%	30.25	234.3
Val-d'Or	Abitibi-Témiscamingue	La Vallée-de-l'Or	Val-d'Or	32,752	32,491	+0.8%	3,536.84	9.3
Varennes	Montérégie	Marguerite-D'Youville	Montréal	21,198	21,257	−0.3%	94.8	223.6
Vaudreuil-Dorion	Montérégie	Vaudreuil-Soulanges	Montréal	43,268	38,117	+13.5%	72.65	595.6
Victoriaville	Centre-du-Québec	Arthabaska	Victoriaville	47,760	46,130	+3.5%	84.33	566.3
Ville-Marie	Abitibi-Témiscamingue	Témiscamingue		2,464	2,584	−4.6%	5.83	422.6
Warwick	Centre-du-Québec	Arthabaska		4,729	4,635	+2.0%	109.6	43.1
Waterloo	Montérégie	La Haute-Yamaska		4,920	4,410	+11.6%	12.23	402.3
Waterville	Estrie	Coaticook	Sherbrooke	2,307	2,121	+8.8%	44.03	52.4
Westmount	Montréal	Montréal	Montréal	19,658	20,312	−3.2%	4.04	4,865.8
Windsor	Estrie	Le Val-Saint-François		5,294	5,419	−2.3%	14.53	364.3
Total cities	—	—	—	7,166,179	6,884,364	+4.1%	82,006.65	87.4
