= Saint-Joseph Lake =

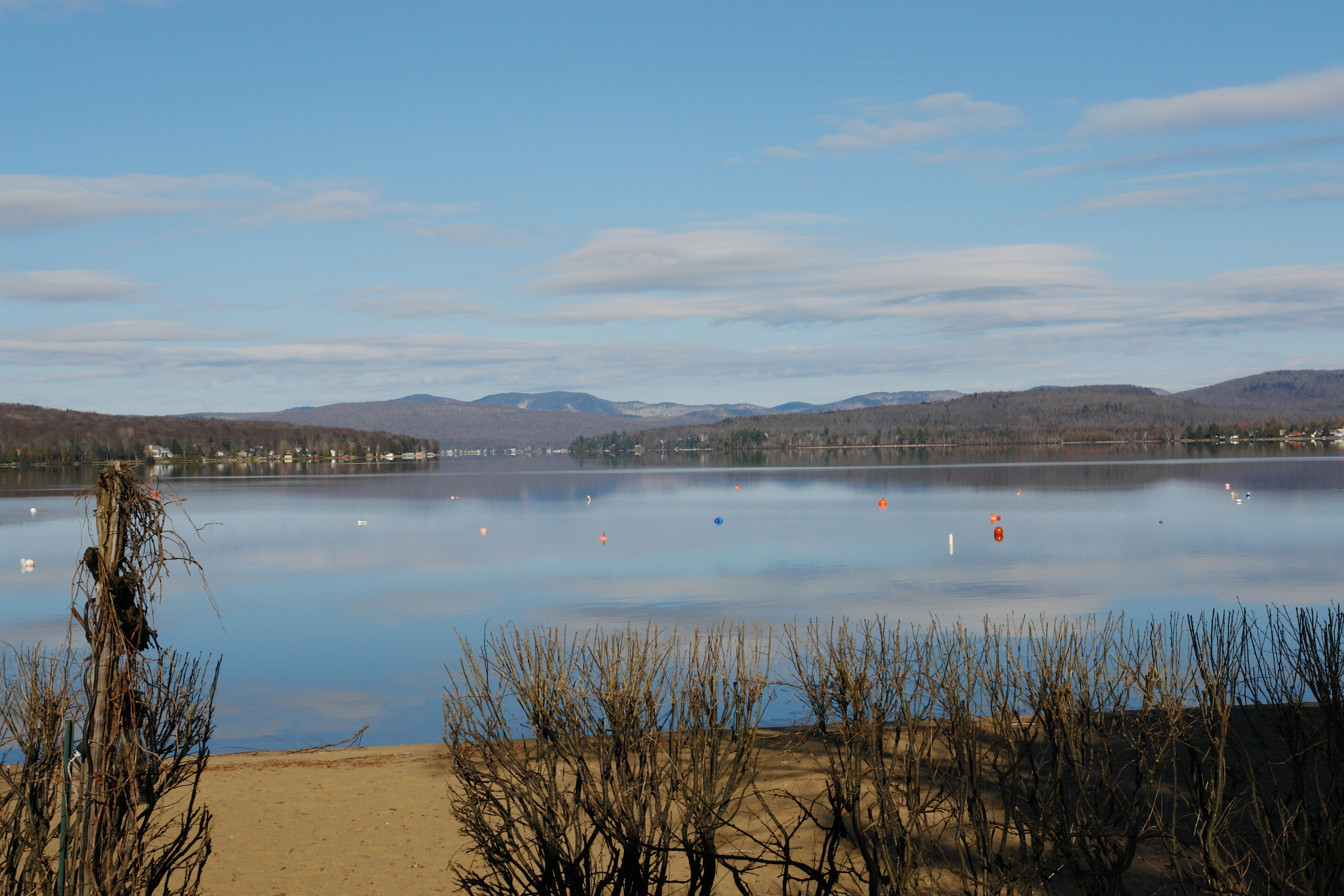

- Location in Quebec
- Location: Lac-Saint-Joseph (TNO), La Jacques-Cartier Regional County Municipality, Capitale-Nationale, Quebec
- Coordinates: 46.91389°N 71.64417°W
- Lake type: Lake of dam
- Primary inflows: Rivière aux Pins, ruisseau Le François
- Primary outflows: Ontaritzi River
- Basin countries: Canada
- Max. length: 8.1 km (5.0 mi)
- Max. width: 2.33 km (1.45 mi)
- Surface area: 11.31 km^{2} (4.37 sq mi)
- Max. depth: 37 m (121 ft)
- Surface elevation: 159 m (522 ft)
- Islands: 1

Saint-Joseph Lake (French: Lac Saint-Joseph, pronounced [lak sɛ̃ ʒozɛf]) is a freshwater body located in the La Jacques-Cartier Regional County Municipality, in the administrative region of Capitale-Nationale, in the province of Quebec, Canada.

Recreational and tourist activities, especially vacationing, are the main economic activity around the lake; forestry, second. The shores all around Lake Saint-Joseph are highly renowned for vacationing, particularly because of the forest, mountain environment, recreational tourism, road access, proximity to the city of Quebec and especially the Duchesnay tourist resort which surrounds Lake Saint-Joseph three-quarters (west, north and east).

Chemin Thomas-Maher goes around the lake for the purposes of recreational tourism and forestry.

The surface of Lake Saint-Joseph is generally frozen from the beginning of December to the end of March; safe circulation on the ice is generally done from the end of December to the beginning of March.

== Geography ==
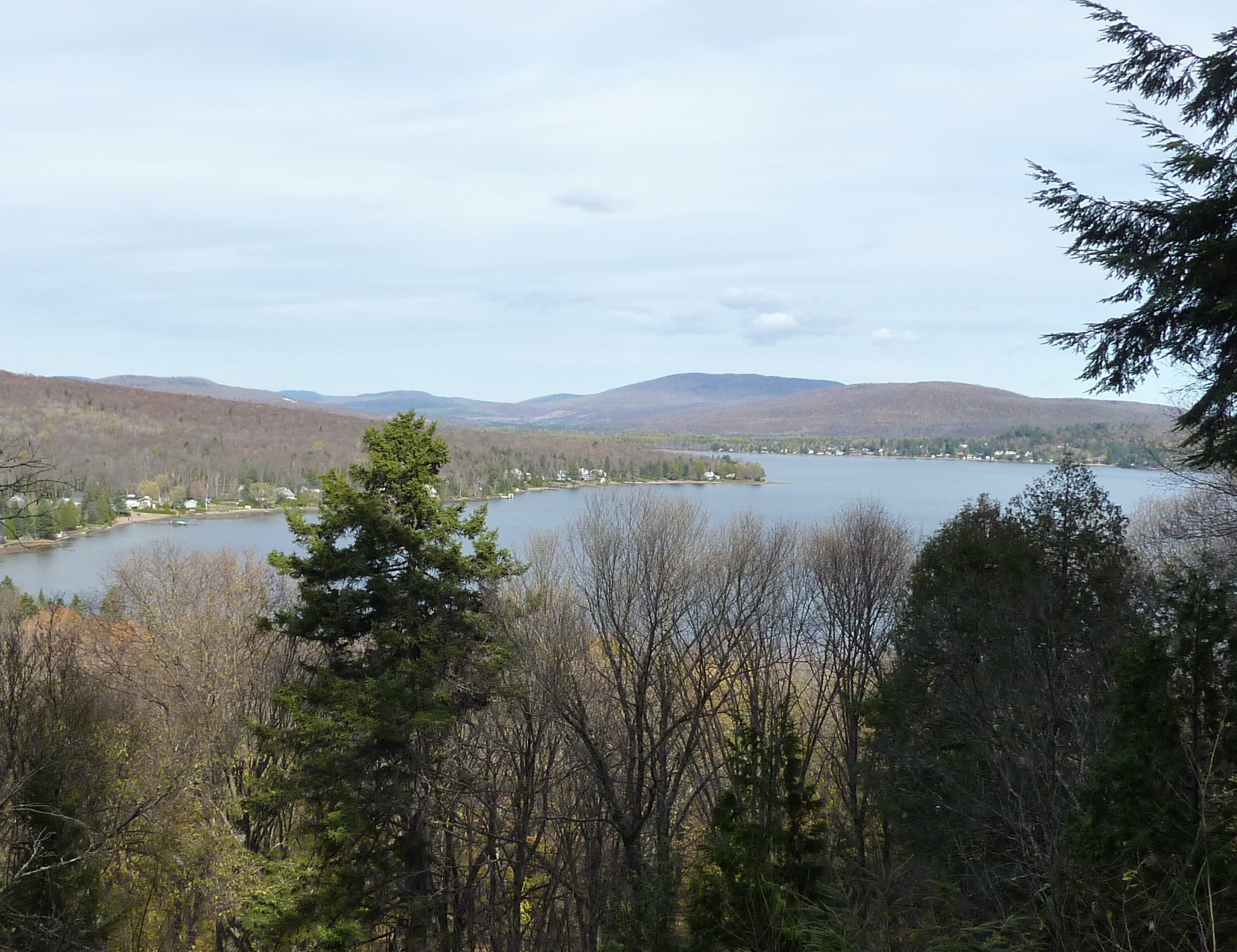
Southern part of the lake (view looking north).

Lac Saint-Joseph is 8.1 km long (in the north–south direction) and has an area of 11.31 km^{2}. Its circumference is 22.4 km.

This lake of glacial origin is located about thirty kilometers west-northwest of the city Quebec. The hydrographic slope of Lac Saint-Joseph is located between that of the Sainte-Anne River (Mauricie) (located 9.2 km (5.7 mi) northwest of the northern part) and the Jacques-Cartier River (located 2.25 km (1.40 mi) southeast of the southern part of the lake). The lake narrows in its center, like a peanut shell. The area of the northern part of Lac Saint-Joseph is more dominant than the southern part. In addition to some streams that are tributaries, Lake Saint-Joseph is fed by:

- the rivière aux Pins (on the east side of the lake) which drains many streams, the rivière de la Somme, the “petite rivière aux Pins” as well as Lake Belle Truite, Lakes Tantaré, Cesena, Regio and Lac des Pins River. These bodies of water and watercourses are part of the territory of the Canadian Forces Base Valcartier;
- Le François stream (north-west of the lake) which feeds on three small mountain lakes including Lac Le François (257 m above sea level).

Course on the Ontaritzi River At 159 m above sea level, the waters of Lake Saint-Joseph are retained by the Duchesnay dam, erected at the mouth in the territory of Sainte-Catherine-de-la-Jacques-Cartier. The waters flow into the Ontaritzi river (4.5 km (2.8 mi) long, measured by the current) which flows a priori from the dam for 600 m to the west, passing:

- under the bridge of the Jacques-Cartier cycle path, which is designated no. 6 of the "Green Route" since 2007;
- under the bridge of route 367; and
- in front of the Duchesnay forestry school, the building of which was inaugurated in 2001.

Then the river turns south-east to flow for 2.1 km (1.3 mi). From there, the river crosses the Laroche Rapids, heading south. Finally, it flows into the Jacques-Cartier River, bypassing the Île à Prévost located at the mouth, opposite the village of Sainte-Catherine-de-la-Jacques-Cartier. The Ontaritzi River flows entirely into the territory of Sainte-Catherine-de-la-Jacques-Cartier.

Municipal administration Most of the lake (west, north and east) is administered under the aegis of the city municipality of Lac-Saint-Joseph. Founded in 1949, the municipality of Fossambault-sur-le-Lac administers the area southeast of Lac Saint-Joseph. The municipality of Sainte-Catherine-de-la-Jacques-Cartier administers only the area near the mouth. The lake has several hamlets around: the hamlet Duchesnay is located southwest of the lake (in the dam area); the hamlet Lake View, on the southeast side; the hamlet Lac-Saint-Joseph, to the west. Formerly, the railway of the Canadian National (initially, the "National Transcontinental Railway") passed south of the village of Fossambault-sur-le-Lac and descends the Ontaritzi River, downstream from the Duchesnay dam.

The road which bypasses the lake is designated "Chemin Thomas-Maher" in the town territory of Lac-Saint-Joseph; then "route Duchesnay" for the segment in the hamlet Duchesnay and "route de Fossambault" in the territory of Fossambault-sur-le-Lac.

== Toponymy ==
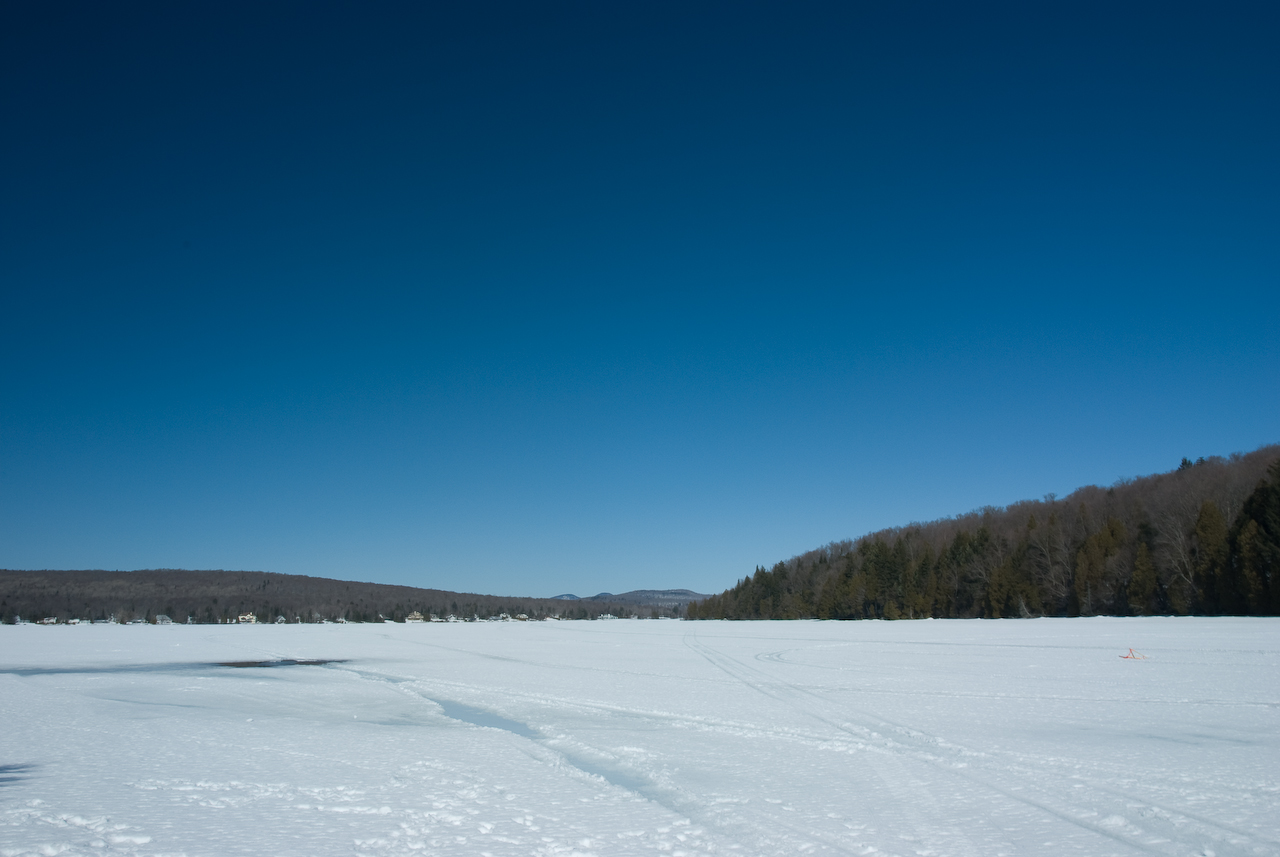
The lake in winter

This toponym is indicated in legend on the map designed in 1632 by Samuel de Champlain; however, he erroneously indicates the source of the Saint-Charles River. In his work "Histoire du Canada" published in 1636, Recollect brother Gabriel Sagard writes: "They go hunting (the season being good) towards Lake Sainct Joseph, where they made a profit at the expense of the caribouts, explores e other bestes which are in abundance. This lake of Sainct Joseph, of great extent, was so named by the François because the P. Joseph, Superior of our House, had spent part of a hyver with the Barbarians there".

The toponym "Lac Saint-Joseph" appears in 1656 on the map of Nicolas Sanson d'Abbeville under the script "L. St Joseph". At the beginning of XIXth, the Amerindian designation of this lake was "Ontarietsi" or "Ontaritzi". In 1833, the Gazette de Québec used the name "Lontarizé". At that time, about thirty Irish families who arrived in 1817 from Connecticut, occupied the current area southeast of the lake, designated Fossambault-sur-le-Lac. Lac St-Joseph was also named "Grand Lac des Vents". The toponym "Lac Saint-Joseph" was officially recognized in 1912.

The toponym "Lac Saint-Joseph" was formalized on December 5, 1968, at the Place Names Bank of the Commission de toponymie du Québec.
