= Ontaritzi River =

- Location within Quebec

Location
- Country: Canada
- Province: Quebec
- Region: Capitale-Nationale
- Regional County Municipality: La Jacques-Cartier Regional County Municipality

Physical characteristics
- Source: Saint-Joseph Lake
  - location: Sainte-Catherine-de-la-Jacques-Cartier
  - coordinates: 46°52′04″N 71°38′12″W
  - elevation: 158
- Mouth: Jacques-Cartier River
  - location: Sainte-Catherine-de-la-Jacques-Cartier
  - coordinates: 47°38′16″N 71°37′26″W
  - elevation: 143 m
- Length: 4.8 km (3.0 mi)

Basin features
- Tributaries
  - right: (Upward from the mouth) Unidentified stream, discharge from an unidentified lake, discharge from Yellow Lake.

The Rivière Ontaritzi is a tributary of the Jacques-Cartier River, flowing in the municipality of Sainte-Catherine-de-la-Jacques-Cartier, in the La Jacques-Cartier Regional County Municipality, in the administrative region of Capitale-Nationale, in Quebec, Canada.

The Ontaritzi river valley is mainly served on the north side by the Duchesnay road.

The economy of this area is mainly residential and resort; forestry is the main economic activity in the sector on the south and west side. Located to the northwest of the city of Quebec, Saint-Joseph Lake is a very popular site for recreational tourism activities including the resort.

The surface of the Ontaritzi River (except the rapids areas) is generally frozen from the beginning of December to the end of March; safe circulation on the ice is generally done from the end of December to the beginning of March. The water level of the river varies with the seasons and the precipitation.

== Geography ==
The main watersheds adjacent to the Ontaritzi River are:

- north side: Saint-Joseph Lake, Rivière aux Pins;
- east side: Jacques-Cartier River;
- south side: Jacques-Cartier river, Saint-Laurent river;
- west side: Sergent Lake, Sainte-Anne River.

From the Duchesnay dam located at the mouth of Lac Saint-Joseph the course of the river descends over 4.8 kilometres (3.0 mi) according to the following segments:

- 0.3 kilometres (0.19 mi) south-west to the road bridge at route 367;
- 0.4 kilometres (0.25 mi) by forming a loop towards the west, until the confluence of two streams (coming from the west);
- 3.6 kilometres (2.2 mi) to the east, more or less along route 367 which turns out to be a residential area and forming a 200 m hook. west, then south, to a stream (coming from the west). Note: this segment of river bypasses a mountain whose summit reaches 230 metres (750 ft);
- 0.5 kilometres (0.31 mi) to the east by cutting a road, to its mouth.

The Ontaritzi River flows on the northwest bank of the Jacques-Cartier River. From this confluence, the current descends on 15.4 kilometres (9.6 mi) generally towards the south following the course of the Jacques-Cartier River which flows on the northwest bank of the Saint-Laurent river .

== Toponymy ==
In 1976, the Association of Ontaritzi Residents, wishing to revive the denomination formerly used by the Wendats (Hurons), asked that the name Décharge du Lac Saint-Joseph or Rivière Duchesnay be changed to that of Rivière Ontaritzi, which was done. Originally, the name Ontaritzi applied more to the lake than to its discharge.

The plan of Nicolas Vincent, Wendat chief of Lorette, drawn up in 1829, attributes to this lake the name Ontaritai. In the Lovell Directory of British North America from 1873, Lake Ontaritzi or St. Joseph is indicated. Several hypotheses have been put forward on the meaning of this toponym: "lake of high winds", "pass a lake", from ontaretse or antaritaie, or "where it is hot", from otarixhein.

The toponym Ontaritzi river was formalized on October 2, 1980 at the Place Names Bank of the Commission de toponymie du Québec.

== See also ==
- Sainte-Catherine-de-la-Jacques-Cartier, a municipality
- La Jacques-Cartier Regional County Municipality
- Rivière aux Pins
- Jacques-Cartier River
- Saint-Joseph Lake, a body of water
- List of rivers of Quebec
