= Lac-Saint-Joseph =

- City
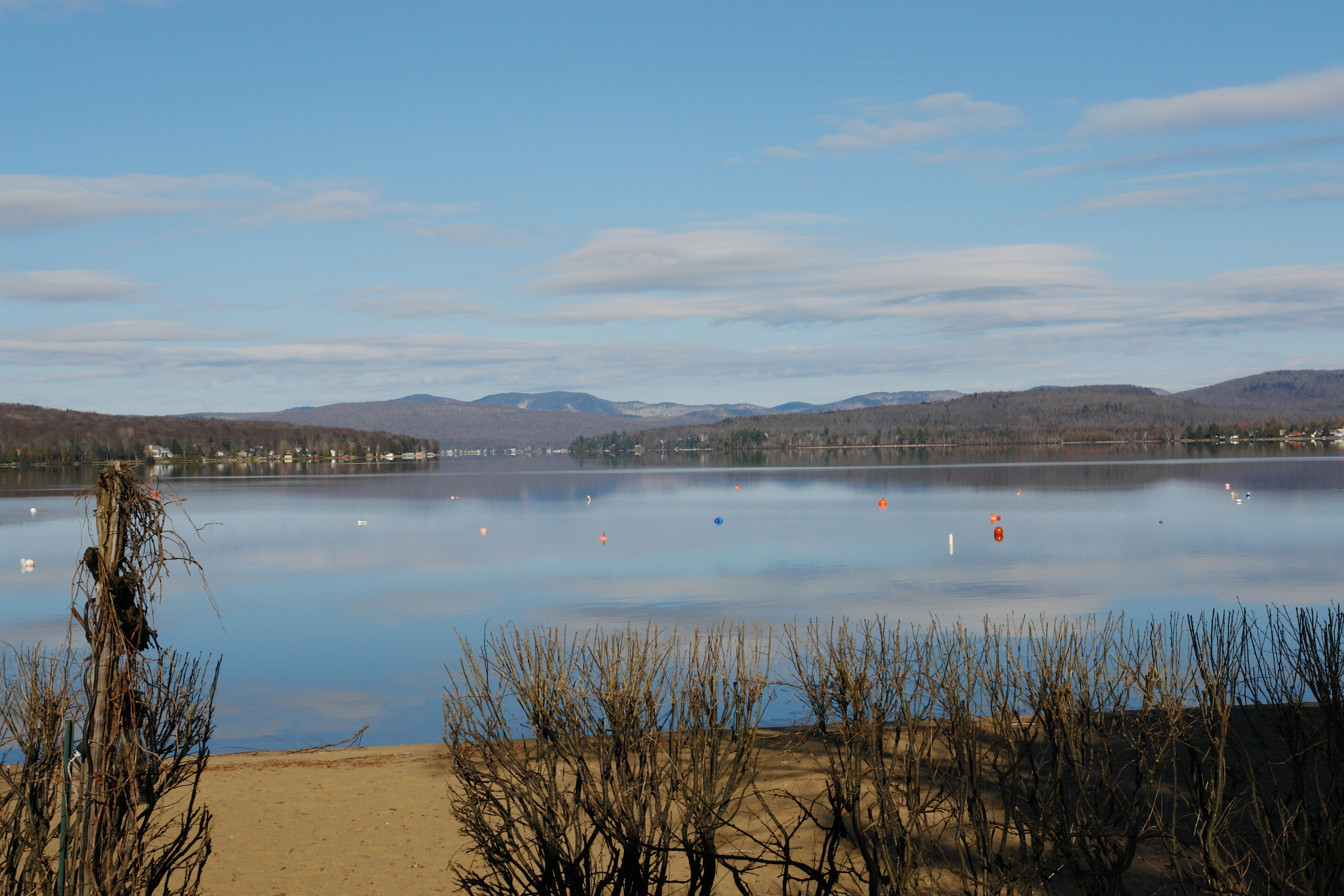
- Motto: Environnement Protégerai
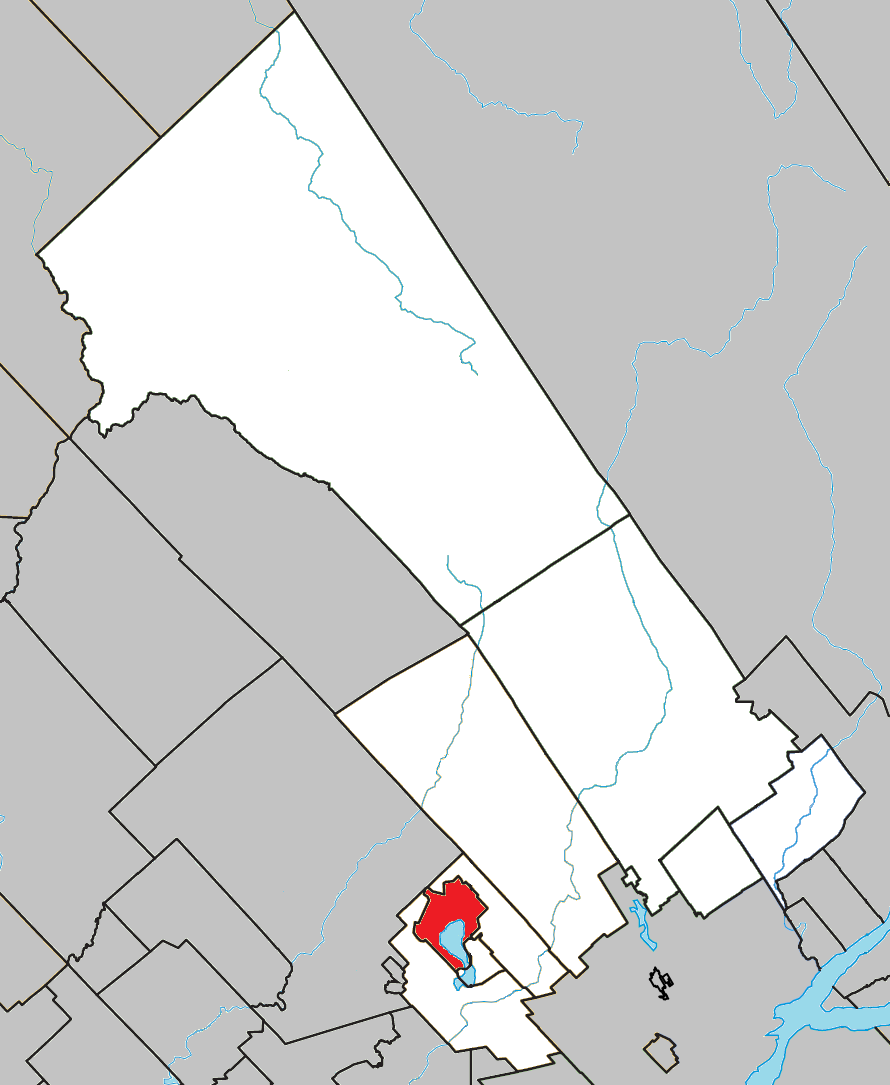
- Location within La Jacques-Cartier RCM

- Location in central Quebec
- Coordinates: 46°55′N 71°39′W
- Country: Canada
- Province: Quebec
- Region: Capitale-Nationale
- RCM: La Jacques-Cartier
- Constituted: June 10, 1936

Government
  - Mayor: Yvan Côté
  - Fed. riding: Saint-Augustin—Portneuf—Jacques-Cartier
  - Prov. riding: Portneuf

Area
  - Total: 42.28 km^{2} (16.32 sq mi)
  - Land: 33.65 km^{2} (12.99 sq mi)

Population (2021)
  - Total: 304
  - Density: 9/km^{2} (23/sq mi)
  - Pop (2016-21): ▲16.9%
  - Dwellings: 334
- Time zone: UTC−5 (EST)
  - Summer (DST): UTC−4 (EDT)
- Postal code(s): G3N 0B4
- Area codes: 418, 581
- Highways: No major routes
- Website: villelacstjoseph.com

Lac-Saint-Joseph (French pronunciation: [lak sɛ̃ ʒozɛf]) is a town in Quebec, Canada, located on the namesake Saint-Joseph Lake.

== History ==
Saint-Joseph Lake was already shown and named on Champlain's map of 1632 and Sanson's map of 1656.

Initially a summer resort for residents from Quebec City, its post office opened in 1906 under the name Lake St. Joseph Hotel, renamed to Lac-Saint-Joseph in 1927. Real development of the town began when industrialist Thomas Maher obtained a land concession for logging and built a sawmill. Maher, one of the first residents, sold all the waterfront lots in the 1940s.

In 1936, the City of Lac-Saint-Joseph was created out of territory ceded by the Parish Municipality of Sainte-Catherine.

== Demographics ==
In the 2021 Census of Population conducted by Statistics Canada, Lac-Saint-Joseph had a population of 304 living in 167 of its 334 total private dwellings, a change of 16.9% from its 2016 population of 260. With a land area of 33.65 km^{2} (12.99 sq mi), it had a population density of 9.0/km^{2} (23.4/sq mi) in 2021.

Historical census populations – Lac-Saint-Joseph

Year	Pop.	±%
1941	13	—
1951	16	+23.1%
1956	1	−93.8%
1961	6	+500.0%
1966	3	−50.0%
1971	7	+133.3%

Year	Pop.	±%
1976	16	+128.6%
1981	75	+368.8%
1986	68	−9.3%
1991	140	+105.9%
1996	83	−40.7%
2001	184	+121.7%

Year	Pop.	±%
2006	266	+44.6%
2011	251	−5.6%
2016	260	+3.6%
2021	304	+16.9%

Source: Statistics Canada

Mother tongue (2021):

- English as first language: 0%
- French as first language: 98.4%
- English and French as first language: 0%
- Other as first language: 0%

== Government ==
=== List of mayors ===
- J. Gérald Coote, 1936
- J. A. Saucier, 1936-1952
- Henri Giguère, 1952-1961
- Guy Desrivières, 1961-1967
- Fernand Grenier, 1967-1974
- J.-Arthur Bédard, 1974-1982
- Raymond Blouin, 1982-1990 and 1994-2005
- Robert Simard, 1990-1994
- O'Donnell Bédard, 2005-
- Michel Croteau, –2021
- Yvan Côté, 2021–present

=== Political representation ===
Provincially it is part of the riding of La Peltrie. In the 2022 Quebec general election the incumbent MNA Éric Caire, of the Coalition Avenir Québec, was re-elected to represent the population of Lac-Saint-Joseph in the National Assembly of Quebec.

Federally, Lac-Saint-Joseph is part of the federal riding of Saint-Augustin—Portneuf—Jacques-Cartier. In the 2025 Canadian federal election, the incumbent Joël Godin of the Conservative Party was re-elected to represent the population Lac-Saint-Joseph in the House of Commons of Canada.

Lac-Saint-Joseph federal election results
Year	Liberal		Conservative		Bloc Québécois		New Democratic		Green	
2021	22%	31	53%	74	21%	30	1%	2	0%	0
2019	25%	29	36%	42	30%	35	3%	4	2%	3

Lac-Saint-Joseph provincial election results
Year	CAQ		Liberal		QC solidaire		Parti Québécois	
2018	40%	67	45%	76	8%	13	5%	9
2014	39%	40	47%	49	1%	1	13%	13

== See also ==
- List of cities in Quebec
