= Fossambault-sur-le-Lac =

- City
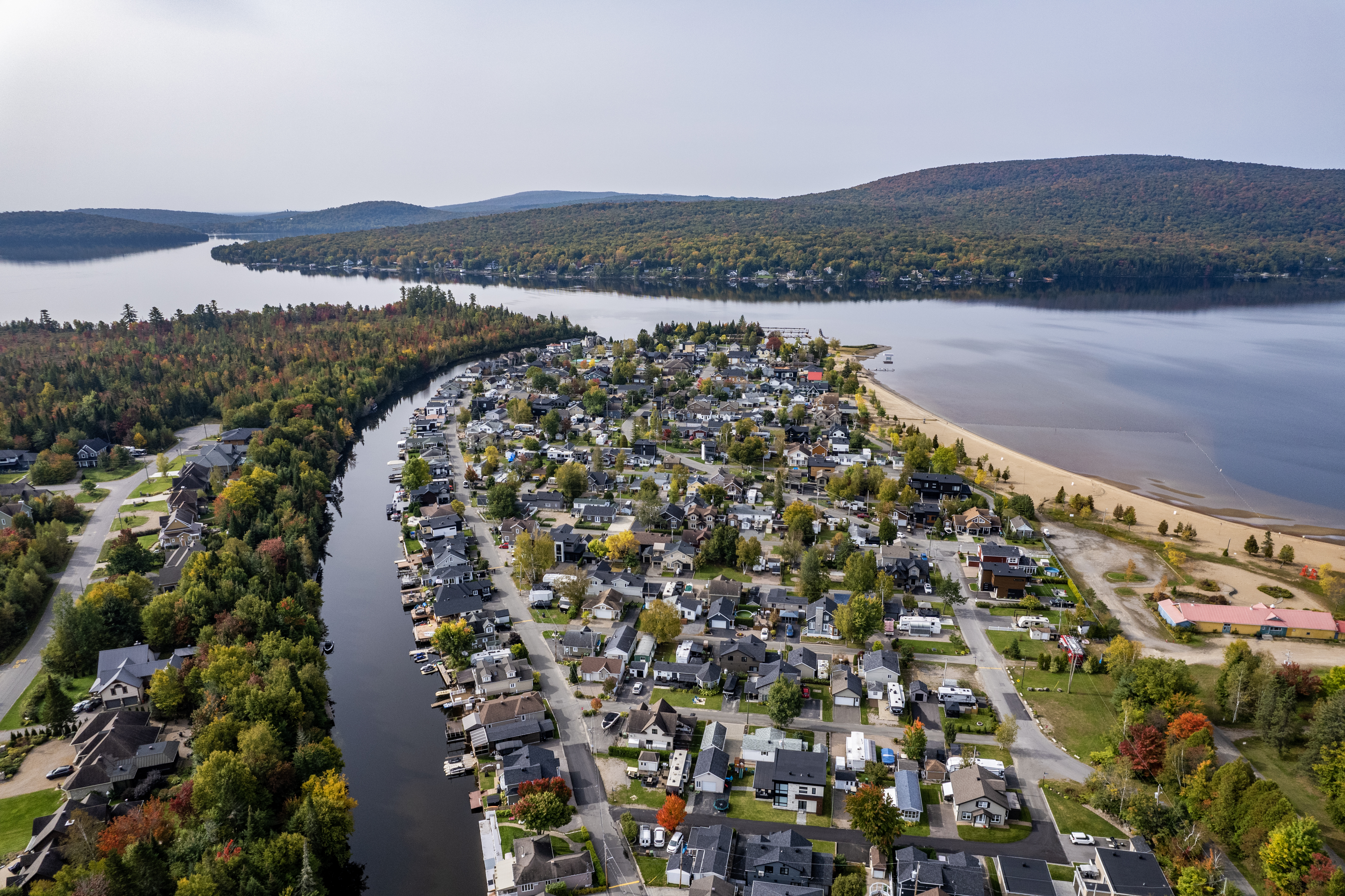
- Lake Saint-Joseph in Fossambault-sur-le-Lac
- Motto: Crois en l'avenir
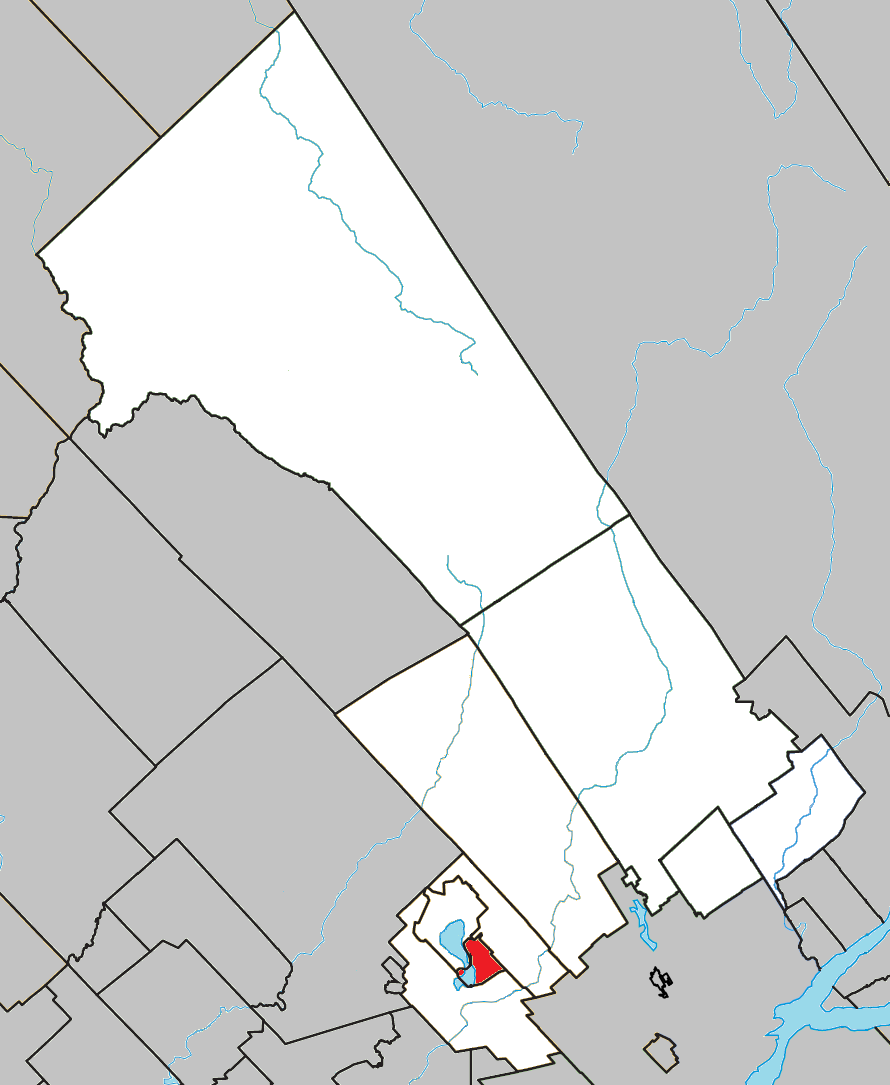
- Location within La Jacques-Cartier RCM

- Location in central Quebec
- Coordinates: 46°52′N 71°37′W
- Country: Canada
- Province: Quebec
- Region: Capitale-Nationale
- RCM: La Jacques-Cartier
- Constituted: March 10, 1949

Government
  - Mayor: Jacques Poulin
  - Fed. riding: Saint-Augustin—Portneuf—Jacques-Cartier
  - Prov. riding: Portneuf

Area
  - Total: 13.74 km^{2} (5.31 sq mi)
  - Land: 11.49 km^{2} (4.44 sq mi)
- Elevation: 367 m (1,204 ft)

Population (2021)
  - Total: 2,327
  - Density: 202.6/km^{2} (525/sq mi)
  - Pop (2016-21): ▲18.7%
  - Dwellings: 1,282
- Time zone: UTC−5 (EST)
  - Summer (DST): UTC−4 (EDT)
- Postal code(s): G3N
- Area codes: 418, 581
- Highways: No major routes
- Website: fossambault-sur-le-lac.com

Fossambault-sur-le-Lac (French pronunciation: [fɔsɑ̃bo syʁ lə lak], lit. 'Fossambault on the Lake') is a city in the south part of Quebec, Canada, in La Jacques-Cartier Regional County Municipality, just north of Quebec City. It had a population of 2,327 as of the 2021 Canadian census. It is located on the southeastern part of Saint-Joseph Lake.

== History ==
The settlement of Lake Saint-Joseph began at the beginning of the twentieth century. Only an occupation of the territory by a few Irish farmers provides the traces of human occupation in the nineteenth century. The resort phenomenon appeared around 1896, when notary Cyprien Labrecque built a residence. Later, notables occupied the premises: notaries, clerks, doctors, and merchants, most of whom were citizens of Quebec.

In 1934, Thomas Maher, a Quebec City businessman, purchased land from the Consolidated Paper Corporation around the upper basin of the lake and part of the southern basin. Subdivided, these lands were offered to vacationers who came mainly from Quebec. Aware of the picturesque character of the site, he included clauses in the sales contracts requiring the new owners to build residences adapted to the surrounding natural context. It was from that year that the development of Lake Saint-Joseph underwent a real boom.

The Village Municipality of Fossambault-sur-le-Lac was founded on March 10, 1949, by Bill 174, when it separated from the Parish Municipality of Sainte-Catherine. The municipality was then led by its first Mayor Jules Gingras, his secretary-treasurer Mr. J.R. D'Avignon and aldermen F.J. Dinan, Philémon Garneau, J. Omer Martineau, G.J. Montminy and J. Rolland Séguin.

On September 28, 1974, it changed its statutes to become the City (ville) of Fossambault-sur-le-Lac.

== Demographics ==
In the 2021 Census of Population conducted by Statistics Canada, Fossambault-sur-le-Lac had a population of 2,327 living in 994 of its 1,282 total private dwellings, a change of 18.7% from its 2016 population of 1,960. With a land area of 11.49 km^{2} (4.44 sq mi), it had a population density of 202.5/km^{2} (524.5/sq mi) in 2021.

Canada census – Fossambault-sur-le-Lac community profile

| | 2021 | 2016 | 2011 |
| Population | 2,327 (+18.7% from 2016) | 1,960 (+21.5% from 2011) | 1,613 (+5.3% from 2006) |
| Land area | 11.49 km^{2} (4.44 sq mi) | 11.53 km^{2} (4.45 sq mi) | 11.38 km^{2} (4.39 sq mi) |
| Population density | 202.6/km^{2} (525/sq mi) | 170.0/km^{2} (440/sq mi) | 141.7/km^{2} (367/sq mi) |
| Median age | 42.4 (M: 42.4, F: 42.4) | 42.7 (M: 43.7, F: 41.5) | 44.2 (M: 45.1, F: 43.1) |
| Private dwellings | 1,282 (total) 994 (occupied) | 1,283 (total) | 1,257 (total) |
| Median household income | $103,000 | $82,432 | $72,030 |

References: 2021 2016 2011

Historical census populations – Fossambault-sur-le-Lac

| Year | Pop. | ±% |
|---|---|---|
| 1951 | 77 | — |
| 1956 | 104 | +35.1% |
| 1961 | 175 | +68.3% |
| 1966 | 52 | −70.3% |
| 1971 | 154 | +196.2% |
| 1976 | 303 | +96.8% |
| 1981 | 570 | +88.1% |
| 1986 | 651 | +14.2% |

| Year | Pop. | ±% |
|---|---|---|
| 1991 | 817 | +25.5% |
| 1996 | 921 | +12.7% |
| 2001 | 1,055 | +14.5% |
| 2006 | 1,532 | +45.2% |
| 2011 | 1,613 | +5.3% |
| 2016 | 1,960 | +21.5% |
| 2021 | 2,327 | +18.7% |

Source: Statistics Canada

Mother tongue (2021):

- English as first language: 2.1%
- French as first language: 95.5%
- English and French as first languages: 1.5%
- Other as first language: 0.9%

== Places of interest ==
Station Touristique Duchesnay is one of the most attractive places of the town. The Jacques-Cartier River flows just nearby, and Route Fossambault links the town to Sainte-Catherine-de-la-Jacques-Cartier, where the Sainte Catherine's church is located. There is also a well-known hotel, called "Hotel de la Glace", with views overlooking the lake.

== See also ==
- List of cities in Quebec
