= Shannon, Quebec =

Shannon
- City
- Aerial view of Shannon
- Nickname: Shannon City
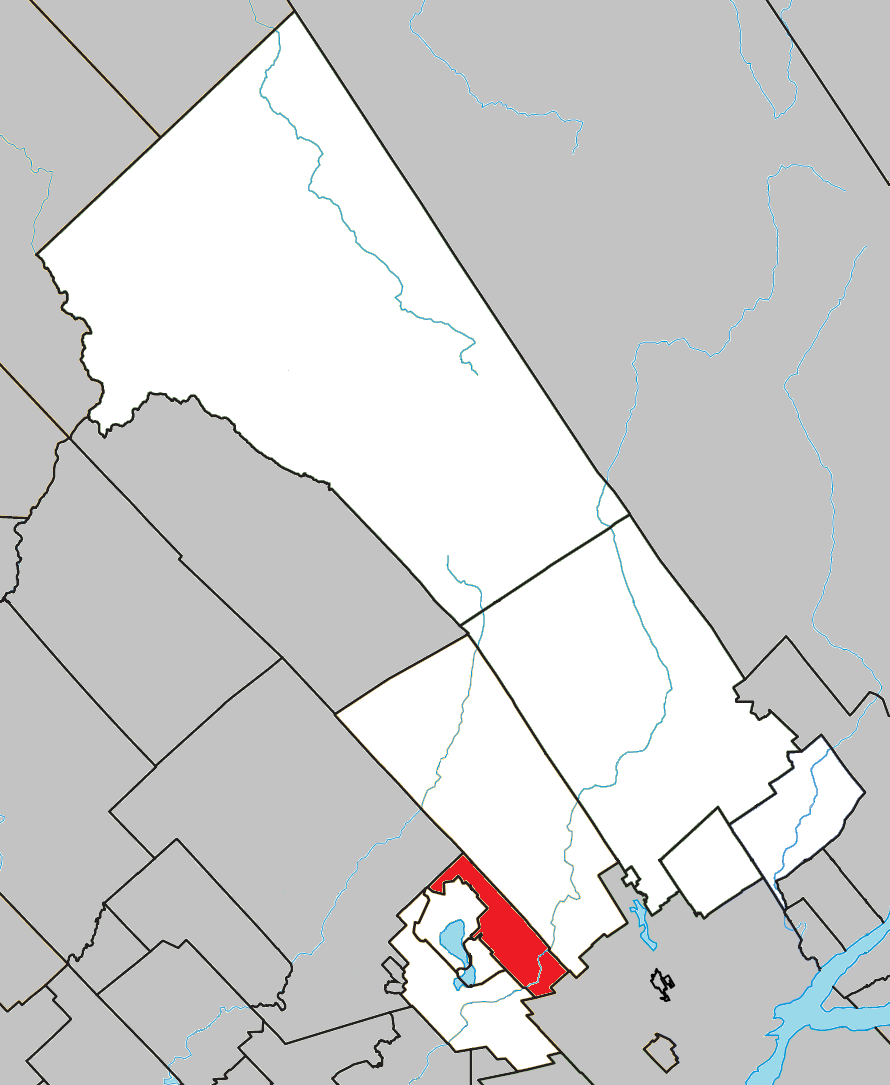
- Location within La Jacques-Cartier RCM

- Location in central Quebec
- Coordinates: 46°53′N 71°31′W
- Country: Canada
- Province: Quebec
- Region: Capitale-Nationale
- RCM: La Jacques-Cartier
- Settled: 1830s
- Constituted: January 1, 1947

Government
  - Mayor: Sarah Perreault
  - Fed. riding: Saint-Augustin—Portneuf—Jacques-Cartier
  - Prov. riding: La Peltrie

Area
  - Total: 65.02 km^{2} (25.10 sq mi)
  - Land: 63.54 km^{2} (24.53 sq mi)

Population (2021)
  - Total: 6,432
  - Density: 101.2/km^{2} (262/sq mi)
  - Pop (2016-21): ▲6.6%
  - Dwellings: 2,437
- Time zone: UTC−5 (EST)
  - Summer (DST): UTC−4 (EDT)
- Postal code(s): G3S
- Area codes: 418, 581
- Highways: R-369
- Website: shannon.ca

Shannon is a city in Quebec, Canada, and is along the Jacques-Cartier River northwest of Quebec City.

It was formed in December 1946, when it separated from the territory of Sainte-Catherine-de-Fossambault, following protests of this part of the population against the municipal taxes. The community was founded by Irish immigrants and once contained a substantial English-speaking population though it is today chiefly French-speaking. Its longtime principal economic activity was the exploitation of wood bound for the shipyards of Quebec. The town is located near CFB Valcartier, an important Canadian military base.

== History ==
The area was first settled in the 19th century, by mostly Irish immigrants. The place may have been named after a prominent settler family, as religious records indicated the death of a certain Richard Shannon in 1831 and Simon Shannon the next year. Further impetus to its development came around 1850, when the timber industry began, and in 1860, when a sawmill was built. Around 1861, about two thirds of the population was Irish and by 1900 half of the population.

In 1905, the Shannon Post Office opened. In 1914, part of Shannon's territory was expropriated to enlarge the Valcartier military base.

In 1947, the Municipality of Shannon was officially established, when it separated from the Parish Municipality of Sainte-Catherine-de-Fossambault. It changed statutes in 2017 to become a city.

=== Cancer cluster ===
In 1997, it was discovered that the chemical trichloroethylene seeped into the town's water supply from a nearby munitions factory. That was claimed to increase the rates of cancers in the area, with more than 3,000 people taking part in a group lawsuit against the federal government in 2003.

After years of campaigning, compensation was later awarded to some local residents, but the court did not endorse the link between the contamination and cancers. Instead, compensation was awarded for the contamination of water supplies.

== Demographics ==
In the 2021 Census of Population conducted by Statistics Canada, Shannon had a population of 6,432 living in 2,332 of its 2,437 total private dwellings, a change of 6.6% from its 2016 population of 6,031. With a land area of 63.54 km^{2} (24.53 sq mi), it had a population density of 101.2/km^{2} (262.2/sq mi) in 2021.

Historical Census Data - Shannon, Quebec

Year	Pop.	±%
1951	281	—
1956	351	+24.9%
1961	3,703	+955.0%
1966	3,806	+2.8%
1971	3,998	+5.0%
1976	3,539	−11.5%
1981	3,488	−1.4%
1986	3,311	−5.1%

Year	Pop.	±%
1991	3,535	+6.8%
1996	3,751	+6.1%
2001	3,668	−2.2%
2006	3,825	+4.3%
2011	5,086	+33.0%
2016	6,031	+18.6%
2021	6,432	+6.6%

Source: Statistics Canada

Mother tongue (2021):

- English as first language: 5.3%
- French as first language: 90.3%
- English and French as first languages: 2.6%
- Other as first language: 1.5%

== Government ==
List of former mayors:

- Thomas Guilfoyle (1947–1950)
- J.A. Griffin (1950–1953)
- Eddy Conway (1953–1959, 1969–1977)
- Thomas McCarthy (1959–1964)
- John Donaldson (1964–1969)
- Gaudiose Pouliot (1977–1979)
- Maureen C. Maher (1979–1989)
- Jean-Pierre Soucy (1989–1995)
- Laurier Picard (1995–1997)
- Clive Kiley (1997–2017)
- Mike-James Noonan (2017–2021)
- Sarah Perreault (2021–present)

== See also ==
- List of cities in Quebec
