= La Jacques-Cartier Regional County Municipality =

La Jacques-Cartier
- Regional county municipality
- Coordinates: 47°02′N 71°35′W
- Country: Canada
- Province: Quebec
- Region: Capitale-Nationale
- Effective: April 1, 1981
- County seat: Shannon
- Municipalities: List: Shannon; Sainte-Catherine-de-la-Jacques-Cartier; Lac-Beauport; Stoneham-et-Tewkesbury; Lac-Delage; Fossambault-sur-le-Lac; Saint-Gabriel-de-Valcartier; Sainte-Brigitte-de-Laval; Lac-Saint-Joseph; Lac-Croche

Government
  - Type: Prefecture
  - Prefect: Jacques Marcotte

Area
  - Total: 3,321.20 km^{2} (1,282.32 sq mi)
  - Land: 3,183.75 km^{2} (1,229.25 sq mi)

Population (2021)
  - Total: 47,813
  - Density: 15/km^{2} (39/sq mi)
  - Change (2016-21): ▲10%
  - Dwellings: 19,877
- Time zone: UTC−5 (EST)
  - Summer (DST): UTC−4 (EDT)
- Area codes: 418, 581
- Website: mrc.jacques-cartier.com

La Jacques-Cartier (French pronunciation: [la ʒak kaʁtje], Canadian French: [la ʒɑːk kaʁt͡sje]) is a regional county municipality in the Capitale-Nationale region of Quebec, Canada. The seat is in Shannon. It is named after the Jacques-Cartier River which runs through it and takes its source in its upper country.

== Subdivisions ==
There are 10 subdivisions within the RCM:

Cities & Towns (6)

- Fossambault-sur-le-Lac
- Lac-Delage
- Lac-Saint-Joseph
- Sainte-Brigitte-de-Laval
- Sainte-Catherine-de-la-Jacques-Cartier
- Shannon

Municipalities (2)

- Lac-Beauport
- Saint-Gabriel-de-Valcartier

United Townships (1)

- Stoneham-et-Tewkesbury

Unorganized Territory (1)

- Lac-Croche

== Demographics ==
=== Population ===
Canada census – La Jacques-Cartier community profile

	2021	2016	2011
Population	47,813 (+10.0% from 2016)	43,485 (+17.8% from 2011)	36,883 (+24.0% from 2006)
Land area	3,183.75 km^{2} (1,229.25 sq mi)	3,195.75 km^{2} (1,233.89 sq mi)	3,194.99 km^{2} (1,233.59 sq mi)
Population density	15.0/km^{2} (39/sq mi)	13.6/km^{2} (35/sq mi)	11.5/km^{2} (30/sq mi)
Median age	37.2 (M: 37.6, F: 36.8)	36.0 (M: 36.4, F: 35.7)	35.5 (M: 36.0, F: 34.8)
Private dwellings	19,877 (total) 18,301 (occupied)	18,401 (total)	16,206 (total)
Median household income	$109,000	$90,884	$79,769

References: 2021 2016 2011

Historical Census Data - La Jacques-Cartier Regional County Municipality, Quebec

Year	Pop.	±%
1991	23,282	—
1996	24,819	+6.6%
2001	26,459	+6.6%
2006	29,738	+12.4%

Year	Pop.	±%
2011	36,883	+24.0%
2011rev	36,929	+0.1%
2016	43,485	+17.8%
2021	47,813	+10.0%

Source: Statistics Canada

=== Language ===
Canada Census Mother Tongue - La Jacques-Cartier Regional County Municipality, Quebec
Census	Total	French			English			French & English			Other		
Year	Responses	Count	Trend	Pop %	Count	Trend	Pop %	Count	Trend	Pop %	Count	Trend	Pop %
2021	47,810	45,315	▲10.3	94.8%	1,220	▼13.8%	2.6%	640	▲75.3%	1.3%	500	▼6.5%	1.0%
2016	43,410	41,095	▲17.8%	94.7%	1,415	▲9.3%	3.3%	365	▲30.4%	0.8%	535	▲67.2%	0.9%
2011	36,790	34,895	▲25.2%	94.9%	1,295	▲22.2%	3.5%	280	▲30.2%	0.8%	320	▼39.6%	0.9%
2006	29,680	27,875	▲13.1%	93.9%	1,060	▼17.2%	3.6%	215	▲2.4%	0.7%	530	▲112.0%	1.8%
2001	26,380	24,640	▲7.9%	93.4%	1,280	▼15.5%	4.9%	210	▲27.3%	0.8%	250	▲35.1%	1.0%
1996	24,705	22,840	n/a	92.5%	1,515	n/a	6.1%	165	n/a	0.7%	185	n/a	0.8%

== Transportation ==
=== Access Routes ===
Highways and numbered routes that run through the municipality, including external routes that start or finish at the county border:

- Autoroutes
  - A-73
  - A-973
- Principal Highways
  - R-175
- Secondary Highways
  - R-358
  - R-367
  - R-369
  - R-371
- External Routes
  - None

== See also ==
- List of regional county municipalities and equivalent territories in Quebec
