= Sainte-Catherine-de-la-Jacques-Cartier =

- City
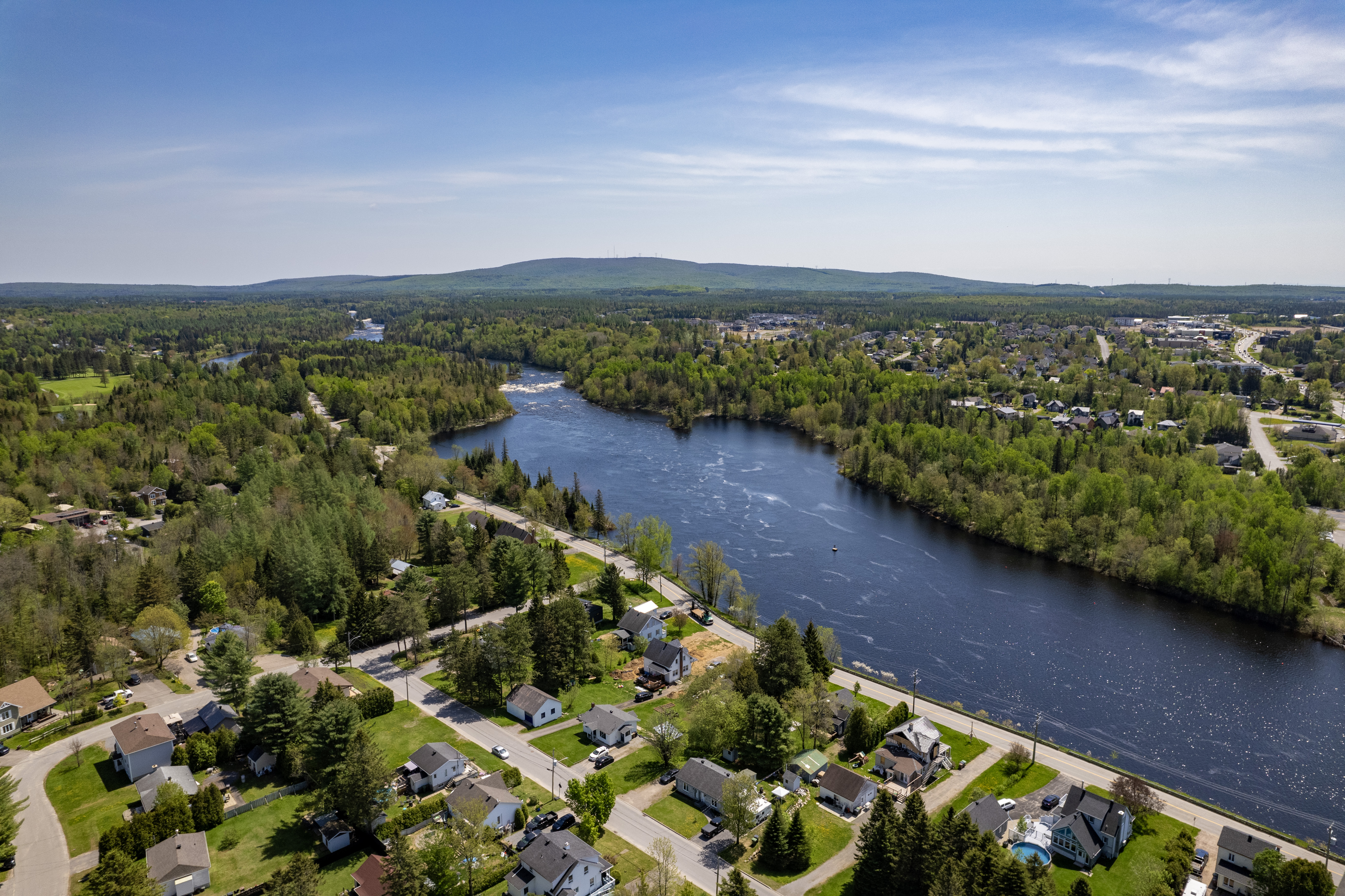

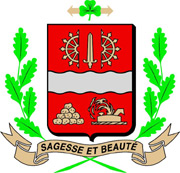
- Coat of arms

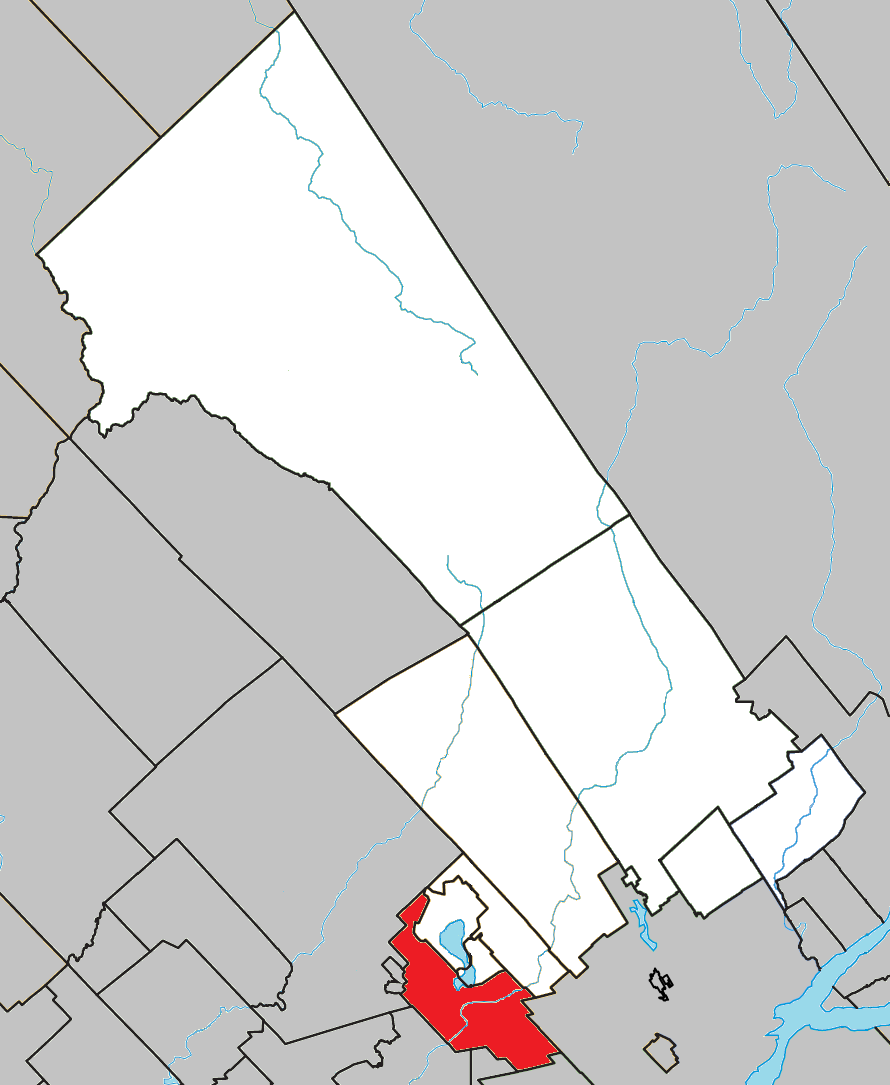
- Location within La Jacques-Cartier RCM

- Location in central Quebec
- Coordinates: 46°51′N 71°37′W
- Country: Canada
- Province: Quebec
- Region: Capitale-Nationale
- RCM: La Jacques-Cartier
- Constituted: July 1, 1855

Government
  - Mayor: Mathieu Roberge
  - Fed. riding: Saint-Augustin—Portneuf—Jacques-Cartier
  - Prov. riding: Portneuf

Area
  - Total: 122.76 km^{2} (47.40 sq mi)
  - Land: 120.70 km^{2} (46.60 sq mi)

Population (2021)
  - Total: 8,442
  - Density: 69.9/km^{2} (181/sq mi)
  - Pop (2016-21): ▲9.6%
  - Dwellings: 3,407
- Time zone: UTC−05:00 (EST)
  - Summer (DST): UTC−04:00 (EDT)
- Postal code(s): G3N
- Area codes: 418, 581
- Highways: R-367 R-369
- Website: www.villescjc.com

Sainte-Catherine-de-la-Jacques-Cartier (French pronunciation: [sɛ̃t katʁin də la ʒak kaʁtje]) is a town in Quebec, Canada, located in the regional county municipality of La Jacques-Cartier, in the administrative region of Capitale-Nationale. The Jacques-Cartier River passes through the city.

Local attractions include bicycle paths, the Anne-Hébert Social and Cultural Centre, the Ice Hotel and the Duchesnay Inn. The city also has a youth centre and an elementary school with three buildings.

The city is named after Catherine Nau de La Boissière et de Fossambault, a noblewoman of New France.

== History ==
The area was granted as a fief to Alexandre Peuvret de Gaudarville (1664-1702) in 1693, whose mother was Catherine Nau de La Boissière et de Fossambault, daughter of Jacques Nau de La Boissière et de Fossambault, advisor to the king. By the 1820s, the lord of the fief was Michel-Louis Juchereau Duchesnay, whose mother was also called Catherine.

In 1824, the Parish of Sainte-Catherine-de-Fossambault was formed, and in 1845, the Parish Municipality of Sainte-Catherine was created, but dissolved in 1847. The following year, the post office opened with the English name St. Catherines. In 1855, the Parish Municipality of Sainte-Catherine was reestablished. To distinguish this place from other Sainte-Catherines, it was also known as Sainte-Catherine-de-Fossambault or Sainte-Catherine-de-Portneuf (since it was formerly part of Portneuf Regional County Municipality).

On September 29, 1984, it changed statutes and name to become the Municipality of Sainte-Catherine-de-la-Jacques-Cartier, and on December 9, 2000, it changed statutes to become a city.

== Demographics ==
In the 2021 Census of Population conducted by Statistics Canada, Sainte-Catherine-de-la-Jacques-Cartier had a population of 8,442 living in 3,298 of its 3,407 total private dwellings, a change of 9.6% from its 2016 population of 7,706. With a land area of 120.7 km^{2} (46.6 sq mi), it had a population density of 69.9/km^{2} (181.1/sq mi) in 2021.

Historical Census Data - Sainte-Catherine-de-la-Jacques-Cartier

Year	Pop.	±%
1861	1,670	—
1871	1,263	−24.4%
1881	1,202	−4.8%
1891	1,103	−8.2%
1901	1,137	+3.1%
1911	1,158	+1.8%
1921	1,072	−7.4%
1931	1,007	−6.1%

Year	Pop.	±%
1941	1,341	+33.2%
1951	1,473	+9.8%
1956	1,571	+6.7%
1961	1,522	−3.1%
1966	1,747	+14.8%
1971	2,118	+21.2%
1976	2,407	+13.6%
1981	3,312	+37.6%

Year	Pop.	±%
1986	3,586	+8.3%
1991	4,011	+11.9%
1996	4,428	+10.4%
2001	4,681	+5.7%
2006	5,021	+7.3%
2011	6,319	+25.9%
2016	7,706	+21.9%
2021	8,442	+9.6%

Source: Statistics Canada

Mother tongue (2021):

- English as first language: 2.0%
- French as first language: 96.0%
- English and French as first languages: 0.9%
- Other as first language: 0.8%

== Government ==
Elected in the 2025 Quebec municipal elections

- Mayor: Mathieu Roberge
- District #1: Jeremy Ouellet-Rousseau
- District #2: Eric Gadoury
- District #3: Marc-Antoine Gagnon
- District #4: David Milot
- District #5: Josée Lampron
- District #6: Martin Chabot

== See also ==
- List of cities in Quebec
