= List of members of the Canadian House of Commons (D) =

== D' ==
- Jean-Claude D'Amours b. 1972 first elected in 2004 as Liberal member for Madawaska—Restigouche, New Brunswick.
- Chris d'Entremont b. 1969 first elected in 2019 as Conservative member for West Nova, Nova Scotia.

== Dab–Dau ==
- Julie Dabrusin b. 1971 first elected in 2015 as Liberal member for Toronto—Danforth, Ontario.
- John Dahmer b. 1938 first elected in 1988 as Progressive Conservative member for Beaver River, Alberta.
- Madeleine Dalphond-Guiral b. 1938 first elected in 1993 as Bloc Québécois member for Laval Centre, Quebec.
- Marc Dalton b. 1960 first elected in 2019 as Conservative member for Maple Ridge-Mission, British Columbia.
- Malachy Bowes Daly b. 1836 first elected in 1878 as Liberal-Conservative member for Halifax, Nova Scotia.
- Thomas Mayne Daly b. 1827 first elected in 1872 as Liberal-Conservative member for Perth North, Ontario.
- Thomas Mayne Daly b. 1852 first elected in 1887 as Liberal-Conservative member for Selkirk, Manitoba.
- Pam Damoff b. 1971 first elected in 2015 as Liberal member for Oakville North—Burlington, Ontario.
- Arthur Byron Damude b. 1889 first elected in 1935 as Liberal member for Welland, Ontario.
- Leila Dance first elected in 2024 as New Democratic Party member for Elmwood—Transcona, Manitoba
- Raquel Dancho b. 1990 first elected in 2019 as Conservative member for Kildonan—St. Paul, Manitoba.
- Marianne Dandurand first elected in 2025 as Liberal member for Compton—Stanstead, Quebec.
- Harold Warren Danforth b. 1916 first elected in 1958 as Progressive Conservative member for Kent, Ontario.
- Joe Daniel b. 1954 first elected in 2011 as Conservative member for Don Valley East, Ontario.
- John Waterhouse Daniel b. 1845 first elected in 1904 as Conservative member for City of St. John, New Brunswick.
- Kenneth Daniel b. 1892 first elected in 1945 as Progressive Conservative member for Oxford, Ontario.
- Marcel Danis b. 1943 first elected in 1984 as Progressive Conservative member for Verchères, Quebec.
- John-Paul Danko first elected in 2025 as Liberal member for Hamilton West—Ancaster—Dundas, Ontario.
- Barnett Jerome Danson b. 1921 first elected in 1968 as Liberal member for York North, Ontario.
- Vincent Martin Dantzer b. 1923 first elected in 1980 as Progressive Conservative member for Okanagan North, British Columbia.
- Jean-Baptiste Daoust b. 1817 first elected in 1867 as Conservative member for Two Mountains, Quebec.
- Francis Nicholson Darke b. 1863 first elected in 1925 as Liberal member for Regina, Saskatchewan.
- Stan Darling b. 1911 first elected in 1972 as Progressive Conservative member for Parry Sound-Muskoka, Ontario.
- Arnold Darroch b. 1898 first elected in 1949 as Liberal member for Wellington North, Ontario.
- David Bruce Daubney b. 1947 first elected in 1984 as Progressive Conservative member for Ottawa West, Ontario.
- Robert Daudlin b. 1940 first elected in 1974 as Liberal member for Kent—Essex, Ontario.

== Dav–Day ==
- Michel Daviault b. 1952 first elected in 1993 as Bloc Québécois member for Ahuntsic, Quebec.
- Avard Longley Davidson b. 1877 first elected in 1911 as Conservative member for Annapolis, Nova Scotia.
- James Ironside Davidson b. 1818 first elected in 1891 as Liberal member for Ontario South, Ontario.
- Patricia Davidson b. 1946 first elected in 2006 as Conservative member for Sarnia—Lambton, Ontario.
- Robert Davison b. 1875 first elected in 1935 as Liberal member for Stanstead, Quebec.
- Scot Davidson first elected in 2019 as Conservative member for York—Simcoe, Ontario.
- Claudius Charles Davies b. 1879 first elected in 1921 as Progressive member for North Battleford, Saskatchewan.
- Daniel Davies b. 1825 first elected in 1873 as Conservative member for King's County, Prince Edward Island.
- Don Davies b. 1963 first elected in 2008 as New Democratic member for Vancouver Kingsway, British Columbia.
- Fred Davies first elected in 2025 as Conservative member for Niagara South, Ontario.
- Libby Davies b. 1953 first elected in 1997 as New Democratic Party member for Vancouver East, British Columbia.
- Louis Henry Davies b. 1845 first elected in 1882 as Liberal member for Queen's County, Prince Edward Island.
- Percy Griffith Davies b. 1902 first elected in 1932 as Conservative member for Athabaska, Alberta.
- Nicholas Flood Davin b. 1843 first elected in 1887 as Liberal-Conservative member for Assiniboia West, Northwest Territories.
- Donald Watson Davis b. 1849 first elected in 1887 as Conservative member for Provisional District of Alberta, Northwest Territories.
- Fred Davis b. 1868 first elected in 1925 as Conservative member for Calgary East, Alberta.
- Fred Langdon Davis b. 1868 first elected in 1917 as Unionist member for Neepawa, Manitoba.
- John Davis b. 1916 first elected in 1962 as Liberal member for Coast-Capilano, British Columbia.
- Thomas Osborne Davis b. 1856 first elected in 1896 as Liberal member for Provisional District of Saskatchewan, Northwest Territories.
- Dennis Dawson b. 1949 first elected in 1977 as Liberal member for Louis-Hébert, Quebec.
- George Walker Wesley Dawson b. 1858 first elected in 1891 as Liberal member for Addington, Ontario.
- John A. Dawson b. 1826 first elected in 1874 as Liberal member for Pictou, Nova Scotia.
- Mike Dawson b. 1976 first elected in 2025 as Liberal member for Miramichi—Grand Lake, New Brunswick.
- Simon James Dawson b. 1820 first elected in 1878 as Conservative member for Algoma, Ontario.
- Anne-Marie Day b. 1954 first elected in 2011 as New Democratic Party member for Charlesbourg—Haute-Saint-Charles, Quebec.
- Stockwell Day b. 1950 first elected in 2000 as Canadian Alliance member for Okanagan—Coquihalla, British Columbia.

== De–Dec ==
- Pierre De Bané b. 1938 first elected in 1968 as Liberal member for Matane, Quebec.
- Roland De Corneille b. 1927 first elected in 1979 as Liberal member for Eglinton—Lawrence, Ontario.
- Amor De Cosmos b. 1825 first elected in 1871 as Liberal member for Victoria, British Columbia.
- Robert René De Cotret b. 1944 first elected in 1978 as Progressive Conservative member for Ottawa Centre, Ontario.
- Simon Leendert De Jong b. 1942 first elected in 1979 as New Democratic Party member for Regina East, Saskatchewan.
- Pierre de Savoye b. 1942 first elected in 1993 as Bloc Québécois member for Portneuf, Quebec.
- Joseph Esdras Alfred de St-Georges b. 1849 first elected in 1872 as Liberal member for Portneuf, Quebec.
- Jeremiah Smith Boies De Veber b. 1830 first elected in 1873 as Liberal member for City of St. John, New Brunswick.
- Grant Deachman b. 1913 first elected in 1963 as Liberal member for Vancouver Quadra, British Columbia.
- Robert John Deachman b. 1878 first elected in 1935 as Liberal member for Huron North, Ontario.
- Walter Deakon b. 1924 first elected in 1968 as Liberal member for High Park, Ontario.
- Ian Deans b. 1937 first elected in 1980 as New Democratic Party member for Hamilton Mountain, Ontario.
- Claude DeBellefeuille b. 1963 first elected in 2006 as Bloc Québécois member for Beauharnois—Salaberry, Quebec.
- Maud Debien b. 1938 first elected in 1993 as Bloc Québécois member for Laval East, Quebec.
- Charles Deblois b. 1939 first elected in 1988 as Progressive Conservative member for Montmorency—Orléans, Quebec.
- Alphonse Arthur Miville Déchêne b. 1848 first elected in 1896 as Liberal member for L'Islet, Quebec.
- Joseph Bruno Aimé Miville Déchêne b. 1882 first elected in 1917 as Laurier Liberal member for Montmagny, Quebec.
- Joseph Miville Dechene b. 1879 first elected in 1940 as Liberal member for Athabaska, Alberta.
- Bob Dechert b. 1958 first elected in 2008 as Conservative member for Mississauga—Erindale, Ontario.
- John Decore b. 1909 first elected in 1949 as Liberal member for Vegreville, Alberta.
- Matt DeCourcey b. 1983 first elected in 2015 as Liberal member for Fredericton, New Brunswick.

== Del–Der ==
- Dean Del Mastro b. 1970 first elected in 2006 as Conservative member for Peterborough, Ontario.
- Arthur Delisle b. 1859 first elected in 1891 as Liberal member for Portneuf, Quebec.
- Michel-Siméon Delisle b. 1856 first elected in 1900 as Liberal member for Portneuf, Quebec.
- Vincent Della Noce b. 1943 first elected in 1984 as Progressive Conservative member for Duvernay, Quebec.
- Louis Delorme b. 1824 first elected in 1870 as Liberal member for St. Hyacinthe, Quebec.
- Pierre Delorme b. 1831 first elected in 1871 as Conservative member for Provencher, Manitoba.
- Gérard Deltell b. 1964 first elected in 2015 as Conservative member for Louis-Saint-Laurent, Quebec.
- Léopold Demers b. 1912 first elected in 1948 as Liberal member for Laval—Two Mountains, Quebec.
- Louis Julien Demers b. 1848 first elected in 1899 as Liberal member for Lévis, Quebec.
- Louis Philippe Demers b. 1863 first elected in 1900 as Liberal member for St. Johns—Iberville, Quebec.
- Marie Joseph Demers b. 1871 first elected in 1906 as Liberal member for St. Johns—Iberville, Quebec.
- Nicole Demers b. 1950 first elected in 2004 as Bloc Québécois member for Laval, Quebec.
- Yves Demers b. 1938 first elected in 1972 as Liberal member for Duvernay, Quebec.
- Pierre Deniger b. 1947 first elected in 1979 as Liberal member for Laprairie, Quebec.
- Azellus Denis b. 1907 first elected in 1935 as Liberal member for St. Denis, Quebec.
- Jean-Joseph Denis b. 1876 first elected in 1917 as Laurier Liberal member for Joliette, Quebec.
- Joseph-Arthur Denis b. 1881 first elected in 1921 as Liberal member for St. Denis, Quebec.
- Louis Deniset b. 1919 first elected in 1957 as Liberal member for St. Boniface, Manitoba.
- Frederick Charles Denison b. 1846 first elected in 1887 as Conservative member for West Toronto, Ontario.
- Daniel Derbyshire b. 1846 first elected in 1904 as Liberal member for Brockville, Ontario.
- Kelly DeRidder first elected in 2025 as Conservative member for Kitchener Centre, Ontario.

== Des ==
- Alexis Lesieur Desaulniers b. 1837 first elected in 1884 as Conservative member for Maskinongé, Quebec.
- Arthur Lesieur Desaulniers b. 1873 first elected in 1917 as Laurier Liberal member for Champlain, Quebec.
- François Sévère Lesieur Desaulniers b. 1850 first elected in 1887 as Conservative member for Saint Maurice, Quebec.
- Louis Léon Lesieur Desaulniers b. 1823 first elected in 1867 as Conservative member for Saint Maurice, Quebec.
- Caroline Desbiens first elected in 2019 as Bloc Québécois member for Beauport—Côte-de-Beaupré—Île d'Orléans—Charlevoix, Quebec.
- Joseph Adélard Descarries b. 1853 first elected in 1915 as Conservative member for Jacques Cartier, Quebec.
- Marcel Deschambault b. 1916 first elected in 1958 as Progressive Conservative member for Terrebonne, Quebec.
- Johanne Deschamps b. 1959 first elected in 2004 as Bloc Québécois member for Laurentides—Labelle, Quebec.
- Jean-Paul Deschatelets b. 1912 first elected in 1953 as Liberal member for Maisonneuve—Rosemont, Quebec.
- Alexis Deschênes first elected in 2025 as Bloc Québécois member for Gaspésie—Les Îles-de-la-Madeleine—Listuguj, Quebec.
- Guillaume Deschênes-Thériault first elected in 2025 as Liberal member for Madawaska—Restigouche, New Brunswick.
- Joseph-Félix Descoteaux b. 1863 first elected in 1923 as Liberal member for Nicolet, Quebec.
- Bernard Deshaies b. 1953 first elected in 1993 as Bloc Québécois member for Abitibi, Quebec.
- Luc Desilets first elected in 2019 as Bloc Québécois member for Rivière-des-Mille-Îles, Quebec.
- Alphonse Desjardins b. 1841 first elected in 1874 as Conservative member for Hochelaga, Quebec.
- Gabriel Desjardins b. 1949 first elected in 1984 as Progressive Conservative member for Témiscamingue, Quebec.
- Louis-Georges Desjardins b. 1849 first elected in 1890 as Conservative member for Montmorency, Quebec.
- Samuel Desjardins b. 1852 first elected in 1903 as Liberal member for Terrebonne, Quebec.
- Bev Desjarlais b. 1955 first elected in 1997 as New Democratic Party member for Churchill, Manitoba.
- Blake Desjarlais b. 1993 first elected in 2021 as New Democratic Party member for Edmonton Griesbach, Alberta.
- Hermas Deslauriers b. 1879 first elected in 1917 as Laurier Liberal member for St. Mary, Quebec.
- Joseph-Léon Deslières b. 1893 first elected in 1952 as Liberal member for Brome—Missisquoi, Quebec.
- Louis R. Desmarais b. 1923 first elected in 1979 as Liberal member for Dollard, Quebec.
- Odilon Desmarais b. 1854 first elected in 1896 as Liberal member for St. James, Quebec.
- Clayton Earl Desmond b. 1894 first elected in 1940 as National Government member for Kent, Ontario.
- Luc Desnoyers b. 1950 first elected in 2008 as Bloc Québécois member for Rivière-des-Mille-Îles, Quebec.
- Caroline Desrochers first elected in 2025 as Liberal member for Trois-Rivières, Quebec.
- Eugène Desrochers b. 1885 first elected in 1921 as Liberal member for Maskinongé, Quebec.
- Jules Desrochers b. 1874 first elected in 1930 as Liberal member for Portneuf, Quebec.
- Odina Desrochers b. 1951 first elected in 1997 as Bloc Québécois member for Lotbinière, Quebec.
- Édouard Desrosiers b. 1934 first elected in 1984 as Progressive Conservative member for Hochelaga—Maisonneuve, Quebec.
- Alexis Dessaint b. 1847 first elected in 1887 as Liberal member for Kamouraska, Quebec.

== Dev–Dew ==
- Paul Devillers b. 1946 first elected in 1993 as Liberal member for Simcoe North, Ontario.
- Bernard Devlin b. 1824 first elected in 1875 as Liberal member for Montreal Centre, Quebec.
- Charles Ramsay Devlin b. 1858 first elected in 1891 as Liberal member for County of Ottawa, Quebec.
- Emmanuel Berchmans Devlin b. 1872 first elected in 1905 as Liberal member for Wright, Quebec.
- Barry Devolin b. 1963 first elected in 2004 as Conservative member for Haliburton—Kawartha Lakes—Brock, Ontario.
- Austin Edwin Dewar b. 1912 first elected in 1949 as Liberal member for Qu'Appelle, Saskatchewan.
- Marion Dewar b. 1928 first elected in 1987 as New Democratic Party member for Hamilton Mountain, Ontario.
- Paul Dewar b. 1963 first elected in 2006 as New Democratic Party member for Ottawa Centre, Ontario.
- Edgar Dewdney b. 1835 first elected in 1872 as Conservative member for Yale, British Columbia.

== Dh ==
- Herb Dhaliwal b. 1952 first elected in 1993 as Liberal member for Vancouver South, British Columbia.
- Sukh Dhaliwal b. 1960 first elected in 2006 as Liberal member for Newton—North Delta, British Columbia.
- Ruby Dhalla b. 1974 first elected in 2004 as Liberal member for Brampton—Springdale, Ontario.
- Anju Dhillon b. 1979 first elected in 2015 as Liberal member for Dorval—Lachine—LaSalle, Quebec.

== Di ==
- Nicola Di Iorio b. 1958 first elected in 2015 as Liberal member for Saint-Léonard—Saint-Michel, Quebec.
- Lena Diab b. 1965 first elected in 2021 as Liberal member for Halifax West, Nova Scotia.
- Paul Wyatt Dick b. 1940 first elected in 1972 as Progressive Conservative member for Lanark—Renfrew—Carleton, Ontario.
- Arthur Rupert Dickey b. 1854 first elected in 1888 as Conservative member for Cumberland, Nova Scotia.
- John Horace Dickey b. 1914 first elected in 1947 as Liberal member for Halifax, Nova Scotia.
- Charles Herbert Dickie b. 1859 first elected in 1921 as Conservative member for Nanaimo, British Columbia.
- George Lemuel Dickinson b. 1848 first elected in 1888 as Conservative member for Carleton, Ontario.
- Moss Kent Dickinson b. 1822 first elected in 1882 as Conservative member for Russell, Ontario.
- John Diefenbaker b. 1895 first elected in 1940 as Conservative member for Lake Centre, Saskatchewan.
- Wilbert David Dimock b. 1846 first elected in 1896 as Conservative member for Colchester, Nova Scotia.
- David Charles Dingwall b. 1952 first elected in 1980 as Liberal member for Cape Breton—East Richmond, Nova Scotia.
- Walter Gilbert Dinsdale b. 1916 first elected in 1951 as Progressive Conservative member for Brandon, Manitoba.
- Joseph-Alfred Dion b. 1897 first elected in 1945 as Independent Liberal member for Lake St-John—Roberval, Quebec.
- Rolland Dion b. 1938 first elected in 1979 as Liberal member for Portneuf, Quebec.
- Stéphane Dion b. 1955 first elected in 1996 as Liberal member for Saint-Laurent—Cartierville, Quebec.
- Charles-Eugène Dionne b. 1908 first elected in 1962 as Social Credit member for Kamouraska, Quebec.
- Georges-Léonidas Dionne b. 1876 first elected in 1925 as Liberal member for Matane, Quebec.
- Ludger Dionne b. 1888 first elected in 1945 as Liberal member for Beauce, Quebec.
- Marcel Dionne b. 1931 first elected in 1979 as Liberal member for Chicoutimi, Quebec.
- Maurice Dionne b. 1936 first elected in 1974 as Liberal member for Northumberland—Miramichi, New Brunswick.
- Pierre Dionne Labelle b. 1955 first elected in 2011 as New Democratic Party member for Rivière-du-Nord, Quebec.
- Kerry Diotte b. 1956 first elected in 2015 as Conservative member for Edmonton Griesbach, Alberta.
- Nunzio Discepola b. 1949 first elected in 1993 as Liberal member for Vaudreuil, Quebec.

== Dob–Don ==
- Dorothy Dobbie b. 1945 first elected in 1988 as Progressive Conservative member for Winnipeg South, Manitoba.
- Thomas William Dobbie b. 1829 first elected in 1867 as Conservative member for Elgin East, Ontario.
- Richard Reid Dobell b. 1837 first elected in 1896 as Liberal member for Quebec West, Quebec.
- Michelle Dockrill b. 1959 first elected in 1997 as New Democratic Party member for Bras d'Or, Nova Scotia.
- Murray Dodd b. 1843 first elected in 1882 as Conservative member for Cape Breton, Nova Scotia.
- Anson Dodge b. 1834 first elected in 1872 as Conservative member for York North, Ontario.
- Charles Joseph Doherty b. 1855 first elected in 1908 as Conservative member for St. Anne, Quebec.
- Todd Doherty b. 1968 first elected in 2015 as Conservative member for Cariboo—Prince George, British Columbia.
- William Henry Domm b. 1930 first elected in 1979 as Progressive Conservative member for Peterborough, Ontario.
- James Domville b. 1842 first elected in 1872 as Conservative member for King's, New Brunswick.
- Dugald Donaghy b. 1873 first elected in 1925 as Liberal member for Vancouver North, British Columbia.
- William Donahue b. 1834 first elected in 1874 as Liberal member for Missisquoi, Quebec.
- Samuel James Donaldson b. 1856 first elected in 1915 as Conservative member for Prince Albert, Saskatchewan.
- Han Dong b. 1977 first elected in 2019 as Liberal member for Don Valley North, Ontario.
- Fin Donnelly b. 1966 first elected in 2009 as New Democratic Party member for New Westminster—Coquitlam, British Columbia.
- James J. Donnelly b. 1866 first elected in 1904 as Conservative member for Bruce East, Ontario.
- Thomas F. Donnelly b. 1874 first elected in 1925 as Liberal member for Willow Bunch, Saskatchewan.

== Dor–Doy ==
- Rosane Doré Lefebvre b. 1984 first elected in 2011 as New Democratic Party member for Alfred-Pellan, Quebec.
- Murray Dorin b. 1953 first elected in 1984 as Progressive Conservative member for Edmonton West, Alberta.
- Antoine-Aimé Dorion b. 1818 first elected in 1867 as Liberal member for Hochelaga, Quebec.
- Charles Napoléon Dorion b. 1887 first elected in 1930 as Conservative member for Québec—Montmorency, Quebec.
- Frédéric Dorion b. 1898 first elected in 1942 as Independent member for Charlevoix—Saguenay, Quebec.
- Jean Dorion b. 1942 first elected in 2008 as Bloc Québécois member for Longueuil—Pierre-Boucher, Quebec.
- Noël Dorion b. 1904 first elected in 1958 as Progressive Conservative member for Bellechasse, Quebec.
- Pierre Nérée Dorion b. 1816 first elected in 1872 as Liberal member for Drummond—Arthabaska, Quebec.
- George Dormer b. 1838 first elected in 1872 as Conservative member for Victoria South, Ontario.
- Ujjal Dosanjh b. 1947 first elected in 2004 as Liberal member for Vancouver South, British Columbia.
- Alexandre-Joseph Doucet b. 1880 first elected in 1923 as Conservative member for Kent, New Brunswick.
- George Doucett b. 1897 first elected in 1957 as Progressive Conservative member for Lanark, Ontario.
- Albert B. Douglas b. 1912 first elected in 1968 as Liberal member for Assiniboia, Saskatchewan.
- Crawford Douglas b. 1931 first elected in 1974 as Liberal member for Bruce, Ontario.
- James Lester Douglas b. 1881 first elected in 1940 as Liberal member for Queen's, Prince Edward Island.
- James McCrie Douglas b. 1867 first elected in 1909 as Liberal member for Strathcona, Alberta.
- James Moffat Douglas b. 1839 first elected in 1896 as Liberal member for Assiniboia East, Northwest Territories.
- John Carey Douglas b. 1874 first elected in 1917 as Unionist member for Cape Breton South and Richmond, Nova Scotia.
- Thomas Clement Douglas b. 1904 first elected in 1935 as CCF member for Weyburn, Saskatchewan.
- Robert Doull b. 1828 first elected in 1872 as Liberal-Conservative member for Pictou, Nova Scotia.
- Terry Dowdall first elected in 2019 as Conservative member for Simcoe—Grey, Ontario.
- Cliff Downey b. 1928 first elected in 1968 as Progressive Conservative member for Battle River, Alberta.
- Norman E. Doyle b. 1945 first elected in 1997 as Progressive Conservative member for St. John's East, Newfoundland and Labrador.
- Cyrille Doyon b. 1843 first elected in 1887 as Independent Liberal member for Laprairie, Quebec.

== Dr ==
- Henry Lumley Drayton b. 1869 first elected in 1919 as Conservative member for Kingston, Ontario.
- Earl Dreeshen b. 1953 first elected in 2008 as Conservative member for Red Deer, Alberta.
- George Alexander Drew b. 1826 first elected in 1867 as Liberal-Conservative member for Wellington North, Ontario.
- George Alexander Drew b. 1894 first elected in 1948 as Progressive Conservative member for Carleton, Ontario.
- Stan Dromisky b. 1931 first elected in 1993 as Liberal member for Thunder Bay—Atikokan, Ontario.
- Robert Earle Drope b. 1898 first elected in 1945 as Progressive Conservative member for Northumberland, Ontario.
- Claude Drouin b. 1956 first elected in 1997 as Liberal member for Beauce, Quebec.
- Francis Drouin b. 1983 first elected in 2015 as Liberal member for Glengarry—Prescott—Russell, Ontario.
- Noël Drouin b. 1912 first elected in 1958 as Progressive Conservative member for Dorchester, Quebec.
- Vincent Drouin b. 1932 first elected in 1962 as Liberal member for Argenteuil—Deux-Montagnes, Quebec.
- John Douglas Fraser Drummond b. 1860 first elected in 1921 as Progressive member for Middlesex West, Ontario.
- Charles Mills Drury b. 1912 first elected in 1962 as Liberal member for Saint-Antoine—Westmount, Quebec.
- Ken Dryden b. 1947 first elected in 2004 as Liberal member for York Centre, Ontario.
- John Andrew W. Drysdale b. 1926 first elected in 1958 as Progressive Conservative member for Burnaby—Richmond, British Columbia.

== Du–Dug ==
- Pamphile Réal Blaise Nugent Du Tremblay b. 1879 first elected in 1917 as Laurier Liberal member for Laurier—Outremont, Quebec.
- Antoine Dubé b. 1947 first elected in 1993 as Bloc Québécois member for Lévis, Quebec.
- Jean F. Dubé b. 1962 first elected in 1997 as Progressive Conservative member for Madawaska—Restigouche, New Brunswick.
- Jean-Eudes Dubé b. 1926 first elected in 1962 as Liberal member for Restigouche—Madawaska, New Brunswick.
- Matthew Dubé b. 1988 first elected in 2011 as New Democratic Party member for Beloeil—Chambly, Quebec.
- Paul-Léon Dubé b. 1892 first elected in 1949 as Independent Liberal member for Restigouche—Madawaska, New Brunswick.
- Joseph Adélard Dubeau b. 1873 first elected in 1904 as Liberal member for Joliette, Quebec.
- Jean-Guy Dubois b. 1948 first elected in 1980 as Liberal member for Lotbinière, Quebec.
- Lucien Dubois b. 1893 first elected in 1930 as Liberal member for Nicolet, Quebec.
- V. Florent Dubois b. 1906 first elected in 1958 as Progressive Conservative member for Richmond—Wolfe, Quebec.
- Emmanuel Dubourg b. 1958 first elected in 2013 as Liberal member for Bourassa, Quebec.
- Joseph Dubuc b. 1840 first elected in 1878 as Conservative member for Provencher, Manitoba.
- Julien-Édouard-Alfred Dubuc b. 1871 first elected in 1925 as Independent Liberal member for Chicoutimi, Quebec.
- Gilles Duceppe b. 1947 first elected in 1990 as Independent member for Laurier—Sainte-Marie, Quebec.
- Henri Jules Juchereau Duchesnay b. 1845 first elected in 1887 as Nationalist member for Dorchester, Quebec.
- Jean-Yves Duclos b. 1965 first elected in 2015 as Liberal member for Québec, Quebec.
- Louis Duclos b. 1939 first elected in 1974 as Liberal member for Montmorency, Quebec.
- William Duff b. 1872 first elected in 1917 as Laurier Liberal member for Lunenburg, Nova Scotia.
- Joseph James Duffus b. 1876 first elected in 1935 as Liberal member for Peterborough West, Ontario.
- Nicolas Dufour b. 1987 first elected in 2008 as Bloc Québécois member for Repentigny, Quebec.
- J.-Wilfrid Dufresne b. 1911 first elected in 1953 as Progressive Conservative member for Quebec West, Quebec.
- Joseph Dufresne b. 1805 first elected in 1867 as Conservative member for Montcalm, Quebec.
- Firmin Dugas b. 1830 first elected in 1871 as Conservative member for Montcalm, Quebec.
- François Octave Dugas b. 1852 first elected in 1900 as Liberal member for Montcalm, Quebec.
- Joseph Louis Euclide Dugas b. 1861 first elected in 1891 as Conservative member for Montcalm, Quebec.
- Joseph Duguay b. 1816 first elected in 1872 as Conservative member for Yamaska, Quebec.
- Joseph Léonard Duguay b. 1900 first elected in 1930 as Conservative member for Lake St. John, Quebec.
- Léo Duguay b. 1944 first elected in 1984 as Progressive Conservative member for St. Boniface, Manitoba.
- Terry Duguid first elected in 2015 as Liberal member for Winnipeg South, Manitoba.

== Duh–Duv ==
- Ronald J. Duhamel b. 1938 first elected in 1988 as Liberal member for St. Boniface, Manitoba.
- Cyrille Dumaine b. 1897 first elected in 1930 as Liberal member for Bagot, Quebec.
- Armand Dumas b. 1905 first elected in 1949 as Liberal member for Villeneuve, Quebec.
- Maurice Dumas b. 1927 first elected in 1993 as Bloc Québécois member for Argenteuil—Papineau, Quebec.
- Bernard Dumont b. 1928 first elected in 1962 as Social Credit member for Bellechasse, Quebec.
- Joseph Dumont b. 1847 first elected in 1878 as Liberal member for Kamouraska, Quebec.
- Eric Duncan b. 1987 first elected in 2019 as Conservative member for Stormont—Dundas—South Glengarry, Ontario.
- John Morris Duncan b. 1948 first elected in 1993 as Reform member for North Island—Powell River, British Columbia.
- Kirsty Duncan b. 1966 first elected in 2008 as Liberal member for Etobicoke North, Ontario.
- Linda Duncan b. 1949 first elected in 2008 as New Democratic member for Edmonton—Strathcona, Alberta.
- Matthew Robert Duncan b. 1863 first elected in 1921 as Conservative member for Grey North, Ontario.
- Joseph Rutherford Dundas b. 1836 first elected in 1882 as Conservative member for Victoria South, Ontario.
- Christopher Dunkin b. 1812 first elected in 1867 as Conservative member for Brome, Quebec.
- Charles Avery Dunning b. 1885 first elected in 1926 as Liberal member for Regina, Saskatchewan.
- Claude Duplain b. 1954 first elected in 2000 as Liberal member for Portneuf, Quebec.
- Suzanne Duplessis b. 1940 first elected in 1984 as Progressive Conservative member for Louis-Hébert, Quebec.
- Flavien Dupont b. 1847 first elected in 1882 as Conservative member for Bagot, Quebec.
- Raymond Dupont b. 1942 first elected in 1972 as Liberal member for Sainte-Marie, Quebec.
- Maurice Dupras b. 1923 first elected in 1970 as Liberal member for Labelle, Quebec.
- Hercule Dupré b. 1844 first elected in 1896 as Liberal member for St. Mary, Quebec.
- Maurice Dupré b. 1888 first elected in 1930 as Conservative member for Quebec West, Quebec.
- Hector Dupuis b. 1896 first elected in 1950 as Liberal member for St. Mary, Quebec.
- Vincent Dupuis b. 1889 first elected in 1929 as Liberal member for Laprairie—Napierville, Quebec.
- Yvon Dupuis b. 1926 first elected in 1958 as Liberal member for Saint-Jean—Iberville—Napierville, Quebec.
- Michel Dupuy b. 1930 first elected in 1993 as Liberal member for Laval West, Quebec.
- Gérard Duquet b. 1909 first elected in 1965 as Liberal member for Quebec East, Quebec.
- Alfred Duranleau b. 1871 first elected in 1930 as Conservative member for Chambly—Verchères, Quebec.
- Richard John Joseph Durante b. 1930 first elected in 1968 as Liberal member for Comox—Alberni, British Columbia.
- Eugène Durocher b. 1881 first elected in 1939 as Liberal member for St. James, Quebec.
- Joseph-Étienne Dussault b. 1884 first elected in 1925 as Liberal member for Lévis, Quebec.
- Pierre-Luc Dusseault b. 1991 first elected in 2011 as New Democratic Party member for Sherbrooke, Quebec.
- Scott Duvall b. 1956 first elected in 2015 as New Democratic Party member for Hamilton Mountain, Ontario.

== Dy ==
- Eugène Alphonse Dyer b. 1838 first elected in 1891 as Conservative member for Brome, Quebec.
- Rick Dykstra b. 1966 first elected in 2006 as Conservative member for St. Catharines, Ontario.
- Albert Dyment b. 1869 first elected in 1896 as Liberal member for Algoma, Ontario.
- Alfred Hutchinson Dymond b. 1827 first elected in 1874 as Liberal member for York North, Ontario.

== Dz ==
- Julie Dzerowicz b. 1979 first elected in 2015 as Liberal member for Davenport, Ontario.
