= CIMI =

CIMI may refer to:

- Catalina Island Marine Institute, a marine biology program for youth.
- CIMI-FM, a modern rock radio station in Quebec City, Quebec, Canada.
- Clinical Information Modelling Initiative, a community of interest focused on health care models.
- Cloud Infrastructure Management Interface, an information technology standard for cloud computing.
- Computer Interchange of Museum Information, a museum IT standards consortium.
