= Aristide Rompré =

Canadian politician

Member of Parliament for Portneuf
- In office March 1958 – June 1962
- Preceded by: Pierre Gauthier
- Succeeded by: Jean-Louis Frenette

Personal details
- Born: Aristide Stanislas Joseph Rompré; 1 August 1912 Saint-Ubalde, Quebec, Canada
- Died: 29 September 1976 (aged 64) Bernieres, Quebec, Canada
- Party: Progressive Conservative
- Spouse(s): Aline Dussault m. 2 July 1945
- Profession: furniture merchant

Aristide Stanislas Joseph Rompré (1 August 1912 – 29 September 1976) was a Canadian businessman and politician. Rompré served as a Progressive Conservative party member of the House of Commons of Canada. Born in Saint-Ubalde, Quebec, he was a furniture merchant by career.

Rompré served as mayor of Saint-Ubalde from 1949 to 1951, and again from 1953 to 1960.

After an unsuccessful attempt to unseat Pierre Gauthier at Portneuf in the 1957 federal election, Rompré won the riding in the following year's election. After completing his only federal term, the 24th Canadian Parliament, he left federal politics and did not campaign in another national election.

== Electoral record ==
1958 Canadian federal election: Portneuf
Party	Candidate	Votes	%	±%
Progressive Conservative	Aristide Rompré	11,386	53.2	+11.5
Liberal	(x)Pierre Gauthier	10,031	46.8	-11.5
Total valid votes		21,417	100.0	
