= Joël Godin =

Canadian politician

Joël Godin MP
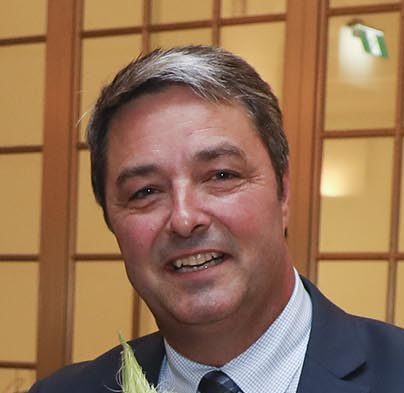
- Godin in 2017

Member of Parliament for Portneuf—Jacques-Cartier
- Incumbent
- Assumed office October 19, 2015
- Preceded by: Élaine Michaud

Personal details
- Born: March 14, 1965 (age 61) Beaupré, Quebec
- Party: Conservative (Federal); Liberal Party of Quebec (Provincial)
- Relatives: Louis-Philippe-Antoine Bélanger (grandfather)

Joël Godin MP (born March 14, 1965) is a Canadian politician, who was elected to the House of Commons of Canada in the 2015 election from the district of Portneuf—Jacques-Cartier. He is a member of the Conservative Party of Canada.

== Biography ==
He is a former municipal councillor in Saint-Joachim, Quebec. He describes himself as a progressive conservative.

At the time of the 2025 Canadian federal election, he lived in Saint-Augustin-de-Desmaures.

== Leadership contests ==
During the 2022 Conservative Party leadership election, Goudin endorsed Jean Charest and threatened to leave the party if Pierre Poilievre won. Following Poilevre's election, Godin stated he felt "very comfortable working with Pierre Poilievre" and that he wanted to congratulate him for his "beautiful and impressive victory".

He was elected vice chair of the Canadian House of Commons Standing Committee on Official Languages in the 45th Canadian Parliament in 2025.

== Electoral record ==
2025 Canadian federal election: Portneuf—Jacques-Cartier
Party	Candidate	Votes	%	±%
Conservative	Joël Godin	32,184	49.56	−2.79
Liberal	Antonin Leroux	18,865	29.05	+13.90
Bloc Québécois	Christian Hébert	11,606	17.87	−5.87
New Democratic	Félix Couture	1,034	1.59	−3.13
Green	Johann Queffelec	728	1.12	N/A
People's	Simon Frenette	524	0.81	−1.64
Total valid votes		64,941	98.88	
Total rejected ballots		734	1.12	-0.44
Turnout		65,675	74.43	+5.85
Eligible voters		88,236		
Conservative notional hold		Swing		−8.35
Source: Elections Canada
Note: number of eligible voters does not include voting day registrations.

2021 Canadian federal election: Portneuf—Jacques-Cartier
Party	Candidate	Votes	%	±%	Expenditures
Conservative	Joël Godin	33,657	51.6	+8.1	$44,464.37
Bloc Québécois	Christian Hébert	15,525	23.8	-0.5	$20,696.78
Liberal	Sani Diallo	10,068	15.4	-4.5	$5,520.89
New Democratic	David-Roger Gagnon	3,223	4.9	-0.9	$0.00
People's	Nash Mathieu	1,615	2.5	-0.5	$0.00
Free	Charle Fiset	638	1.0	N/A	$595.69
Rhinoceros	Tommy Pelletier	490	0.8	N/A	$0.00
Total valid votes/expense limit		65,216	98.4	–	$123,545.66
Total rejected ballots		1,034	1.6		
Turnout		66,250	69.0		
Eligible voters		96,079			
Conservative hold		Swing		+4.3	
Source: Elections Canada

2019 Canadian federal election: Portneuf—Jacques-Cartier
Party	Candidate	Votes	%	±%	Expenditures
Conservative	Joël Godin	28,110	43.46	-0.51	$37,463.57
Bloc Québécois	Mathieu Bonsaint	15,707	24.29	+13.55	$10,147.81
Liberal	Annie Talbot	12,876	19.91	-1.56	$41,965.44
New Democratic	David-Roger Gagnon	3,758	5.81	-16.24	$427.26
Green	Marie-Claude Gaudet	2,308	3.57	+1.8	$706.74
People's	Luca Abbatiello	1,915	2.96	–	$3,814.48
Total valid votes/expense limit		64,674	100.0		
Total rejected ballots		1,251	1.90	+0.51	
Turnout		65,925	70.94	-1.39	
Eligible voters		92,931			
Conservative hold		Swing		-7.03	
Source: Elections Canada

2015 Canadian federal election: Portneuf—Jacques-Cartier
Party	Candidate	Votes	%	±%	Expenditures
Conservative	Joël Godin	27,290	43.97	+16.2	$71,670.38
New Democratic	Élaine Michaud	13,686	22.05	-20.6	$76,976.38
Liberal	David Gauvin	13,322	21.47	+14.9	$48,792.76
Bloc Québécois	Raymond Harvey	6,665	10.74	-9.8	$11,313.73
Green	Johanne Morin	1,096	1.77	-0.6	–
Total valid votes/expense limit		62,059	100.0		$227,576.17
Total rejected ballots		781	1.39	–	
Turnout		62,840	72.33	–	
Eligible voters		86,884			
Conservative gain from New Democratic		Swing		+18.4*	
Source: Elections Canada: Swing is taken from André Arthur, an independent candidate supported by the Conservatives in the last election.
