= Joseph-Israël Tarte =

Canadian politician (1848–1907)

The Honourable Joseph-Israël Tarte PC
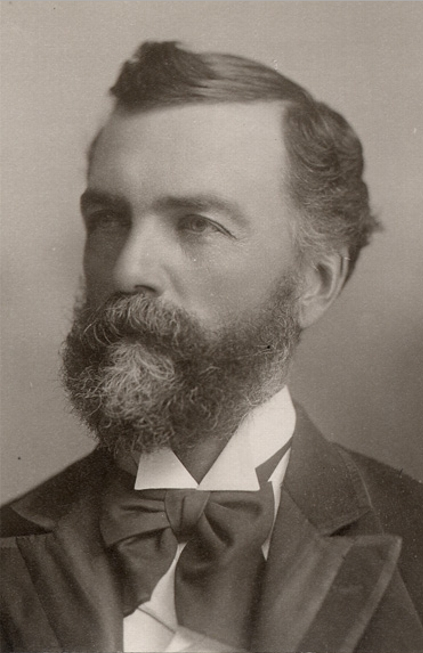
- Tarte, c. 1890

Member of the Canadian Parliament for Montmorency
- In office 1891–1892
- Preceded by: Louis-Georges Desjardins
- Succeeded by: Arthur Joseph Turcotte

Member of the Canadian Parliament for L'Islet
- In office 1893–1896
- Preceded by: Louis-Georges Desjardins
- Succeeded by: Alphonse-Arthur Miville Déchêne

Member of the Canadian Parliament for St. Johns—Iberville
- In office 1896–1900
- Preceded by: François Béchard
- Succeeded by: Louis Philippe Demers

Member of the Canadian Parliament for St. Mary
- In office 1900–1904
- Preceded by: Hercule Dupré
- Succeeded by: Camille Piché

Member of the Legislative Assembly of Quebec for Bonaventure
- In office 1877–1881
- Preceded by: Pierre-Clovis Beauchesne
- Succeeded by: Louis-Joseph Riopel

Personal details
- Born: January 11, 1848 Lanoraie, Canada East
- Died: December 18, 1907 (aged 59) Montreal, Quebec, Canada

Joseph-Israël Tarte PC (January 11, 1848 – December 18, 1907) was a Canadian politician and journalist.

== Career ==
Tarte came to prominence as editor of several newspapers, Le Canadien, L'Événement, La Patrie, and the Quebec Daily Mercury. He was initially a follower of Sir George-Étienne Cartier before hardening into a conservative ultramontanist supporter of Church intervention into politics but later became a Liberal and a critic of the Church.

In 1876, Tarte was in charge of the campaign to elect Hector Langevin to parliament and supported, in his published articles, the clergy's intervention in the by-election. Langevin was Cartier's successor as Quebec lieutenant to Sir John A. Macdonald and de facto leader of the federal Conservative Party in French Canada. A Supreme Court of Canada decision declared that sermons by the clergy during the by-election campaign had played an intimidating role termed influence indue spirituelle or "undue spiritual influence" - thus the court overturned the vote and called a new by-election which Langevin won by a reduced margin.

Tarte himself sat as a member of the Quebec legislative assembly from 1877 to 1881 in the riding of Bonaventure and made moderate Conservative Joseph-Adolphe Chapleau, Langevin's rival, a frequent target of both speeches and editorials. He was also charged with organizing the federal Conservative Party's campaign in the Quebec City region for the 1878 federal election

He reconciled with Chapleau but was left out of his Cabinet along with the rest of the ultramontanist faction when he became Premier of Quebec. Tarte chose not to run for re-election in 1881, partly due to being disconcerted by the Vatican's warnings against clerical influence in politics which would be synthesized in 1885 in the Encyclical Immortale Dei. By 1882 he had abandoned ultramontanism and returned to his earlier "Liberal-Conservative" position of moderation from which he criticised those who continued to hold an ultramontanist position.

Tarte became increasingly disillusioned in the Conservative Party due to the Conservative government's hostility or indifference to French Canada in issues such as the Manitoba Schools Question and the trial and execution of Louis Riel - while Tarte had supported crushing the Second Riel Rebellion he was troubled by the government's decision to allow Riel to hang. After briefly joining the Parti national, he joined the Liberal Party of Canada. He played the leading role in exposing the McGreevy-Langevin scandal that resulted in McGreevy's expulsion from the House of Commons for corruption and forcing the resignation from Cabinet of Langevin, his former mentor.

Tarte entered federal politics and he was elected to the House of Commons of Canada in the 1891 federal election as a Conservative. Once in parliament, however, he exposed the McGreevy-Langevin scandal which discredited the Conservative Party, forced Sir Hector Langevin's resignation from the Cabinet. Tarte was unseated in 1892 due to a court challenge to his election but re-entered parliament the next year as an independent and was soon invited by Wilfrid Laurier to join the Liberals.

In parliament, Tarte accused the Conservatives of bad faith in the Manitoba Schools Question and reneging on a promise to Manitoba's Archbishop Taché to intervene. When the Liberals took power following the 1896 federal election, Laurier appointed Tarte to Cabinet as Minister of Public Works. As such, Tarte dispensed patronage, helped solidify ties with the business community in Montreal and developed the Port of Montreal.

Later in his political career, Tarte opposed Canadian involvement in the Boer War and called for greater Canadian independence from Britain. Paradoxically, he later opposed Liberal policy on reciprocity campaigning instead for greater economic unity of the British Empire and higher tariffs. This resulted in Laurier dismissing Tarte in October 1902 for breaking Cabinet solidarity. Tarte's protectionism brought him back into the orbit of the Conservative Party, now led by Robert Borden and Tarte briefly became the Conservative Party's Quebec organizer for two by-elections but chose not to run for re-election himself in the 1904 federal election choosing to return to journalism. His flirtation with the Conservatives ended and Tarte supported Laurier editorially. Physically, he grew increasingly weaker until his death in 1907.

== Archives ==
There is a Joseph-Israël Tarte fonds at Library and Archives Canada.

== Electoral record ==
1896 Canadian federal election: Beauharnois
Party	Candidate	Votes	%	±%
Conservative	Joseph-Gédéon-Horace Bergeron	1,582		
Liberal	Joseph-Israël Tarte	1,534		

By-election on 5 January 1893
Party	Candidate	Votes
Independent	Joseph-Israël Tarte	acclaimed
