= Guy Côté =

Canadian politician and salesman

Guy Côté (born 30 December 1965) is a Canadian politician and salesman. Côté was the Member of Parliament for the riding of Portneuf—Jacques-Cartier from 2004–2006.

Born in Quebec City, Quebec, Côté has been involved in many non-profit organizations in Portneuf, among other things, serving as a School commissioner in Portneuf, Quebec (2003–2004) before being elected to the House of Commons of Canada in the 2004 federal election for the Bloc Québécois, a left-wing separatist party, in the riding of Portneuf—Jacques-Cartier. Côté is a former salesman. He worked briefly as a salesman for CKNU a local radio station of his riding. He has also been assistant to the former Bloc MP of Portneuf. During the 1980s, at the time of the beau risque and the Meech Lake constitutional reform, he was a member of the local association of the PC party in the riding of Langelier (now Quebec), under Gilles Loiselle, a strong believer in Canadian federalism.

After the 2004 election, Côté soon became an important player of the Bloc opposition in Parliament as assistant Finance critic for the Bloc. In September 2005, he became the Intergovernmental Affairs and Privy Council critic. He sat on the Finance committee, on the subcommittee on Fiscal Imbalance and on the Official Languages committee. According to www.howdtheyvote.ca, during the 38th Legislature, he was the new Quebec MP who spoke the most in the House of Communs and ranked 38th among all MPs.

Côté was defeated by one of Quebec City's most notorious shock-radio hosts, André Arthur, who ran as an independent. Arthur officially became a candidate on 2 January 2006, three weeks before election day, and spent less than $1000 for his campaign but ran an intensive pre-campaign every day for about two months during his morning and noon shows.

2004 Canadian federal election: Portneuf
Party	Candidate	Votes	%	±%	Expenditures
Bloc Québécois	Guy Côté	18,471	42.9	+7.7	$38,181
Liberal	(x)Claude Duplain	11,863	27.6	-13.2	$52,428
Conservative	Howard M. Bruce	9,251	21.5	-2.5	$16,810
Green	Pierre Poulin	1,925	4.5	–	$265
New Democratic	Jean-François Breton	1,540	3.6	–	
Total valid votes/expense limit		43,050	100.0	$76,720	

Note: Conservative vote is compared to the total of the Canadian Alliance vote and Progressive Conservative vote in 2000 election.

Parliament of Canada
Preceded by Claude Duplain	Member of Parliament from Portneuf; 2004-2006	Succeeded by André Arthur
