= Roch-Pamphile Vallée =

Canadian politician

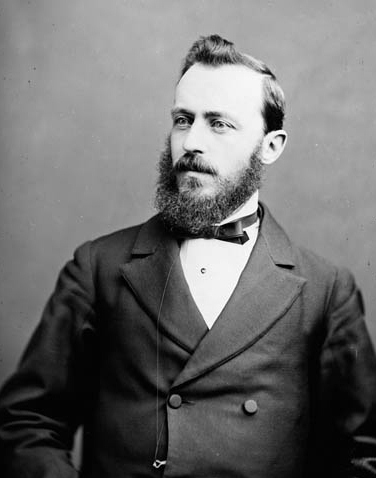

Member of the Canadian Parliament for Portneuf
- In office 1878–1882
- Preceded by: Esdras Alfred de St-Georges
- Succeeded by: Esdras Alfred de St-Georges

Personal details
- Born: May 28, 1848 Montmagny, Canada East
- Died: October 9, 1935 (aged 87)
- Party: Conservative

Roch-Pamphile Vallée (May 28, 1848 – October 9, 1935) was a journalist, newspaper editor and political figure in Quebec. He represented Portneuf in the House of Commons of Canada from 1878 to 1882 as a Conservative member.

He was born in Montmagny, Canada East, the son of Jean Stanislas Vallée, who took part in the Lower Canada Rebellion, and was educated at St. Anne's College. In 1871, Vallée published an unofficial weekly journal of debates in the Quebec legislative assembly, L'Écho de la session; an official journal of debates appeared in 1877. In 1873, he married Zoë Montmiry. He was editor for Le Courrier du Canada. In the 1877 election for the Quebec legislative assembly, Vallée tied with Alexandre Chauveau in the riding of Rimouski; the returning officer cast the deciding vote in favour of Chauveau. In the 1878 federal election, he was again defeated by the vote of the returning officer; however, a recount gave Vallée the seat by a margin of 33 votes. He ran unsuccessfully for reelection to the House of Commons in 1882 and 1891.

1891 Canadian federal election: Portneuf
Party	Candidate	Votes	%	±%
Liberal	Arthur Delisle	1,906	52.0	-2.1
Conservative	Roch-Pamphile Vallée	1,756	48.0	+2.1
Total valid votes		3,662	100.0	

1882 Canadian federal election: Portneuf
Party	Candidate	Votes	%	±%
Liberal	Esdras Alfred de St-Georges	1,491	50.5	+1.1
Conservative	(x)Roch-Pamphile Vallée	1,459	49.5	-1.1
Total valid votes		2,950	100.0	

1878 Canadian federal election: Portneuf
Party	Candidate	Votes	%	±%
Conservative	Roch-Pamphile Vallée	1,605	50.5	+7.2
Liberal	(x)Esdras Alfred de St-Georges	1,572	49.5	-7.2
Total valid votes		3,177	100.0	
