= André Arthur =

Canadian radio host and politician (1943–2022)

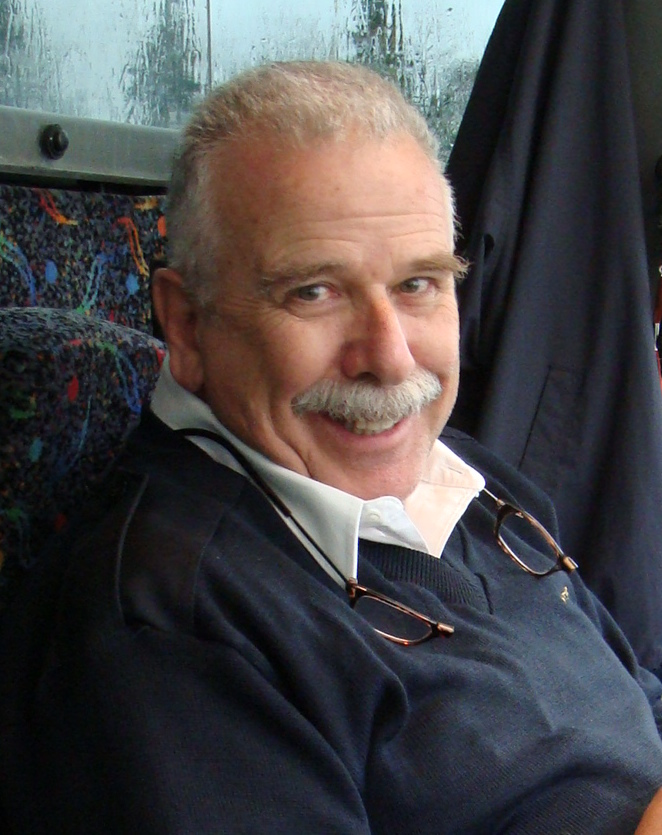

Member of Parliament for Portneuf—Jacques-Cartier
- In office 2006–2011
- Preceded by: Guy Côté
- Succeeded by: Élaine Michaud

Personal details
- Born: December 21, 1943 Quebec City, Quebec, Canada
- Died: May 8, 2022 (aged 78) Quebec City, Quebec, Canada
- Party: Independent
- Profession: Journalist, radio host

André Arthur (December 21, 1943 – May 8, 2022) was a Canadian radio host and politician. He was the independent Member of Parliament for the riding of Portneuf—Jacques-Cartier from 2006 to 2011. He has been described as the "godfather" of radio poubelle (trash radio), a style of politically conservative radio popular in Quebec City.

He was known for his outspoken style and anti-statist right-of-center politics in a province known for mainly supporting left-of-center policies, but has nonetheless earned widespread popularity, earning the nickname le Roi Arthur ("King Arthur"). Known for controversial comments, Arthur was fired from his radio hosting position in 2018 after referring to a road in the LGBT district of Quebec City as "AIDS Boulevard".

== Personal life ==
Both Arthur's father, René, and uncle, Gérard Arthur, were radio hosts. René and Gérard were Armenian immigrant children who came from Constantinople to Montreal in the 1910s, fleeing the Armenian genocide, with their parents and siblings, via New York City. According to Arthur, the family was mistakenly considered to be Jewish by some Montreal residents at the time, because their last name contained the name Isaac, thus being victims of antisemitism. Consequently, the family changed its name to Arthur, a French-sounding name, which was also André Arthur's grandfather's first name (he was alternatively known as Arthur Isakian or Arthur DerSahag, Sahag meaning Isaac in Armenian).

Arthur's mother was a Québécoise by the name of Tanguay, a name that originally came from Brittany to Quebec in the 17th century.

As a young adult, Arthur worked as a hockey referee. According to Arthur, this experience taught him how to accept being heavily criticized.

Arthur was divorced and has two children.

== Radio ==
Arthur began his radio career at CHRC in 1970. He has also appeared on CJRP, CKAC, CKVL, CJMF-FM, CJMS, CHOI-FM and, most recently (until December 22, 2005), at CKNU-FM and CIMI-FM, all French-language stations. In 2007, Arthur was briefly part of a morning show on CHEQ-FM with Marie Saint-Laurent as well as the web radio station Rockik.com.

Arthur's career has been marked by a number of lawsuits. He has been sued for defamation by two Quebec Premiers, Lucien Bouchard and Daniel Johnson Jr. He has also faced penalizing decisions by the Canadian Radio-television and Telecommunications Commission (CRTC) and the Canadian Broadcast Standards Council regarding several on-air statements he made which led to the non-renewal of the licence of CHOI-FM. His most recent gig, as morning and noon host for CKNU in Donnacona, Quebec, ended on December 22, 2005, soon after Genex Communications announced it was selling the station to RNC Media, which declined to renew his contract.

On November 17, 1998, during a broadcast on CKVL, Arthur attacked taxi drivers in Montreal, especially those who were "Arab and Haitian". According to the summary of facts presented in the Superior Court, Arthur denounced "their incompetence and filthiness, while suggesting they get their licenses by corruption and are somehow responsible for the deplorable state of this mode of transport in the city." On February 17, 2011, the Supreme Court ruled in favor of Arthur.

In January 2018, he was fired from BLVD 102.1 FM for referring to a road in the LGBT district of Quebec City as "AIDS Boulevard".

For several years, Arthur opened his radio show with the theme song from The Muppet Show.

== Television ==
From 1972 to 1979, in addition to being heard on CHRC, Arthur was a news anchor for the local evening news program at Télé-4 (CFCM-TV, a TVA affiliate) in Quebec City. On August 20, 2008, it was announced that Arthur would host a talk show on the TQS network, starting September 29; however, a federal election was called in the meantime, delaying the starting date. Arthur successfully ran for MP in the 2008 election.

TQS announced the show's cancellation on August 5, 2009.

=== Malenfant TV series ===
In December 2009, cable channel Séries+ announced it would broadcast in the winter of 2011 a four-part miniseries on Raymond Malenfant, produced by Ricardo Trogi. The role of Raymond Malenfant will be played by Luc Picard and Francis Cantin (Raymond Malenfant young adult). The role of André Arthur (1986, 1991 and 2001) will be played by Jean-François Porlier.

== Politics ==
André Arthur was a self-described libertarian, and his political views are generally in line with the libertarian ideology. He generally opposed the concept of government intervention in the economy, and supported tax cuts (as opposed to subsidies) as the most efficient way to promote economic growth and respect individual liberty.

He was also a noted admirer of the United States, which he perceived to be less intrusive in people's lives. Arthur claimed that if he were an American citizen he would never vote for George W. Bush as President – one factor being Arthur's opposition to the Iraq War. Nonetheless, Arthur considered George W. Bush (as well as Canadian Prime Minister Stephen Harper) to be very consistent, a quality that he admired.

Arthur was a federalist. He is known for his opposition to Quebec sovereignty, not so much because of any profound attachment to Canada, but because he feared independence would increase what he saw as the socialist tendencies of Quebec as a political entity. According to a number of Parti Québécois analysts, Arthur's influence was a significant cause of the lower-than-expected "Yes" vote in the Quebec City area in the 1995 referendum.

Arthur first ran for office as an independent candidate in the Louis-Hébert district in the 1994 Quebec provincial election. He finished second with 29% of the vote, behind Parti Québécois candidate Paul Bégin (39%).

In 1997, Arthur ran for the office of mayor of Sainte-Foy against incumbent Andrée Boucher. Boucher was re-elected and Arthur finished second, with 33% of the vote.

=== Electoral record ===
2011 Canadian federal election: Portneuf—Jacques-Cartier
| Party | Candidate | Votes | % | ±% | Expenditures |
|---|---|---|---|---|---|
| New Democratic | Élaine Michaud | 22,387 | 42.7 | +30.0 | |
| Independent | André Arthur | 14,594 | 27.8 | -5.8 | |
| Bloc Québécois | Richard Côté | 10,745 | 20.5 | -11.5 | |
| Liberal | Réjean Thériault | 3,463 | 6.6 | -9.7 | |
| Green | Claudine Delorme | 1,279 | 2.4 | -1.2 | |
| Total valid votes/expense limit | | 52,468 | 100.0 | | |
| Total rejected ballots | | 946 | 1.8 | -0.6 | |
| Turnout | | 53,414 | 66.2 | +5.4 | |
| Eligible voters | | 80,694 | – | – | |

2008 Canadian federal election: Portneuf—Jacques-Cartier
| Party | Candidate | Votes | % | ±% | Expenditures |
|---|---|---|---|---|---|
| Independent | André Arthur | 15,063 | 33.5 | -6.4 | $8,458 |
| Bloc Québécois | Richard Côté | 14,401 | 32.0 | +6.1 | $41,700 |
| Liberal | Stéphane Asselin | 7,320 | 16.3 | +11.4 | $4,855 |
| New Democratic | André Turgeon | 5,707 | 12.7 | +8.8 | $1,955 |
| Green | Nathan John Weatherdon | 1,452 | 3.2 | +0.4 | |
| Independent | Jean Paradis | 1,039 | 2.3 | – | $1,833 |
| Total valid votes/expense limit | | 44,982 | 100.0 | $85,693 | |
| Total rejected ballots | | 1,113 | 2.4 | | |
| Turnout | | 46,095 | 60.8 | | |
| Independent hold | | Swing | -6.2 | | |

2006 Canadian federal election: Portneuf—Jacques-Cartier
| Party | Candidate | Votes | % | ±% | Expenditures |
|---|---|---|---|---|---|
| Independent | André Arthur | 20,158 | 39.8 | – | $1,093 |
| Bloc Québécois | Guy Côté | 13,094 | 25.9 | -17.0 | $47,797 |
| Conservative | Howard Bruce | 11,472 | 22.7 | +1.2 | $60,326 |
| Liberal | Gilles Landry | 2,489 | 4.9 | -22.6 | $16,487 |
| New Democratic | Jean-Marie Fiset | 1,956 | 3.9 | +0.3 | $1,579 |
| Green | Jérôme Beaulieu | 1,431 | 2.8 | -1.6 | |
| Total valid votes/expense limit | | 50,600 | 100.0 | $79,151 | |

Arthur's first successful bid for office was in the 2006 Canadian federal election, when he was elected as an independent Member of Parliament for the Portneuf—Jacques-Cartier district of Quebec. Arthur officially became a candidate on January 2, 2006, three weeks before Election Day. Having the advantage of name recognition and running an intensive pre-campaign every day for about two months during his morning and noon shows, he used no campaign paraphernalia and spent only $924 on his campaign. Arthur boasted of being "the cheapest Member of Parliament in Canada", claiming to have spent less than any other elected candidate at this election.

While the 2006 federal election was not Arthur's first attempt to win political office, he claimed that bid was the only time he really wanted to be elected. According to Arthur, his goal in previous elections had been to divide the results.

In winning the riding, Arthur became the first truly independent and non-incumbent candidate to be elected to the House of Commons since Tony Roman won an Ontario district in 1984.

On January 25, 2006, in an interview with Anna Maria Tremonti, host of CBC Radio One's morning news program The Current, Arthur stated that he would not join any political party during the then-current parliament, but he did note that the policies of the governing Conservative Party of Canada best reflected his personal political beliefs and stances on many major issues. He also stated that he entered politics as an independent with the influence and record of non-affiliated MP Chuck Cadman, the most recent MP to be elected to the House of Commons as an independent, in mind. It was reported in May 2006 that he might consider joining the Conservatives, however he later denied this saying his comments had been misunderstood.

On November 30, 2006, Arthur announced in a press conference that he had been diagnosed with prostate cancer and would be receiving treatment at Quebec City's Hotel-Dieu hospital in the coming weeks. He also mentioned that despite the cancer, he would remain in his post as the MP for Portneuf—Jacques-Cartier.

Though an independent, Arthur was basically aligned with the Conservative ministry and consistently voted in its favor on confidence questions. As a result, the Conservative Party decided not to run a candidate against him in the 2008 and 2011 federal elections. This decision proved to be decisive in his 2008 re-election; Arthur retained the seat with only 33.5% of the vote, against 32% for Richard Coté of the Bloc Québécois.

In 2011, Globe and Mail noted in an interview that aired on CHOI-FM in Quebec City on Aug. 23, 2007, shortly after a Tory cabinet shuffle, directed some of his well known on-air venom toward Stephen Harper's new team. He called Peter MacKay, dismissing him as "a loser" and "a ridiculous character". Stated that Jim Prentice was "not a bad" minister who spent all his time solving problems for the Prime Minister and Bev Oda "lamentable – unable to find her behind with her two hands". However, Quebec MP Maxime Bernier, defended his party choice not to field a candidate during the 2011 election by stating "Absolutely not. He is an independent and he has his freedom of speech," and "Who doesn't make mistakes in life?" Arthur was defeated in 2011 by the New Democratic Party candidate, Élaine Michaud.

== Bus driver ==
While a Member of Parliament, Arthur worked as a tour bus driver for Intercar. He claimed that his position as an independent MP freed him from the obligation to attend caucuses and partisan social events, going as far as suggesting all MPs should get a second job to put them in touch with ordinary people. This earned him the criticism from his opponents, who noted Arthur had been absent from Parliament for nearly one-third of the votes since 2006, something for which Arthur was unapologetic.
