= Marc Ferland (politician) =

Canadian politician

Member of Parliament for Portneuf
- In office 1984–1993
- Preceded by: Rolland Dion
- Succeeded by: Pierre de Savoye

Personal details
- Born: 15 April 1942 (age 84) Quebec City, Quebec, Canada
- Party: Progressive Conservative
- Spouse(s): Michelle Simoneau m. 17 August 1968
- Profession: Industrial designer, project coordinator

Marc Ferland (born 15 April 1942 in Quebec City, Quebec) was a Progressive Conservative member of the House of Commons of Canada. He was an industrial designer and project coordinator by career.

Ferland's post-secondary education was at the Commercial and Industrial institute of Quebec. In politics, he represented the Quebec riding of Portneuf where he was first elected in the 1984 federal election and re-elected in 1988, therefore becoming a member in the 33rd and 34th Canadian Parliaments.

Ferland left federal politics when he was defeated in the 1993 federal election by Pierre de Savoye of the Bloc Québécois.

1993 Canadian federal election: Portneuf
Party	Candidate	Votes	%	±%
Bloc Québécois	Pierre de Savoye	23,880	53.6	
Liberal	Paulin Plamondon	10,269	23.1	-3.5
Progressive Conservative	(x)Marc Ferland	6,645	14.9	-42.4
Independent	René Matte	2,260	5.1	
Natural Law	Robert Royer	869	2.0	
New Democratic	John MacFarlane	626	1.4	-10.8
Total valid votes		44,549	100.0	

1988 Canadian federal election: Portneuf
Party	Candidate	Votes	%	±%
Progressive Conservative	(x)Marc Ferland	23,893	57.4	+6.3
Liberal	Paulin Plamondon	11,055	26.5	-11.4
New Democratic	Jean-Marie Fiset	5,100	12.2	+5.8
Green	Reynald Desrochers	1,607	3.9	
Total valid votes		41,655	100.0	

1984 Canadian federal election: Portneuf
Party	Candidate	Votes	%	±%
Progressive Conservative	Marc Ferland	23,797	51.1	+43.7
Liberal	(x)Rolland Dion	17,687	38.0	-45.9
New Democratic	Jacques Pelchat	3,012	6.5	-1.8
Rhinoceros	Jean Paradis	1,222	2.6	-1.5
Parti nationaliste	Georges-H. Marcotte	638	1.4	
Social Credit	Renée Roberge-Petitclerc	248	0.5	-5.3
Total valid votes		46,604	100.0	
