= Roland Godin =

Canadian politician (1926–2009)

- Official 1973 portrait

Member of Parliament for Portneuf
- In office November 1965 – May 1974
- Preceded by: Jean-Louis Frenette
- Succeeded by: Pierre Bussières

Personal details
- Born: 11 October 1926 Neuville, Quebec, Canada
- Died: 22 June 2009 (aged 82) Donnacona, Quebec, Canada
- Party: Social Credit
- Profession: Manager

Roland Godin (11 October 1926 – 22 June 2009) was a Ralliement créditiste and Social Credit party member of the House of Commons of Canada. He was a manager by career.

Godin was born in Neuville, Quebec. He was first elected to Parliament at the Portneuf riding in the 1965 general election and re-elected in the 1968 and 1972. From 1966 to 1971, his party was known as the Ralliement créditiste. Godin was defeated in the 1974 federal election by Pierre Bussières of the Liberal party.

He ran for the Ralliement créditiste du Québec in the 1976 provincial election and finished fourth against Liberal incumbent Michel Pagé in Portneuf.

Godin died at Donnacona, Quebec on 22 June 2009.

1974 Canadian federal election: Portneuf
Party	Candidate	Votes	%	±%
Liberal	Pierre Bussières	25,620	48.8	+5.9
Social Credit	(x)Roland Godin	19,456	37.1	-6.8
Progressive Conservative	Fernand Paquet	4,427	8.4	-0.2
New Democratic	Hervé Gauthier	2,980	5.7	+1.2
Total valid votes		52,483	100.0	

1972 Canadian federal election: Portneuf
Party	Candidate	Votes	%	±%
Social Credit	(x)Roland Godin	23,626	43.9	-4.4
Liberal	Claude Bernard	23,113	42.9	+6.1
Progressive Conservative	Jean-Luc Godin	4,664	8.7	-3.2
New Democratic	Rémi Morissette	2,430	4.5	+1.5
Total valid votes		53,833	100.0	
Note: Social Credit vote is compared to Ralliement créditiste vote in the 1968 election.
Source: lop.parl.ca

1968 Canadian federal election: Portneuf
Party	Candidate	Votes	%	±%
Ralliement créditiste	(x)Roland Godin	18,328	48.3	+14.7
Liberal	Jules Lapierre	13,965	36.8	+9.1
Progressive Conservative	Marcel Martineau	4,519	11.9	-5.6
New Democratic	Fernand Drolet	1,126	3.0	+2.0
Total valid votes		37,938	100.0	

1965 Canadian federal election: Portneuf
Party	Candidate	Votes	%	±%
Ralliement créditiste	Roland Godin	6,539	33.6	-22.8
Liberal	Albert Neilson	5,390	27.7	-5.6
Independent	(x)Jean-Louis Frenette	3,725	19.2	
Progressive Conservative	Gilbert Ouellet	3,400	17.5	+15.2
Independent PC	Louis-Philippe Bertrand	213	1.1	
New Democratic	Fernand Lepage	184	0.9	
Total valid votes		19,451	100.0	

Note: Ralliement créditiste vote is compared to Social Credit vote in the 1963 election.
