= Jean-Docile Brousseau =

Canadian politician

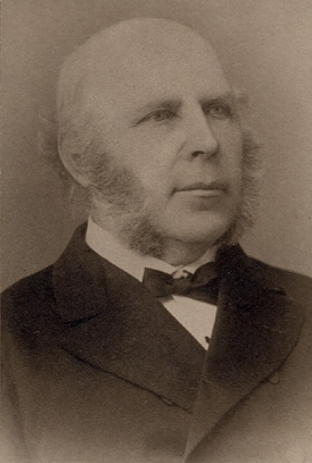
Jean-Docile Brousseau

Jean-Docile Brousseau (February 24, 1825 – July 28, 1908) was a Canadian politician and newspaper owner.

He was born in Quebec City in 1825. In 1855, he became the official printer for the archbishopric of Quebec and produced the Le Courrier du Canada, a religious newsletter, from 1857 to 1872. He was also involved in the production of Les Soirées canadiennes, a literary review.

In 1861, he was elected to the 7th Parliament of the Province of Canada representing Portneuf; he was re-elected in 1863. In 1867, he was elected as the federal Conservative Member of Parliament in the House of Commons of Canada representing Portneuf. He was defeated in the election in 1872.

He was then elected councillor for the Quebec City municipal government, a position in which he served from 1875 to 1880 and from 1882 to 1884. He served as mayor from 1880 to 1882. He also represented Portneuf in the Quebec Legislative Assembly from 1881 to 1885.

He died at Quebec in 1908 after suffering a paralytic stroke.

== Electoral record ==
1872 Canadian federal election: Portneuf
Party	Candidate	Votes	%	±%
Liberal	Esdras Alfred de St-Georges	1,179	51.1	
Conservative	Jean-Docile Brousseau	1,128	48.9	-9.9
Total valid votes		2,307	100.0	
Source: Canadian Elections Database

1867 Canadian federal election: Portneuf
Party	Candidate	Votes	%
Conservative	Jean-Docile Brousseau	1,027	58.8
Unknown	I. P. Dery	718	41.1
Unknown	Dubord	1	0.1
Total valid votes		1,746	100.0
Eligible voters		2,431	
Source: Canadian Parliamentary Guide, 1871
