= Georges Valade =

Canadian politician

Georges-Joseph Valade
- Official 1968 portrait

Member of Parliament for Sainte-Marie
- In office March 1958 – September 1972

Personal details
- Born: 25 March 1922 Baltimore, Maryland, United States
- Died: 12 September 1997 (aged 75) Montreal, Quebec, Canada
- Party: Progressive Conservative
- Profession: pharmacist

Georges-Joseph Valade (25 March 1922 – 12 September 1997) was a Progressive Conservative party member of the House of Commons of Canada.

Valade was born in Baltimore, Maryland, where his father was employed as a typographer. He received a degree in pharmacy from the University of Montreal, and took further studies at St. Francis Xavier University. He was a pharmacist by career.

He was first elected at the Sainte-Marie riding in the 1958 general election after two previous unsuccessful attempts to enter the House of Commons: in the 1953 election at Longueuil and in the 1957 election at Sainte-Marie.

Valade was re-elected at Sainte-Marie in the 1962, 1963, 1965, 1968 federal elections. After the 1968 election, he was the only remaining Progressive Conservative representative from Montreal.

He was defeated in the 1972 federal election by Raymond Dupont of the Liberal party. Another attempt to win the riding in the 1974 election was also unsuccessful. He died in Montreal in September 1997.

1957 Canadian federal election: Sainte-Marie
Party	Candidate	Votes
Liberal	Hector Dupuis	12,532
Progressive Conservative	Georges Valade	7,041
Co-operative Commonwealth	Eugène Dorais	752

1958 Canadian federal election: Sainte-Marie
Party	Candidate	Votes
Progressive Conservative	Georges Valade	11,635
Liberal	Hector Dupuis	9,662
Co-operative Commonwealth	Eugène Dorais	634
Independent	Eddy Brown	433

1962 Canadian federal election: Sainte-Marie
Party	Candidate	Votes
Progressive Conservative	Georges Valade	8,748
Liberal	Raymond Poupart	5,453
Candidat libéral des électeurs	J.-Édouard Pharon	1,836
Social Credit	Hervé Lajeunesse	1,364
New Democratic	Jean Coulombe	1,269
Independent PC	Georges Goyer	333

1963 Canadian federal election: Sainte-Marie
Party	Candidate	Votes
Progressive Conservative	Georges Valade	8,549
Liberal	Albert Caplette	6,043
Social Credit	Hervé Lajeunesse	4,271
New Democratic	Jean Coulombe	1,320

1965 Canadian federal election: Sainte-Marie
Party	Candidate	Votes
Progressive Conservative	Georges Valade	9,672
Liberal	Albert Caplette	5,201
New Democratic	Maurice Machet	1,385
Ralliement créditiste	Pierre Ménard	1,222

1968 Canadian federal election: Sainte-Marie
Party	Candidate	Votes
Progressive Conservative	Georges Valade	9,528
Liberal	Jean-Robert Ouellet	7,449
Independent Liberal	Albert Caplette	1,977
New Democratic	Marcel Paquin	1,149
Ralliement créditiste	Pierre Ménard	884
Independent	Paul Rollin	169
