= Élaine Michaud =

Canadian politician

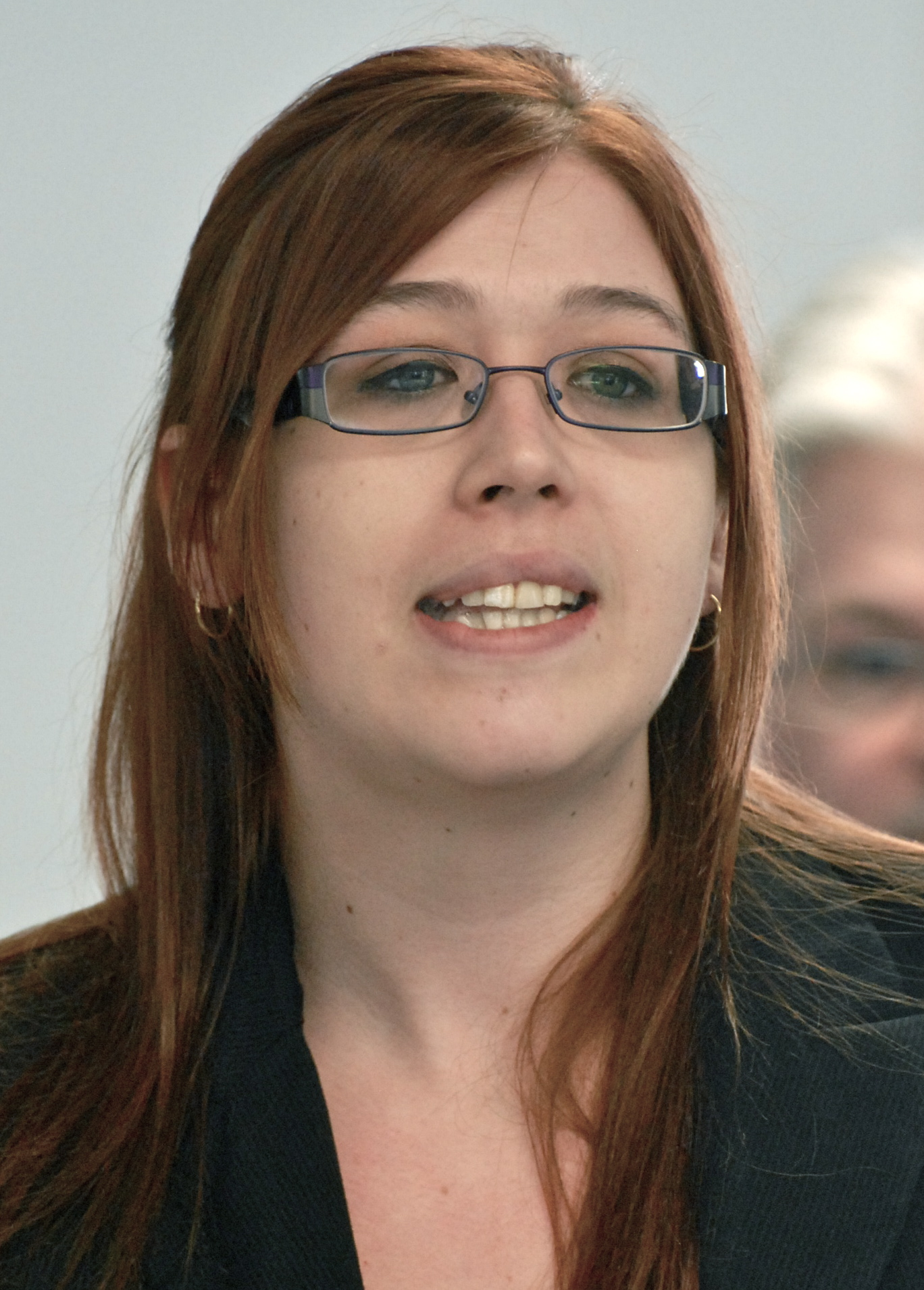

Member of Parliament for Portneuf—Jacques-Cartier
- In office May 2, 2011 – August 4, 2015
- Preceded by: André Arthur
- Succeeded by: Joël Godin

Personal details
- Born: October 17, 1985 (age 40) Longueuil, Quebec, Canada
- Party: New Democratic Party
- Profession: Information agent

Élaine Michaud (born October 17, 1985) is a Canadian politician, who was elected to the House of Commons of Canada in the 2011 election. She represented the Quebec electoral district of Portneuf—Jacques-Cartier as a member of the New Democratic Party. She was defeated in 2015 by Joël Godin of the Conservative Party.

== Biography ==
At the time of her election, she was a communications officer at the Régie de l'assurance maladie du Québec and a masters student at the École nationale d'administration publique.

Michaud won with 42.7% of the vote, defeating incumbent independent MP André Arthur by a margin of 7,793 votes. After the election, Arthur insulted her, saying he did not know what he could have said to people in his riding to avoid being beaten by a "fat girl with unclean teeth." Michaud responded saying that the comments reflected Arthur's "well-known pettiness" and stating she intended to "do politics differently."

Among Michaud's issues in the 41st Parliament were the issue of contaminated water in Shannon, Quebec, near the Valcartier military base in her riding and public opposition to the construction of Neuville Airport.

During the 41st Parliament, Michaud served as a member of the House Committees on Environment and Sustainable Development and Official Languages, and an associate member of the Committees on Finance, National Defence, and Veterans Affairs.

In the 2012 NDP leadership race following the death of Jack Layton, Michaud supported Peggy Nash. Michaud was defeated in the 2015 election by Conservative Joël Godin.

Following her defeat, Michaud stood for the presidency of the NDP after criticizing the leadership of Thomas Mulcair. Michaud was defeated by Toronto District School Board trustee Marit Stiles.

In 2026, Michaud endorsed Avi Lewis in that year's federal NDP leadership race.

== Electoral history ==
2015 Canadian federal election: Portneuf—Jacques-Cartier
Party	Candidate	Votes	%	±%	Expenditures
Conservative	Joël Godin	27,290	43.97	+16.2	$71,670.38
New Democratic	Élaine Michaud	13,686	22.05	-20.6	$76,976.38
Liberal	David Gauvin	13,322	21.47	+14.9	$48,792.76
Bloc Québécois	Raymond Harvey	6,665	10.74	-9.8	$11,313.73
Green	Johanne Morin	1,096	1.77	-0.6	–
Total valid votes/expense limit		62,059	100.0		$227,576.17
Total rejected ballots		781	1.39	–	
Turnout		62,840	72.33	–	
Eligible voters		86,884			
Conservative gain from New Democratic		Swing		+18.4*	
Source: Elections Canada: Swing is taken from André Arthur, an independent candidate supported by the Conservatives in the last election.

2011 Canadian federal election: Portneuf—Jacques-Cartier
Party	Candidate	Votes	%	±%	Expenditures
New Democratic	Élaine Michaud	22,387	42.7	+30.0	
Independent	André Arthur	14,594	27.8	-5.8	
Bloc Québécois	Richard Côté	10,745	20.5	-11.5	
Liberal	Réjean Thériault	3,463	6.6	-9.7	
Green	Claudine Delorme	1,279	2.4	-1.2	
Total valid votes/expense limit		52,468	100.0		
Total rejected ballots		946	1.8	-0.6	
Turnout		53,414	66.2	+5.4	
Eligible voters		80,694	–	–	
