= Pierre Gauthier (politician) =

Canadian politician

Member of the Legislative Assembly of Quebec for Portneuf
- In office 1927–1935

Member of Parliament for Portneuf
- In office January 1936 – March 1958

Personal details
- Born: 31 August 1894 Deschambault, Quebec, Canada
- Died: 6 July 1972 (aged 77) Montreal, Quebec, Canada
- Party: Liberal; Bloc populaire
- Spouse(s): Carmen Bélair (m. 24 September 1921)
- Profession: physician

Pierre Gauthier (31 August 1894 – 6 July 1972) was a Liberal party and a Bloc populaire member of the House of Commons of Canada.

Gauthier was born in Deschambault, Quebec and became a physician in 1921 after studies at Collège de Sainte-Anne-de-la-Pérade of the Séminaire de Québec then at Université Laval.

He entered provincial politics under the Quebec Liberal Party after winning a provincial by-election in Portneuf electoral district on 31 October 1927. He was re-elected to the Legislative Assembly of Quebec in the 1931 general election, then defeated in 1935. He was provincial Liberal party whip from 1931 to 1935.

On 27 January 1936, Gauthier won a federal by-election at the Portneuf riding, becoming a Liberal party member of Parliament. He was re-elected there in 1940. In 1941 and 1942, he served as a captain in the Royal Canadian Army Medical Corps. In 1943, he left the federal Liberals to join the Bloc populaire party which was opposed to World War II conscription.

Gauthier resigned his federal seat on 20 July 1944 in an unsuccessful bid to win a seat for the Quebec provincial wing of the Bloc populaire. Gauthier returned to the federal Liberals and was re-elected to Parliament in 1945. He was re-elected for further federal terms in 1949, 1953 and 1957. He was defeated in 1958 by Aristide Rompré of the Progressive Conservative party.

== Electoral record ==
1958 Canadian federal election: Portneuf
Party	Candidate	Votes	%	±%
Progressive Conservative	Aristide Rompré	11,386	53.2	+11.5
Liberal	(x)Pierre Gauthier	10,031	46.8	-11.5
Total valid votes		21,417	100.0	

1957 Canadian federal election: Portneuf
Party	Candidate	Votes	%	±%
Liberal	(x)Pierre Gauthier	11,328	58.3	-11.6
Progressive Conservative	Aristide Rompré	8,102	41.7	+11.6
Total valid votes		19,430	100.0	

1953 Canadian federal election: Portneuf
Party	Candidate	Votes	%	±%
Liberal	(x)Pierre Gauthier	12,701	69.9	+11.0
Progressive Conservative	Louis Tardivel	5,479	30.1	-2.5
Total valid votes		18,180	100.0	

1949 Canadian federal election: Portneuf
Party	Candidate	Votes	%	±%
Liberal	(x)Pierre Gauthier	10,932	58.8	+6.3
Progressive Conservative	Rosaire Chalifour	6,069	32.7	
Union des électeurs	J.-Henri Doré	1,579	8.5	+2.1
Total valid votes		18,580	100.0	

1945 Canadian federal election: Portneuf
Party	Candidate	Votes	%	±%
Liberal	(x)Pierre Gauthier	8,994	52.6	-15.0
Independent	Jean-Charles Magnan	7,021	41.0	
Social Credit	Raymond Dussault	1,094	6.4	
Total valid votes		17,109	100.0	

1940 Canadian federal election: Portneuf
Party	Candidate	Votes	%	±%
Liberal	(x)Pierre Gauthier	10,033	67.6	+28.9
Independent Liberal	Laurent Giroux	2,676	18.0	
National Government	J.-O. Pronovost	2,141	14.4	-18.9
Total valid votes		14,850	100.0	

Note: Change in popular vote is calculated from popular vote in the 1935 general election. "National Government" vote is compared to Conservative vote in 1935 election.

By-election on 27 January 1936 Cannon accepted an office of emolument under the Crown, 15 January 1936
Party	Candidate	Votes
Liberal	Pierre Gauthier	acclaimed

Parliament of Canada
Preceded by Lucien Cannon	Member of Parliament from Portneuf; 1936-1958	Succeeded by Aristide Rompré
