= Michel-Siméon Delisle =

Canadian politician

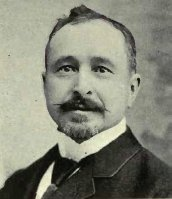

Member of the Canadian Parliament for Portneuf
- In office 1900–1930
- Preceded by: Henri-Gustave Joly de Lotbinière
- Succeeded by: Jules Desrochers

Personal details
- Born: September 27, 1856 Pointe-aux-Trembles, Portneuf County, Canada East
- Died: October 11, 1931 (aged 75)
- Party: Liberal

Michel-Siméon Delisle (September 27, 1856 – October 11, 1931) was a Canadian merchant and politician.

Born in Pointe-aux-Trembles, Portneuf County, Canada East, the son of Albert Delisle and Dina Bertrand, Delisle was educated in Quebec City. A merchant, he was Mayor of Portneuf for five years. He was first elected to the House of Commons of Canada at the general elections of 1900 and he was re-elected in 1904, 1908, 1911, 1917, 1925, and 1926. A Liberal, he served for almost 30 years for the riding of Portneuf.

== Electoral record ==
1926 Canadian federal election: Portneuf
Party	Candidate	Votes	%	±%
Liberal	(x)Michel-Siméon Delisle	6,308	54.5	+2.1
Independent Liberal	Herment Marcotte (alias Armand)	5,272	45.5	-25.8

1925 Canadian federal election: Portneuf
Party	Candidate	Votes	%	±%
Liberal	(x)Michel-Siméon Delisle	6,412	52.4	-28.4
Conservative	C.-Romulus Ducharme	3,405	27.8	+14.6
Independent Liberal	Herment Marcotte (alias Armand)	2,418	19.8	
Total valid votes		12,235	100.0	

1921 Canadian federal election: Portneuf
Party	Candidate	Votes	%
Liberal	(x)Michel-Siméon Delisle	9,021	80.8
Conservative	C.-Romulus Ducharme	1,475	13.2
Progressive	J. Quetton Fafard	665	6.0
Total valid votes		11,161	100.0

1917 Canadian federal election: Portneuf
Party	Candidate	Votes
Opposition (Laurier Liberals)	(x)Michel-Siméon Delisle	acclaimed

1911 Canadian federal election: Portneuf
Party	Candidate	Votes	%	±%
Liberal	(x)Michel-Siméon Delisle	2,868	57.7	+0.7
Conservative	Honoré Grenier	2,105	42.3	+2.3
Total valid votes		4,973	100.0	

1908 Canadian federal election: Portneuf
Party	Candidate	Votes	%	±%
Liberal	(x)Michel-Siméon Delisle	2,949	57.0	+1.7
Conservative	Lawrence Stafford	2,074	40.1	-2.5
Independent Liberal	Arthur Delisle	153	3.0	
Total valid votes		5,176	100.0	

1904 Canadian federal election: Portneuf
Party	Candidate	Votes	%	±%
Liberal	(x)Michel-Siméon Delisle	2,630	55.3	+0.4
Conservative	T.E. Voisard	2,026	42.6	-2.5
Unknown	C.N. Arcand	101	2.1	
Total valid votes		4,757	100.0	

1900 Canadian federal election: Portneuf
Party	Candidate	Votes	%	±%
Liberal	Michel-Siméon Delisle	2,444	54.9	+4.4
Conservative	G. Antoine Larue	2,009	45.1	-4.4
Total valid votes		4,453	100.0	
