= Camille Piché =

Canadian politician (1865–1909)

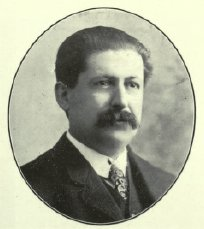

Member of the Canadian Parliament for St. Mary
- In office 1904–1906
- Preceded by: Joseph Israël Tarte
- Succeeded by: Médéric Martin

Personal details
- Born: April 27, 1865 St-Gabriel-de-Brandon, Canada East
- Died: April 6, 1909 (aged 43)
- Party: Liberal

Camille Piché KC (April 27, 1865 – April 6, 1909) was a Canadian lawyer and politician.

Born in St-Gabriel-de-Brandon, Canada East, the son of P. C. Piche, a notary and Sophie Desparois dite Champagne, Piché was educated at the Jacques Cartier Normal School and at Laval University in Montreal where he received a Bachelor of Laws degree. A member of the Quebec Bar, he practiced as a lawyer in Montreal with his firm Piche & Mercier. He was made a King's Counsel by the Quebec Government in 1904. He was elected to the House of Commons of Canada for the electoral district of St. Mary in the 1904 federal election. When a liberal appointed a Police Magistrate in Montreal, Piché was resigned in 1906.
