= Raymond Dupont =

Canadian politician

- Born: 27 December 1942 (age 82); Montreal, Quebec, Canada
- Occupations: technical and labour consultant, businessman and politician

Raymond Dupont (born 27 December 1942) was a Canadian technical and labour consultant, businessman and politician. He was a Liberal party member of the House of Commons of Canada.

He was elected at Sainte-Marie electoral district in the 1972 federal election and was re-elected there in 1974. In the 1979 election, he campaigned in the Chambly electoral district and won re-election there. After one more victory in the 1980 election, he was defeated in 1984 by Richard Grisé of the Progressive Conservative party. He made another unsuccessful attempt to re-enter federal politics in the 1988 election at Saint-Hubert riding.

Dupont served four consecutive terms of office from the 29th to the 32nd Canadian Parliaments.

1972 Canadian federal election: Sainte-Marie
Party	Candidate	Votes
Liberal	Raymond Dupont	7,945
Progressive Conservative	Georges Valade	7,826
Social Credit	André Bergeron	3,662
New Democratic	Roméo Richer	1,482
Independent	Louisette Dussault	713
Independent	Réginald (Reggie) Chartrand	696
Independent	Jean-Paul Boisjoli	161

1974 Canadian federal election: Sainte-Marie
Party	Candidate	Votes
Liberal	Raymond Dupont	8,300
Progressive Conservative	Georges Valade	7,902
Social Credit	Gaston Pleau	1,229
New Democratic	Roméo Richer	1,154
Marxist–Leninist	Jacques Bernard	296

Parliament of Canada
Preceded by Georges Valade	Member of Parliament for Sainte-Marie; 1972–1979	Succeeded by The electoral district was abolished in 1976.
Preceded by Bernard Loiselle	Member of Parliament for Chambly; 1979–1984	Succeeded by Richard Grisé
