= Esdras Alfred de St-Georges =

Canadian politician

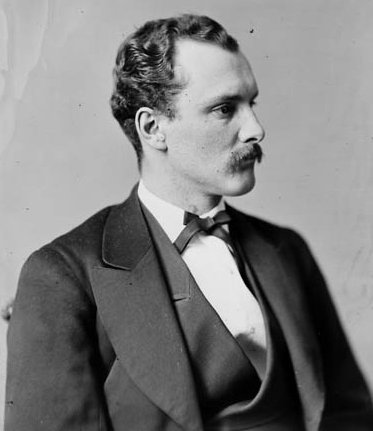

Member of the Canadian Parliament for Portneuf
- In office 1872–1878
- Preceded by: Jean-Docile Brousseau
- Succeeded by: Roch-Pamphile Vallée
- In office 1882–1890
- Preceded by: Roch-Pamphile Vallée
- Succeeded by: Arthur Delisle

Personal details
- Born: August 4, 1849 Cap-Santé, Canada East
- Died: June 19, 1890 (aged 40) Cap-Santé, Quebec, Quebec
- Party: Liberal

Esdras Alfred de St-Georges (August 4, 1849 – June 19, 1890) was a Quebec lawyer, medical doctor and political figure. He represented Portneuf in the House of Commons of Canada from 1872 to 1878 and from 1882 to 1890 as a Liberal member.

He was born in Cap-Santé, Canada East, the son of Laurent Aurez de St-Georges and Adelaine Allsopp who was the daughter of George Waters Allsopp. He received the degree of M.D. from Victoria College in Cobourg, Ontario and a degree in law from the Université Laval. He practised law at Quebec City and was also a governor of the College of Surgeons and Physicians of Lower Canada. In 1875, de St-Georges married Laura, the daughter of Isidore Thibaudeau. He was elected again in 1878 but unseated after an appeal; he also ran unsuccessfully in the riding of Montmorency in 1880. De St-Georges died in office in 1890 at Cap-Santé.

1887 Canadian federal election: Portneuf
Party	Candidate	Votes	%	±%
Liberal	(x)Esdras Alfred de St-Georges	1,962	54.2	+3.6
Conservative	Ed. Juchereau Duchesnay	1,661	45.8	-3.6
Total valid votes		3,623	100.0	

1882 Canadian federal election: Portneuf
Party	Candidate	Votes	%	±%
Liberal	Esdras Alfred de St-Georges	1,491	50.5	+1.1
Conservative	(x)Roch-Pamphile Vallée	1,459	49.5	-1.1
Total valid votes		2,950	100.0	

1878 Canadian federal election: Portneuf
Party	Candidate	Votes	%	±%
Conservative	Roch-Pamphile Vallée	1,605	50.5	+7.2
Liberal	(x)Esdras Alfred de St-Georges	1,572	49.5	-7.2
Total valid votes		3,177	100.0	

1878 Canadian federal election: Portneuf
Party	Candidate	Votes	%	±%
Conservative	Roch-Pamphile Vallée	1,605	50.5	+7.2
Liberal	(x)Esdras Alfred de St-Georges	1,572	49.5	-7.2
Total valid votes		3,177	100.0	

1874 Canadian federal election: Portneuf
Party	Candidate	Votes	%	±%
Liberal	(x)Esdras Alfred de St-Georges	1,421	56.7	+5.6
Conservative	J. Belleau	1,086	43.3	-5.6
Total valid votes		2,507	100.0	
Source: lop.parl.ca

1872 Canadian federal election: Portneuf
Party	Candidate	Votes	%	±%
Liberal	Esdras Alfred de St-Georges	1,179	51.1	
Conservative	Jean-Docile Brousseau	1,128	48.9	-9.9
Total valid votes		2,307	100.0	
Source: Canadian Elections Database
