= Pierre de Savoye =

Canadian politician

Pierre de Savoye (born 12 November 1942 in Montreal, Quebec) was a member of the House of Commons of Canada from 1993 to 2000. He is a professor and consultant by career.

He was elected in the Portneuf electoral district under the Bloc Québécois party in the 1993 and 1997 federal elections, thus serving in the 35th and 36th Canadian Parliaments. Pierre de Savoye left Canadian politics in 2000 as he did not seek a third term in that year's federal election.

== Electoral record ==
1997 Canadian federal election: Portneuf
Party	Candidate	Votes	%	±%
Bloc Québécois	(x)Pierre de Savoye	18,615	43.3	-10.3
Liberal	Raynald Samson	12,674	29.5	+6.4
Progressive Conservative	Raymond McBain	10,587	24.6	+9.7
New Democratic	Majella Desmeules	1,112	2.6	+1.2
Total valid votes		42,988	100.0	

1993 Canadian federal election: Portneuf
Party	Candidate	Votes	%	±%
Bloc Québécois	Pierre de Savoye	23,880	53.6	
Liberal	Paulin Plamondon	10,269	23.1	-3.5
Progressive Conservative	(x)Marc Ferland	6,645	14.9	-42.4
Independent	René Matte	2,260	5.1	
Natural Law	Robert Royer	869	2.0	
New Democratic	John MacFarlane	626	1.4	-10.8
Total valid votes		44,549	100.0	

Parliament of Canada
Preceded by Marc Ferland	Member of Parliament from Portneuf; 1993–2000	Succeeded by Claude Duplain
