= Marie Saint-Laurent =

Canadian radio host

Marie Saint-Laurent is a radio co-host, based in Quebec City, Canada. She could be heard on XM Satellite radio on a daily basis on Jeff Fillion's Radio Pirate show.

Saint-Laurent holds a B.A. in geography from Université Laval. She was first hired by CHOI-FM in 1999 after winning a contest. She has been Jeff Fillion's sidekick since. Her distinctive voice is her key asset, which could be categorized as being lower than average pitch wise.

She, and Fillion, were fired from CHOI-FM during the Sophie Chiasson case, in an attempt for CHOI-FM to send a clear message to the federal government in order to preserve the station's license.

In 2005, she became an organizer for the Conservative Party of Canada. She was named communication manager for Christian Paradis, M.P. for Mégantic—L'Érable.

Later in 2005, Saint-Laurent was hired to co-host Radio Pirate along with Fillion. She is no longer part of the show.
