= Hector Dupuis =

Canadian politician

Member of Parliament for St. Mary
- In office October 1950 – August 1953

Member of Parliament for Sainte-Marie
- In office August 1953 – March 1958

Personal details
- Born: 13 February 1896 Montreal, Quebec, Canada
- Died: 12 November 1967 (aged 71)
- Party: Liberal
- Profession: agent, businessman, insurance broker

Hector Dupuis (13 February 1896 – 12 November 1967) was a Liberal party and Reconstruction Party member of the House of Commons of Canada. He was born in Montreal, Quebec and became an agent, businessman and insurance broker by career.

Dupuis made an unsuccessful attempt to win federal office as a Reconstruction Party candidate at St. Mary riding in the 1935 federal election. His next campaign was as a Liberal candidate in a by-election at St. Mary on 16 October 1950 where he won a seat in Parliament. After his riding was renamed Sainte-Marie in 1952, he was re-elected for successive full terms in 1953 and 1957 then defeated by Georges Valade of the Progressive Conservative party in the 1958 election.

Having been awarded an MBE on July 1, 1946, Dupuis later returned the honour in response to the members of the Beatles receiving the same distinction in 1965.

1953 Canadian federal election: Sainte-Marie
| Party | Candidate | Votes |
|---|---|---|
| Liberal | Hector Dupuis | 16,288 |
| Progressive Conservative | Jean-Paul Boisjoly | 5,033 |
| Co-operative Commonwealth | Samuel Daoust | 553 |
| Labor–Progressive | Roger Messier | 241 |

1957 Canadian federal election: Sainte-Marie
| Party | Candidate | Votes |
|---|---|---|
| Liberal | Hector Dupuis | 12,532 |
| Progressive Conservative | Georges Valade | 7,041 |
| Co-operative Commonwealth | Eugène Dorais | 752 |
