= Arthur Delisle =

Canadian politician

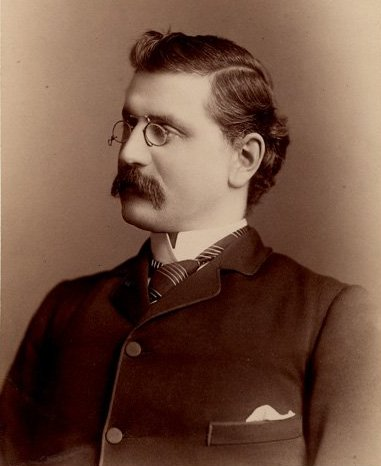

Member of the Canadian Parliament for Portneuf
- In office 1891–1896
- Preceded by: Esdras Alfred de St-Georges
- Succeeded by: Henri-Gustave Joly de Lotbinière

Personal details
- Born: March 15, 1859 Portneuf, Canada East
- Died: April 10, 1936 (aged 77) Montreal, Quebec, Canada
- Party: Liberal

Arthur Delisle, KC (March 15, 1859 – April 10, 1936) was a lawyer and political figure in Quebec. He represented Portneuf in the House of Commons of Canada from 1891 to 1896 as a Liberal member.

He was born in Portneuf, Canada East, the son of Jean Delisle and Anathalie Frenette. Delisle was educated at Laval, the Séminaire de Québec and the Université Laval. He was admitted to the Quebec bar in 1883 and set up practice in Quebec City. In 1890, Delisle married Blanche Hudon. He was one of the editors for l'Union Libérale. In 1896, he moved to Montreal and set up practice there. Delisle was named King's Counsel in 1898. He ran unsuccessfully for the same seat in the House of Commons in 1908 as an Independent Liberal. In 1929, he was named registrar for the bankruptcy court in Montreal district. Delisle died in Montreal at the age of 77.

1891 Canadian federal election: Portneuf
| Party | Candidate | Votes | % | ±% |
|---|---|---|---|---|
| Liberal | Arthur Delisle | 1,906 | 52.0 | -2.1 |
| Conservative | Roch-Pamphile Vallée | 1,756 | 48.0 | +2.1 |
| Total valid votes | | 3,662 | 100.0 | |
