= CIMI-FM =

Former radio station in Quebec City, Quebec

Quebec City, Quebec; Canada
- Frequency: 103.7 MHz

Programming
- Format: talk radio / modern rock

Ownership
- Owner: Radio Charlesbourg Haute-Saint-Charles

History
- First air date: 10 August 2001
- Last air date: 23 July 2008

Technical information
- Power: 20 watts

CIMI-FM was a French-language talk radio and modern rock radio station in Quebec City, Quebec, Canada. The station broadcast on 103.7 MHz and broadcasts from the borough of Charlesbourg.

== History ==
The non-profit organization which manages the radio station was registered in December 1999 by three young promoters, Philippe Bélanger, Dominique Tessier, Pierre-Luc Dancause, and the board of directors sat for the first time in January 2000. During the summer of 2000, a business plan was assembled, a technical study carried out and an application for a broadcast license was filed with the Canadian Radio-television and Telecommunications Commission (CRTC). On 5 March 2001, the CRTC granted the license and the station began broadcasting on 10 August of the same year at 4:15 p.m.

In the beginning, 24-year-old Philippe Bélanger was program director and hosted the station's launch. The station would broadcast exclusively French-language music during the day, and English Canadian, American, and British alternative rock in the evening and overnight.

On 2 July 2002, André Arthur took to the microphone at CIMI after he was dismissed from CJMF-FM ("FM 93") in November 2001. Arthur then signed with CKNU in Donnacona (now CHXX-FM) in August 2002, where the program would now originate and be simulcast to CIMI. Between 2002 and 2005, in spite of relatively good ratings, the station's weak signal made it hard to keep sponsors, as Genex was more interested in bringing advertisers to CKNU, to the detriment of the small Charlesbourg community radio station. As CIMI accumulated complaints, and telecommunications giants like Astral Media (past owner of the now-defunct CHRC) and Cogeco (FM 93) accused the small station of not respecting its broadcasting mandate, they began to lose advertising revenue. François Beaulé (formerly of CHRC) directed the station from 2003 until the summer of 2005. The station now offered programming more focused on "talk radio" and has as its slogan "la radio qui vous parle à Québec" ("Radio which talks to you in Quebec City").

In October 2005, CKNU was sold to RNC Media, the transaction was approved before the holidays, and everyone was laid off. CIMI lost its programming, but it applied for an increase in power and an antenna relocation, along with a frequency change to 106.9 MHz. This application was refused by the CRTC, and the frequency was obtained by Corus Entertainment to serve Trois-Rivières in order to move CHLN-FM from AM to FM.

This small community radio station was sued by local radio personality Robert Gillet who claimed three million dollars for defamation, after André Arthur spoke extensively about the Scorpion case, a scandal which has embroiled Gillet, having been found guilty in a court trial of having sex with a minor for a fee. In February 2006, CIMI was targeted by another lawsuit on behalf of a lawyer from Quebec following allegations by entertainer Roby Moreault.

CIMI-FM ceased programs 23 July 2008, citing financial and legal troubles. The CRTC cancelled CIMI-FM's license on 5 September 2012, after a lack of communication between the CRTC and the contact person for the station since its 2008 closure.

== Audience ==
The audience of CIMI-FM 103.7 was generally different depending on the time of day. Programs like L'Alternative, Rebelles and Moreault dans le Retour was targeted to a very large audience (males 25–54). Mornings, CIMI was aimed to an older audience with programs like Hier Encore (men and women 55+). As the day progresses the audience becomes younger in the evening (males 18–25) as it plays hard rock music.

In 2003, the Canadian polling company SOM found that more than 100,000 people in the Quebec City Area listened to CIMI-FM, and that over 190,000 people knew of or have heard of the station.
