= Claude Duplain =

Canadian politician

His Worship Claude Duplain

Mayor of Saint-Raymond
- Incumbent
- Assumed office November 7, 2021
- Preceded by: Daniel Dion

Member of Parliament for Portneuf
- In office November 27, 2000 – June 27, 2004
- Preceded by: Pierre de Savoye
- Succeeded by: Guy Côté

Personal details
- Born: January 10, 1954 (age 72) Saint-Raymond, Quebec
- Party: Liberal
- Profession: Entrepreneurship

Claude Duplain (born January 10, 1954) is a Canadian politician.

He was elected as the Member of Parliament for Portneuf, as the candidate of the Liberal Party of Canada, during the 37th Parliament (which sat from January 2001 through May 2004). During that time he served as a member of the Standing Committee on Agriculture and Agri-Food and the Standing Committee on Canadian Heritage.

Claude Duplain has been president of Construction du Grand Portneuf, a general construction company, since 1996. He is deeply involved in the economic development of the region of Portneuf.

From 1993 to 1996, he was president and shareholder of Construction du Grand Portneuf. He was a project estimator and manager for the Joseph Linteau & Sons company (1992–1993) and also a manager for Magasin Rona in Saint-Raymond-de-Portneuf (1986–1992). He worked as a designer for the architectural firm Beaudet, Nolet & Arcam Inc, and also for VariaHab which specializes in prefabricated houses.

He completed an architectural technical design course in 1971 after terminating his secondary education in 1970. He took further training in marketing, accounting, data processing, first aid and English.

Duplain was elected as mayor of Saint-Raymond, Quebec in the 2021 mayoral election.

== Electoral record ==
2004 Canadian federal election: Portneuf
Party	Candidate	Votes	%	±%	Expenditures
Bloc Québécois	Guy Côté	18,471	42.9	+7.7	$38,181
Liberal	(x)Claude Duplain	11,863	27.6	-13.2	$52,428
Conservative	Howard M. Bruce	9,251	21.5	-2.5	$16,810
Green	Pierre Poulin	1,925	4.5	–	$265
New Democratic	Jean-François Breton	1,540	3.6	–	
Total valid votes/expense limit		43,050	100.0	$76,720	

Note: Conservative vote is compared to the total of the Canadian Alliance vote and Progressive Conservative vote in 2000 election.

2000 Canadian federal election: Portneuf
Party	Candidate	Votes	%	±%
Liberal	Claude Duplain	17,877	40.8	+11.3
Bloc Québécois	Patrice Dallaire	15,444	35.2	-8.1
Alliance	Howard Bruce	6,699	15.3	
Progressive Conservative	François Dion	3,819	8.7	-15.9
Total valid votes		43,839	100.0	

Parliament of Canada
Preceded by Pierre de Savoye	Member of Parliament from Portneuf; 2000-2004	Succeeded by Guy Côté
