= Rolland Dion =

Canadian politician

Rolland Dion (5 July 1938 – 4 June 2011) was the mayor of Saint-Raymond, Quebec, which was also his birthplace. He was also a former Liberal party member of the House of Commons of Canada. He was a businessman by career.

He was mayor of Saint-Raymond from 1973 to 1979. He won the riding of Portneuf in the 1979 federal election and was re-elected there in 1980. Dion was defeated in 1984 by Marc Ferland of the Progressive Conservative party. He served in the 31st and 32nd Canadian Parliaments. He served again as mayor of Saint-Raymond from 2006 until his death in 2011.

== Electoral record ==
1984 Canadian federal election: Portneuf
| Party | Candidate | Votes | % | ±% |
|---|---|---|---|---|
| Progressive Conservative | Marc Ferland | 23,797 | 51.1 | +43.7 |
| Liberal | (x)Rolland Dion | 17,687 | 38.0 | -45.9 |
| New Democratic | Jacques Pelchat | 3,012 | 6.5 | -1.8 |
| Rhinoceros | Jean Paradis | 1,222 | 2.6 | -1.5 |
| Parti nationaliste | Georges-H. Marcotte | 638 | 1.4 | |
| Social Credit | Renée Roberge-Petitclerc | 248 | 0.5 | -5.3 |
| Total valid votes | | 46,604 | 100.0 | |

1980 Canadian federal election: Portneuf
| Party | Candidate | Votes | % | ±% |
|---|---|---|---|---|
| Liberal | (x)Rolland Dion | 29,234 | 73.9 | +10.2 |
| New Democratic | Robert Ferland | 3,285 | 8.3 | +4.9 |
| Progressive Conservative | Christian Légaré | 2,905 | 7.3 | -1.8 |
| Social Credit | Bernard Lapointe | 2,320 | 5.9 | -15.1 |
| Rhinoceros | M. Chrétien M. Paquette | 1,634 | 4.1 | +1.7 |
| Union populaire | Richard Corbeil | 204 | 0.5 | +0.1 |
| Total valid votes | | 39,582 | 100.0 | |
lop.parl.ca

1979 Canadian federal election: Portneuf
| Party | Candidate | Votes | % | ±% |
|---|---|---|---|---|
| Liberal | Rolland Dion | 25,297 | 63.6 | +14.8 |
| Social Credit | Bernard Lapointe | 8,330 | 20.9 | -16.1 |
| Progressive Conservative | Armand Caron | 3,620 | 9.1 | +0.7 |
| New Democratic | Renée Brisson | 1,346 | 3.4 | -2.3 |
| Rhinoceros | Réjane Mame Bujold | 985 | 2.5 | |
| Union populaire | O'H Ls Gingras | 184 | 0.5 | |
| Total valid votes | | 39,762 | 100.0 | |

Parliament of Canada
| Preceded by Pierre Bussières | Member of Parliament from Portneuf; 1979–1984 | Succeeded by Marc Ferland |
