= Saint-Augustin—Portneuf—Jacques-Cartier =

Federal electoral district in Quebec, Canada

Quebec electoral district
- Interactive map of riding boundaries from the 2025 federal election

Federal electoral district
- Legislature: House of Commons
MP
Joël Godin
Conservative
- District created: 1867
- First contested: 1867
- Last contested: 2025
- District webpage: profile, map

Demographics
- Population (2011): 104,394
- Electors (2025): 88,236
- Area (km²): 7,617
- Pop. density (per km²): 13.7
- Census division(s): La Jacques-Cartier, Portneuf, Quebec City
- Census subdivision(s): Saint-Augustin-de-Desmaures, Saint-Raymond, Pont-Rouge, Stoneham-et-Tewkesbury, Sainte-Catherine-de-la-Jacques-Cartier, Donnacona, Shannon, Neuville, Cap-Santé, Portneuf

Saint-Augustin—Portneuf—Jacques-Cartier (French pronunciation: [pɔʁnœf ʒak kaʁtje]; formerly known as Portneuf—Jacques-Cartier and Portneuf) is a federal electoral district in Quebec, Canada, that has been represented in the House of Commons of Canada since 1867. Its population in 2001 was 87,141. It is currently represented by Joël Godin of the Conservative Party of Canada.

== Demographics ==
According to the 2021 Canadian census, 2023 representation order

Race: 96.5% White, 1.8% Indigenous
Languages: 97.1% French, 2.7% English
Religions: 72.4% Christian (65.5% Catholic, 6.9% Other) 27.0% None
Median income: $47,600 (2020)
Average income: $55,650 (2020)

== Geography ==
The district includes the Regional County Municipalities of Portneuf and La Jacques-Cartier as well as the municipality of Saint-Augustin-de-Desmaures. The main communities are Saint-Augustin-de-Desmaures, Donnacona, Lac-Beauport, Neuville, Pont-Rouge, Shannon, Stoneham-et-Tewkesbury, Saint-Raymond, Sainte-Catherine-de-la-Jacques-Cartier, and Deschambault-Grondines. Its area is 7,617 km^{2}.

== History ==
The electoral district was created in the British North America Act 1867 as "Portneuf". It was renamed "Portneuf—Jacques-Cartier" on September 1, 2004.

The Conservative Party did not run a candidate in Portneuf—Jacques-Cartier in the 2008 and 2011 elections as incumbent independent André Arthur was a self-described libertarian who consistently voted with and supported the Conservative Party in the House of Commons.

There were no changes to this riding during the 2012 electoral redistribution.

Following the 2022 Canadian federal electoral redistribution, it lost the municipalities of Lac-Beauport and Sainte-Brigitte-de-Laval to Montmorency—Charlevoix.

The riding's name was changed to Saint-Augustin—Portneuf—Jacques-Cartier as part of Bill C-25 of the 45th Canadian Parliament.

=== Members of Parliament ===
This riding has elected the following members of the House of Commons of Canada:

Parliament	Years	Member	Party
Portneuf
1st	1867–1872	Jean-Docile Brousseau	Conservative
2nd	1872–1874	Esdras Alfred de St-Georges	Liberal
3rd	1874–1878	Esdras Alfred de St-Georges	Liberal
4th	1878–1882	Roch-Pamphile Vallée	Conservative
5th	1882–1887	Esdras Alfred de St-Georges	Liberal
6th	1887–1891	Esdras Alfred de St-Georges	Liberal
7th	1891–1896	Arthur Delisle	Liberal
8th	1896–1896	Henri-Gustave Joly de Lotbinière	Liberal
8th	1896–1900	Henri-Gustave Joly de Lotbinière	Liberal
9th	1900–1904	Michel-Siméon Delisle	Liberal
10th	1904–1908	Michel-Siméon Delisle	Liberal
11th	1908–1911	Michel-Siméon Delisle	Liberal
12th	1911–1917	Michel-Siméon Delisle	Liberal
13th	1917–1921	Michel-Siméon Delisle	Liberal
14th	1921–1925	Michel-Siméon Delisle	Liberal
15th	1925–1926	Michel-Siméon Delisle	Liberal
16th	1926–1930	Michel-Siméon Delisle	Liberal
17th	1930–1935	Jules Desrochers	Liberal
18th	1935–1936	Lucien Cannon	Liberal
18th	1936–1940	Pierre Gauthier	Liberal
19th	1940–1943	Pierre Gauthier	Liberal
19th	1943–1945	Pierre Gauthier	Bloc populaire
20th	1945–1949	Pierre Gauthier	Liberal
21st	1949–1953	Pierre Gauthier	Liberal
22nd	1953–1957	Pierre Gauthier	Liberal
23rd	1957–1958	Pierre Gauthier	Liberal
24th	1958–1962	Aristide Rompré	Progressive Conservative
25th	1962–1963	Jean-Louis Frenette	Social Credit
26th	1963–1963	Jean-Louis Frenette	Social Credit
26th	1963–1965	Jean-Louis Frenette	Ralliement créditiste
27th	1965–1968	Roland Godin	Ralliement créditiste
28th	1968–1971	Roland Godin	Ralliement créditiste
28th	1971–1972	Roland Godin	Social Credit
29th	1972–1974	Roland Godin	Social Credit
30th	1974–1979	Pierre Bussières	Liberal
31st	1979–1980	Rolland Dion	Liberal
32nd	1980–1984	Rolland Dion	Liberal
33rd	1984–1988	Marc Ferland	Progressive Conservative
34th	1988–1993	Marc Ferland	Progressive Conservative
35th	1993–1997	Pierre de Savoye	Bloc Québécois
36th	1997–2000	Pierre de Savoye	Bloc Québécois
37th	2000–2004	Claude Duplain	Liberal
38th	2004–2006	Guy Côté	Bloc Québécois
Portneuf—Jacques-Cartier
39th	2006–2008	André Arthur	Independent
40th	2008–2011	André Arthur	Independent
41st	2011–2015	Élaine Michaud	New Democratic
42nd	2015–2019	Joël Godin	Conservative
43rd	2019–2021	Joël Godin	Conservative
44th	2021–2025	Joël Godin	Conservative
45th	2025–present	Joël Godin	Conservative

== Election results ==
=== Portneuf—Jacques-Cartier ===
2025 Canadian federal election: Portneuf—Jacques-Cartier
Party	Candidate	Votes	%	±%	Expenditures
Conservative	Joël Godin	32,184	49.56	−2.79	$42,260.40
Liberal	Antonin Leroux	18,865	29.05	+13.90	$16,154.83
Bloc Québécois	Christian Hébert	11,606	17.87	−5.87	$14,420.81
New Democratic	Félix Couture	1,034	1.59	−3.13	$0.00
Green	Johann Queffelec	728	1.12	N/A	$0.00
People's	Simon Frenette	524	0.81	−1.64	$139.30
Total valid votes		64,941	98.88	+0.44	$133,388.38
Total rejected ballots		734	1.12	–0.44	
Turnout		65,675	74.43	+5.85	
Eligible voters		88,236			
Conservative notional hold		Swing		−8.35	
Source: Elections Canada
Note: number of eligible voters does not include voting day registrations.

2021 federal election redistributed results
Party	Vote	%
Conservative	29,771	52.35
Bloc Québécois	13,501	23.74
Liberal	8,614	15.15
New Democratic	2,686	4.72
People's	1,392	2.45
Free	530	0.93
Rhinoceros	380	0.67
Total valid votes	56,874	98.44
Rejected ballots	902	1.56
Registered voters/ estimated turnout	84,241	68.58

2021 Canadian federal election: Portneuf—Jacques-Cartier
Party	Candidate	Votes	%	±%	Expenditures
Conservative	Joël Godin	33,657	51.6	+8.1	$44,464.37
Bloc Québécois	Christian Hébert	15,525	23.8	-0.5	$20,696.78
Liberal	Sani Diallo	10,068	15.4	-4.5	$5,520.89
New Democratic	David-Roger Gagnon	3,223	4.9	-0.9	$0.00
People's	Nash Mathieu	1,615	2.5	-0.5	$0.00
Free	Charle Fiset	638	1.0	N/A	$595.69
Rhinoceros	Tommy Pelletier	490	0.8	N/A	$0.00
Total valid votes/expense limit		65,216	98.4	–	$123,545.66
Total rejected ballots		1,034	1.6		
Turnout		66,250	69.0		
Eligible voters		96,079			
Conservative hold		Swing		+4.3	
Source: Elections Canada

2019 Canadian federal election: Portneuf—Jacques-Cartier
Party	Candidate	Votes	%	±%	Expenditures
Conservative	Joël Godin	28,110	43.46	-0.51	$37,463.57
Bloc Québécois	Mathieu Bonsaint	15,707	24.29	+13.55	$10,147.81
Liberal	Annie Talbot	12,876	19.91	-1.56	$41,965.44
New Democratic	David-Roger Gagnon	3,758	5.81	-16.24	$427.26
Green	Marie-Claude Gaudet	2,308	3.57	+1.8	$706.74
People's	Luca Abbatiello	1,915	2.96	–	$3,814.48
Total valid votes/expense limit		64,674	100.0		
Total rejected ballots		1,251	1.90	+0.51	
Turnout		65,925	70.94	-1.39	
Eligible voters		92,931			
Conservative hold		Swing		-7.03	
Source: Elections Canada

2015 Canadian federal election: Portneuf—Jacques-Cartier
Party	Candidate	Votes	%	±%	Expenditures
Conservative	Joël Godin	27,290	43.97	+16.2	$71,670.38
New Democratic	Élaine Michaud	13,686	22.05	-20.6	$76,976.38
Liberal	David Gauvin	13,322	21.47	+14.9	$48,792.76
Bloc Québécois	Raymond Harvey	6,665	10.74	-9.8	$11,313.73
Green	Johanne Morin	1,096	1.77	-0.6	–
Total valid votes/expense limit		62,059	100.0		$227,576.17
Total rejected ballots		781	1.39	–	
Turnout		62,840	72.33	–	
Eligible voters		86,884			
Conservative gain from New Democratic		Swing		+18.4*	
Source: Elections Canada: Swing is taken from André Arthur, an independent candidate supported by the Conservatives in the last election.

2011 Canadian federal election: Portneuf—Jacques-Cartier
Party	Candidate	Votes	%	±%	Expenditures
New Democratic	Élaine Michaud	22,387	42.7	+30.0	
Independent	André Arthur	14,594	27.8	-5.8	
Bloc Québécois	Richard Côté	10,745	20.5	-11.5	
Liberal	Réjean Thériault	3,463	6.6	-9.7	
Green	Claudine Delorme	1,279	2.4	-1.2	
Total valid votes/expense limit		52,468	100.0		
Total rejected ballots		946	1.8	-0.6	
Turnout		53,414	66.2	+5.4	
Eligible voters		80,694	–	–	

2008 Canadian federal election: Portneuf—Jacques-Cartier
Party	Candidate	Votes	%	±%	Expenditures
Independent	André Arthur	15,063	33.5	-6.4	$8,458
Bloc Québécois	Richard Côté	14,401	32.0	+6.1	$41,700
Liberal	Stéphane Asselin	7,320	16.3	+11.4	$4,855
New Democratic	André Turgeon	5,707	12.7	+8.8	$1,955
Green	Nathan John Weatherdon	1,452	3.2	+0.4	
Independent	Jean Paradis	1,039	2.3	–	$1,833
Total valid votes/expense limit		44,982	100.0	$85,693	
Total rejected ballots		1,113	2.4		
Turnout		46,095	60.8		
Independent hold		Swing	-6.2		

2006 Canadian federal election: Portneuf—Jacques-Cartier
Party	Candidate	Votes	%	±%	Expenditures
Independent	André Arthur	20,158	39.8	–	$1,093
Bloc Québécois	Guy Côté	13,094	25.9	-17.0	$47,797
Conservative	Howard Bruce	11,472	22.7	+1.2	$60,326
Liberal	Gilles Landry	2,489	4.9	-22.6	$16,487
New Democratic	Jean-Marie Fiset	1,956	3.9	+0.3	$1,579
Green	Jérôme Beaulieu	1,431	2.8	-1.6	
Total valid votes/expense limit		50,600	100.0	$79,151	

=== Portneuf ===
2004 Canadian federal election: Portneuf
Party	Candidate	Votes	%	±%	Expenditures
Bloc Québécois	Guy Côté	18,471	42.9	+7.7	$38,181
Liberal	(x)Claude Duplain	11,863	27.6	-13.2	$52,428
Conservative	Howard M. Bruce	9,251	21.5	-2.5	$16,810
Green	Pierre Poulin	1,925	4.5	–	$265
New Democratic	Jean-François Breton	1,540	3.6	–	
Total valid votes/expense limit		43,050	100.0	$76,720	

Note: Conservative vote is compared to the total of the Canadian Alliance vote and Progressive Conservative vote in 2000 election.

2000 Canadian federal election: Portneuf
Party	Candidate	Votes	%	±%
Liberal	Claude Duplain	17,877	40.8	+11.3
Bloc Québécois	Patrice Dallaire	15,444	35.2	-8.1
Alliance	Howard Bruce	6,699	15.3	
Progressive Conservative	François Dion	3,819	8.7	-15.9
Total valid votes		43,839	100.0	

1997 Canadian federal election: Portneuf
Party	Candidate	Votes	%	±%
Bloc Québécois	(x)Pierre de Savoye	18,615	43.3	-10.3
Liberal	Raynald Samson	12,674	29.5	+6.4
Progressive Conservative	Raymond McBain	10,587	24.6	+9.7
New Democratic	Majella Desmeules	1,112	2.6	+1.2
Total valid votes		42,988	100.0	

1993 Canadian federal election: Portneuf
Party	Candidate	Votes	%	±%
Bloc Québécois	Pierre de Savoye	23,880	53.6	
Liberal	Paulin Plamondon	10,269	23.1	-3.5
Progressive Conservative	(x)Marc Ferland	6,645	14.9	-42.4
Independent	René Matte	2,260	5.1	
Natural Law	Robert Royer	869	2.0	
New Democratic	John MacFarlane	626	1.4	-10.8
Total valid votes		44,549	100.0	

1988 Canadian federal election: Portneuf
Party	Candidate	Votes	%	±%
Progressive Conservative	(x)Marc Ferland	23,893	57.4	+6.3
Liberal	Paulin Plamondon	11,055	26.5	-11.4
New Democratic	Jean-Marie Fiset	5,100	12.2	+5.8
Green	Reynald Desrochers	1,607	3.9	
Total valid votes		41,655	100.0	

1984 Canadian federal election: Portneuf
Party	Candidate	Votes	%	±%
Progressive Conservative	Marc Ferland	23,797	51.1	+43.7
Liberal	(x)Rolland Dion	17,687	38.0	-45.9
New Democratic	Jacques Pelchat	3,012	6.5	-1.8
Rhinoceros	Jean Paradis	1,222	2.6	-1.5
Parti nationaliste	Georges-H. Marcotte	638	1.4	
Social Credit	Renée Roberge-Petitclerc	248	0.5	-5.3
Total valid votes		46,604	100.0	

1980 Canadian federal election: Portneuf
Party	Candidate	Votes	%	±%
Liberal	(x)Rolland Dion	29,234	73.9	+10.2
New Democratic	Robert Ferland	3,285	8.3	+4.9
Progressive Conservative	Christian Légaré	2,905	7.3	-1.8
Social Credit	Bernard Lapointe	2,320	5.9	-15.1
Rhinoceros	M. Chrétien M. Paquette	1,634	4.1	+1.7
Union populaire	Richard Corbeil	204	0.5	+0.1
Total valid votes		39,582	100.0	
lop.parl.ca

1979 Canadian federal election: Portneuf
Party	Candidate	Votes	%	±%
Liberal	Rolland Dion	25,297	63.6	+14.8
Social Credit	Bernard Lapointe	8,330	20.9	-16.1
Progressive Conservative	Armand Caron	3,620	9.1	+0.7
New Democratic	Renée Brisson	1,346	3.4	-2.3
Rhinoceros	Réjane Mame Bujold	985	2.5	
Union populaire	O'H Ls Gingras	184	0.5	
Total valid votes		39,762	100.0	

1974 Canadian federal election: Portneuf
Party	Candidate	Votes	%	±%
Liberal	Pierre Bussières	25,620	48.8	+5.9
Social Credit	(x)Roland Godin	19,456	37.1	-6.8
Progressive Conservative	Fernand Paquet	4,427	8.4	-0.2
New Democratic	Hervé Gauthier	2,980	5.7	+1.2
Total valid votes		52,483	100.0	

1972 Canadian federal election: Portneuf
Party	Candidate	Votes	%	±%
Social Credit	(x)Roland Godin	23,626	43.9	-4.4
Liberal	Claude Bernard	23,113	42.9	+6.1
Progressive Conservative	Jean-Luc Godin	4,664	8.7	-3.2
New Democratic	Rémi Morissette	2,430	4.5	+1.5
Total valid votes		53,833	100.0	
Note: Social Credit vote is compared to Ralliement créditiste vote in the 1968 election.
Source: lop.parl.ca

1968 Canadian federal election: Portneuf
Party	Candidate	Votes	%	±%
Ralliement créditiste	(x)Roland Godin	18,328	48.3	+14.7
Liberal	Jules Lapierre	13,965	36.8	+9.1
Progressive Conservative	Marcel Martineau	4,519	11.9	-5.6
New Democratic	Fernand Drolet	1,126	3.0	+2.0
Total valid votes		37,938	100.0	

1965 Canadian federal election: Portneuf
Party	Candidate	Votes	%	±%
Ralliement créditiste	Roland Godin	6,539	33.6	-22.8
Liberal	Albert Neilson	5,390	27.7	-5.6
Independent	(x)Jean-Louis Frenette	3,725	19.2	
Progressive Conservative	Gilbert Ouellet	3,400	17.5	+15.2
Independent PC	Louis-Philippe Bertrand	213	1.1	
New Democratic	Fernand Lepage	184	0.9	
Total valid votes		19,451	100.0	

Note: Ralliement créditiste vote is compared to Social Credit vote in the 1963 election.

1963 Canadian federal election: Portneuf
Party	Candidate	Votes	%	±%
Social Credit	(x)Jean-Louis Frenette	11,473	56.5	+1.4
Liberal	Andrée-Robert Rivard	6,776	33.3	+8.9
Independent PC	Grégoire Martel	1,616	8.0	
Progressive Conservative	René-Paul-Joseph Plourde	459	2.3	-18.3
Total valid votes		20,324	100.0	

1962 Canadian federal election: Portneuf
Party	Candidate	Votes	%	±%
Social Credit	Jean-Louis Frenette	12,089	55.0	
Liberal	J.-Gérard Maltais	5,377	24.5	-22.4
Progressive Conservative	Louis Dussault	4,510	20.5	-32.6
Total valid votes		21,976	100.0	

1958 Canadian federal election: Portneuf
Party	Candidate	Votes	%	±%
Progressive Conservative	Aristide Rompré	11,386	53.2	+11.5
Liberal	(x)Pierre Gauthier	10,031	46.8	-11.5
Total valid votes		21,417	100.0	

1957 Canadian federal election: Portneuf
Party	Candidate	Votes	%	±%
Liberal	(x)Pierre Gauthier	11,328	58.3	-11.6
Progressive Conservative	Aristide Rompré	8,102	41.7	+11.6
Total valid votes		19,430	100.0	

1953 Canadian federal election: Portneuf
Party	Candidate	Votes	%	±%
Liberal	(x)Pierre Gauthier	12,701	69.9	+11.0
Progressive Conservative	Louis Tardivel	5,479	30.1	-2.5
Total valid votes		18,180	100.0	

1949 Canadian federal election: Portneuf
Party	Candidate	Votes	%	±%
Liberal	(x)Pierre Gauthier	10,932	58.8	+6.3
Progressive Conservative	Rosaire Chalifour	6,069	32.7	
Union des électeurs	J.-Henri Doré	1,579	8.5	+2.1
Total valid votes		18,580	100.0	

1945 Canadian federal election: Portneuf
Party	Candidate	Votes	%	±%
Liberal	(x)Pierre Gauthier	8,994	52.6	-15.0
Independent	Jean-Charles Magnan	7,021	41.0	
Social Credit	Raymond Dussault	1,094	6.4	
Total valid votes		17,109	100.0	

1940 Canadian federal election: Portneuf
Party	Candidate	Votes	%	±%
Liberal	(x)Pierre Gauthier	10,033	67.6	+28.9
Independent Liberal	Laurent Giroux	2,676	18.0	
National Government	J.-O. Pronovost	2,141	14.4	-18.9
Total valid votes		14,850	100.0	

Note: Change in popular vote is calculated from popular vote in the 1935 general election. "National Government" vote is compared to Conservative vote in 1935 election.

By-election on January 27, 1936 Cannon accepted an office of emolument under the Crown, January 15, 1936
Party	Candidate	Votes
Liberal	Pierre Gauthier	acclaimed

1935 Canadian federal election: Portneuf
Party	Candidate	Votes	%	±%
Liberal	Lucien Cannon	5,981	38.6	-13.2
Conservative	J.-Achille Joli-Coeur	5,155	33.3	-14.9
Independent Liberal	Bona Dussault	4,281	27.7	
Independent Liberal	C.-Lucien Plamondon	64	0.4	
Total valid votes		15,481	100.0	

1930 Canadian federal election: Portneuf
Party	Candidate	Votes	%	±%
Liberal	Jules Desrochers	7,813	51.8	-2.6
Conservative	J.-Alfred Foley	7,262	48.2	
Total valid votes		15,075	100.0	

1926 Canadian federal election: Portneuf
Party	Candidate	Votes	%	±%
Liberal	(x)Michel-Siméon Delisle	6,308	54.5	+2.1
Independent Liberal	Herment Marcotte (alias Armand)	5,272	45.5	-25.8

1925 Canadian federal election: Portneuf
Party	Candidate	Votes	%	±%
Liberal	(x)Michel-Siméon Delisle	6,412	52.4	-28.4
Conservative	C.-Romulus Ducharme	3,405	27.8	+14.6
Independent Liberal	Herment Marcotte (alias Armand)	2,418	19.8	
Total valid votes		12,235	100.0	

1921 Canadian federal election: Portneuf
Party	Candidate	Votes	%
Liberal	(x)Michel-Siméon Delisle	9,021	80.8
Conservative	C.-Romulus Ducharme	1,475	13.2
Progressive	J. Quetton Fafard	665	6.0
Total valid votes		11,161	100.0

1917 Canadian federal election: Portneuf
Party	Candidate	Votes
Opposition (Laurier Liberals)	(x)Michel-Siméon Delisle	acclaimed

1911 Canadian federal election: Portneuf
Party	Candidate	Votes	%	±%
Liberal	(x)Michel-Siméon Delisle	2,868	57.7	+0.7
Conservative	Honoré Grenier	2,105	42.3	+2.3
Total valid votes		4,973	100.0	

1908 Canadian federal election: Portneuf
Party	Candidate	Votes	%	±%
Liberal	(x)Michel-Siméon Delisle	2,949	57.0	+1.7
Conservative	Lawrence Stafford	2,074	40.1	-2.5
Independent Liberal	Arthur Delisle	153	3.0	
Total valid votes		5,176	100.0	

1904 Canadian federal election: Portneuf
Party	Candidate	Votes	%	±%
Liberal	(x)Michel-Siméon Delisle	2,630	55.3	+0.4
Conservative	T.E. Voisard	2,026	42.6	-2.5
Unknown	C.N. Arcand	101	2.1	
Total valid votes		4,757	100.0	

1900 Canadian federal election: Portneuf
Party	Candidate	Votes	%	±%
Liberal	Michel-Siméon Delisle	2,444	54.9	+4.4
Conservative	G. Antoine Larue	2,009	45.1	-4.4
Total valid votes		4,453	100.0	

Note: Change in popular vote is calculated from popular vote in the 1896 general election.

By-election on July 30, 1896 Joly de Lotbinière was appointed Controller of Inland Revenue, July 11, 1896
Party	Candidate	Votes
Liberal	(x)Henri-Gustave Joly de Lotbinière	acclaimed

1896 Canadian federal election: Portneuf
Party	Candidate	Votes	%	±%
Liberal	Henri-Gustave Joly de Lotbinière	2,086	50.4	-1.6
Conservative	L. Stafford	2,050	49.6	+1.6
Total valid votes		4,136	100.0	

1891 Canadian federal election: Portneuf
Party	Candidate	Votes	%	±%
Liberal	Arthur Delisle	1,906	52.0	-2.1
Conservative	Roch-Pamphile Vallée	1,756	48.0	+2.1
Total valid votes		3,662	100.0	

1887 Canadian federal election: Portneuf
Party	Candidate	Votes	%	±%
Liberal	(x)Esdras Alfred de St-Georges	1,962	54.2	+3.6
Conservative	Ed. Juchereau Duchesnay	1,661	45.8	-3.6
Total valid votes		3,623	100.0	

1882 Canadian federal election: Portneuf
Party	Candidate	Votes	%	±%
Liberal	Esdras Alfred de St-Georges	1,491	50.5	+1.1
Conservative	(x)Roch-Pamphile Vallée	1,459	49.5	-1.1
Total valid votes		2,950	100.0	

1878 Canadian federal election: Portneuf
Party	Candidate	Votes	%	±%
Conservative	Roch-Pamphile Vallée	1,605	50.5	+7.2
Liberal	(x)Esdras Alfred de St-Georges	1,572	49.5	-7.2
Total valid votes		3,177	100.0	

1874 Canadian federal election: Portneuf
Party	Candidate	Votes	%	±%
Liberal	(x)Esdras Alfred de St-Georges	1,421	56.7	+5.6
Conservative	J. Belleau	1,086	43.3	-5.6
Total valid votes		2,507	100.0	
Source: lop.parl.ca

1872 Canadian federal election: Portneuf
Party	Candidate	Votes	%	±%
Liberal	Esdras Alfred de St-Georges	1,179	51.1	
Conservative	Jean-Docile Brousseau	1,128	48.9	-9.9
Total valid votes		2,307	100.0	
Source: Canadian Elections Database

1867 Canadian federal election: Portneuf
Party	Candidate	Votes	%
Conservative	Jean-Docile Brousseau	1,027	58.8
Unknown	I. P. Dery	718	41.1
Unknown	Dubord	1	0.1
Total valid votes		1,746	100.0
Eligible voters		2,431	
Source: Canadian Parliamentary Guide, 1871

== See also ==
- List of Canadian electoral districts
- Historical federal electoral districts of Canada
