= Sainte-Marie (federal electoral district) =

Former federal electoral district in Quebec, Canada

Quebec electoral district

Defunct federal electoral district
- Legislature: House of Commons
- District created: 1892
- District abolished: 1976
- First contested: 1896
- Last contested: 1974

Sainte-Marie and St. Mary were federal electoral districts in Quebec, Canada, that were represented in the House of Commons of Canada from 1896 to 1979.

This riding was created in 1892 as "St. Mary" riding from parts of Montreal East riding. It consisted of St. Mary's ward in the city of Montreal. In 1914, it was expanded to include papineau ward. After 1924, it was defined as being a part of the city of Montreal circumscribed by a number of streets.

In 1952, St. Mary riding was abolished, and replaced by "Sainte-Marie" riding. In 1976, this riding was abolished when it was redistributed into Hochelaga, Laurier and Saint-Henri ridings.

From 1978 to 1980, Hochelaga riding was known as "Sainte-Marie", and from 1981 to 1987, it was known as "Montreal—Sainte-Marie".

== Members of Parliament ==
This riding elected the following members of Parliament:

Parliament	Years	Member	Party
St. Mary; Riding created from Montreal East
8th	1896–1900	Hercule Dupré	Liberal
9th	1900–1904	Joseph Israël Tarte	Liberal
10th	1904–1906	Camille Piché	Liberal
10th	1906–1908	Médéric Martin	Liberal
11th	1908–1911	Médéric Martin	Liberal
12th	1911–1917	Médéric Martin	Liberal
13th	1917–1921	Hermas Deslauriers	Opposition (Laurier Liberals)
14th	1921–1925	Hermas Deslauriers	Liberal
15th	1925–1926	Hermas Deslauriers	Liberal
16th	1926–1930	Hermas Deslauriers	Liberal
17th	1930–1935	Hermas Deslauriers	Liberal
18th	1935–1940	Hermas Deslauriers	Liberal
19th	1940–1941	Hermas Deslauriers	Liberal
19th	1942–1945	Gaspard Fauteux	Liberal
20th	1945–1949	Gaspard Fauteux	Liberal
21st	1949–1950	Gaspard Fauteux	Liberal
21st	1950–1953	Hector Dupuis	Liberal
Sainte-Marie
22nd	1953–1957	Hector Dupuis	Liberal
23rd	1957–1958	Hector Dupuis	Liberal
24th	1958–1962	Georges Valade	Progressive Conservative
25th	1962–1963	Georges Valade	Progressive Conservative
26th	1963–1965	Georges Valade	Progressive Conservative
27th	1965–1968	Georges Valade	Progressive Conservative
28th	1968–1972	Georges Valade	Progressive Conservative
29th	1972–1974	Raymond Dupont	Liberal
30th	1974–1979	Raymond Dupont	Liberal
Riding dissolved into Hochelaga, Laurier and Saint-Henri

== Election results ==
=== St. Mary, 1896–1953 ===
1896 Canadian federal election
Party	Candidate	Votes
Liberal	Hercule Dupré	3,367
Conservative	A.T. Lépine	1,967

1900 Canadian federal election
Party	Candidate	Votes
Liberal	Joseph Israël Tarte	3,178
Conservative	Trefflé Charpentier	1,922
Independent	Fridolin Roberge	182

1904 Canadian federal election
Party	Candidate	Votes
Liberal	Camille Piché	3,131
Conservative	L.T. Maréchal	2,169

By-election on 21 November 1906 Piché was appointed Police Magistrate, Montreal, 21 July 1906
Party	Candidate	Votes
Liberal	Médéric Martin	2,635
Unknown	Joseph Ainey	1,431

1908 Canadian federal election
Party	Candidate	Votes
Liberal	Médéric Martin	3,523
Conservative	L. Théophile Maréchal	2,654

1911 Canadian federal election
Party	Candidate	Votes
Liberal	Médéric Martin	5,089
Conservative	Joseph-Avila Massé	2,912
Labour	Charles-Norbert Allard	100

1917 Canadian federal election
Party	Candidate	Votes
Opposition (Laurier Liberals)	Hermas Deslauriers	acclaimed

1921 Canadian federal election
Party	Candidate	Votes
Liberal	Hermas Deslauriers	15,262
Independent	Augustin Germain	4,505
Conservative	Herman Julien	799

1925 Canadian federal election
Party	Candidate	Votes
Liberal	Hermas Deslauriers	14,411
Independent Liberal	Yvon Laurier	3,707

1926 Canadian federal election
Party	Candidate	Votes
Liberal	Hermas Deslauriers	14,793
Conservative	Eugène Chartier	2,836

1930 Canadian federal election
Party	Candidate	Votes
Liberal	Hermas Deslauriers	16,540
Conservative	Théodore Lefort	6,099

1935 Canadian federal election
Party	Candidate	Votes
Liberal	Hermas Deslauriers	18,479
Reconstruction	Hector Dupuis	12,840
Independent Liberal	ZotiquePaquin	907

1940 Canadian federal election
Party	Candidate	Votes
Liberal	Hermas Deslauriers	23,185
National Government	Gabriel Fauteux	4,785
Communist	Évariste Dubé	728
Co-operative Commonwealth	Théodore Prézeau	719

By-election on 9 February 1942 On Deslauriers' death, 28 May 1941
Party	Candidate	Votes
Liberal	Gaspard Fauteux	7,607
Canadian Party	Joseph Raoul Périllard	4,802
Unknown	J. Marcel Ostiguy	3,635
Unknown	Émile Naud	738

1945 Canadian federal election
Party	Candidate	Votes
Liberal	Gaspard Fauteux	18,237
Independent	Camillien Houde	14,275
Co-operative Commonwealth	Gaston St-Vincent	369
Social Credit	Raymond Foisy	348
Independent	Émile Naud	190
Independent	Raoul Périllard	117

1949 Canadian federal election
Party	Candidate	Votes
Liberal	Gaspard Fauteux	13,773
Progressive Conservative	Roland Lamarre	6,963
Co-operative Commonwealth	Jean Mcmaniman	352
Independent	Onil-Léonide Gingras	294
Independent	Philippe Richer	210
Labour	Robert Pelletier	108

By-election on 16 October 1950 On Fauteux's resignation, 18 August 1950
Party	Candidate	Votes
Liberal	Hector Dupuis	9,579
Liberal	Ignace Deslauriers	5,251
Independent	Pierre Archambault	383
Independent	Onil-Léonide Gingras	195
Independent Liberal	Émile Naud	80

=== Sainte-Marie, 1953–1979 ===
1953 Canadian federal election
Party	Candidate	Votes
Liberal	Hector Dupuis	16,288
Progressive Conservative	Jean-Paul Boisjoly	5,033
Co-operative Commonwealth	Samuel Daoust	553
Labor–Progressive	Roger Messier	241

1957 Canadian federal election
Party	Candidate	Votes
Liberal	Hector Dupuis	12,532
Progressive Conservative	Georges Valade	7,041
Co-operative Commonwealth	Eugène Dorais	752

1958 Canadian federal election
Party	Candidate	Votes
Progressive Conservative	Georges Valade	11,635
Liberal	Hector Dupuis	9,662
Co-operative Commonwealth	Eugène Dorais	634
Independent	Eddy Brown	433

1962 Canadian federal election
Party	Candidate	Votes
Progressive Conservative	Georges Valade	8,748
Liberal	Raymond Poupart	5,453
Candidat libéral des électeurs	J.-Édouard Pharon	1,836
Social Credit	Hervé Lajeunesse	1,364
New Democratic	Jean Coulombe	1,269
Independent PC	Georges Goyer	333

1963 Canadian federal election
Party	Candidate	Votes
Progressive Conservative	Georges Valade	8,549
Liberal	Albert Caplette	6,043
Social Credit	Hervé Lajeunesse	4,271
New Democratic	Jean Coulombe	1,320

1965 Canadian federal election
Party	Candidate	Votes
Progressive Conservative	Georges Valade	9,672
Liberal	Albert Caplette	5,201
New Democratic	Maurice Machet	1,385
Ralliement créditiste	Pierre Ménard	1,222

1968 Canadian federal election
Party	Candidate	Votes
Progressive Conservative	Georges Valade	9,528
Liberal	Jean-Robert Ouellet	7,449
Independent Liberal	Albert Caplette	1,977
New Democratic	Marcel Paquin	1,149
Ralliement créditiste	Pierre Ménard	884
Independent	Paul Rollin	169

1972 Canadian federal election
Party	Candidate	Votes
Liberal	Raymond Dupont	7,945
Progressive Conservative	Georges Valade	7,826
Social Credit	André Bergeron	3,662
New Democratic	Roméo Richer	1,482
Independent	Louisette Dussault	713
Independent	Réginald (Reggie) Chartrand	696
Independent	Jean-Paul Boisjoli	161

1974 Canadian federal election
Party	Candidate	Votes
Liberal	Raymond Dupont	8,300
Progressive Conservative	Georges Valade	7,902
Social Credit	Gaston Pleau	1,229
New Democratic	Roméo Richer	1,154
Marxist–Leninist	Jacques Bernard	296

== See also ==
- List of Canadian electoral districts
- Historical federal electoral districts of Canada
