= Jean-Louis Frenette =

Canadian politician (1920–2008)

Member of Parliament for Portneuf
- In office June 1962 – September 1965

Personal details
- Born: 21 September 1920 Saint-Marc-des-Carrières, Quebec, Canada
- Died: 9 April 2008 (aged 87) Saint-Marc-des-Carrières, Quebec, Canada
- Party: Social Credit
- Profession: architectural draftsman

Jean-Louis Frenette (21 September 1920 – 9 April 2008) was a Social Credit party member of the House of Commons of Canada. He was an architectural draftsman by career.

He was first elected at the Portneuf riding in the 1962 general election then re-elected there in 1963. After completing his term in the 26th Parliament, he became an independent candidate at Portneuf in the 1965 election but was defeated by Roland Godin of the Ralliement créditiste.

== Electoral record ==
1965 Canadian federal election: Portneuf
Party	Candidate	Votes	%	±%
Ralliement créditiste	Roland Godin	6,539	33.6	-22.8
Liberal	Albert Neilson	5,390	27.7	-5.6
Independent	(x)Jean-Louis Frenette	3,725	19.2	
Progressive Conservative	Gilbert Ouellet	3,400	17.5	+15.2
Independent PC	Louis-Philippe Bertrand	213	1.1	
New Democratic	Fernand Lepage	184	0.9	
Total valid votes		19,451	100.0	

Note: Ralliement créditiste vote is compared to Social Credit vote in the 1963 election.

1963 Canadian federal election: Portneuf
Party	Candidate	Votes	%	±%
Social Credit	(x)Jean-Louis Frenette	11,473	56.5	+1.4
Liberal	Andrée-Robert Rivard	6,776	33.3	+8.9
Independent PC	Grégoire Martel	1,616	8.0	
Progressive Conservative	René-Paul-Joseph Plourde	459	2.3	-18.3
Total valid votes		20,324	100.0	

1962 Canadian federal election: Portneuf
Party	Candidate	Votes	%	±%
Social Credit	Jean-Louis Frenette	12,089	55.0	
Liberal	J.-Gérard Maltais	5,377	24.5	-22.4
Progressive Conservative	Louis Dussault	4,510	20.5	-32.6
Total valid votes		21,976	100.0	
