= Hermas Deslauriers =

Canadian politician

Member of Parliament for St. Mary
- In office December 1917 – May 1941

Personal details
- Born: 21 October 1879 Saint-Charles-sur-Richelieu, Quebec, Canada
- Died: 28 May 1941 (aged 61)
- Party: Liberal; Laurier Liberals
- Spouse(s): Lucie Renaud m. 27 June 1905
- Profession: physician

Hermas Deslauriers (21 October 1879 – 28 May 1941) was a Canadian politician and physician. Delauriers served in the House of Commons of Canada, initially as one of the Laurier Liberals then as a Liberal member.

He was born in Saint-Charles-sur-Richelieu, Quebec and became a physician as a career.

Deslauriers attended seminary in Sainte-Hyacinthe then studied at Université Laval.

He was first elected to Parliament at the St. Mary riding in the 1917 general election under the Laurier Liberals party banner. He was re-elected as a Liberal in 1921, and won successive terms in 1925, 1926, 1930, 1935 and 1940. Deslauriers died on 28 May 1941 before completing his term in the 19th Canadian Parliament.
