= Jules Desrochers =

Canadian politician

Member of Parliament for Portneuf
- In office July 1930 – August 1935

Personal details
- Born: 30 June 1874 Lotbinière, Quebec
- Died: 4 January 1939 (aged 64)
- Party: Liberal
- Spouse(s): 1) Antonia Rinfret m. October 1899; 2) Valencia Matte m. March 1921
- Profession: pharmacist, physician

Jules Desrochers (30 June 1874 – 4 January 1939) was a Liberal party member of the House of Commons of Canada. He was born in Lotbinière, Quebec and became a pharmacist and physician.

Desrochers attended school at the Quebec Seminary, then earned his MD degree at Université Laval in 1899. From 1914 to 1921, he served as mayor of Saint-Raymond, Quebec and also served as president of the local school commission from 1908 to 1928.

He was first elected to Parliament at the Portneuf riding in the 1930 general election. He served only one term, the 17th Canadian Parliament, then left federal politics as he did not seek re-election in the 1935 vote.

== Electoral record ==
1930 Canadian federal election: Portneuf
Party	Candidate	Votes	%	±%
Liberal	Jules Desrochers	7,813	51.8	-2.6
Conservative	J.-Alfred Foley	7,262	48.2	
Total valid votes		15,075	100.0	
