= Hercule Dupré =

Canadian politician

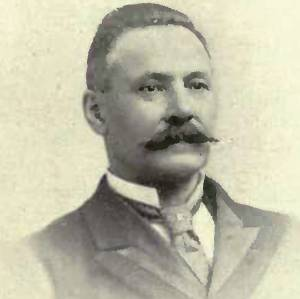
Hercule Dupré

Hercule Dupré (August 11, 1844 – May 3, 1927) was a farmer, lumber merchant and political figure in Quebec. He represented St. Mary in the House of Commons of Canada from 1896 to 1900 as a Liberal.

The son of Pierre Dupré, of Acadian descent, he was born in Verchères, Canada East and was educated there. In 1862, he married Vitaline Giard. Dupré worked on the family farm until the age of 28, when he entered the trade in lumber at Montreal with Édouard Chaussé; he later formed a new company with his brother. He was president of the local Saint-Jean-Baptiste Society in 1885. Dupré served as a member of the city council for Montreal from 1894 to 1900.
