= Saint-Jacques River (Portneuf River tributary) =

- Location within Quebec
- Native name: Rivière Saint-Jacques (French)

Location
- Country: Canada
- Province: Quebec
- Region: Capitale-Nationale, Mauricie
- Regional County Municipality: Portneuf Regional County Municipality
- Municipalities: Pont-Rouge, Saint-Basile

Physical characteristics
- Source: Agricultural stream
  - location: Pont-Rouge, MRC Portneuf Regional County Municipality
  - coordinates: 46°45′36″N 71°44′11″W
  - elevation: 94 m (308 ft)
- Mouth: Portneuf River
  - location: Saint-Basile
  - coordinates: 46°44′54″N 71°48′24″W
  - elevation: 60 m (200 ft)
- Length: 7.8 km (4.8 mi)

Basin features
- Tributaries
  - right: Two unidentified streams.

The Saint-Jacques River is a tributary of the Portneuf River, flowing in the municipalities of Pont-Rouge and Saint-Basile, in the Portneuf Regional County Municipality, in the administrative region of Capitale-Nationale, in the province of Quebec, Canada.

The Saint-Jacques river flows mainly in agricultural areas, the main economic activity in this small valley. Its course crosses a few forest islands.

This small valley is served by the chemin du rang Saint-Jacques (lower part) and the chemin du rang Terrebonne (upper part).

The surface of the Saint-Jacques river (except the rapids areas) is generally frozen from the beginning of December to the end of March; however, safe circulation on the ice is generally from late December to early March. The water level of the river varies with the seasons and the precipitation; the spring flood occurs in March or April.

== Geography ==
The Saint-Jacques river originates in an agricultural area, on the west side of a small hamlet served by rue Germain and by chemin du rang Terrebonne, in Pont-Rouge.

This source is located at:

- 1.4 kilometres (0.87 mi) north-west of the railway;
- 3.5 kilometres (2.2 mi) west of Pont-Rouge town center;
- 6.4 kilometres (4.0 mi) north-east of the village center of Saint-Basile;
- 5.4 kilometres (3.4 mi) north-east of the mouth of the Saint-Jacques River;
- 9.9 kilometres (6.2 mi) north of the confluence of the Jacques-Cartier River and St. Lawrence River.

From its source, the waters of the Saint-Jacques river flow over 7.8 kilometres (4.8 mi), with a drop of 34 metres (112 ft), according to the following segments:

- 4.9 kilometres (3.0 mi) to the southwest in an agricultural zone, collecting a first stream (coming from the north) which drains a marsh area and a second an unidentified stream (coming from the north), up to on chemin du rang Saint-Jacques;
- 2.9 kilometres (1.8 mi) first towards the west, then towards the south, along the chemin du rang Saint-Jacques on the west side of the road, to its mouth.

The Saint-Jacques river flows in a river loop (stretching east) on the east bank of the Portneuf River. This confluence is located 0.7 kilometres (0.43 mi) upstream of the confluence of the Rivière des Sept Îles. From the mouth of the Saint-Jacques River, the current descends on 14.8 kilometres (9.2 mi) the Portneuf river, winding south-west through the St. Lawrence plain, to the north shore of St. Lawrence River.

== Toponymy ==
The toponym "Rivière Saint-Jacques" was formalized on December 5, 1968, at the Place Names Bank of the Commission de toponymie du Québec.

== See also ==
- List of rivers of Quebec
