= Blanche River (Portneuf River tributary) =

- Location within Quebec

Location
- Country: Canada
- Province: Quebec
- Region: Capitale-Nationale, Mauricie
- Regional County Municipality: Portneuf Regional County Municipality
- Municipalities: Sainte-Catherine-de-la-Jacques-Cartier, Pont-Rouge, Saint-Basile

Physical characteristics
- Source: Blanc Lake
  - location: Saint-Raymond, MRC Portneuf Regional County Municipality
  - coordinates: 46°50′23″N 71°41′34″W
  - elevation: 334 m (1,096 ft)
- Mouth: Portneuf River
  - location: Saint-Basile
  - coordinates: 46°48′17″N 71°44′51″W
  - elevation: 110 m (360 ft)
- Length: 7.9 km (4.9 mi)

Basin features
- Tributaries
  - left: Discharge of Lac Linteau.

The Rivière Blanche (French pronunciation: [ʁivjɛʁ blɑ̃ʃ], lit. 'White River') is a tributary of the Portneuf River, flowing in the municipalities of Sainte-Catherine-de-la-Jacques-Cartier, Pont-Rouge and Saint-Basile, in the regional county municipality (MRC) of Portneuf Regional County Municipality, in the administrative region of Capitale-Nationale, in the province of Quebec, in Canada.

Apart from the passage of the river in a small hamlet of Pont-Rouge (near Lake André), the Blanche river flows especially at the border between the agricultural and forest environment, the main economic activities of this small valley.

This valley is served by chemin du Rang Sainte-Madeleine, chemin du 2e rang du Brûlé, rue Lamothe, chemin Tâché and chemin des Ormeaux.

The surface of the Blanche River (except the rapids areas) is generally frozen from the beginning of December to the end of March; however, safe circulation on the ice is generally from late December to early March. The water level of the river varies with the seasons and the precipitation; the spring flood occurs in March or April.

== Geography ==
The Blanche River rises at Lac Blanc located in the northwestern part of the municipality of Sainte-Catherine-de-la-Jacques-Cartier. Its mouth is located 0.75 kilometres (0.47 mi) southwest of a mountain peak culminating at 355 metres (1,165 ft), at 2.24 kilometres (1.39 mi) southeast of Sergent Lake, 6.6 kilometres (4.1 mi) south-west of the village center of Sainte-Catherine-de-la-Jacques-Cartier and 13.2 kilometres (8.2 mi) north-east of the village center of Saint-Basile.

From the mouth of Lac Blanc, the course of the Blanche River descends on 7.9 kilometres (4.9 mi), with a drop of 224 metres (735 ft), according to the following segments:

- 2.1 kilometres (1.3 mi) to the south-east in the forest zone and down the mountain, then south, to the outlet (coming from the north-east) of Lac Linteau, corresponding to the hamlet of Lac André;
- 5.8 kilometres (3.6 mi) towards the southwest by following the foot of the mountain, then crosses a small plain, to its mouth. Note: Part of this last segment marks the boundary between Pont-Rouge and Saint-Basile.

The Blanche river flows on the northeast bank of the Portneuf River. This confluence is located 6.8 kilometres (4.2 mi) north-west of the center of the village of Pont-Rouge, 16.3 kilometres (10.1 mi) north of the confluence of the Portneuf and Saint Lawrence River.

From the mouth of the Blanche River, the current descends on 21.9 kilometres (13.6 mi) the Portneuf River, winding south-west through the St. Lawrence plain, to the north shore of the St. Lawrence River.

== Toponymy ==
The toponym "Rivière Blanche" was formalized on December 5, 1968, at the Place Names Bank of the Commission de toponymie du Québec.

== See also ==
- Portneuf Regional County Municipality
- Sainte-Catherine-de-la-Jacques-Cartier, a municipality
- Saint-Basile, a municipality
- Pont-Rouge, a municipality
- Portneuf River, a watercourse
- List of rivers of Quebec
