= Chaude River (Portneuf River tributary) =

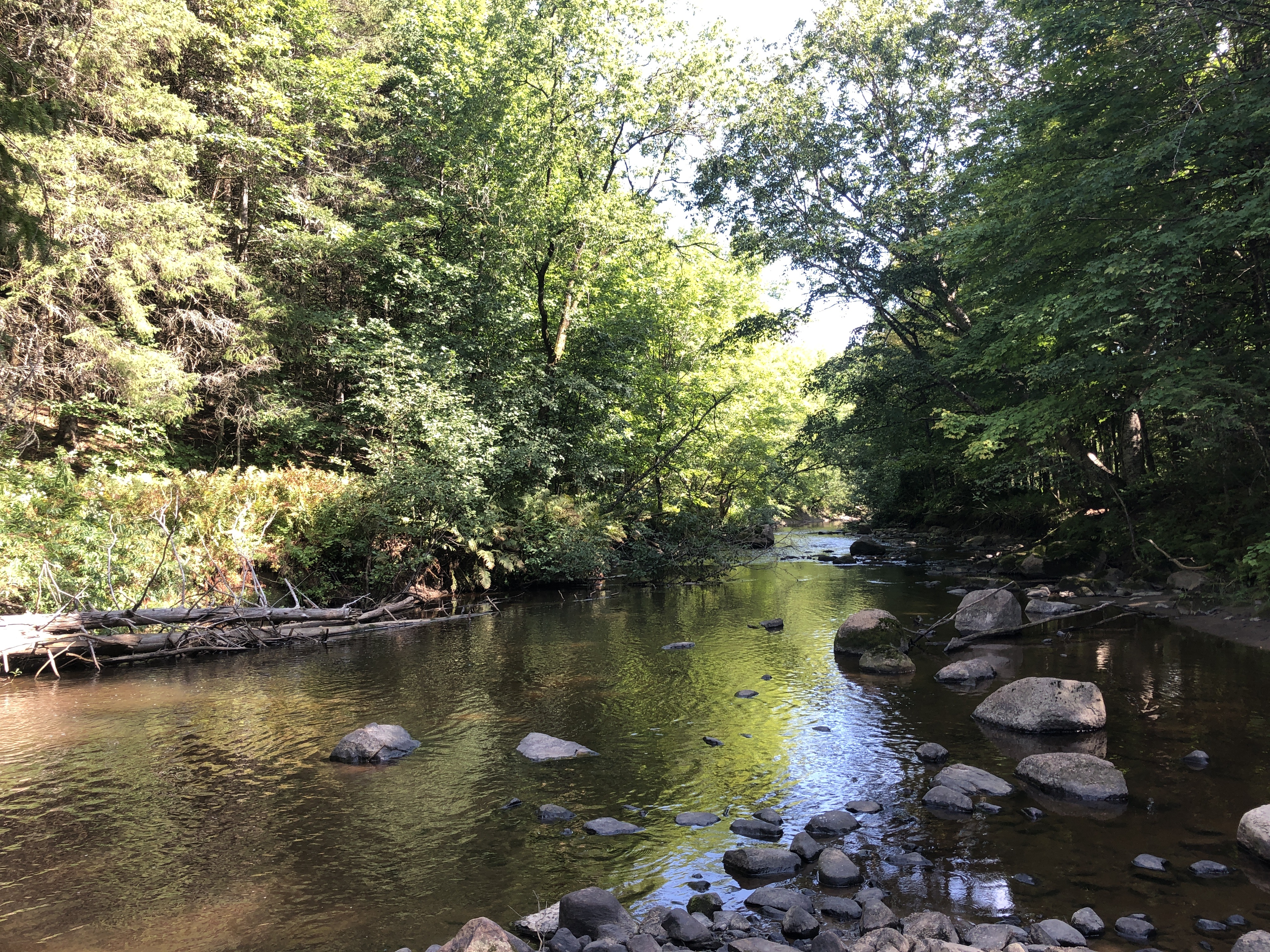

- Location within Quebec
- Native name: Rivière Chaude (French)

Location
- Country: Canada
- Province: Quebec
- Region: Capitale-Nationale, Mauricie
- Regional County Municipality: Portneuf Regional County Municipality
- Municipalities: Portneuf, Sainte-Christine-d'Auvergne, Saint-Basile

Physical characteristics
- Source: Confluence of two forest streams
  - location: Portneuf, MRC Portneuf Regional County Municipality
  - coordinates: 46°47′10″N 71°56′44″W
  - elevation: 130 m (430 ft)
- Mouth: Portneuf River
  - location: Saint-Basile
  - coordinates: 46°44′44″N 71°49′44″W
  - elevation: 50 m (160 ft)
- Length: 22.1 km (13.7 mi)

Basin features
- Tributaries
  - left: (Upward from the mouth) Unidentified stream, unidentified stream, unidentified stream, unidentified stream, Rosa stream, unidentified stream, unidentified stream, unidentified stream.
  - right: (Upward from the mouth) Unidentified stream, Gauthier branch, Délisle stream.

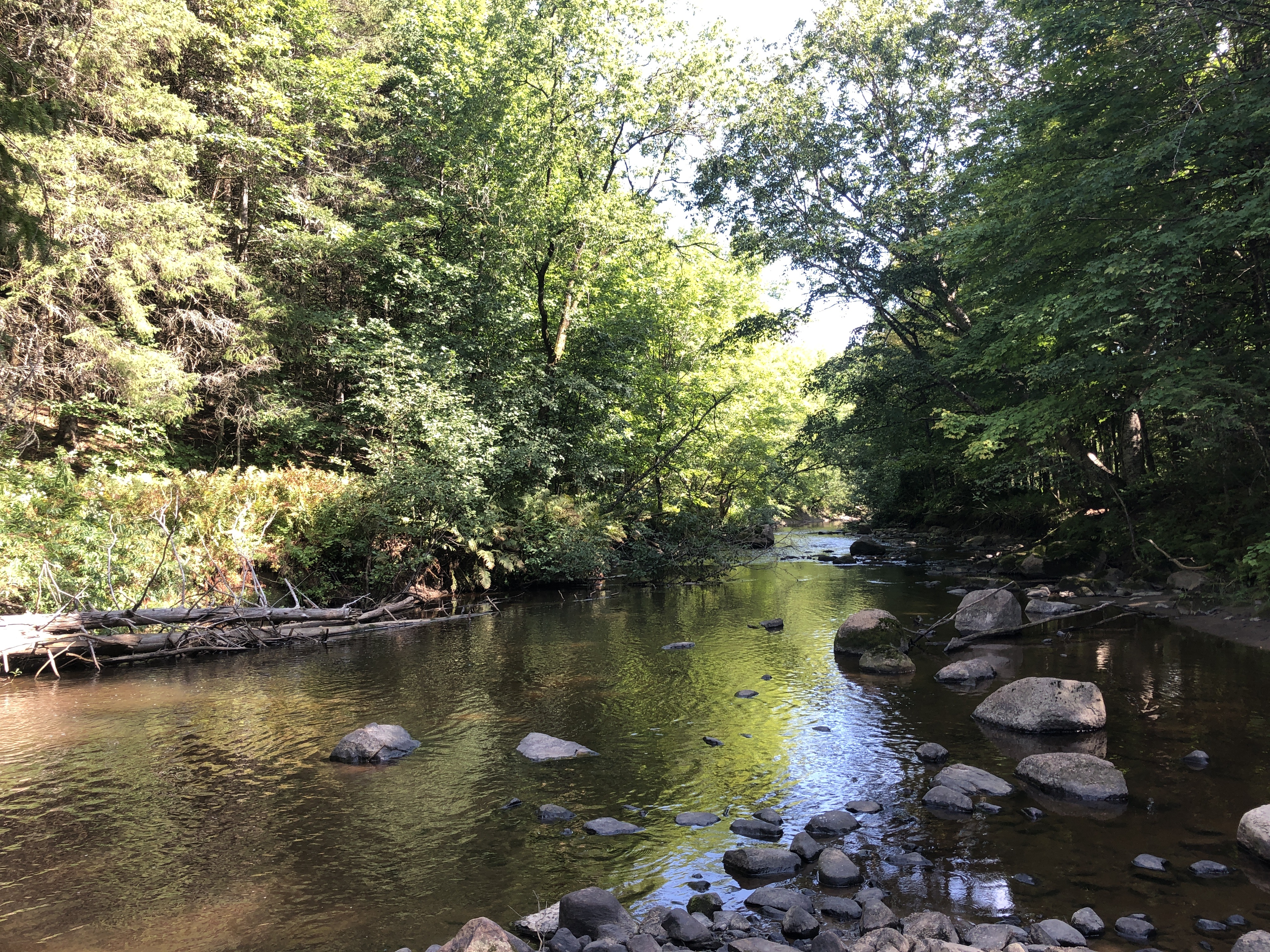
Chaude River

The Chaude River is a tributary of the Portneuf River, flowing in the municipalities of Portneuf, Sainte-Christine-d'Auvergne and Saint-Basile, in the Portneuf, in the administrative region of Capitale-Nationale, in the province of Quebec, in Canada.

Apart from the passage of the river near the village of Saint-Basile, the Chaude river flows mainly in agricultural and forestry areas, being the main economic activities of this small valley.

This small valley is served by chemin du rang Saint-Georges, rue Saint-Georges, boulevard du Centenaire, chemin du rang Sainte-Anne, route Côme-Lavallée, chemin du rang des Alain, route Saint-Joseph, the Misaël-Matte road and the 1st rue du Domaine-Allouette. The upper part is served by Chemin du Grand Rang, Chemin du Rang de la Montagne and Chemin de Bourg-Louis.

The surface of the Chaude River (except the rapids areas) is generally frozen from the beginning of December to the end of March; however, safe circulation on the ice is generally from late December to early March. The water level of the river varies with the seasons and the precipitation; the spring flood occurs in March or April.

== Geography ==
The Chaude river has its source in a forest area in the northern part of the municipality of Portneuf; this source of the Saint-Laurent plain is located southeast of Domaine-Allouette which is located southeast of rang-des-Bois-Francs road in Sainte-Christine-d'Auvergne.

This source is located at:

- 4.1 kilometres (2.5 mi) east of a curve of the Sainte-Anne River (Mauricie);
- 3.6 kilometres (2.2 mi) south-east of the village center of Sainte-Christine-d'Auvergne;
- 9.8 kilometres (6.1 mi) west of the village center of Saint-Basile;
- 10.0 kilometres (6.2 mi) west of the mouth of the Chaude river.

Course of the Chaude River

From its source, the waters of the Chaude River flow over 22.1 kilometres (13.7 mi), with a drop of 80 metres (260 ft), according to the following segments:

- 3.5 kilometres (2.2 mi) to the north, forming a large detour to the west, to a stream (coming from the northwest);
- 2.1 kilometres (1.3 mi) north-east, up to a bend in the river;
- 2.2 kilometres (1.4 mi) towards the south-east, up to the Aulnages stream (coming from the south);
- 2.0 kilometres (1.2 mi) towards the north-east, by forming a curve towards the south-east, up to the chemin du rang Saint-Joseph;
- 8.5 kilometres (5.3 mi) towards the east in agricultural area, first a segment of 2.8 kilometres (1.7 mi) by collecting the Rosa stream (coming from the northwest) and crossing the road Saint Joseph; then a segment of 5.7 kilometres (3.5 mi) by forming intermittent streamers and crossing the Alain route twice, until the Côme-Lavallée road;
- 3.8 kilometres (2.4 mi) towards the south-east by winding on the west side of the village of Saint-Basile and by crossing the path of rang Saint-Georges, to its mouth.

The Chaude river flows on the northwest bank of the Portneuf River. From the mouth of the Chaude river, the current descends on 12.0 kilometres (7.5 mi) the Portneuf river, winding south-west through the plain of the St. Lawrence, to the north shore of the St. Lawrence River.

== Toponymy ==
The term "hot" in the Canadian toponymy for watercourses generally refers to sources of water that inhibit the formation of ice in winter on the surface of the watercourse.

The toponym "Rivière Chaude" was formalized on December 5, 1968, in the Place Names Bank of the Commission de toponymie du Québec.

== See also ==
- Portneuf Regional County Municipality, an MRC
- Portneuf, a municipality
- Sainte-Christine-d'Auvergne, a municipality
- Saint-Basile, a municipality
- Portneuf River, a watercourse
- List of rivers of Quebec
