= Rivière d'Aulnage =

- Location within Quebec

Location
- Country: Canada
- Province: Quebec
- Regions: Capitale-Nationale; Mauricie
- Regional County Municipality: Portneuf Regional County Municipality
- Municipalities: Saint-Basile; Saint-Raymond

Physical characteristics
- Source: Confluence of three forest streams near Hydro-Québec's high-voltage power lines.
  - location: Saint-Léonard-de-Portneuf, MRC Portneuf Regional County Municipality
  - coordinates: 46°49′07″N 71°50′22″W
  - elevation: 172 m (564 ft)
- Mouth: Rivière des Sept Îles
  - location: Saint-Basile
  - coordinates: 46°45′45″N 71°49′01″W
  - elevation: 60 m (200 ft)

Basin features
- Tributaries
  - left: (Upward from the mouth) Unidentified stream, unidentified stream, unidentified stream.
  - right: Unidentified stream.

The Rivière d'Aulnage (English: Aulnage River) is a tributary of the rivière des Sept Îles, flowing on the north shore of the St. Lawrence River in the municipalities of Saint-Léonard-de-Portneuf and Saint-Basile, in the Portneuf Regional County Municipality, in the administrative region of Capitale-Nationale, in the province of Quebec, in Canada.

The upper part of the Aulnage river flows mainly in the forest, descending the Montagne de Sainte-Angélique; the lower part is mainly in agricultural area. For example, forestry and agriculture are the main economic activities in this valley.

This valley is served mainly by the chemini of rang Sainte-Anne (west side) and by the rue Sainte-Angélique (east side) which becomes towards the north the chemin du rang Sainte-Angélique.

The surface of the Aulnage river (except the rapids areas) is generally frozen from the beginning of December to the end of March; however, safe circulation on the ice is generally from late December to early March. The water level of the river varies with the seasons and the precipitation; the spring flood occurs in March or April.

== Geography ==
The Aulnage river takes its source at the confluence of three forest streams on the Sainte-Angélique Mountain (summit at 235 metres (771 ft)), in Saint-Léonard-de-Portneuf, near the northern limit of Saint-Basile. This source is located under Hydro-Québec's high-voltage lines at 6.4 kilometres (4.0 mi) northwest of the mouth of the Aulnage river, at 7.0 kilometres (4.3 mi) north-west of the village center of Saint-Basile, 7.9 kilometres (4.9 mi) north-west of the mouth of the Rivière des Sept Îles and 14.3 kilometres (8.9 mi) north of the mouth of the Portneuf River.

Course of the rivière d'Aulnage

From its source on the Sainte-Angélique Mountain, the waters of the rivière d'Aulnage flow over:

- 6.3 kilometres (3.9 mi) to the south down the mountain, then south-east into the agricultural plain, passing by Saint-Basile Airport (Marcotte), up to the street bridge Sainte-Angélique;
- 1.6 kilometres (0.99 mi) towards the south-east by collecting several small agricultural streams, up to its mouth (altitude: 60 kilometres (37 mi)) which flows into the rivière des Sept Îles, at the north of the village of Saint-Basile.

The Aulnage river flows on the northwest bank of the rivière des Sept Îles. From the mouth of the rivière d'Aulnage, the current descends on 2.3 kilometres (1.4 mi) to the south taking the course of the Sept Îles river, then on 13.9 kilometres (8.6 mi) towards the southwest taking the course of Portneuf River by winding through the plain of the St. Lawrence, to the north shore of the St. Lawrence River.

== Toponymy ==
In Europe, an alder grove means a forest-type vegetation where predominantly the alder (Alnus glutinosa), a tree of the family Betulaceae.

In eastern Canada, an alder grove can be both a forest and a wetland. Two types of alder are present on the territory, the crested alder (Alnus viridis var. Crispa) and the rough alder (Alnus incana). These two species are not found in the same habitat. The first is in a dry environment, thus designating a vegetation of forest type and the second in a wet environment, therefore designating a vegetation typical of a wet environment.

Aldering means the action of cleaning an alder grove.

The toponym "Rivière d'Aulnage" was formalized on August 17, 1978, at the Place Names Bank of the Commission de toponymie du Québec.

== See also ==
- List of rivers of Quebec
