= Gosford River =

River in Portneuf, Canada

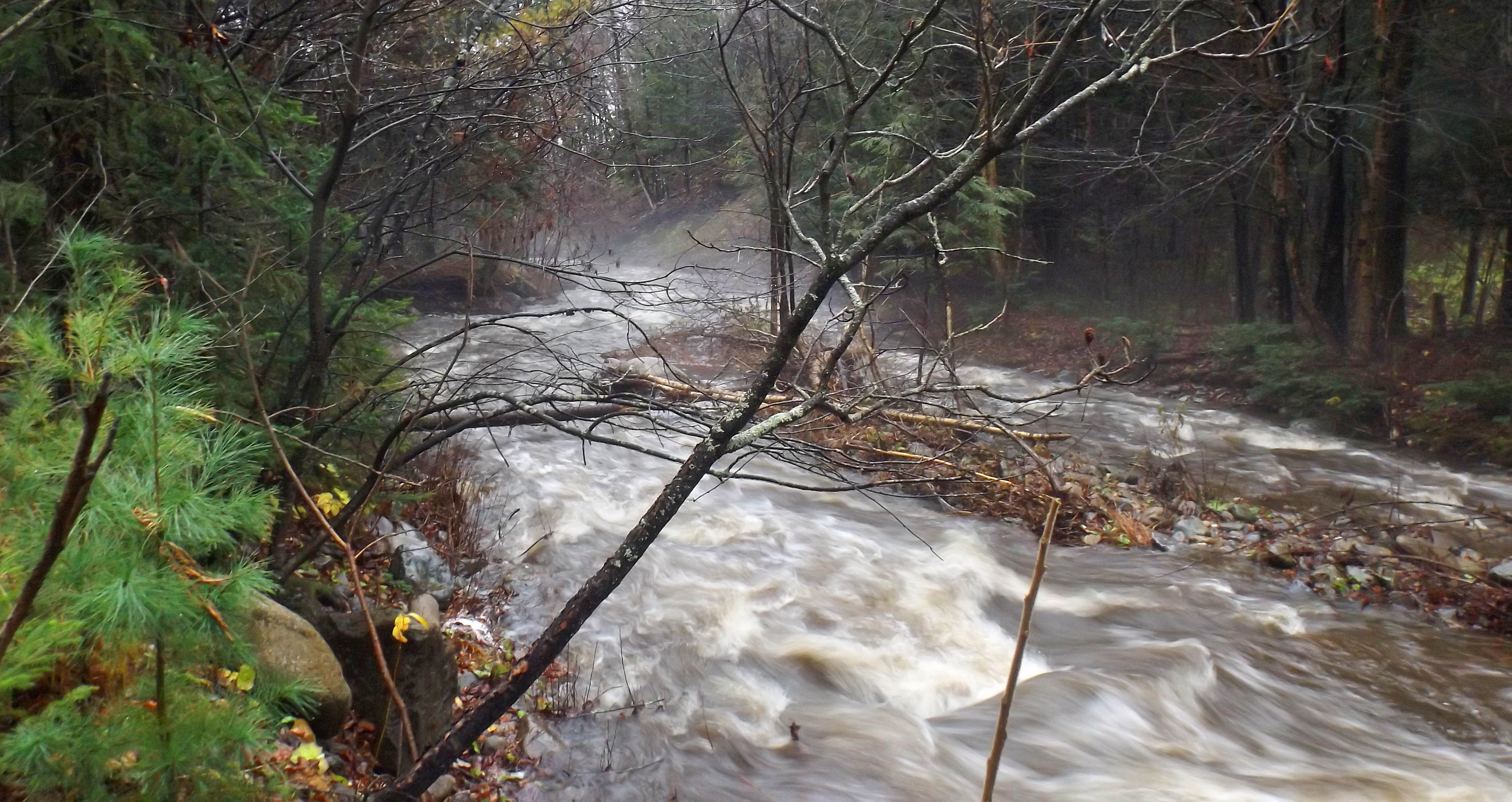

- Location within Quebec

Location
- Country: Canada
- Province: Quebec
- Region: Capitale-Nationale, Mauricie
- Regional County Municipality: Portneuf Regional County Municipality
- Municipalities: Saint-Raymond

Physical characteristics
- Source: Gosford Lake
  - location: Saint-Raymond, MRC Portneuf Regional County Municipality
  - coordinates: 46°56′30″N 71°45′55″W
  - elevation: 291 m (955 ft)
- Mouth: Lac Sept Îles
  - location: Saint-Raymond
  - coordinates: 46°44′44″N 71°49′44″W
  - elevation: 209 m (686 ft)
- Length: 6.3 km (3.9 mi)

The Gosford River is a tributary of the Sept Îles Lake which is the head of the Portneuf River, flowing in the municipality of Portneuf, in the Portneuf Regional County Municipality, in the administrative region of Capitale-Nationale, in the province of Quebec, in Canada.

The Gosford River flows entirely in the forest zone. Forestry is the main economic activity in this small valley.

This small valley is served by the chemin du rang Notre-Dame which bypasses the Lac des Aulnaies by the north and by the chemin du rang Gosford which goes up the valley.

The surface of the Gosford River (except the rapids areas) is generally frozen from the beginning of December to the end of March; however, safe circulation on the ice is generally from late December to early March. The water level of the river varies with the seasons and the precipitation; the spring flood occurs in March or April.

== Geography ==
The Gosford River originates in a forest area on the northwest side of rang Gosford Road, in the municipality of Saint-Raymond. This source is located at:

- 1.7 kilometres (1.1 mi) east of a curve of the Sainte-Anne River;
- 1.4 kilometres (0.87 mi) north-west of a mountain peak reaching 432 metres (1,417 ft) where a communication tower has been built there;
- 10.9 kilometres (6.8 mi) north of the village center of Saint-Raymond;
- 3.8 kilometres (2.4 mi) north of the mouth of the Gosford river.

From its source, the waters of the Gosford River flow for 6.3 kilometres (3.9 mi) south in a relatively straight line, with a drop of 82 metres (269 ft).

The Gosford River flows to the bottom of a bay on the west shore of Sept Sept Lake. From the mouth of the Gosford River, the current crosses 2.8 kilometres (1.7 mi) southeast to Sept Sept lake to its mouth; then the current descends on 42 kilometres (26 mi) by the Portneuf river, winding towards the southwest in the Saint-Laurent plain, to the north shore of the Saint-Laurent river.

== Toponymy ==
This toponymic designation appears on a map of the Association of Owners of Lac Sept Îles, 1977–06. The name refers to the name of the canton. This toponym evokes the memory of Archibald Acheson, 2nd Earl of Gosford (1776-1849). Of Scottish descent, born in Ireland, Lord Gosford was governor-in-chief of British North America from 1835 to 1838, one of the most turbulent periods in our history. Coming as Royal Commissioner, assisted by George Gipps and Charles Edward Gray, he was responsible for investigating the political problems that paralyzed Lower Canada. His report not having pleased the French Canadians, Gosford, moreover well disposed, asked for his recall and was replaced by John Colborne. In 1840, he defended them by declaring himself, in the parliament of Westminster, against the Union project which would have allocated the same number of seats to Upper and Lower Canada in the new assembly.

The toponym "Rivière Gosford" was formalized on August 17, 1978, at the Place Names Bank of the Commission de toponymie du Québec.

== See also ==
=== Related articles ===
- Portneuf Regional County Municipality, an MRC
- Saint-Raymond, a municipality
- Sept Îles Lake
- Portneuf River, a watercourse
- List of rivers of Quebec
