= Chaude River =

Chaude River may refer to:

- Chaude River (Portneuf River), in Saint-Basile, Quebec, Canada
- Chaude River (La Grande Rivière), in Saint-Onésime-d'Ixworth, Quebec, Canada
