= Michel Pagé =

Canadian businessman and politician (1949-2013)

Michel Pagé (December 4, 1949 – September 4, 2013) was a Canadian businessman and politician in the province of Quebec. He served in the National Assembly of Quebec from 1973 to 1992 as a Liberal and was a cabinet minister in the government of Robert Bourassa.

He is not to be confused with another Michel Pagé who has written about the linguistic integration of immigrants in Quebec.

== Early life and career ==
Pagé was born in Saint-Basile, Quebec. He received a Bachelor of Laws degree from Université Laval in 1973, was called to the Quebec Bar in 1974, and practiced law from 1974 to 1985.

== Legislator ==
Pagé was first elected to the National Assembly of Quebec in the 1973 provincial election, defeating one-term Créditiste incumbent Antoine Drolet in the division of Portneuf, near Quebec City. He was only twenty-three years old at the time. The Liberals won a landslide majority government in this election, and Pagé served as a backbench supporter of Robert Bourassa's administration.

The Liberals lost to the Parti Québécois in the 1976 provincial election, although Pagé kept his seat by a reduced margin. After the election, he served as his party's critic for tourism. He supported Raymond Garneau's unsuccessful bid for the party leadership in 1978.

Pagé fought for the "non" side in Quebec's 1980 referendum on sovereignty and was at the time considered a strong supporter of Canadian federalism. After the "non" side's victory, he introduced an unsuccessful motion to have the Canadian flag permanently displayed in the national assembly.

He was re-elected again in 1981 and served as chief opposition whip and caucus chair for the next four years. He was neutral in the Liberal Party's 1983 leadership contest, citing the responsibilities of his office.

In 1981, Pagé alleged that pornographic videotapes had been made in the legislature using provincial television equipment. An investigation found there was no substance to the charge and that no such tapes were made.

== Cabinet minister ==
Agriculture Minister

The Liberal Party returned to power under Robert Bourassa's leadership in the 1985 provincial election. When Bourassa formed his first cabinet in December 1985, he named Pagé as his minister of Agriculture, Fisheries and Food. After the 1989 provincial election, Pagé received additional responsibilities as government house leader.

Pagé supported the Canada-United States Free Trade Agreement in October 1987, saying that it would not affect Quebec's agricultural programs. The deal later met with opposition from some in the agricultural sector, and Pagé called on the federal government to ensure that guarantees over import restrictions were included in the final settlement.

Pagé announced changes to Quebec's milk distribution program in 1986, introducing a new program for low-income pregnant mothers and reducing the distribution of free milk to elementary school children from five days per week to three. The Parti Québécois alleged that the latter change would hurt low-income Quebecers, though Pagé disagreed with this conclusion. Following criticism, Pagé agreed to restore free milk on a daily basis. In 1989, he announced that Quebec would become the first jurisdiction to ban dioxins and furans from Quebec milk cartons.

In 1987, Pagé led cabinet in passing an order in council that required margarine produced in Quebec to be a different colour from butter. The intent of the legislation was to support dairy production and to make consumers aware of the difference between "a natural product and a synthetic one." Margarine producers strongly opposed the change.

Pagé announced an aid package for Quebec's horse breeding sector in 1987. He later reached an agreement to save the financially troubled Blue Bonnets harness raceway in early 1988.

In 1989, Pagé recommended that cabinet transfer its authority over agricultural rezoning to a quasi-judicial commission. (This followed a controversy over a proposed land sale that would have resulted in financial gain for some prominent donors to the Quebec Liberal Party; Pagé postponed the sale following the revelations.) The Bourassa government imposed a rezoning moratorium and commissioned a task force to find ways of ending speculation on such property.

Pagé supported the Bourassa's government's shift toward Quebec nationalism after the failure of the Meech Lake Accord on reforms to the Canadian constitution in June 1990. Among other things, the accord would have recognized Quebec as a "distinct society" within Canada; after its collapse, Pagé said that Quebec's future would be determined only by Quebecers. He boycotted all but one event at a policy conference for Canada's agriculture ministers later in the year.

Pagé was the acting Public Security minister when the Oka crisis first broke out in 1990. He has said that he did not authorize the police assault on a Mohawk barricade that resulted in the death of a Quebec officer. The government later stated that an assistant to regular minister Sam Elkas knew of the raid, but did not inform either Elkas or Pagé.

Education Minister

In 1990, Pagé was transferred from the Agriculture portfolio to Education. He retained his position as government house leader.

Pagé ended Quebec's involvement with a national Canadian task force on education in November 1990, citing the failure of the Meech Lake Accord and noting that education was largely a provincial responsibility. His decision effectively stopped the task force's work. He later opposed a federal literacy and training strategy as an encroachment into the province's jurisdiction.

In May 1991, Pagé rejected a Parti Québécois suggestion to bus non-francophone immigrant students to schools in predominantly francophone neighbourhoods. He considered, but ultimately did not accept, changes to a clause in Quebec's Charter of the French Language that required all immigrant students to attend French-language schools. In September 1991, he announced a five-year program to reduce Quebec's high dropout rate, added more school days, and provide greater flexibility for the province's education providers.

Pagé announced in May 1991 that several schools in low-income neighbourhoods would serve free breakfasts to students at the start of each day. The following year, he again introduced cutbacks to Quebec's free milk program (after the program was transferred from the Agriculture ministry to Education).

Government House Leader

In May 1991, Pagé blocked an effort by the Equality Party to have the Canadian flag permanently displayed in the national assembly. He acknowledged that he had introduced an identical motion eleven years earlier, though he said his purpose (like that of the Equality Party) was simply to embarrass the government of the day. As a compromise, the Liberals agreed to bring out the Canadian flag on special occasions.

Pagé oversaw legislation for a provincial referendum in late 1992. The Bourassa government's original intent was to have a vote on Quebec sovereignty, but it later changed the referendum to a vote on the Charlottetown Accord, a post-Meech Lake effort at constitutional reform. The accord was defeated in Quebec and in a national vote across Canada. Following the vote, Pagé said that Canadians could no longer live happily together and that sovereignty-association could be an interesting concept for Quebec's future. (Several years later, Pagé said that he made these comments in the emotion of the moment and that they were not representative of his beliefs.)

He resigned from cabinet in October 1992 and formally resigned from the legislature a month later.

== After politics ==
Pagé was the president and chief executive officer of Donohue Inc., a pulp and newsprint company based in Quebec City, from October 1992 until his sudden resignation in August 1994. He announced in March 1993 that the company would post a profit after two years of losses, due in large part to rising lumber prices. He was named as the honorary chairman of Lithos Corp. in October 1995.

He made a guest appearance at a Bloc Québécois policy convention in 1995, although he said that his intent was to discuss non-partisan issues and that he had not become a Quebec sovereigntist. He later said that he voted against sovereignty in the province's 1995 referendum.

Pagé was appointed as interim president of the educational channel Radio-Québec on December 17, 1995, following the death of Jean Fortier. His first responsibility was to oversee a restructuring plan that had been approved by the previous leadership, involving several layoffs. In June 1996, he agreed to a program exchange with Radio-Canada.

In March 1998, he was nominated to the board of Searchgold Resources Inc. He led a group of investors in purchasing the Montreal-based airline firm Inter-Canadien later in the same year, and he later served as the company's vice-president. Inter-Canadien suspended operations in December 1999 and declared bankruptcy the following year.

Pagé tried to purchase the International Hockey League's Quebec Rafales in 1998, but was not successful.

Pagé was president of the Commission canadienne du lait in 2001–02. In this capacity, he announced a support price increase for skim milk powder and butter in late December 2001 that was criticized by both producers and consumers. He later promised producers a more significant price increase, but was forced to withdraw this pledge after meeting with opposition from the Canadian government.

== Electoral record ==
1989 Quebec general election: Portneuf
| Party | Candidate | Votes | % | ±% |
|---|---|---|---|---|
| Liberal | Michel Pagé | 17,768 | 70.70 | |
| Parti Québécois | Michelle Labrie | 7,362 | 29.30 | |
| Total valid votes | | 25,130 | 100.00 | |
| Rejected and declined votes | | 858 | | |
| Turnout | | 25,988 | 78.34 | |
| Electors on the lists | | 33,173 | | |
Source: Official Results, Le Directeur général des élections du Québec.

1985 Quebec general election: Portneuf
| Party | Candidate | Votes | % | ±% |
|---|---|---|---|---|
| Liberal | Michel Pagé | 18,406 | 69.10 | +17.96 |
| Parti Québécois | Robert Jasmin | 7,187 | 26.98 | −18.68 |
| New Democratic | Gilles Harvey | 726 | 2.73 | |
| Humanist | Jean Paradis | 264 | 0.99 | |
| Christian Socialist | Mario Paradis | 52 | 0.20 | |
| Total valid votes | | 26,635 | 100.00 | |
| Rejected and declined votes | | 279 | | |
| Turnout | | 26,914 | 81.34 | −5.62 |
| Electors on the lists | | 33,087 | | |
Source: Official Results, Le Directeur général des élections du Québec.

1981 Quebec general election: Portneuf
| Party | Candidate | Votes | % | ±% |
|---|---|---|---|---|
| Liberal | Michel Pagé | 14,120 | 51.14 | |
| Parti Québécois | André Girard | 12,607 | 45.66 | |
| Union Nationale | Yves Bernatchez | 884 | 3.20 | – |
| Total valid votes | | 27,611 | 100.00 | |
| Rejected and declined votes | | 242 | | |
| Turnout | | 27,853 | 86.96 | |
| Electors on the lists | | 32,028 | | |
Source: Official Results, Le Directeur général des élections du Québec.

1976 Quebec general election: Portneuf
| Party | Candidate | Votes | % | ±% |
|---|---|---|---|---|
| Liberal | Michel Pagé | 10,362 | 40.47 | −12.67 |
| Parti Québécois | Gilles Naud | 7,579 | 29.60 | +12.50 |
| Union Nationale | Antoine-B. Dussault | 3,815 | 14.90 | +10.72 |
| Ralliement créditiste | Roland Godin | 3,741 | 14.61 | −10.97 |
| Parti national populaire | Pierre Castonguay | 106 | 0.41 | |
| Total valid votes | | 25,603 | 100.00 | |
| Rejected and declined votes | | 407 | | |
| Turnout | | 26,010 | 89.04 | +3.61 |
| Electors on the lists | | 29,210 | | |
Source: Official Results, Le Directeur général des élections du Québec.

1973 Quebec general election: Portneuf
| Party | Candidate | Votes | % |
|---|---|---|---|
| Liberal | Michel Pagé | 12,638 | 53.14 |
| Ralliement créditiste | Antoine Drolet | 6,083 | 25.58 |
| Parti Québécois | Jean-Paul Julien | 4,067 | 17.10 |
| Union Nationale | Paul-Émile Langevin | 993 | 4.18 |
| Total valid votes | | 23,781 | |
| Rejected and declined votes | | 242 | |
| Turnout | | 24,023 | 85.43 |
| Electors on the lists | | 28,119 | |
Source: Official Results, Le Directeur général des élections du Québec.
