= Raymond Francœur =

Canadian politician (born 1946)

His Worship Raymond Francœur

Mayor of Sainte-Christine-d'Auvergne
- In office 2013–2025
- Preceded by: Pierre Tourigny
- In office 2001–2007
- Succeeded by: Michel Sansfaçon

MNA for Portneuf
- In office April 25, 2007 – November 5, 2008
- Preceded by: Jean-Pierre Soucy
- Succeeded by: Michel Matte

Personal details
- Born: June 14, 1946 (age 80) Beauport, Quebec, Canada
- Party: Action démocratique du Québec
- Spouse: Claudette Roberge
- Profession: teacher, director, marketing director

Raymond Francœur (born June 14, 1946) is a politician from Quebec, Canada. He was an Action démocratique du Québec Member of the National Assembly for the electoral district of Portneuf from 2007 to 2008.

Francœur was born in Beauport, Quebec (now Quebec City). After his collegiate studies at CEGEP de Sainte-Foy, he was enrolled in the Canadian Forces as an officer lieutenant. After his military service, he held various directing positions, including the director for the Quebec & Saguenay–Lac-Saint-Jean division of Scott Paper Company, and a Quebec City region director of a local milk company. He was also a marketing and/or sales director for various local institutions including automobile dealerships (while also being co-owner) and insurance companies. He also taught for six years at CEGEP Sainte-Foy in the marketing department. He was a member for various local Club organisations including the Lions Club, Club Rotary and Club Optimiste in the Quebec City area.

Before his election, he served as mayor of Sainte-Christine-d'Auvergne.

Francœur was first elected in the 2007 election with 46% of the vote. Liberal incumbent Jean-Pierre Soucy finished second with 32% of the vote. Francœur took office on April 12, 2007.

== Electoral record ==
2026 Quebec general election: Portneuf
** Preliminary results — Not yet official **
Party	Candidate	Votes	%	±%
Conservative	Marcel Bouchard	21,817	51.58	
Coalition Avenir Québec	Vincent Caron	7,545	17.84	
Parti Québécois	Raymond Francœur	6,559	15.51	
Liberal	Jeremy Ouellet-Rousseau	3,200	7.57	
Québec solidaire	Anne-Marie Melançon	2,760	6.53	
Parti nul	Marc-André Demers	164	0.39	
Climat Québec	Jean Cloutier	141	0.33	
Démocratie directe	Michaël Bernatchez	108	0.26	
Total valid votes				
Total rejected ballots				
Turnout			76.00	
Electors on the lists			–	–
Conservative gain from Coalition Avenir Québec		Swing		+
Source: Élections Québec
