= Chaude River (La Grande Rivière) =

- Location within Quebec
- Native name: Rivière Chaude (French)

Location
- Country: Canada
- Province: Quebec
- Region: Bas-Saint-Laurent
- Regional County Municipality: Kamouraska
- Municipalities: Portneuf; Sainte-Christine-d'Auvergne; Saint-Basile

Physical characteristics
- Source: Confluence of two forest streams
  - location: Mont-Carmel
  - coordinates: 47°17′18″N 69°45′51″W
  - elevation: 381 m (1,250 ft)
- Mouth: La Grande Rivière
  - location: La Pocatière
  - coordinates: 47°18′07″N 69°54′13″W
  - elevation: 153 m (502 ft)
- Length: 22.1 km (13.7 mi)

Basin features
- Tributaries
  - left: Tête de la Rivière Chaude

The Chaude River flows successively in the municipalities of Mont-Carmel, Saint-Gabriel-Lalemant and La Pocatière, in the MRC of Kamouraska Regional County Municipality, in the administrative region of Bas-Saint-Laurent, in the province of Quebec, in Canada .

The Chaude river is a tributary of the east bank of the Grande Rivière (Ouelle river), which flows on the east bank of the Ouelle River which in turn flows on the south bank of St. Lawrence River.

== Geography ==
The Chaude River rises at Lac Chaudière (length: 2.7 kilometres (1.7 mi); altitude: 381 metres (1,250 ft)) which is located in the municipality of Mont-Carmel in the heart of Notre Dame Mountains. This source is located 22.6 kilometres (14.0 mi) south-east of the south bank of the St. Lawrence River, 29.4 kilometres (18.3 mi) north-east of the village center from Sainte-Perpétue and 15.3 kilometres (9.5 mi) south-east of the village center of Mont-Carmel.

From its source, the Chaude river flows over 15.1 kilometres (9.4 mi), divided into the following segments:

- 1.4 kilometres (0.87 mi) south in Mont-Carmel, until the confluence of a stream (coming from the south) which drains the place called "La Plaine Molle";
- 1.0 kilometre (0.62 mi) towards the north-west, until the confluence of the watercourse designated "Tête de la Rivière Chaude" which rises at "Lac des Cinq Milles" and flows 12.6 kilometres (7.8 mi);
- 3.3 kilometres (2.1 mi) north-east, to the Canadian National railway;
- 3.3 kilometres (2.1 mi) westwards, to the limit between Saint-Gabriel-Lalemant;
- 2.0 kilometres (1.2 mi) west in Saint-Gabriel-Lalemant, to the limit of La Pocatière;
- 4.1 kilometres (2.5 mi) westwards, to its confluence.

The confluence of the river is located in the city of La Pocatière. This confluence is located 0.6 kilometres (0.37 mi) upstream from the covered bridge.

== Toponymy ==
The toponym Chaude River was formalized on December 2, 1975, by the Commission de toponymie du Québec.

== See also ==
- St. Lawrence River
- Ouelle River, a stream
- Grande Rivière (Ouelle River), a stream
- Mont-Carmel, a municipality
- Saint-Gabriel-Lalemant, a municipality
- La Pocatière, a city
- Kamouraska Regional County Municipality
