= Rivière des Sept Îles =

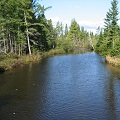

- Location within Quebec

Location
- Country: Canada
- Province: Quebec
- Region: Capitale-Nationale, Mauricie
- Regional County Municipality: Portneuf Regional County Municipality
- Municipalities: Saint-Basile, Saint-Raymond

Physical characteristics
- Source: South and east of the village of Saint-Raymond
  - location: Saint-Raymond, MRC Portneuf Regional County Municipality
  - coordinates: 46°53′30″N 71°48′19″W
  - elevation: 172 m (564 ft)
- Mouth: Portneuf River
  - location: Saint-Basile
  - coordinates: 46°45′00″N 71°48′48″W
  - elevation: 60 m (200 ft)
- Length: 26.54 km (16.49 mi)

Basin features
- Tributaries
  - left: Discharge from an unidentified small lake.
  - right: (Upward from the mouth) Rivière d'Aulnage, discharge from an unidentified lake, unidentified stream

The Rivière des Sept Îles is a tributary of the Portneuf River, flowing in the municipalities of Saint-Raymond and Saint-Basile, in the regional county municipality (MRC) of Portneuf Regional County Municipality, in the administrative region of Capitale-Nationale, in Quebec, in Canada.

Apart from the passage of the river near hamlet and near the village of Saint-Basile, the Rivière des Sept Îles flows mainly in agricultural and forestry areas, being the main economic activities of this small valley.

The lower part of this valley is served by boulevard du Centenaire, rue Sainte-Angélique which turns north on chemin du rang Sainte-Angélique. The upper part is served by Chemin du Grand Rang, Chemin du Rang de la Montagne and Chemin de Bourg-Louis.

The surface of the Sept Îles river (except the rapids areas) is generally frozen from the beginning of December to the end of March; however, safe circulation on the ice is generally from late December to early March. The water level of the river varies with the seasons and the precipitation; the spring flood occurs in March or April.

== Geography ==
The Sept Îles river flows on 26.54 km south on the north shore of the St. Lawrence River.

It takes its sources from a stream draining the south of the village of Saint-Raymond and another head branch draining a marshy area east of this same village. This area is south of Mount Laura-Plamondon (summit at 251 m), north of another mountain (altitude 253 m) and west of the Paquet airfield. The center of this wetland is located 4.6 km southwest of the mouth of lac Sept Îles, 2.2 km west of Portneuf River and 1.4 km east of Sainte-Anne River.

Course of the Sept Îles River

From the marshy area in the village of Saint-Raymond, the waters of the Sept Îles river flow over:

- 3.8 km to the south, passing near the old municipal dumping ground, west of this second mountain, crossing Lake Marcel (altitude: 145 m) and Lac des Bouleaux (altitude: 144 m), where is the Domaine-des-Bouleaux located;
- 1.7 km to the southwest to cross the "Lac des Val des Pins" (altitude: 141 m; length 440 m), surrounded by a small hamlet, near rue des Loisirs;
- 2.7 km, making a large east-facing loop, passing near the west side of Bourg-Louis (hamlet), up to Chemin du Grand-Rang where there is a small hamlet;
- 2.9 km, southerly, crossing the Rang de la Montagne road, to a small stream;
- 1.6 km, southeasterly, to the limit of the parish of Saint-Basile-Sud;
- 3.7 km, southeasterly, to a small stream;
- 2.7 km, by making several small streamers, up to Chemin Sainte-Angélique;
- 4.9 km, by making several small streamers, in Rang Sainte-Angélique passing near the limit of Pont-Rouge, up to the limit of Saint-Basile-Sud;
- 240 m to the mouth of the Rivière d'Aulnage;
- 2.3 km, to its mouth (altitude: 57 m) which flows into the Portneuf River, south-east of the village of Saint-Basile-Sud.

The Sept Îles river flows on the north bank of the Portneuf River. From the mouth of the Sept Îles river, the current descends on 13.9 kilometres (8.6 mi) the Portneuf river, winding southwest in the St. Lawrence plain, to the north shore of St. Lawrence River.

== Toponymy ==
The toponym "Rivière des Sept Îles" was formalized on December 5, 1968, at the Place Names Bank of the Commission de toponymie du Québec.

== See also ==
- List of rivers of Quebec
