= Roger Bertrand =

Canadian politician

Roger Bertrand (French pronunciation: [ʁɔʒe bɛʁtʁɑ̃]; born July 26, 1947) is an economist, civil servant and former political figure in Quebec. He represented Portneuf in the Quebec National Assembly as a Parti Québécois member from 1993 to 2003.

He was born in Donnacona, Quebec, the son of Georges Bertrand and Françoise Roy, and was educated at the Université Laval and the Université de Paris X. He was a research assistant at the Université Laval from 1971 to 1973, was employed with the Bureau de la statistique du Québec from 1973 to 1978 and with the Secrétariat du Conseil du trésor from 1980 to 1984, and was director general for the Conseil de la santé et des services sociaux in the Québec region.

He was first elected in a by-election in 1993, then re-elected in the 1994 general election, and again in 1998. Bertrand served as President of the National Assembly from 1994 to 1996. He was a member of the Quebec cabinet, serving as Minister of Revenue from 1996 to 1997, Minister of Industry and Commerce from 1997 to 1998 and Minister of Health, Social Services, Youth Protection and Rehabilitation from 2002 to 2003. Bertrand was defeated by Jean-Pierre Soucy when he ran for reelection in 2003.

In 2005, he was named president of the Groupe de Promotion pour la Prévention en Santé.
