= Sergent Lake =

Lake in Capitale-Nationale, Québec, Canada

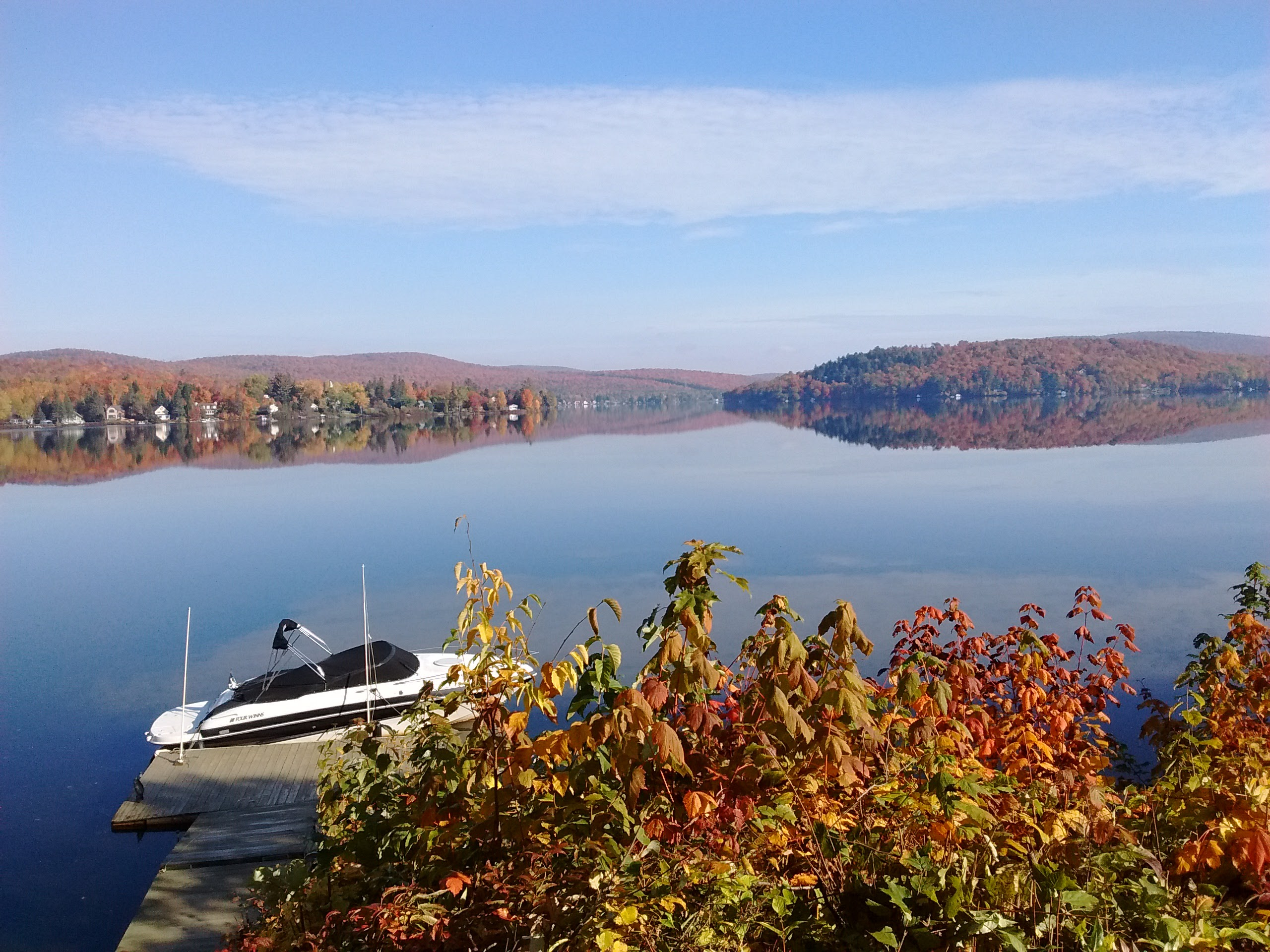

- Location in Quebec
- Location: Lac-Sergent (TNO), Portneuf Regional County Municipality, Capitale-Nationale, Quebec
- Coordinates: 46.8758°N 71.7155°W
- Lake type: Lake of dam
- Primary inflows: Several riparian streams
- Primary outflows: Discharge of Lake Sergent
- Basin countries: Canada
- Max. length: 2.8 km (1.7 mi)
- Max. width: 1.1 km (0.68 mi)
- Max. depth: 37 m (121 ft)
- Surface elevation: 154 m (505 ft)
- Islands: 1

Lake Sergent is a freshwater body located in the municipality of Lac-Sergent, in the Portneuf Regional County Municipality, in the administrative region of Capitale-Nationale, in Quebec, in Canada.

The shores of Lac Sergent have a high density of residences and chalets, particularly in the village of Lac-Sergent, located south of the lake. Vacationing began around 1896 at Lac Sergent, whereas at Sept-Îles Lake it dates back to 1857–1858.

== Geography ==
Lac Sergent is located on the north shore of the Saint-Laurent river, between Saint-Raymond and Sainte-Catherine-de-la-Jacques-Cartier. It is the smallest of the three large resort lakes in the area, the others being Saint-Joseph Lake and Sept-Îles Lake. The latter, which is 4.725 kilometres (2.936 mi) to the north, is twice as large in area as Lac Sergent, while Lac Saint-Joseph is located at 5.2 kilometres (3.2 mi) further east.

Lac Sergent is surrounded by mountainous and forested terrain; in the south-east, the mountain reaches 330 metres (1,080 ft); to the south, two peaks reach 320 metres (1,050 ft); to the north, the mountain reaches 330 metres (1,080 ft); and to the west, the mountain reaches 270 metres (890 ft). A mountain in the northwest reaches 349 metres (1,145 ft) and another 372 metres (1,220 ft) while approaching Sept-Îles Lake. Lac Sergent feeds on a few surrounding streams that descend from the mountains. Annually, this body of water is normally frozen from November to April.

The mouth is located south of the lake. Its outfall is the outlet of Sergent Lake which goes southwest on 4.5 kilometres (2.8 mi) (in a direct line) or 8.4 kilometres (5.2 mi) (following the current) because of various streamers. The southern half of the landfill route is in the parish municipality of Saint-Basile; it flows in parallel (on the north side) to the Blanche river which supplies to Lac Blanc located 1.8 kilometres (1.1 mi) south-east of the mouth of Lac Sergent. This discharge from Lac Sergent flows into Portneuf River in Rang Sainte-Madeleine, 7.9 kilometres (4.9 mi) north of Pont-Rouge and 5.6 kilometres (3.5 mi) east of the summit of "Sainte-Angélique mountain".

The railroad of Canadian National (formerly the Transcontinental) which serves the top of the county of Portneuf, bypasses the village of Lac-Sergent by the south. In XIXth, the railway contributed greatly to the economic development of the sector. route 367 bypasses the northern part of the lake. While the "chemin du Tour-du-Lac" surrounds the rest of the lake.

== Toponymy ==
The toponym “Lac Sergent” was already in use before 1829. This toponym is mentioned in the 1829 report by surveyor Jean-Pierre Proulx; this toponym then refers to the territory between the rivers Jacques-Cartier and Batiscan. The historian Eugène Rouillard alleges that this toponym has its origin at the beginning of {XIXthand that this designation pays homage to an old soldier who would have lived on the edge of this lake.

The toponyme "Lac Sergent" was formalized on December 5, 1968, at the Place Names Bank of the Commission de toponymie du Québec.

=== See also ===
- Duchesnay tourist resort
