= Marcel Bouchard =

Canadian politician

Marcel Bouchard MNA

Member of the National Assembly for Portneuf
- Incumbent
- Assumed office October 5, 2026
- Preceded by: Vincent Caron

Personal details
- Party: Conservative

Marcel Bouchard is a Canadian politician who is a candidate for the National Assembly of Quebec for Portneuf in the 2026 Quebec general election as a member of the Conservative Party of Quebec.

Bouchard is a radio host.

== Electoral record ==
2026 Quebec general election: Portneuf
** Preliminary results — Not yet official **
Party	Candidate	Votes	%	±%
Conservative	Marcel Bouchard	21,817	51.58	
Coalition Avenir Québec	Vincent Caron	7,545	17.84	
Parti Québécois	Raymond Francœur	6,559	15.51	
Liberal	Jeremy Ouellet-Rousseau	3,200	7.57	
Québec solidaire	Anne-Marie Melançon	2,760	6.53	
Parti nul	Marc-André Demers	164	0.39	
Climat Québec	Jean Cloutier	141	0.33	
Démocratie directe	Michaël Bernatchez	108	0.26	
Total valid votes				
Total rejected ballots				
Turnout			76.00	
Electors on the lists			–	–
Conservative gain from Coalition Avenir Québec		Swing		+
Source: Élections Québec
