= Lac-Sergent =

- City
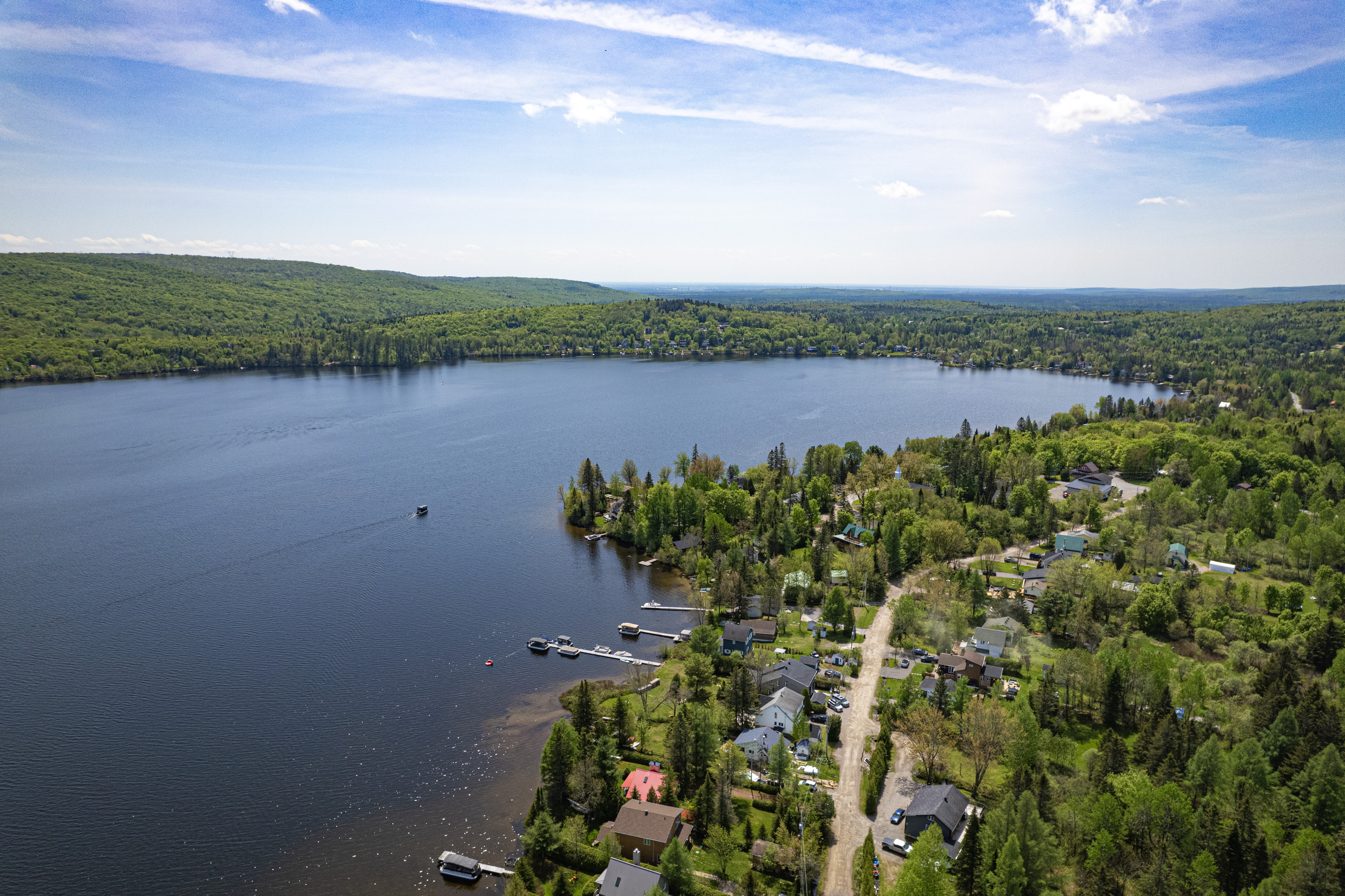

- Flag Coat of arms
- Motto: Vivre en harmonie (Living in Harmony)
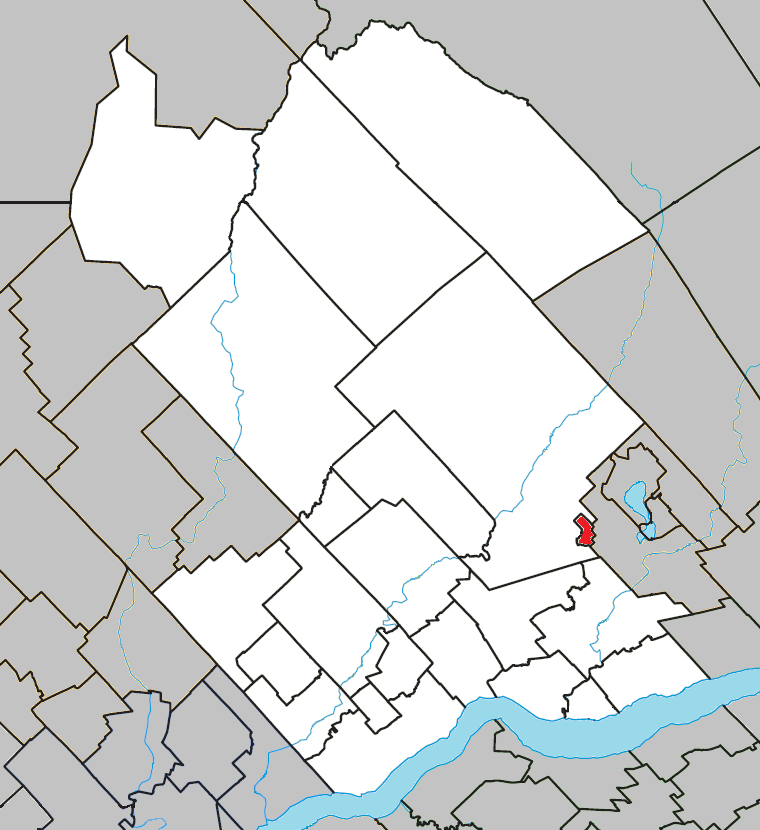
- Location within Portneuf RCM

- Location in central Quebec
- Coordinates: 46°51′N 71°44′W
- Country: Canada
- Province: Quebec
- Region: Capitale-Nationale
- RCM: Portneuf
- Settled: 1890s
- Constituted: February 25, 1921

Government
  - Mayor: Yves Bédard
  - Fed. riding: Saint-Augustin—Portneuf—Jacques-Cartier
  - Prov. riding: Portneuf

Area
  - Total: 5.64 km^{2} (2.18 sq mi)
  - Land: 3.72 km^{2} (1.44 sq mi)

Population (2021)
  - Total: 541
  - Density: 145.3/km^{2} (376/sq mi)
  - Pop (2016-21): ▲8.9%
  - Dwellings: 432
- Time zone: UTC−5 (EST)
  - Summer (DST): UTC−4 (EDT)
- Postal code(s): G0A 2J0
- Area codes: 418 and 581
- Highways: R-367
- Website: www.villelacsergent.com

Lac-Sergent (French pronunciation: [lak sɛʁʒɑ̃]) is a village surrounding Sergent Lake in Portneuf Regional County Municipality in the Canadian province of Quebec. It is about 50 kilometres (31 mi) north-west of Quebec City.

== History ==
Farmers and summer visitors started coming to the area in the last decade of the 19th century. The place and namesake lake were possibly named after an old sergeant who once lived on the shores of the lake. Another theory claims that its name is a phonic corruption of the word serre-joint, French for clamp, since the lake's shape vaguely resembles this tool.

The Parish of Notre-Dame-du-Lac-Sergent was formed sometime after 1890. Its post office opened in 1909. In 1921, the Town (Ville) of Lac-Sergent was created out of territory ceded by Saint-Raymond and Sainte-Catherine-de-Fossambault.

== Demographics ==
In the 2021 Census of Population conducted by Statistics Canada, Lac-Sergent had a population of 541 living in 263 of its 432 total private dwellings, a change of 8.9% from its 2016 population of 497. With a land area of 3.72 km^{2} (1.44 sq mi), it had a population density of 145.4/km^{2} (376.7/sq mi) in 2021.

Historical census populations – Lac-Sergent

Year	Pop.	±%
1921	60	—
1931	9	−85.0%
1941	141	+1466.7%
1951	128	−9.2%
1956	125	−2.3%
1961	162	+29.6%

Year	Pop.	±%
1966	155	−4.3%
1971	150	−3.2%
1976	103	−31.3%
1981	138	+34.0%
1986	188	+36.2%
1991	219	+16.5%

Year	Pop.	±%
1996	198	−9.6%
2001	239	+20.7%
2006	423	+77.0%
2011	466	+10.2%
2016	497	+6.7%
2021	541	+8.9%

Source: Statistics Canada

Mother tongue (2021):

- English as first language: 0.9%
- French as first language: 96.3%
- English and French as first languages: 1.9%
- Other as first language: 0%

== Government ==
List of former mayors:

- Charles-Eugène Côté (1921-1923)
- Fortunat Gingras (1923-1935)
- J.-Émilius Garon (1935-1937)
- Célestin Côté (1937-1938)
- Robert Côté (1938-1940)
- Lucien Plamondon (1940-1945)
- Germain Gastonguay (1945-1946)
- A.-Frédéric Mercier (1946-1948)
- J.-Arthur Verrault (1948-1954)
- Émile Dion (1954-1957)
- J.-François Pinet (1957-1960)
- H.-Paul Cantin (1960-1969)
- Zéphirin A. Paquet (1969-1981)
- François Desrochers (1981-1985)
- Laurent Langlois (1985-1993)
- Yvan Pacaud (1993-1997)
- Jacques Pinet (1997-2000)
- Guy Beaudoin (2000-2005)
- Denis Racine (2005-2016)
- René-Jean Pagé (2016–2017)
- Yves Bédard (2017–present)
