= Michel Matte =

Canadian politician

Member of the National Assembly of Quebec for Portneuf
- In office April 7, 2014 – August 29, 2018
- Preceded by: Jacques Marcotte
- Succeeded by: Vincent Caron
- In office December 8, 2008 – September 4, 2012
- Preceded by: Raymond Francoeur
- Succeeded by: Jacques Marcotte

Personal details
- Born: December 12, 1949 (age 76) Saint-Alban, Quebec
- Party: Liberal
- Spouse: Marjolaine Julien
- Education: Université du Québec à Trois-Rivières; Laval University

Michel Matte (born 12 December 1949) is a Canadian politician. Matte was elected to represent the riding of Portneuf in the National Assembly of Quebec in the 2008 provincial election. He is a member of the Quebec Liberal Party.

Matte obtained a bachelor's degree in physical education from the Université du Québec à Trois-Rivières and a master's degree in arts from Laval University. He worked for 23 years at the Grand-Bois and Portneuf School Boards before being elected as mayor of Saint-Marc-des-Carrières in 1997. He was also the prefect for the Portneuf Regional County Municipality. He was also a member of the Union des municipalités du Québec.
