= Portneuf (provincial electoral district) =

Provincial electoral district in Quebec, Canada

Coordinates: 47°0′N 72°0′W

Quebec electoral district

Provincial electoral district
- Legislature: National Assembly of Quebec
MNA
Marcel Bouchard
Conservative
- District created: 1867
- First contested: 1867
- Last contested: 2026

Demographics
- Electors (2012): 40,260
- Area (km²): 4,130.6
- Census subdivision(s): Cap-Santé, Deschambault-Grondines, Donnacona, Fossambault-sur-le-Lac, Lac-Saint-Joseph, Lac-Sergent, Neuville, Pont-Rouge, Portneuf, Rivière-à-Pierre, Saint-Alban, Saint-Basile, Saint-Casimir, Sainte-Catherine-de-la-Jacques-Cartier, Sainte-Christine-d'Auvergne, Saint-Gilbert, Saint-Léonard-de-Portneuf, Saint-Marc-des-Carrières, Saint-Raymond, Saint-Thuribe, Saint-Ubalde; Lac-Blanc, Lac-Lapeyrère, Linton

Portneuf (French pronunciation: [pɔʁnœf]) is a provincial electoral district in the Capitale-Nationale region of Quebec, Canada, which elects members to the National Assembly. It notably includes the municipalities of Saint-Raymond, Pont-Rouge, Sainte-Catherine-de-la-Jacques-Cartier and Donnacona.

It was created for the 1867 election (and an electoral district of that name existed earlier in the Legislative Assembly of the Province of Canada and the Legislative Assembly of Lower Canada).

In the change from the 2001 to the 2011, it lost some territory to Laviolette and La Peltrie electoral districts.

In 2026, it gained Lac-Saint-Joseph, Fossambault-sur-le-Lac and Sainte-Catherine-de-la-Jacques-Cartier.

== Members of the Legislative Assembly / National Assembly ==
Legislature	Years	Member	Party
1st	1867–1871	Praxède Larue	Conservative
2nd	1871–1875	Praxède Larue	Conservative
3rd	1875–1878	Praxède Larue	Conservative
4th	1878–1881	François Langelier	Liberal
5th	1881–1886	Jean-Docile Brousseau	Conservative
6th	1886–1890	Jules Tessier	Liberal
7th	1890–1892	Jules Tessier	Liberal
8th	1892–1897	Jules Tessier	Liberal
9th	1897–1900	Jules Tessier	Liberal
10th	1900–1903	Jules Tessier	Liberal
10th	1904–1904	Damase-Éphipane Naud	Conservative
11th	1904–1908	Édouard-Antill Panet	Liberal
12th	1908–1912	Jean Lomer Gouin	Liberal
13th	1912–1916	Jean Lomer Gouin	Liberal
14th	1916–1919	Jean Lomer Gouin	Liberal
15th	1919–1920	Jean Lomer Gouin	Liberal
15th	1920–1923	Édouard Hamel	Liberal
16th	1923–1927	Édouard Hamel	Liberal
17th	1927–1931	Pierre Gauthier	Liberal
18th	1931–1935	Pierre Gauthier	Liberal
19th	1935–1936	Bona Dussault	Action liberale nationale
20th	1936–1939	Bona Dussault	Union Nationale
21st	1939–1944	Lucien Plamondon	Liberal
22nd	1944–1948	Bona Dussault	Union Nationale
23rd	1948–1952	Bona Dussault	Union Nationale
24th	1952–1953†	Bona Dussault	Union Nationale
24th	1953–1956	Rosaire Chalifour	Union Nationale
25th	1956–1960	Rosaire Chalifour	Union Nationale
26th	1960–1962	Marcellin Laroche	Liberal
27th	1962–1966	Marcellin Laroche	Liberal
28th	1966–1970	Marcel-Rosaire Plamondon	Union Nationale
29th	1970–1973	Antoine Drolet	Ralliement créditiste
30th	1973–1976	Michel Pagé	Liberal
31st	1976–1981	Michel Pagé	Liberal
32nd	1981–1985	Michel Pagé	Liberal
33rd	1985–1989	Michel Pagé	Liberal
34th	1989–1992	Michel Pagé	Liberal
34th	1993–1994	Roger Bertrand	Parti Québécois
35th	1994–1998	Roger Bertrand	Parti Québécois
36th	1998–2003	Roger Bertrand	Parti Québécois
37th	2003–2007	Jean-Pierre Soucy	Liberal
38th	2007–2008	Raymond Francœur	Action démocratique
39th	2008–2012	Michel Matte	Liberal
40th	2012–2014	Jacques Marcotte	Coalition Avenir Québec
41st	2014–2018	Michel Matte	Liberal
42nd	2018–2022	Vincent Caron	Coalition Avenir Québec
43rd	2022–2026	Vincent Caron	Coalition Avenir Québec
44th	2026–Present	Marcel Bouchard	Conservative

== Election results ==
2026 Quebec general election
** Preliminary results — Not yet official **
Party	Candidate	Votes	%	±%
Conservative	Marcel Bouchard	21,817	51.58	
Coalition Avenir Québec	Vincent Caron	7,545	17.84	
Parti Québécois	Raymond Francœur	6,559	15.51	
Liberal	Jeremy Ouellet-Rousseau	3,200	7.57	
Québec solidaire	Anne-Marie Melançon	2,760	6.53	
Parti nul	Marc-André Demers	164	0.39	
Climat Québec	Jean Cloutier	141	0.33	
Démocratie directe	Michaël Bernatchez	108	0.26	
Total valid votes				
Total rejected ballots				
Turnout			76.00	
Electors on the lists			–	–
Conservative gain from Coalition Avenir Québec		Swing		+
Source: Élections Québec

2022 Quebec general election redistributed results
Party	Vote	%
Coalition Avenir Québec	17,889	46.72
Conservative	11,723	30.61
Parti Québécois	3,670	9.58
Québec solidaire	3,109	8.12
Liberal	1,175	3.07
Others	726	1.90

2022 Quebec general election
Party	Candidate	Votes	%	±%
Coalition Avenir Québec	Vincent Caron	15,412	47.38	-6.93
Conservative	Jacinthe-Eve Arel	9,675	29.74	+24.57
Parti Québécois	Alexandre Mc Cabe	3,203	9.85	+0.59
Québec solidaire	Anne-Marie Melançon	2,675	8.22	-3.20
Liberal	Patrick Hayes	916	2.82	-16.08
Independent	Patrick Bourson	608	1.87	–
Démocratie directe	Karine Simard	40	0.12	–
Total valid votes		32,529	98.91	–
Total rejected ballots		359	1.09	–
Turnout		32,888	73.29	
Electors on the lists		44,873	–	–

2018 Quebec general election
Party	Candidate	Votes	%	±%
Coalition Avenir Québec	Vincent Caron	15,994	54.31	+16.32
Liberal	Philippe Gasse	5,559	18.88	-22.54
Québec solidaire	Odile Pelletier	3,364	11.42	+7.5
Parti Québécois	Christian Hébert	2,727	9.26	-5.41
Conservative	Guy Morin	1,524	5.17	+3.9
Citoyens au pouvoir	Constance Guimont	282	0.96	
Total valid votes		29,450	97.93	
Total rejected ballots		621	2.07	
Turnout		30,071	70.31	
Eligible voters		42,771		
Coalition Avenir Québec gain from Liberal		Swing		+19.43
Source(s) "Rapport des résultats officiels du scrutin". Élections Québec.

2014 Quebec general election
Party	Candidate	Votes	%
Liberal	Michel Matte	12,779	41.42
Coalition Avenir Québec	Jacques Marcotte	11,720	37.99
Parti Québécois	Hugues Genois	4,525	14.67
Québec solidaire	Catherine Côté	1,209	3.92
Conservative	Daniel Beaulieu	391	1.27
Option nationale	Stéphanie Grimard	227	0.74
Total valid votes		30,851	98.82
Total rejected ballots		369	1.18
Turnout		31,220	76.00
Electors on the lists		41,239	–

2012 Quebec general election
Party	Candidate	Votes	%
Coalition Avenir Québec	Jacques Marcotte	12,605	40.65
Liberal	Michel Matte	10,402	33.54
Parti Québécois	René Perrault	5,568	17.95
Québec solidaire	Raphaël Langevin	932	3.01
Independent	Yves St-Amant	567	1.83
Option nationale	Marianne Garnier	534	1.72
Conservative	Sylvie Gagné	430	1.30
Total valid votes		31,011	98.81
Total rejected ballots		375	1.19
Turnout		31,386	77.81
Electors on the lists		40,339	–

2008 Quebec general election
Party	Candidate	Votes	%	±%
Liberal	Michel Matte	11,055	39.58	+7.40
Action démocratique	Raymond Francoeur	9,388	33.61	-12.31
Parti Québécois	Rene Perreault	6,553	23.46	+6.67
Québec solidaire	André Lavoie	934	3.34	+1.62

2007 Quebec general election
Party	Candidate	Votes	%	±%
Action démocratique	Raymond Francoeur	15,496	45.92	
Liberal	Jean-Pierre Soucy	10,861	32.18	
Parti Québécois	Martin Courval	5,667	16.79	
Green	Simon Sauvageau	1,145	3.39	–
Québec solidaire	André Lavoie	580	1.72	

2003 Quebec general election
Party	Candidate	Votes	%
Liberal	Jean-Pierre Soucy	12,729	39.44
Action démocratique	Dény Lepine	10,781	33.40
Parti Québécois	Roger Bertrand	8,352	25.88
UFP	François Paradis-Caron	413	1.28
Total valid votes		32,275	98.83
Total rejected ballots		383	1.17
Turnout		32,658	77.07
Electors on the lists		42,377	–

1998 Quebec general election
Party	Candidate	Votes	%
Parti Québécois	Roger Bertrand	15,572	47.98
Liberal	Russel Gilbert	12,299	37.90
Action démocratique	Marie-Christine Proulx	4,283	13.20
Socialist Democracy	Jerôme Larouche	298	0.92
Total valid votes		32,452	98.74
Total rejected ballots		383	1.26
Turnout		32,866	80.70
Electors on the lists		40,728	–

1995 Quebec referendum
Side	Votes	%
Oui	19,303	54.32
Non	16,235	45.68

1994 Quebec general election
Party	Candidate	Votes	%
Parti Québécois	Roger Bertrand	14,256	47.88
Liberal	Josée Noreau	10,480	35.20
Action démocratique	Jean Larose	4,501	15.12
Natural Law	Robert Royer	537	1.80
Total valid votes		29,774	97.39
Total rejected ballots		799	2.61
Turnout		30,573	79.80
Electors on the lists		38,312	–

Quebec provincial by-election, 1993
Party	Candidate	Votes	%
Parti Québécois	Roger Bertrand	10,603	51.03
Liberal	Gilles Portelance	7,066	41.42
Parti j'en peut pus	Patrice Fortin	1,205	5.80
Independent	Yves St-Amand	1,066	4.84
Renaissance	Lucie Giroux	268	1.29
New Democratic	Jean-Marie Fiset	212	1.02
Green	Pierre Saine	205	0.99
Equality	Gilles Pépin	106	0.51
Parti populaire de Québec	Léonce Boulanger	77	0.37
Parti l’étoile d’or social-démocratique	Normand Perrault	30	0.14
Total valid votes		20,778	97.86
Total rejected ballots		455	2.14
Turnout		21,233	62.29
Electors on the lists		34,085	–

1992 Charlottetown Accord referendum
Side	Votes	%
Non	17,436	63.71
Oui	9,932	36.29

1989 Quebec general election
Party	Candidate	Votes	%
Liberal	Michel Pagé	17,768	70.70
Parti Québécois	Michelle Labrie	7,362	29.30
Total valid votes		25,130	96.70
Total rejected ballots		858	3.30
Turnout		25,988	78.34
Electors on the lists		33,173	–

1985 Quebec general election
Party	Candidate	Votes	%
Liberal	Michel Pagé	18,406	69.10
Parti Québécois	Robert Jasmin	7,187	26.98
New Democratic	Gilles Harvey	726	2.73
Humanist	Jean Paradis	264	0.99
Christian Socialism	Mario Paradis	52	0.20
Total valid votes		26,635	98.96
Total rejected ballots		279	1.04
Turnout		26,914	81.34
Electors on the lists		33,087	–

1981 Quebec general election
Party	Candidate	Votes	%
Liberal	Michel Pagé	14,120	51.14
Parti Québécois	André Girard	12,607	45.66
Union Nationale	Yves Bernatchez	884	3.20
Total valid votes		27,611	99.13
Total rejected ballots		242	0.87
Turnout		27,853	86.96
Electors on the lists		32,028	–

1980 Quebec referendum
Side	Votes	%
Non	15,658	58.34
Oui	11,179	41.66

1976 Quebec general election
Party	Candidate	Votes	%
Liberal	Michel Pagé	10,362	40.47
Parti Québécois	Gilles Naud	7,579	29.60
Union Nationale	Antoine-B. Dussault	3,815	14.90
Ralliement créditiste	Roland Godin	3,741	14.61
Parti national populaire	Pierre Castonguay	106	0.42
Total valid votes		25,603	98.44
Total rejected ballots		407	1.56
Turnout		26,010	89.04
Electors on the lists		29,210	–

1973 Quebec general election
Party	Candidate	Votes	%
Liberal	Michel Pagé	12,638	53.14
Parti créditiste	Antoine Drolet	3,741	25.58
Parti Québécois	Jean-Paul Julien	4,067	17.10
Union Nationale	Paul-Émile Langevin	993	4.18
Total valid votes		23,718	98.99
Total rejected ballots		242	1.01
Turnout		24,023	85.43
Electors on the lists		28,119	–

1970 Quebec general election
Party	Candidate	Votes	%
Ralliement créditiste	Antoine Drolet	11,086	38.14
Liberal	André Sauvageau	7,981	27.46
Union Nationale	Marcel-Rosaire Plamondon	6,315	21.73
Parti Québécois	Guy Pelletier	3,681	12.67
Total valid votes		29,063	98.64
Total rejected ballots		400	1.36
Turnout		29,463	83.82
Electors on the lists		35,150	–

1966 Quebec general election
Party	Candidate	Votes	%
Union Nationale	Marcel-Rosaire Plamondon	11,265	42.76
Liberal	Lucien Duplain	9,978	37.87
Ralliement national	Antoine Drolet	4,407	16.73
RIN	Roger Thériault	613	2.33
Independent	Rolland Coderre	82	0.31
Total valid votes		26,345	98.94
Total rejected ballots		281	1.06
Turnout		26,626	81.37
Electors on the lists		32,724	–

1962 Quebec general election
Party	Candidate	Votes	%
Liberal	Marcellin Laroche	11,059	51.34
Union Nationale	Rosaire Chalifour	10,357	48.08
Action provinciale	Joseph-Laval Tardif	124	0.58
Total valid votes		21,540	99.22
Total rejected ballots		169	0.78
Turnout		21,709	85.36
Electors on the lists		25,432	–

1960 Quebec general election
Party	Candidate	Votes	%
Liberal	Marcellin Laroche	12,086	54.45
Union Nationale	Rosaire Chalifour	10,111	45.55
Total valid votes		22,197	99.15
Total rejected ballots		190	0.85
Turnout		22,387	85.36
Electors on the lists		24,551	–

1956 Quebec general election
Party	Candidate	Votes	%
Union Nationale	Rosaire Chalifour	12,810	60.72
Liberal	Paul-Eugène Drolet	8,287	39.28
Total valid votes		21,097	99.06
Total rejected ballots		201	0.94
Turnout		21,298	87.52
Electors on the lists		24,335	–

Quebec provincial by-election, 1953
Party	Candidate	Votes	%
Union Nationale	Rosaire Chalifour	10,703	56.25
Liberal	Delphis Morais	5,723	30.08
Independent	Alexandre Paquet	1,492	7.84
Independent UN	Louis-Philippe Bertrand	1,109	5.83
Total valid votes		19,027	99.34
Total rejected ballots		126	0.66
Turnout		19,153	80.53
Electors on the lists		23,794	–

1952 Quebec general election
Party	Candidate	Votes	%
Union Nationale	Bona Dussault	10,665	52.90
Liberal	Delphis Morais	8,989	44.58
Independent UN	Louis-Philippe Bertrand	508	2.52
Total valid votes		20,162	99.03
Total rejected ballots		198	0.97
Turnout		20,360	85.94
Electors on the lists		23,692	–

1948 Quebec general election
Party	Candidate	Votes	%
Union Nationale	Bona Dussault	10,506	55.55
Liberal	J.-Raoul Mathieu	5,282	27.93
Union des électeurs	Henri Doré	3,123	16.51
Total valid votes		18,911	98.89
Total rejected ballots		198	1.11
Turnout		19,124	85.44
Electors on the lists		22,383	–

1944 Quebec general election
Party	Candidate	Votes	%
Union Nationale	Bona Dussault	6,489	39.04
Bloc populaire	Pierre Gauthier	4,939	29.71
Liberal	Lucien Plamondon	4,879	29.35
Co-operative Commonwealth	Joseph-Ovila Denis	160	0.96
Independent Bloc populaire	Henri Doré	156	0.94
Total valid votes		16,623	99.47
Total rejected ballots		89	0.53
Turnout		16,712	80.70
Electors on the lists		20,710	–

1939 Quebec general election
Party	Candidate	Votes	%
Liberal	Lucien Plamondon	3,759	48.45
Union Nationale	Bona Dussault	3,469	44.71
Action libérale nationale	Horace Roy	531	6.84
Total valid votes		7,759	98.98
Total rejected ballots		80	1.02
Turnout		7,839	80.53
Electors on the lists		9,734	–

1936 Quebec general election
Party	Candidate	Votes	%
Union Nationale	Bona Dussault	5,276	64.60
Liberal	Alphonse Germain	2,891	35.40
Total valid votes		8,167	99.34
Total rejected ballots		54	0.66
Turnout		8,221	86.17
Electors on the lists		9,540	–

1935 Quebec general election
Party	Candidate	Votes	%
Action libérale nationale	Bona Dussault	4,502	56.32
Liberal	Pierre Gauthier	3,455	43.22
Independent	Alexandre Paquet	37	0.46
Total valid votes		7,994	99.80
Total rejected ballots		16	0.20
Turnout		8,010	84.49
Electors on the lists		9,480	–

1931 Quebec general election
Party	Candidate	Votes	%
Liberal	Pierre Gauthier	3,746	52.14
Conservative	Joseph-Alfred Foley	3,438	47.86
Total valid votes		7,184	99.82
Total rejected ballots		13	0.18
Turnout		7,197	84.80
Electors on the lists		8,487	–

Quebec provincial by-election, 1927
Party	Candidate	Votes	%
Liberal	Pierre Gauthier	4,198	68.44
Liberal	Ovide Mayrand	1,936	31.56
Total valid votes		6,134	99.87
Total rejected ballots		8	0.13
Turnout		6,142	76.47
Electors on the lists		8,032	–

1927 Quebec general election
Party	Candidate	Votes	%
Liberal	Édouard Hamel	3,508	65.16
Conservative	Arthur Morrisette	1,876	34.84
Total valid votes		5,384	99.72
Total rejected ballots		15	0.28
Turnout		5,399	68.07
Electors on the lists		7,931	–

1923 Quebec general election
Party	Candidate	Votes	%
Liberal	Édouard Hamel	3,356	65.52
Conservative	Philippe-Lorenzo Frénette	1,776	34.48
Total valid votes		5,122	99.40
Total rejected ballots		31	0.60
Turnout		5,153	68.95
Electors on the lists		7,473	–

Quebec provincial by-election, 1920
Party	Candidate	Votes
Liberal	Édouard Hamel	Acclaimed

1919 Quebec general election
Party	Candidate	Votes	
Liberal	Lomer Gouin	Acclaimed	
Electors on the lists		7,290	–

1916 Quebec general election
Party	Candidate	Votes	
Liberal	Lomer Gouin	Acclaimed	
Electors on the lists		7,225	–

1912 Quebec general election
Party	Candidate	Votes	%
Liberal	Lomer Gouin	3,159	61.57
Conservative	Edmond Chassé	1,972	38.43
Total valid votes		5,131	99.26
Total rejected ballots		38	0.74
Turnout		5,169	70.00
Electors on the lists		7,384	–

1912 Quebec general election
Party	Candidate	Votes	%
Liberal	Lomer Gouin	3,159	61.57
Conservative	Edmond Chassé	1,972	38.43
Total valid votes		5,131	99.26
Total rejected ballots		38	0.74
Turnout		5,169	70.00
Electors on the lists		7,384	–

1908 Quebec general election
Party	Candidate	Votes	%
Liberal	Lomer Gouin	2,752	58.89
Conservative	Edmond Valin	1,921	41.11
Total valid votes		4,673	98.92
Total rejected ballots		51	1.08
Turnout		4,724	74.07
Electors on the lists		6,378	–

1904 Quebec general election
Party	Candidate	Votes	%
Liberal	Édouard-Antill Panet	2,449	60.51
Conservative	Georges Châteauvert	1,598	39.49
Total valid votes		4,047	99.43
Total rejected ballots		23	0.57
Turnout		4,070	66.54
Electors on the lists		6,117	–

Quebec provincial by-election, 1904
Party	Candidate	Votes	%
Conservative	Damase-Épiphane Naud	2,451	52.07
Liberal	Charles Deguise	2,256	47.93
Total valid votes		4,707	99.32
Total rejected ballots		32	0.68
Turnout		4,739	79.65
Electors on the lists		5,950	–

1900 Quebec general election
Party	Candidate	Votes	
Liberal	Jules Tessier	Acclaimed	
Electors on the lists		5,553	–

1897 Quebec general election
Party	Candidate	Votes	%
Liberal	Jules Tessier	2,302	52.53
Conservative	Lawrence Stafford	2,080	47.47
Total valid votes		4,382	99.48
Total rejected ballots		23	0.52
Turnout		4,405	82.77
Electors on the lists		5,322	–

1892 Quebec general election
Party	Candidate	Votes	%
Liberal	Jules Tessier	1,952	50.28
Conservative	Lawrence Stafford	1,930	49.72
Total valid votes		3,882	99.46
Total rejected ballots		21	1.54
Turnout		3,903	79.28
Electors on the lists		4,923	–

1890 Quebec general election
Party	Candidate	Votes	%
Liberal	Jules Tessier	2,050	58.27
Conservative	Honoré Chassé	1,468	41.73
Total valid votes		3,518	98.27
Total rejected ballots		62	1.73
Turnout		3,580	74.14
Electors on the lists		4,829	–

1886 Quebec general election
Party	Candidate	Votes	%
Liberal	Jules Tessier	1,425	52.52
Conservative	Jean-Docile Brousseau	1,288	47.48
Total valid votes		2,713	99.76
Total rejected ballots		34	1.24
Turnout		2,747	68.68
Electors on the lists		4,000	–

1881 Quebec general election
Party	Candidate	Votes	%
Conservative	Jean-Docile Brousseau	1,519	54.86
Liberal	François Langelier	1,250	45.14
Total valid votes		2,769	98.96
Total rejected ballots		29	1.04
Turnout		2,798	76.68
Electors on the lists		3,649	–

1878 Quebec general election
Party	Candidate	Votes	%
Liberal	François Langelier	1,613	50.90
Conservative	Isidore-Noël Belleau	1,424	49.10
Total valid votes		3,169	99.56
Total rejected ballots		14	0.44
Turnout		3,183	80.66
Electors on the lists		3,946	–

1875 Quebec general election
Party	Candidate	Votes	%
Conservative	Praxède Larue	1,424	55.58
Liberal	Hercule Collette	1,138	44.42
Total valid votes		2,562	97.94
Total rejected ballots		54	2.06
Turnout		2,616	73.55
Electors on the lists		3,557	–

1871 Quebec general election
Party	Candidate	Votes
Conservative	Praxède Larue	Acclaimed
Electors on the lists		2,266

1867 Quebec general election
Party	Candidate	Votes	%
Conservative	Praxède Larue	943	53.31
Conservative	Jean-Docile Brosseau	826	46.69
Total valid votes		1,769	100.00
Turnout		1,769	74.48
Electors on the lists		2,375	–

== See also ==
- List of Quebec provincial electoral districts
- Canadian provincial electoral districts
