= Bona Dussault =

Canadian politician

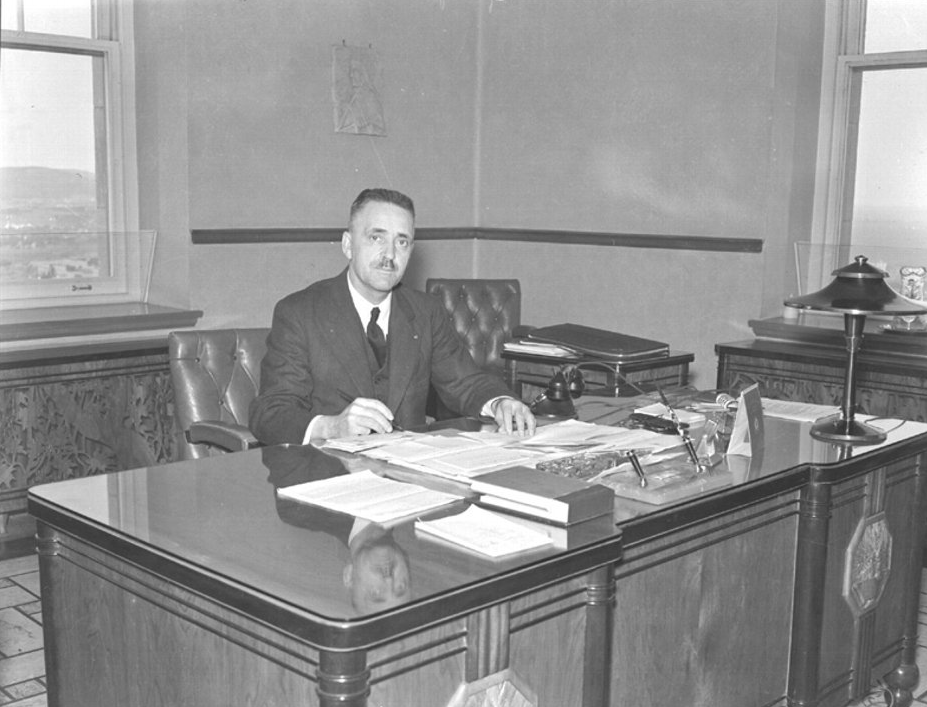

Member of the Legislative Assembly of Quebec for Portneuf
- In office 1935–1939
- Preceded by: Pierre Gauthier
- Succeeded by: Lucien Plamondon
- In office 1944–1953
- Preceded by: Lucien Plamondon
- Succeeded by: Rosaire Chalifour

Personal details
- Born: May 29, 1882 Saint-Alban, Quebec, Canada
- Died: April 29, 1953 (aged 70) Saint-Marc-des-Carrières, Quebec, Canada
- Party: Action libérale nationale Union Nationale

Bona Dussault (May 29, 1882 – April 29, 1953) was a former Quebec provincial politician and Cabinet Minister.

Born in Saint-Alban, Quebec, Dussault worked for 47 years as a sailor and a boat pilot from 1900 to 1947. Dussault also was mayor of the town of Saint-Marc-des-Carrières and was the prefect of Portneuf County near Quebec City.

After failing to win a seat in the House of Commons of Canada in the 1935 election, Dussault was first elected in the Legislative Assembly of Quebec in 1935 as member of Paul Gouin's Action libérale nationale which, shortly after, became the Union Nationale after a merger with the Quebec Conservative Party which was led by Maurice Duplessis. Dussault remained as MLA from 1935 to 1939 and from 1944 until his death in 1953. From 1936 to 1939 he served as the Minister of Agriculture and from 1944 to 1953, the Minister of Municipal Affairs both in the Duplessis Cabinet.
