= Sept Îles Lake (Saint-Raymond) =

Body of water in Quebec, Canada

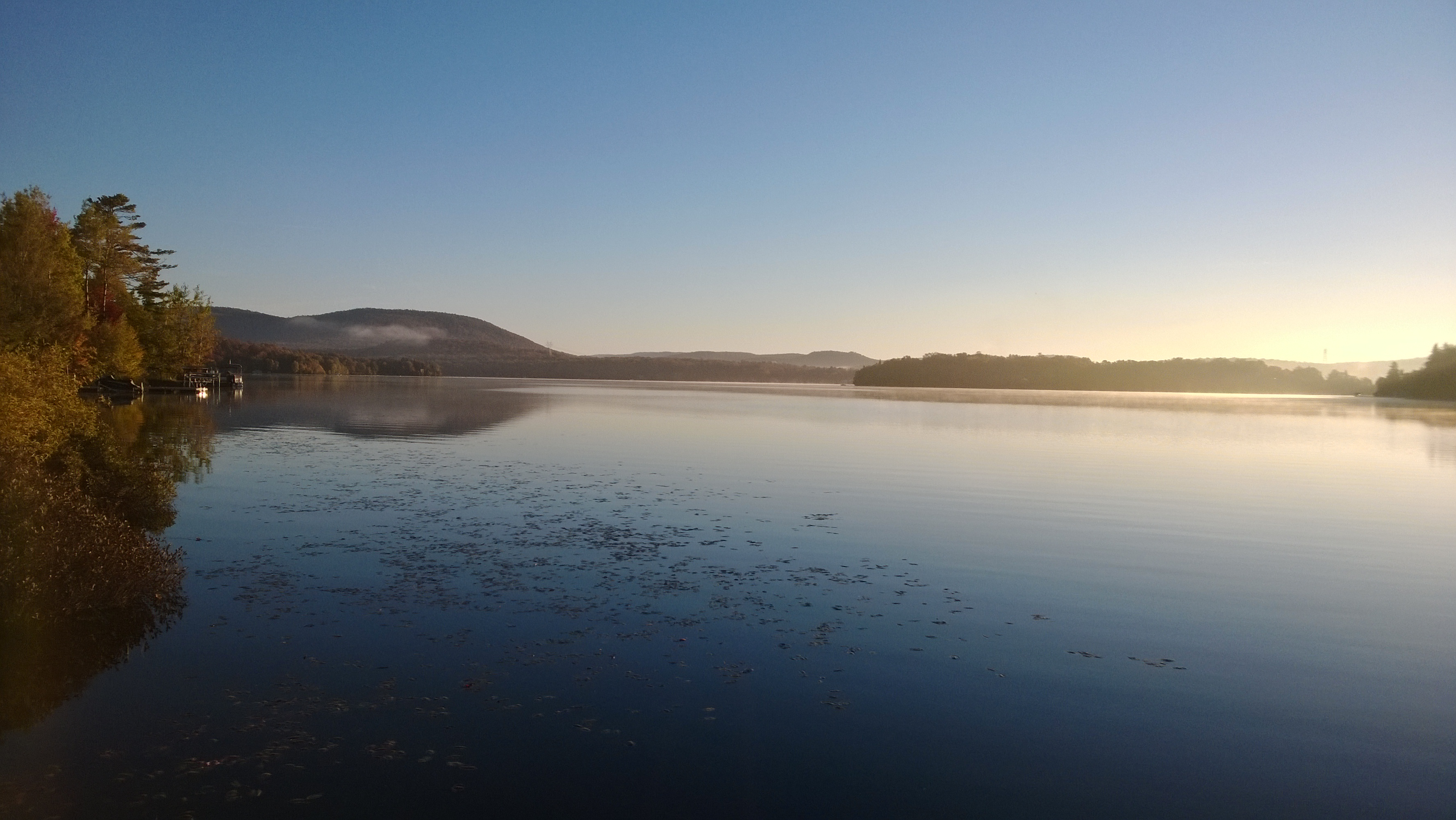

- Location in Quebec
- Location: Saint-Raymond (municipality), Portneuf Regional County Municipality, Capitale-Nationale, Quebec, Canada
- Coordinates: 46.9338°N 71.7466°W
- Lake type: Naturel
- Primary inflows: (Clockwise from the mouth) Gosford River, discharge of Lac au Chien and discharge of Lac au Cèdre
- Primary outflows: Portneuf River
- Basin countries: Canada
- Max. length: 4.2 km (2.6 mi)
- Max. width: 2.2 km (1.4 mi)
- Max. depth: 37 m (121 ft)
- Surface elevation: 209 m (686 ft)

The Lac Sept Îles (sometimes spelled Lac aux Sept-Isles) (English: Seven Islands Lake) is a body of water located in the township of Gosford, in the municipality of Saint-Raymond, in the Portneuf Regional County Municipality, in the administrative region of Capitale-Nationale, in Quebec, in Canada.

Thanks to its forest and mountain environment, its islands and bays, its proximity to Quebec city, and the Duchesnay tourist resort, the area around the lake is highly developed. A road completely surrounds the lake to serve residents and vacationers, an activity that dates to 1857–1858, compared to 1896 at Sergent Lake.

== Geography ==
The Lake Sept Îles is located 6 km (3.7 mi) northeast of the village center of Saint-Raymond, in Portneuf Regional County Municipality; 2.3 km (1.4 mi) from Sergent Lake (located to the south) and 2.2 km (1.4 mi) from Saint-Joseph Lake (La Jacques-Cartier) (located to the south-east). Lake Sespt-Îles is mainly supplied by three tributaries:

- north-west: the Gosford River flowing mountains 5.7 km (3.5 mi) south-west (parallel to the Sainte-Anne River, to flow to the bottom a narrow bay which ends at the mouth of Lac des Aulnaies which is separated from Lac Sept Îles by a bridge;
- northeast: the Lac au Chien pass (0.9 km (0.56 mi) long) which links Lac au Chien (altitude of 209 m [686 ft]) and lake Sept Îles. Lac au Chien itself is fed by Lac à la Perche (217 m [712 ft]), Lac du Ventre Rouge (227 m [745 ft]), Lac des Roches, Lac Maher (241 m [791 ft]) and Lac aux Deux Truites (230 m [750 ft]);
- south-east: the outlet (about 680 m (2,230 ft) long) from Lac au Cèdre (altitude 224 m [735 ft]).

Lake Sept-Îles is surrounded by mountain peaks that reach:

- north: between 397 and 533 m (1,302 and 1,749 ft)
- south-east: between 267 and 381 m (876 and 1,250 ft)
- south: between 349 and 372 m (1,145 and 1,220 ft)
- west: 254 and 335 m (833 and 1,099 ft)

The lake has several bays including Vachon Bay (to the southeast). The mouth of the lake is located southwest of the lake. The outlet of the lake is the Portneuf River which flows southwest to the town of Portneuf where its waters flow into the St. Lawrence River.

== Toponymy ==
The lake is aptly named because it has exactly seven islands, three islands and four islets. Colonization around the lake began around 1857–1858; eleven families were listed there in 1861, while the population of Saint-Raymond was then 2,902 inhabitants. During the 20th century, the perimeter of the lake was fitted out with numerous houses and chalets. The island of Genois, the largest and not accessible by road, has around twenty homes. The other islands contain some habitations.

The toponym “Lac Sept Îles” was formalized on December 5, 1968, at the Bank of Place Names of the Commission de toponymie du Québec.
