= Vincent Caron =

Canadian politician

Member of the National Assembly of Quebec for Portneuf
- In office October 1, 2018 – October 5, 2026
- Preceded by: Michel Matte
- Succeeded by: Marcel Bouchard

Personal details
- Party: Coalition Avenir Québec

Vincent Caron is a Canadian politician, who was elected to the National Assembly of Quebec in the 2018 provincial election. He represented the electoral district of Portneuf as a member of the Coalition Avenir Québec until his defeat in the 2026 Quebec general election.

== Electoral record ==
2026 Quebec general election: Portneuf
** Preliminary results — Not yet official **
Party	Candidate	Votes	%	±%
Conservative	Marcel Bouchard	21,817	51.58	
Coalition Avenir Québec	Vincent Caron	7,545	17.84	
Parti Québécois	Raymond Francœur	6,559	15.51	
Liberal	Jeremy Ouellet-Rousseau	3,200	7.57	
Québec solidaire	Anne-Marie Melançon	2,760	6.53	
Parti nul	Marc-André Demers	164	0.39	
Climat Québec	Jean Cloutier	141	0.33	
Démocratie directe	Michaël Bernatchez	108	0.26	
Total valid votes				
Total rejected ballots				
Turnout			76.00	
Electors on the lists			–	–
Conservative gain from Coalition Avenir Québec		Swing		+
Source: Élections Québec

2022 Quebec general election: Portneuf
Party	Candidate	Votes	%	±%
Coalition Avenir Québec	Vincent Caron	15,412	47.38	-6.93
Conservative	Jacinthe-Eve Arel	9,675	29.74	+24.57
Parti Québécois	Alexandre Mc Cabe	3,203	9.85	+0.59
Québec solidaire	Anne-Marie Melançon	2,675	8.22	-3.20
Liberal	Patrick Hayes	916	2.82	-16.08
Independent	Patrick Bourson	608	1.87	–
Démocratie directe	Karine Simard	40	0.12	–
Total valid votes		32,529	98.91	–
Total rejected ballots		359	1.09	–
Turnout		32,888	73.29	
Electors on the lists		44,873	–	–

2018 Quebec general election: Portneuf
Party	Candidate	Votes	%	±%
Coalition Avenir Québec	Vincent Caron	15,994	54.31	+16.32
Liberal	Philippe Gasse	5,559	18.88	-22.54
Québec solidaire	Odile Pelletier	3,364	11.42	+7.5
Parti Québécois	Christian Hébert	2,727	9.26	-5.41
Conservative	Guy Morin	1,524	5.17	+3.9
Citoyens au pouvoir	Constance Guimont	282	0.96	
Total valid votes		29,450	97.93	
Total rejected ballots		621	2.07	
Turnout		30,071	70.31	
Eligible voters		42,771		
Coalition Avenir Québec gain from Liberal		Swing		+19.43
Source(s) "Rapport des résultats officiels du scrutin". Élections Québec.
