= Jacques Marcotte =

Canadian politician

MNA for Portneuf
- In office 2012–2014
- Preceded by: Michel Matte
- Succeeded by: Michel Matte

Personal details
- Party: Coalition Avenir Québec

Jacques Marcotte is a Canadian politician. He was a member of the National Assembly of Quebec for the riding of Portneuf, first elected in the 2012 election. He was defeated in the 2014 election.

Prior to his election to the legislature, Marcotte served as mayor of Sainte-Catherine-de-la-Jacques-Cartier from 1996 to 2012.
