= Antoine Drolet =

Canadian politician

Member of the National Assembly of Quebec for Portneuf
- In office 1970–1973

Personal details
- Born: March 26, 1940; Donnacona, Quebec, Canada
- Political party: Ralliement créditiste
- Occupation: Politician

Antoine Drolet (born March 26, 1940) was a politician in Quebec, Canada and a Member of the National Assembly of Quebec (MNA).

== Background ==
He was born in Donnacona, Quebec, on March 26, 1940, and was a Social Credit activist in the 1960s.

== Political career ==
Drolet ran as a Ralliement national candidate in 1966 and finished third in the provincial district of Portneuf.

He ran as a candidate of the Ralliement créditiste in 1970 and won.

During his term of office, the party was plagued by internal divisions. While three MNAs remained loyal to Leader Camil Samson, Drolet and the rest of the caucus withdrew their support and appointed Armand Bois as temporary leader, until a leadership convention could determine a new leader.

Eventually, the Samson faction re-joined the party and Yvon Dupuis was chosen as leader. Drolet succeeded Aurèle Audet as House Whip.

He lost re-election in 1973 against Liberal candidate Michel Pagé.

== See also ==
- History of Quebec

== Footnotes ==
National Assembly of Quebec
Preceded by Marcel-Rosaire Plamondon (Union Nationale)	MNA for Portneuf; 1970–1973	Succeeded by Michel Pagé (Liberal)
