= Jean-Pierre Soucy =

Canadian politician, educator, and civil servant

Jean-Pierre Soucy (born December 20, 1952) is an educator, civil servant and former politician in Quebec. He represented Portneuf in the Quebec National Assembly from 2003 to 2007 as a Liberal.

He was born in Quebec City, the son of André Soucy and Gérardine Côté, and was educated at the Université Laval, the Université du Québec à Montréal and the Université de Sherbrooke. He taught English and Physical Education at Sainte-Catherine-de-la-Jacques-Cartier. Soucy was director general for Fossambault-sur-le-Lac from 1995 to 1999 and for the Regional Municipality of Portneuf from 2000 to 2003. He was mayor of Shannon from 1989 to 1995 and prefect for Jacques-Cartier from 1993 to 1995. In 2007, he became director general for the Portneuf school board.
