= Portneuf, Quebec =

Portneuf
- City
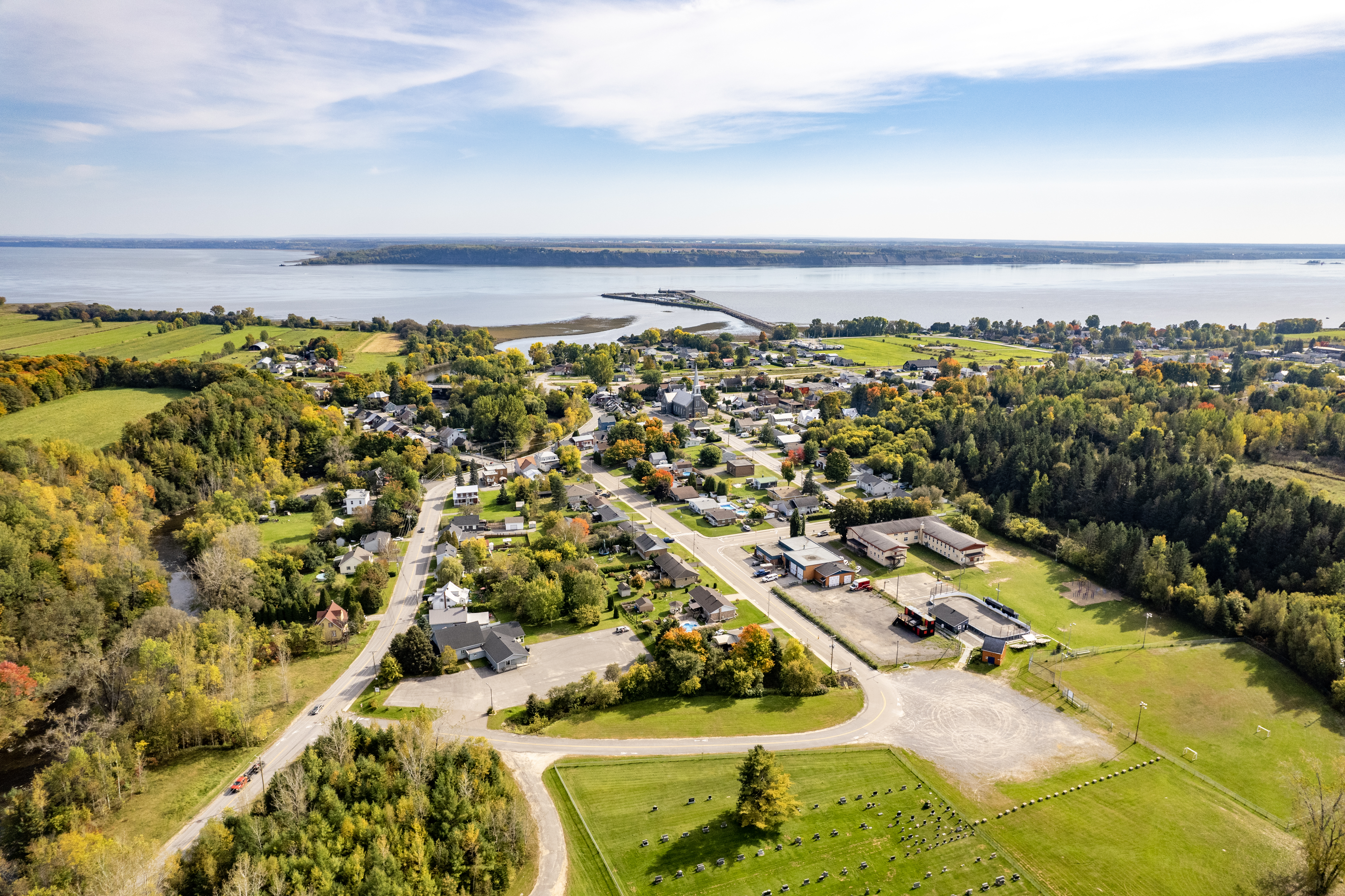

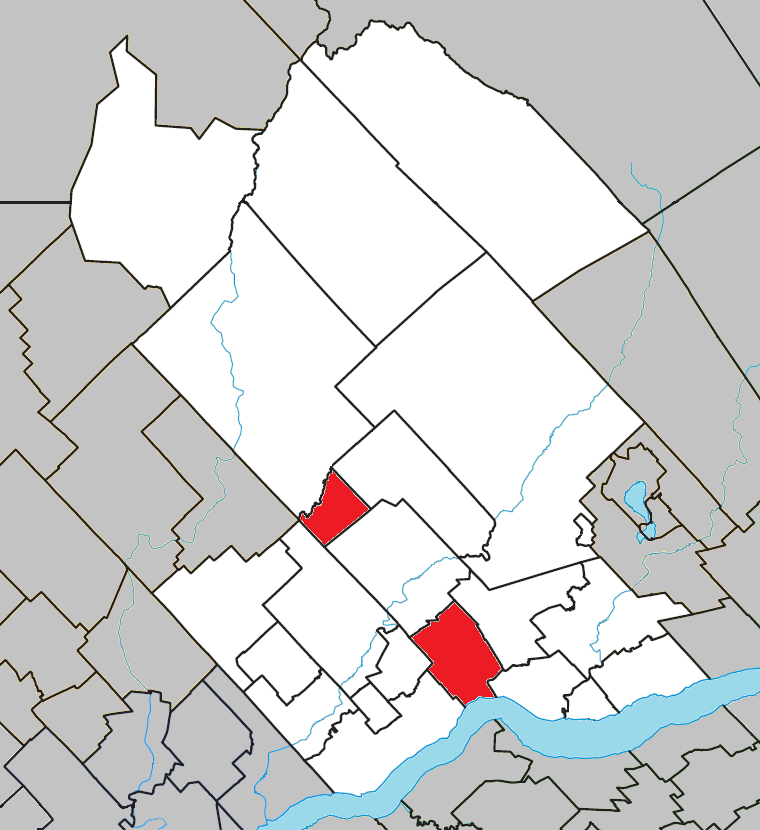
- Location within Portneuf RCM

- Location in central Quebec
- Coordinates: 46°42′N 71°53′W
- Country: Canada
- Province: Quebec
- Region: Capitale-Nationale
- RCM: Portneuf
- Settled: 1640
- Constituted: July 4, 2002

Government
  - Mayor: Mario Alain
  - Fed. riding: Saint-Augustin—Portneuf—Jacques-Cartier
  - Prov. riding: Portneuf

Area
  - City: 117.16 km^{2} (45.24 sq mi)
  - Land: 109.10 km^{2} (42.12 sq mi)
  - Urban: 3.11 km^{2} (1.20 sq mi)

Population (2021)
  - City: 3,329
  - Density: 30.5/km^{2} (79/sq mi)
  - Urban: 2,107
  - Urban density: 676.9/km^{2} (1,753/sq mi)
  - Pop (2016-21): ▲4.5%
  - Dwellings: 1,696
- Demonym: Portneuvien(ienne)
- Time zone: UTC−5 (EST)
  - Summer (DST): UTC−4 (EDT)
- Postal code(s): G0A 2Y0
- Area codes: 418 and 581
- Highways A-40: R-138
- Website: villedeportneuf.com

Portneuf (French pronunciation: [pɔʁnœf]) is a municipality in the Portneuf Regional County Municipality, in the province of Quebec, Canada. It is located on the St. Lawrence River, between Quebec City and Trois-Rivières. The Portneuf River runs on the east side of the town centre.

The town of Portneuf is named after a seignory that was founded in 1636, and first settled in 1640.

The municipal territory consists of 2 non-contiguous areas, separated by the municipality of Sainte-Christine-d'Auvergne. The smaller northern portion is undeveloped, whereas the southern piece is the main inhabited part with the population centres of Portneuf (south of Autoroute 40), and the adjacent Notre-Dame-de-Portneuf, north of A-40. The present-day municipality was created in 2002, when the old city of Portneuf merged with the town of Notre-Dame-de-Portneuf.

The town is located on the Chemin du Roy, a historic segment of Quebec Route 138 that stretches from near Montreal to Quebec City. The town is also close by to A-40, where Provencher Street connects to the town at Exit 261.

One of Portneuf's major employers is a local paper mill owned by Metro Paper Industries, a Toronto-based paper company. Paper had been a major part of Portneuf's development since the first paper mill opened in 1839.

== History ==
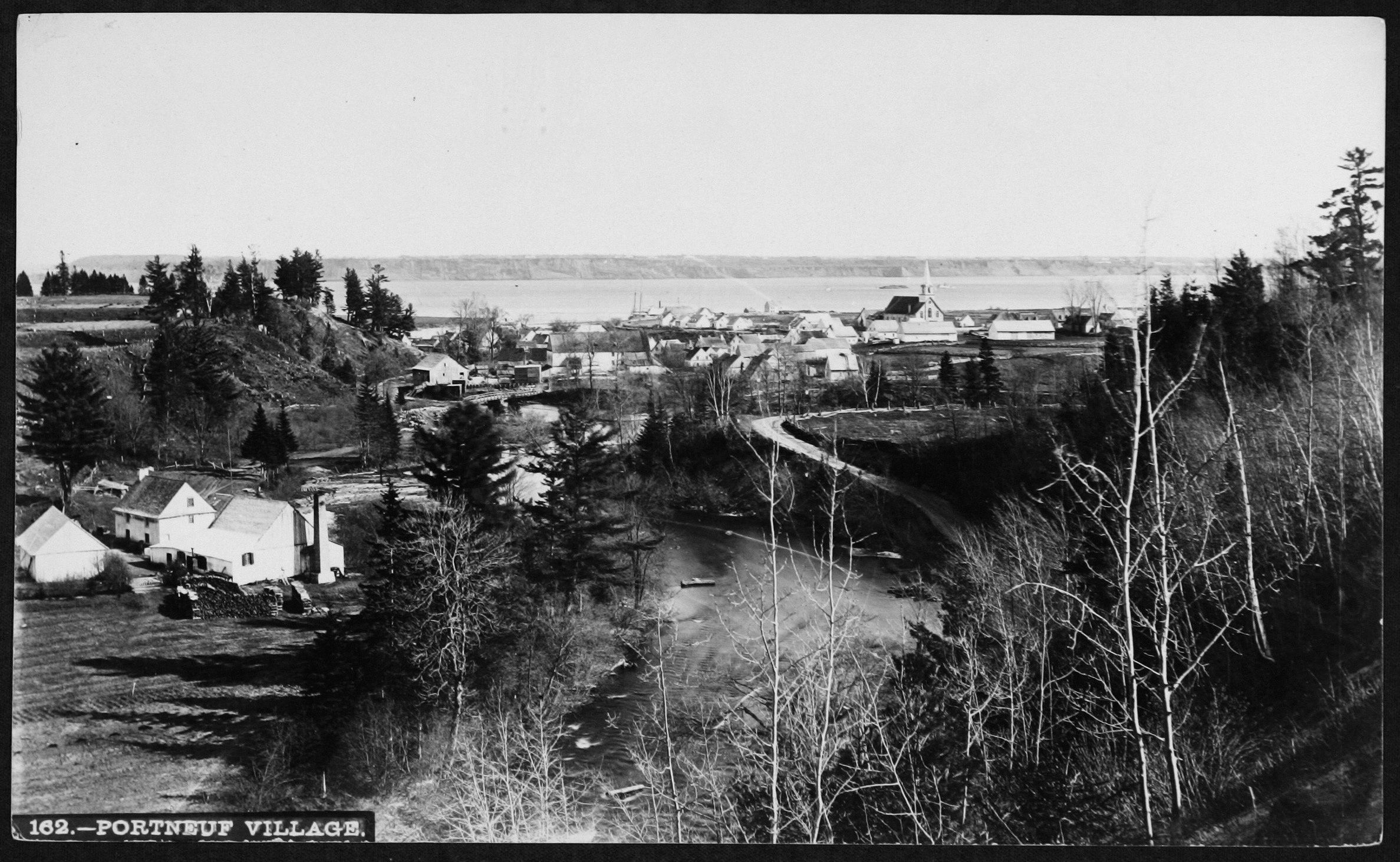
Village of Portneuf, around 1900

In 1636, the area was granted by the Compagnie de la Nouvelle-France as a seignory to Jacques Leneuf de La Poterie (1606-after 1685), who arrived in Quebec only some months later and became substitute governor of Trois-Rivières from 1645 to 1662. The first colonizers came around 1640 and settled at the mouth of the "Port Neuf" River (meaning new harbour).

In 1817, the Portneuf post office opened. In 1861, the Parish of Notre-Dame-de-Portneuf was formed, and two years later in 1863, it was incorporated as a parish municipality. In 1896, it lost a large portion of its territory when the Parish Municipality of Sainte-Christine was formed.

In 1914, the village centre itself separated from the Parish Municipality of Notre-Dame-de-Portneuf and was incorporated as the Village Municipality of Notre-Dame-de-Portneuf. In 1961, this latter one changed status and abbreviated its name, becoming the City of Portneuf. On July 4, 2002, the parish municipality was amalgamated into the new City of Portneuf.

== Demographics ==
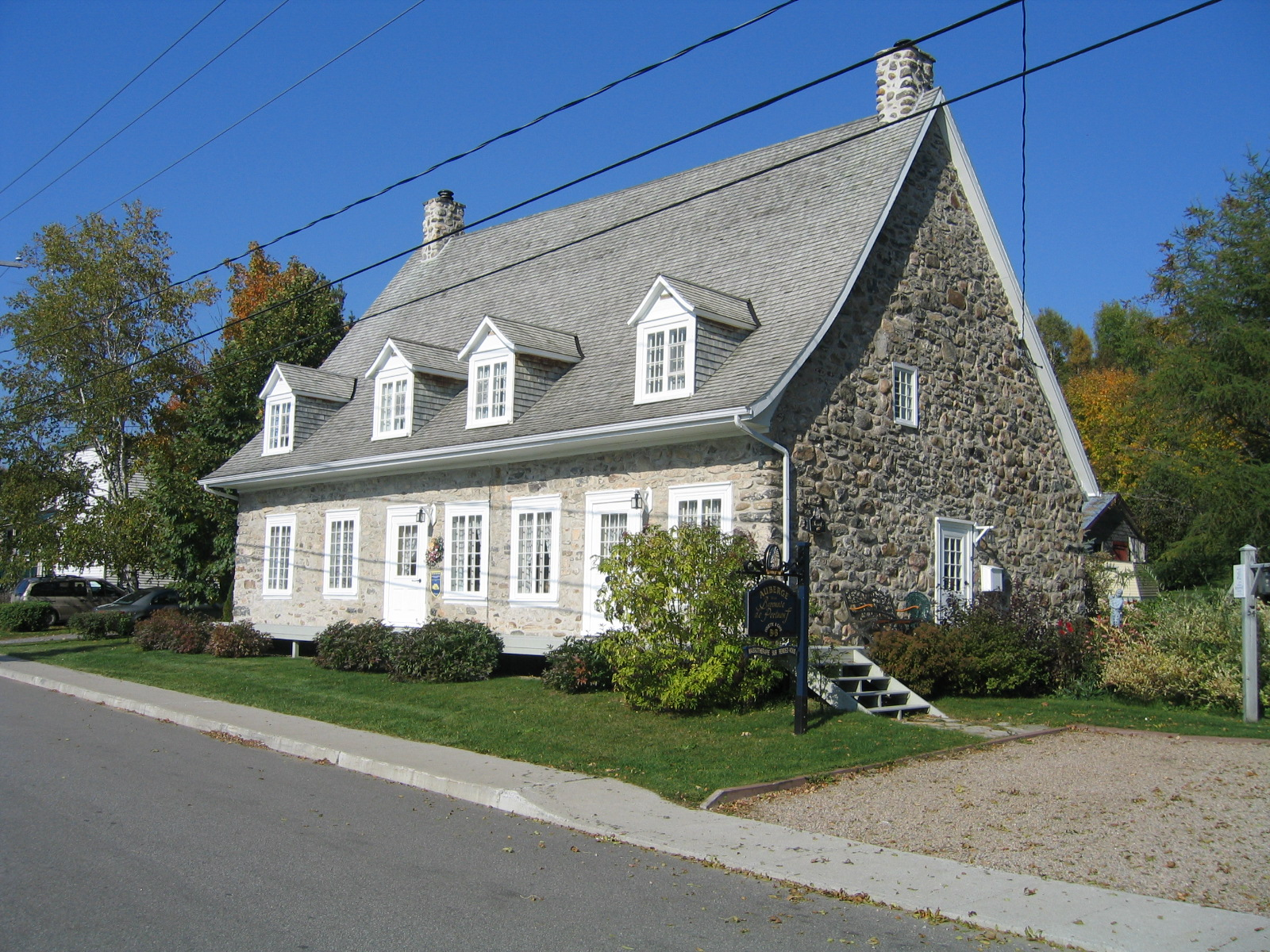
Old inn in Portneuf

In the 2021 Census of Population conducted by Statistics Canada, Portneuf had a population of 3,329 living in 1,609 of its 1,696 total private dwellings, a change of 4.5% from its 2016 population of 3,187. With a land area of 109.1 km^{2} (42.1 sq mi), it had a population density of 30.5/km^{2} (79.0/sq mi) in 2021.

Historical census populations – Portneuf, Quebec

Year	Pop.	±%
1921	877	—
1931	1,017	+16.0%
1941	1,015	−0.2%
1951	1,144	+12.7%
1956	1,251	+9.4%
1961	1,380	+10.3%

Year	Pop.	±%
1966	1,388	+0.6%
1971	1,347	−3.0%
1976	1,320	−2.0%
1981	1,333	+1.0%
1986	1,336	+0.2%
1991	1,394	+4.3%

Year	Pop.	±%
1996	1,470	+5.5%
2001	1,436	−2.3%
2006	3,086	+114.9%
2011	3,107	+0.7%
2016	3,187	+2.6%
2021	3,329	+4.5%

Population counts are not adjusted for boundary changes and merger.
Source: Statistics Canada

Mother tongue (2021):

- English as first language: 1.5%
- French as first language: 96.5%
- English and French as first languages: 0.5%
- Other as first language: 1.4%

== Arts and culture ==
Portneuf hosts a variety of annual cultural events that celebrate music, art, heritage and community spirit. Notably, the Fête nationale and Fête de la famille are annual community celebrations featuring cultural performances, entertainment and family-friendly activities.

== Government ==
List of former mayors:

- Michel Gauthier (...–2005)
- Pierre De Savoye (2005–2009)
- Nelson Bédard (2009–2017)
- Mario Alain (2017–present)

== See also ==
- Portneuf Regional Natural Park
