= Portneuf River (Capitale-Nationale) =

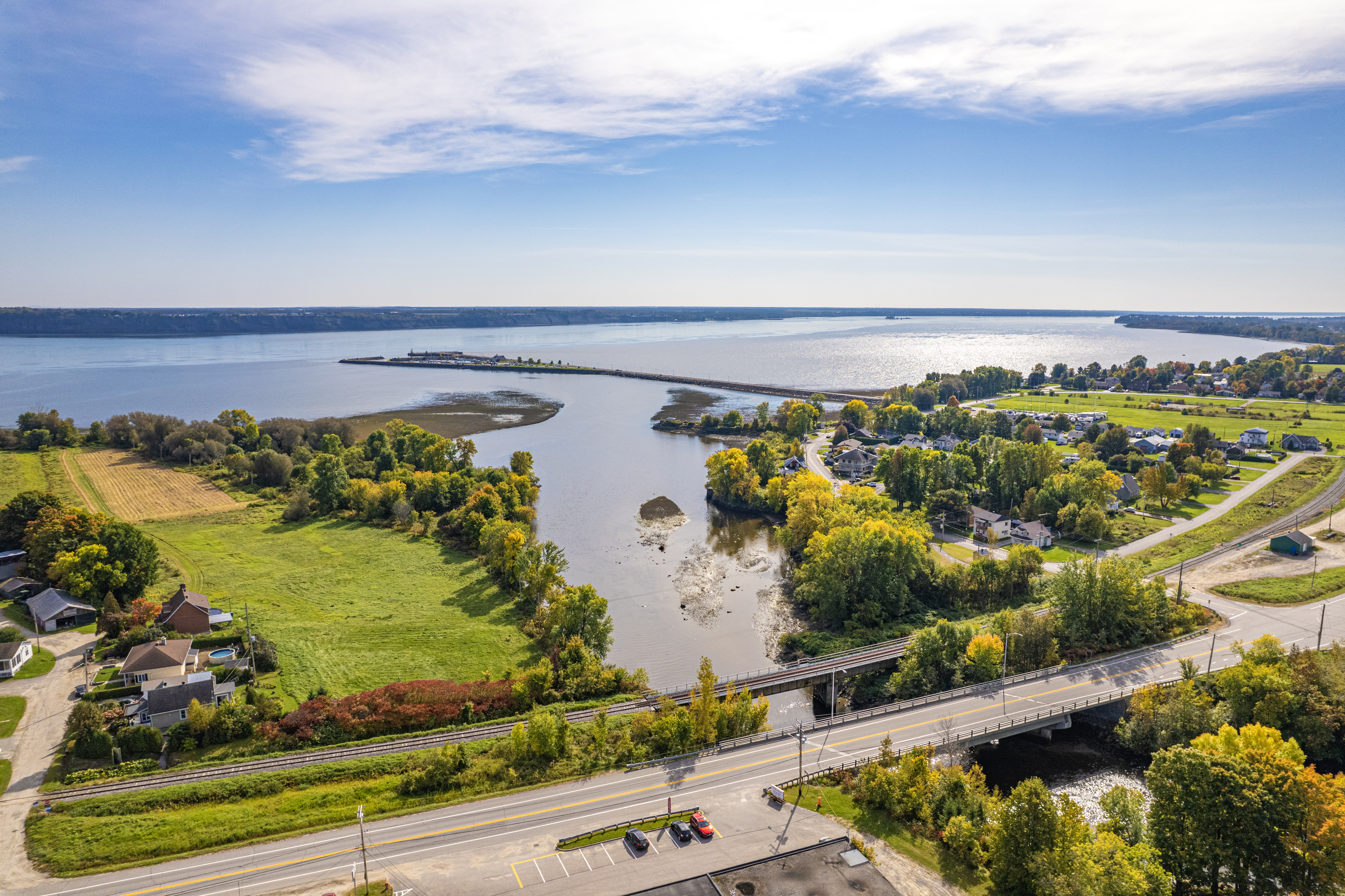

- Location within Quebec
- Native name: Rivière Portneuf (French)

Location
- Country: Canada
- Province: Quebec
- Region: Capitale-Nationale, Mauricie
- Regional County Municipality: Portneuf Regional County Municipality
- Municipalities: Pont-Rouge, Saint-Basile

Physical characteristics
- Source: Sept Îles Lake (Saint-Raymond)
  - location: Saint-Raymond, MRC Portneuf Regional County Municipality, Capitale-Nationale, Quebec, Canada
  - coordinates: 46°56′02″N 71°44′48″W
  - elevation: 209 m (686 ft)
- Mouth: St. Lawrence River
  - location: Portneuf
  - coordinates: 46°56′02″N 71°48′24″W
  - elevation: 5 m (16 ft)
- Length: 55 km (34 mi)

The Rivière Portneuf is a tributary of the north shore of the Saint-Laurent river, crossing the municipalities of Saint-Raymond, Pont-Rouge, Sant-Basile and Portneuf, in the Portneuf Regional County Municipality, in the administrative region of the Capitale-Nationale, in the province of Quebec, in Canada.

== Toponymy ==
The name of this river is linked to the seigniory of Portneuf which it crosses before flowing into the St. Lawrence River. Although this seigniory was allotted in 1636, the act of the concession was confirmed in 1647.

The toponym "Rivière Portneuf" was formalized on December 5, 1968, at the Place Names Bank of the Commission de toponymie du Québec.

== See also ==
- List of rivers of Quebec
