= Saint-Basile, Quebec =

Saint-Basile
- City
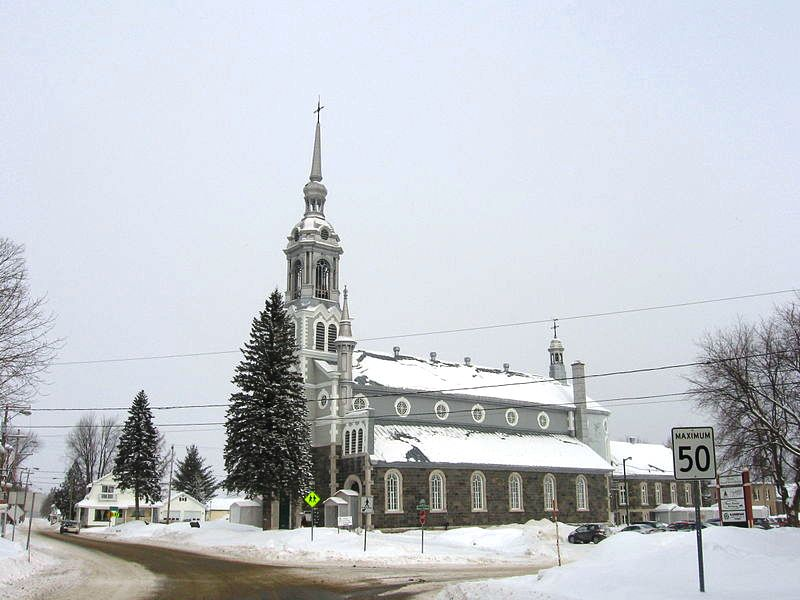
- Church of Saint-Basile
- Motto: Crois en l'avenir ("Believe in the Future")
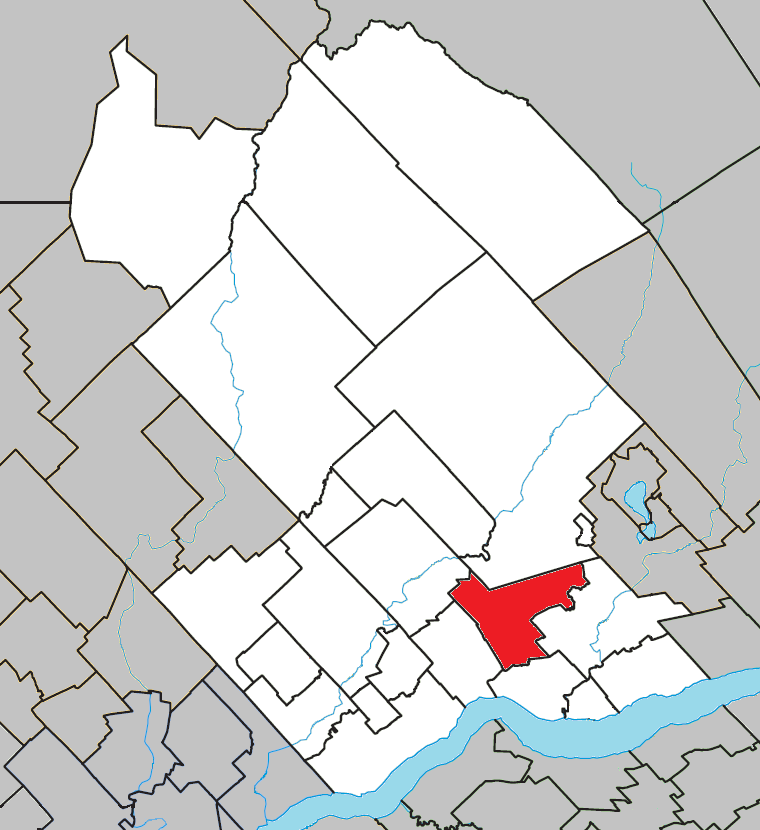
- Location within Portneuf RCM

- Location in central Quebec
- Coordinates: 46°45′N 71°49′W
- Country: Canada
- Province: Quebec
- Region: Capitale-Nationale
- RCM: Portneuf
- Constituted: March 1, 2000

Government
  - Mayor: Guillaume Vézina
  - Fed. riding: Saint-Augustin—Portneuf—Jacques-Cartier
  - Prov. riding: Portneuf

Area
  - City: 98.93 km^{2} (38.20 sq mi)
  - Land: 98.84 km^{2} (38.16 sq mi)
  - Urban: 1.94 km^{2} (0.75 sq mi)

Population (2021)
  - City: 2,709
  - Density: 27.4/km^{2} (71/sq mi)
  - Urban: 1,444
  - Urban density: 745.5/km^{2} (1,931/sq mi)
  - Pop (2016-21): ▲3.4%
  - Dwellings: 1,327
- Time zone: UTC−5 (EST)
  - Summer (DST): UTC−4 (EDT)
- Postal code(s): G0A 3G0
- Area codes: 418, 581
- Highways: R-365
- Website: saintbasile.qc.ca

Saint-Basile (French pronunciation: [sɛ̃ bazil]) is a municipality situated in Portneuf Regional County Municipality in the Canadian province of Quebec.

== History ==
The area was originally part of the seigneuries of Jacques-Cartier, Auteuil, and Neuville. In the mid-19th-century, settlers arrived from places along the St. Lawrence, especially from Cap-Santé. In 1840, the Parish of Saint-Basile was formed, named in honour of Basil of Caesarea. In 1845, the parish municipality was established, dissolved in 1847, and reestablished in 1855.

In 1948, the Village Municipality of Saint-Basile-Sud (also known by its English equivalent of Saint-Basile South) separated from the parish municipality.

In 2000, the Parish Municipality of Saint-Basile and the Village Municipality of Saint-Basile-Sud merged again to form the new City of Saint-Basile.

== Demographics ==
=== Population ===
In the 2021 Census of Population conducted by Statistics Canada, Saint-Basile had a population of 2,709 living in 1,262 of its 1,327 total private dwellings, a change of 3.4% from its 2016 population of 2,621. With a land area of 98.84 km^{2} (38.16 sq mi), it had a population density of 27.4/km^{2} (71.0/sq mi) in 2021.

Canada census – Saint-Basile community profile

	2021	2016
Population	2,709 (+3.4% from 2016)	2,631 (+6.8% from 2011)
Land area	98.84 km^{2} (38.16 sq mi)	98.84 km^{2} (38.16 sq mi)
Population density	27.4/km^{2} (71/sq mi)	26.6/km^{2} (69/sq mi)
Median age	45.2 (M: 43.6, F: 46.4)	47.7 (M: 47.3, F: 48.2)
Private dwellings	1,327 (total) 1,262 (occupied)	1,293 (total)
Median household income	$68,500	$55,040

References: 2021 2016

Population trend:

Historical census populations – Saint-Basile, Quebec
Year	Pop.	±%
2001	2,575	—
2006	2,560	−0.6%
2011	2,463	−3.8%
2016	2,621	+6.4%
2021	2,709	+3.4%
2026 Population figure based on revised count. Source: Statistics Canada

Mother tongue (2021):

- English as first language: 1.3%
- French as first language: 97.4%
- English and French as first languages: 0.7%
- Other as first language: 0.4%

== Economy ==
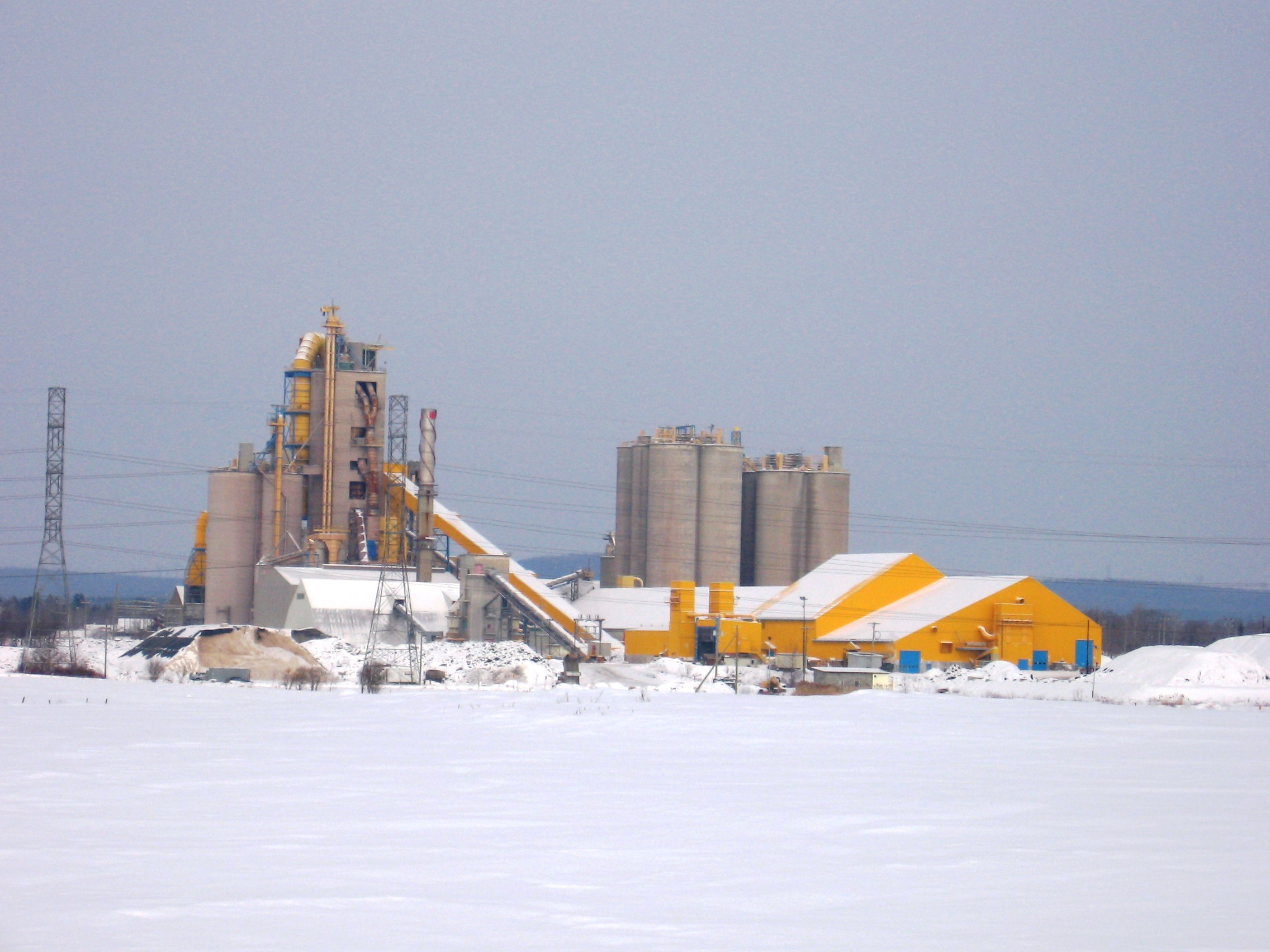
QC Cement in Saint-Basile

The main economic activity in Saint-Basile is the cement plant owned Ciment Québec Inc. Towards the end of the 1940s, cement became a rare commodity in Canada. So Gustave Papillon wanted to manufacture it, starting in 1947. For this reason, he asked his father if he wanted to participate in this project. His father, Ernest-J. Papillon, agreed to partner with him on the condition that the company was based in the town of Saint-Basile. From the first year, Gustave bought the machinery and his father took care of the financing and legal matters. In 1951, the first rotary kiln was built. The factory initially used a so-called "wet" process. In the early 1980s, a modernization of the factory was undertaken with a switch to the "dry" type process (pyroprocess). Today, it still employs between 150 and 200 workers during the year.

== Government ==
List of former mayors since formation of current city:

- Louis-Marie Caron
- Jean Poirier (2005–2017)
- Guillaume Vézina (2017–present)
