= Rivière du Cap Rouge =

Cap-Rouge River
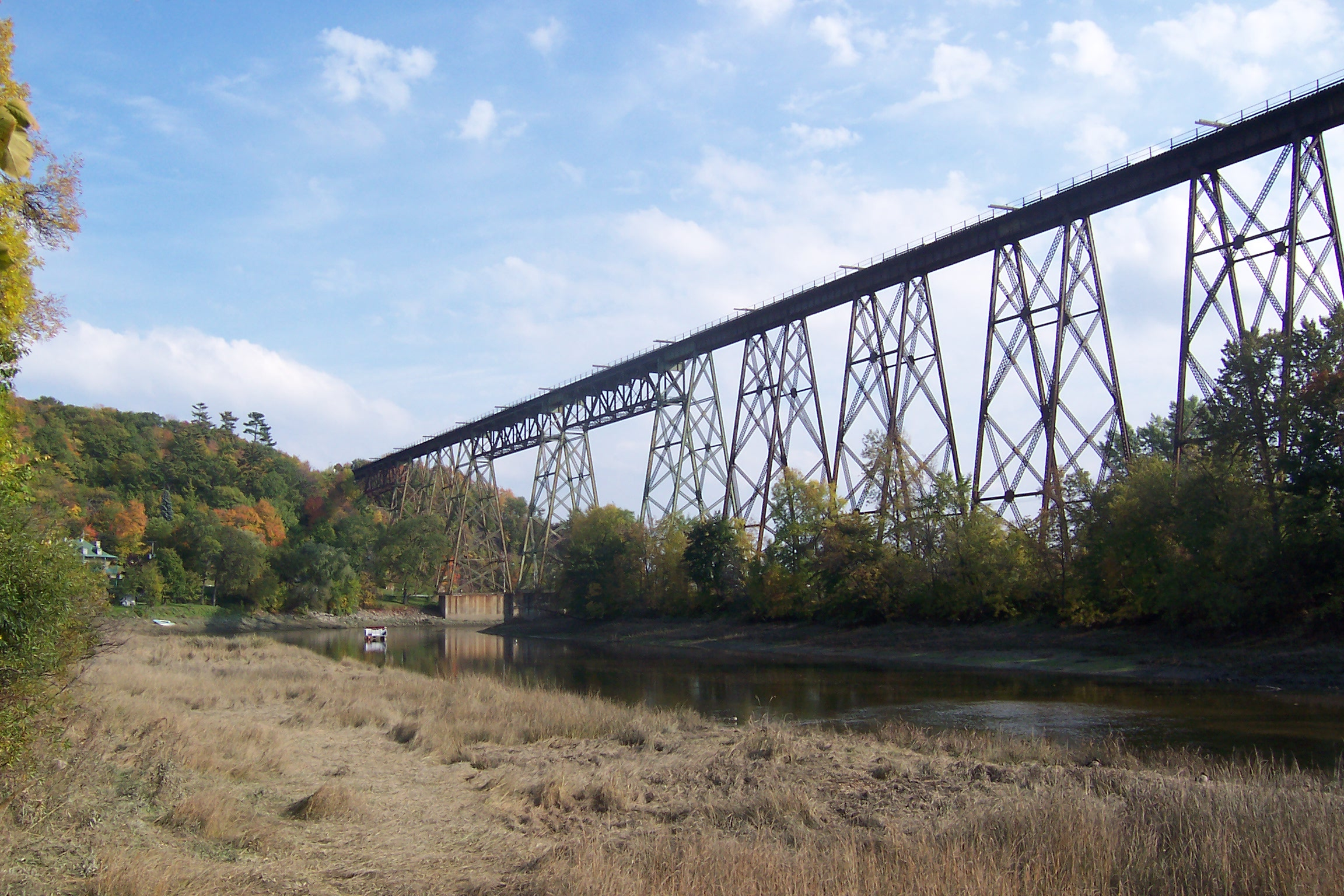
- The river passing under the Cap-Rouge trestle

- Location of the mouth of the river in Quebec City
- Native name: Rivière du Cap-Rouge (French)

Location
- Country: Canada
- Province: Quebec
- Region: Capitale-Nationale
- Cities: Quebec City, Saint-Augustin-de-Desmaures

Physical characteristics
- Source: Forest stream
  - location: Saint-Augustin-de-Desmaures
  - elevation: 134 m
- Mouth: St. Lawrence River
  - location: Cap-Rouge
  - coordinates: 46.7486111°N 71.3430556°W
  - elevation: 4 m
- Length: 23.9 km (14.9 mi)
- Basin size: 82 km^{2} (32 sq mi)

Basin features
- River system: St. Lawrence River
- Bridges: Cap-Rouge trestle

The Cap-Rouge river (French: Rivière du Cap Rouge) is a river flowing on the north shore of the Saint-Laurent River at the height of the Sainte-Foy–Sillery–Cap-Rouge borough of Quebec City and in the city of Saint-Augustin-de-Desmaures, both cities in the administrative region of Capitale-Nationale, in the province of Quebec, Canada.

The catchment area of the Cap Rouge River extends into:

- the regional county municipality (MRC) of La Jacques-Cartier Regional County Municipality: in the Sainte-Catherine-de-la-Jacques-Cartier;
- the agglomeration of Quebec: L'Ancienne-Lorette, Saint-Augustin-de-Desmaures and the city of Quebec.

The Cap Rouge River valley is mainly served by the route 367 (route de Fossambault) which is perpendicular to the Saint-Laurent River, the "chemin du rang des Mines" (on the south shore from the top), route 138 (boulevard Wilfrid-Hamel), boulevard Auclair, avenue Le Gendre, boulevard de la Chaudière, rue Provencher and rue Saint-Félix.

The surface of the Cap Rouge River (except the rapids areas) is generally frozen from the beginning of December to the end of March; safe circulation on the ice is generally done from the end of December to the beginning of March. The water level of the river varies with the seasons and the precipitation; the spring flood occurs in March or April.

== Geography ==
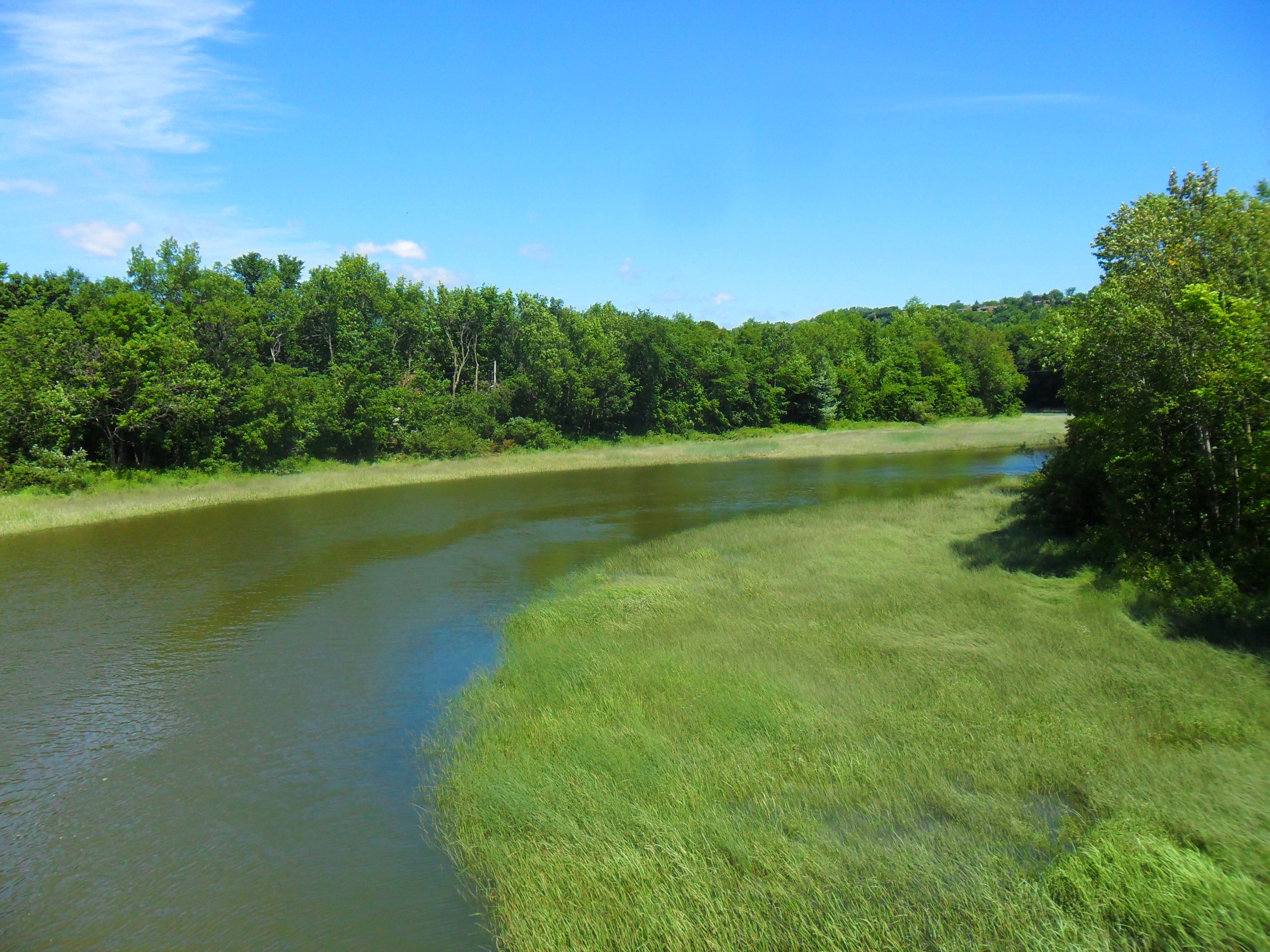
Rivière du Cap Rouge

The river begins on the slopes of Mount Bélair and the Butte du Petit-Capsa, at the foothills of the Laurentian Mountains, and flows 23.5 kilometres (14.6 mi) before ending in the Quebec City neighbourhood of Cap-Rouge as a left tributary of the St. Lawrence River. It is also at the junction of those rivers that is located the archeological site of Charlesbourg-Royal, the earliest known French settlement in North America.

Its 82-square-kilometre (32 sq mi) watershed also encompasses parts of La Jacques-Cartier Regional County Municipality, L'Ancienne-Lorette, La Haute-Saint-Charles and Saint-Augustin-de-Desmaures., where agricultural activities are found and which puts the river at risk of agricultural pollution. Measurements of ammoniacal nitrogen, nitrate and phosphorus were however all classified as "good" in 2016.

The main neighboring hydrographic slopes are:

- west: the Noire River (rivière aux Pommes) and the Rivière à Matte, in the Neuville sector;
- northwest: the Rivière aux Pommes;
- south: the slope of Saint-Augustin Lake and the Rivière des Roches;
- north: Notre-Dame brook, Lorette River, Saint-Charles River.

On its course, the river crosses the districts: "Le Grand Village", "Quartier Laurentien", Jouvence and Cap-Rouge. At the end of the route, the river passes under the Tracel de Cap-Rouge, a raised railway bridge operated by the Canadian National. The river flows into the cove of Cap Rouge in the St. Lawrence River. In Quebec City, the municipal parks of Champigny, Écores and Lorraine are also located on the banks of the river, in addition to several kilometers of trails.

From its source, the Cap Rouge river flows over 23.9 kilometres (14.9 mi), with a drop of 134 metres (440 ft), according to the following segments:

- 1.3 kilometres (0.81 mi) eastwards in the forest zone, up to the bridge of Rang Petit-Capsa in Saint-Augustin-de-Desmaures;
- 3.7 kilometres (2.3 mi) to the southeast, first in the forest zone, then in the agricultural zone by cutting the 4th range west road, the Canadian National railway, the 3rd range west, to Grand-Village stream (coming from the southwest);
- 5.2 kilometres (3.2 mi) towards the northeast by crossing the 3rd range road (west of the hamlet Le Grand-Village), the Fossambault road, by collecting the Béland stream (coming from the north- west), the Yellow stream (coming from the northwest) and the Bélair stream (coming from the north), and entering the territory of Sainte-Foy-Sillery-Cap-Rouge at the end of the segment, until the Lorette River (coming from the north);
- 5.9 kilometres (3.7 mi) to the east by forming large streamers where municipal parks are laid out, crossing the chemin du rang Saint-Denis, up to boulevard Wilfrid-Hamel (route 138);
- 3.4 kilometres (2.1 mi) towards the northeast in an urban area, making a curve to the south and forming several serpentines, crossing the Jean-Gauvin road and the Jules-Vernes avenue, until the highway 40;
- 4.4 kilometres (2.7 mi) to the south in an urban area, by cutting avenue Blaise-Pascal, rue Provancher, boulevard de la Chaudière, rue Augustin-Bourbeau, the Canadian Pacific Railway bridge and rue Saint-Félix, to its mouth.

== Toponymy ==
The toponym "Cap Rouge river" originates from Cape Rouge. The Cap Rouge river is sometimes called "Rivière du Domaine" because it crosses the former seigneurial domain of Gaudarville. Explorer Jacques Cartier describes it for the first time. At high tide, it is navigable for more than a kilometer; Consequently, in the 19th century, the ferry service was abandoned and replaced by a swing bridge on Chemin du Roy. Thus, the boats and the barges can go up the course of the river to transport the cereals to the mill, the wood and the other goods of the inhabitants and the traders as well as the raw materials, the coal and the finished products of the manufacture of pottery of Cap-Rouge. In addition, its mouth allows the establishment of a small shipyard where at least two ships are built and launched. From the middle of the 18th century, the waters of the river also provided the driving force for operating mills for grinding grain and sawing wood.

The toponym "Cap Rouge River" was formalized on December 5, 1968 at the Commission de toponymie du Québec.

=== See also ===
- La Jacques-Cartier Regional County Municipality
- Québec, a city
- Sainte-Catherine-de-la-Jacques-Cartier, a city
- L'Ancienne-Lorette, une ville
- Saint-Augustin-de-Desmaures, une ville
- Lorette River
- St. Lawrence River
- List of rivers of Quebec
