= Rivière à Matte =

Watercourse in Portneuf, Québec, Canada

- Location within Quebec

Location
- Country: Canada
- Province: Quebec
- Region: Capitale-Nationale
- Regional County Municipality: Portneuf Regional County Municipality
- Municipality: Neuville, Saint-Augustin-de-Desmaures

Physical characteristics
- Source: Forest stream
  - location: Saint-Augustin-de-Desmaures
  - coordinates: 46.75252°N 71.57448°W
  - elevation: 130
- Mouth: St. Lawrence River
  - location: Neuville
  - coordinates: 46.69111°N 71.63528°W
  - elevation: 4 m
- Length: 12.5 km (7.8 mi)

The rivière à Matte (English: Matte's River) is a tributary of the northwest shore of the St. Lawrence River, flowing in the municipality of Neuville, in the Portneuf Regional County Municipality, in the administrative region of Capitale-Nationale, in the province, in Quebec, in Canada.

The Matte river valley is mainly served by the route 365 which is perpendicular to the Saint-Laurent River, the 2nd range road, the Gravel road and the Lomer road in particular for needs agriculture and forestry are the two main economic activities in this area.

The surface of the Matte river (except the rapids) is generally frozen from the beginning of December to the end of March; safe circulation on the ice is generally done from the end of December to the beginning of March. The water level of the river varies with the seasons and the precipitation; the spring flood occurs in March or April.

== Geography ==
The Matte river has its source in a forest area in Saint-Augustin-de-Desmaures, almost at the limit of Neuville, north of the village of Saint-Nicolas. This source is located 6.1 kilometres (3.8 mi) north of the center of the village of Neuville, 1.9 kilometres (1.2 mi) northwest of autoroute 400, 5.0 kilometres (3.1 mi) northwest of the St. Lawrence River, 5.1 kilometres (3.2 mi) northeast of its mouth.

From its source, the river at Matte then flows over a distance of 12.5 kilometres (7.8 mi), with a drop in level of 81 metres (266 ft), according to the following segments:

- 4.1 kilometres (2.5 mi) towards the south by forming a curve towards the west, in the forest zone and by crossing the Lomer road, crossing a small unidentified lake, until its mouth;
- 1.7 kilometres (1.1 mi) to the south, forming very small streamers in the forest and then agricultural zones, crossing the route 365, up to the bridge of highway 40;
- 3.0 kilometres (1.9 mi) south in agricultural area, to the Canadian Pacific railway;
- 3.7 kilometres (2.3 mi) to the south by first forming a loop to the west and a series of rapids, cutting the route 365 before forming a hook westward, crossing route 138, then form a new hook westward, to its mouth.

The confluence of the Matte River and the St. Lawrence River is located 8.8 kilometres (5.5 mi) northeast of the mouth of the Jacques-Cartier River, at 8.5 kilometres (5.3 mi) south-east of the center of Pont-Rouge.

== Toponymy ==
The term "Matte" is a family name of French origin. This toponym evokes the work of life of Nicolas Matte (Sainte-Geneviève-en-Bray, 1636 - Neuville, 1704) who emigrated to New France before 1666 as evidenced by his registration in the first colony census carried out during the winter of 1665–1666. He then declared that he was 26 years old and lived in the Lordship of Notre-Dame-des-Anges. A few years later, in 1670, he settled in the seigniory of Dombourg "called La Pointe-aux-Trembles", today Neuville. It was in this place that he worked the land as a farmer and founded a large family with his wife Madeleine Auvray, a Daughter of the King who arrived in Quebec in 1671. Note that the pioneer Nicolas Matte is the ancestor of the Mattes in America.

The toponym "Rivière à Matte" was formalized on December 5, 1968 at the Commission de toponymie du Québec.

== Appendices ==
=== Related articles ===
- Portneuf Regional County Municipality
- Saint-Augustin-de-Desmaures
- List of rivers of Quebec
