= Dominion Bridge Company =

Canadian steel bridge constructor

- Founded: 1912
- Defunct: 2001
- Fate: Acquired by SPX Corporation
- Headquarters: 555 Rue Notre Dame, Lachine, Quebec

The Dominion Bridge Company, Limited was a Canadian steel bridge constructor originally based in Lachine, Quebec. From the core business of steel bridge component fabrication, the company diversified into related areas such as the fabrication of holding tanks for pulp mills and skyscraper framing.

Other Canadian plants were located in Amherst, NS, Toronto, ON, Ottawa, ON, Winnipeg, MB, Regina, SK, Saskatoon, SK, Calgary, AB, Edmonton, AB, Richmond, BC and Burnaby, BC. In the 1960s and 1970s, Dominion Bridge expanded internationally and renamed itself AMCA International (AMCA name effective June 1, 1981). This name was later changed to United Dominion Industries. To keep name recognition alive, the company continued to call its Canadian division 'Dominion Bridge'. Between 1979 and 1988, the company's Lachine plant operated under the auspices of a subsidiary called Dominion Bridge-Sulzer Inc., which was co-owned by AMCA International and Sulzer Inc.

The Dominion Bridge facility in Burnaby, BC operated from 1930 until the mid-1970s at a 15-acre (61,000 m^{2}) property located at 2400 Boundary Road. After being sold, this property was repurposed to become The Bridge Studios, the site of the largest special effects stage in North America.

== History ==
In 1886, the company began to build a cantilevered bridge over the St. Lawrence River for the Canadian Pacific Railway. Because part of the bridge lay in the reservation of the Kahnawake and Akwesasne Mohawks, the Mohawks demanded jobs on the project. The company planned to use them as unskilled labour but they climbed all over the bridge, without fear, and asked to become riveters. They proved to have a remarkable aptitude for the work and by the end of the project there were 70 iron and steel riveters in the Kahnawake band, who went on to work on projects throughout Canada.

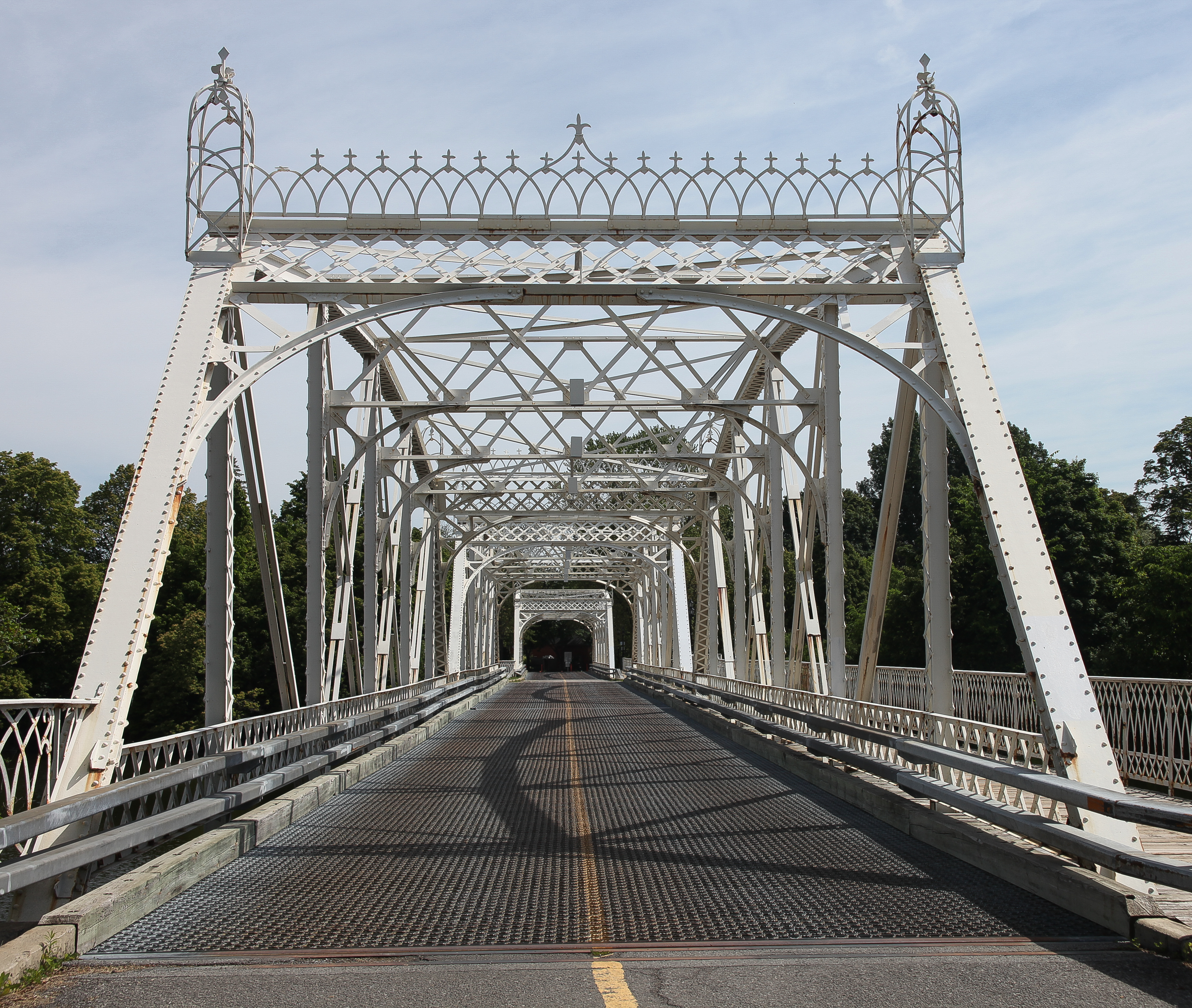
Minto Bridge in Ottawa, built in 1900

In 1890 civil engineer for various railways James Ross replaced Job Abbott as president of the company. Although credited to the drive of Ross, vice-president James Pawley Dawes lead the developed via joint-venture the St Lawrence Bridge Company to construct the Quebec Bridge. George Herrick Duggan joined the Engineering Department in 1886, becoming Chief Engineer in 1901, and rose to become President of the company. Another notable employee was Philip Louis Pratley, a Person of National Historic Significance.

In 1898 the Dominion Bridge Company was awarded the contract to design and build the Alexandra Bridge, one of Canada's most notable bridges. At the time of completion in 1901 the Alexandra Bridge was the fourth longest cantilever span in the world.

Dominion Bridge opened a manufacturing site in Toronto at Sorauren and Wabash Avenue sometime after 1910, which later became TTC Parkdale Bus garage until 1980 then demolished in 1990s to become what is now Sorauren Avenue Park. This facility provided steel for the building of the Prince Edward Viaduct.

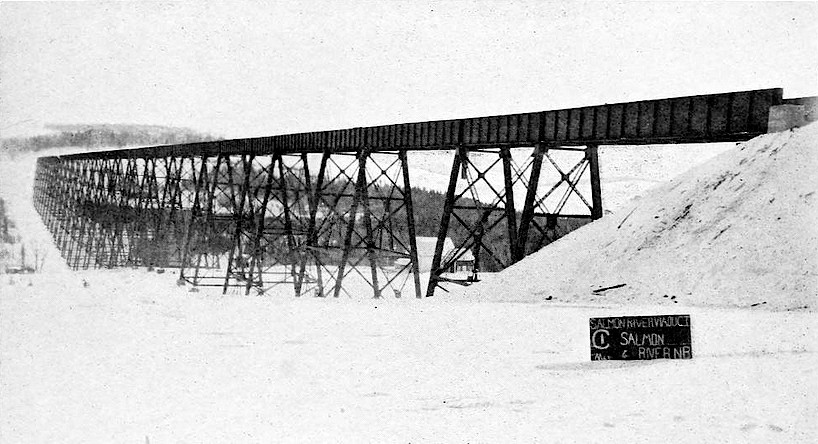
The Little Salmon River Trestle in New Brunswick, built in 1911

The company built a series of large railway viaducts for the National Transcontinental Railway between 1908 and 1911 including the Cap-Rouge trestle in Quebec and the Little Salmon River Trestle in New Brunswick, Canada's second largest railway bridge.

With a lowest bid of $6,954,000, the company secured the contract to erect the steel superstructure of the Jacques Cartier Bridge linking Montreal to the South Shore on October 25, 1925. The last girder was placed on 10 July 1929, seventeen months ahead of schedule In 1957 and 1958 Pratley returned to the bridge as the consulting engineer when the company jacked up the span from 40 feet (12 m) to 120 feet (37 m) to enable free passage of ships on the new St. Lawrence Seaway.

The company also raised the Honoré Mercier Bridge as part of the same programme. It had built the original bridge between 1932 and 1934 using steel caissons assembled by Dufresne Engineering from plates manufactured at Dominion's Lachine yards.

The company's Canadian operations experienced a major decline after work was completed on projects for Montreal's Olympic Games in 1976. The Burnaby plant was shut down in the mid-1970s and the Toronto plant was closed in 1990. Furthermore, the company reduced the scope of its Montreal-area operations between the early 1970s and 1990: the satellite facility in Montreal's Longue-Pointe district was closed, two large shops in Lachine were acquired by Sulzer Inc. after the dissolution of Dominion Bridge-Sulzer Inc., and several buildings on the property of the Lachine plant were mothballed or torn down following the dissolution. Employment at the Lachine plant alone dropped from approximately 2,000 in the early 1970s to about 250 in 1990.

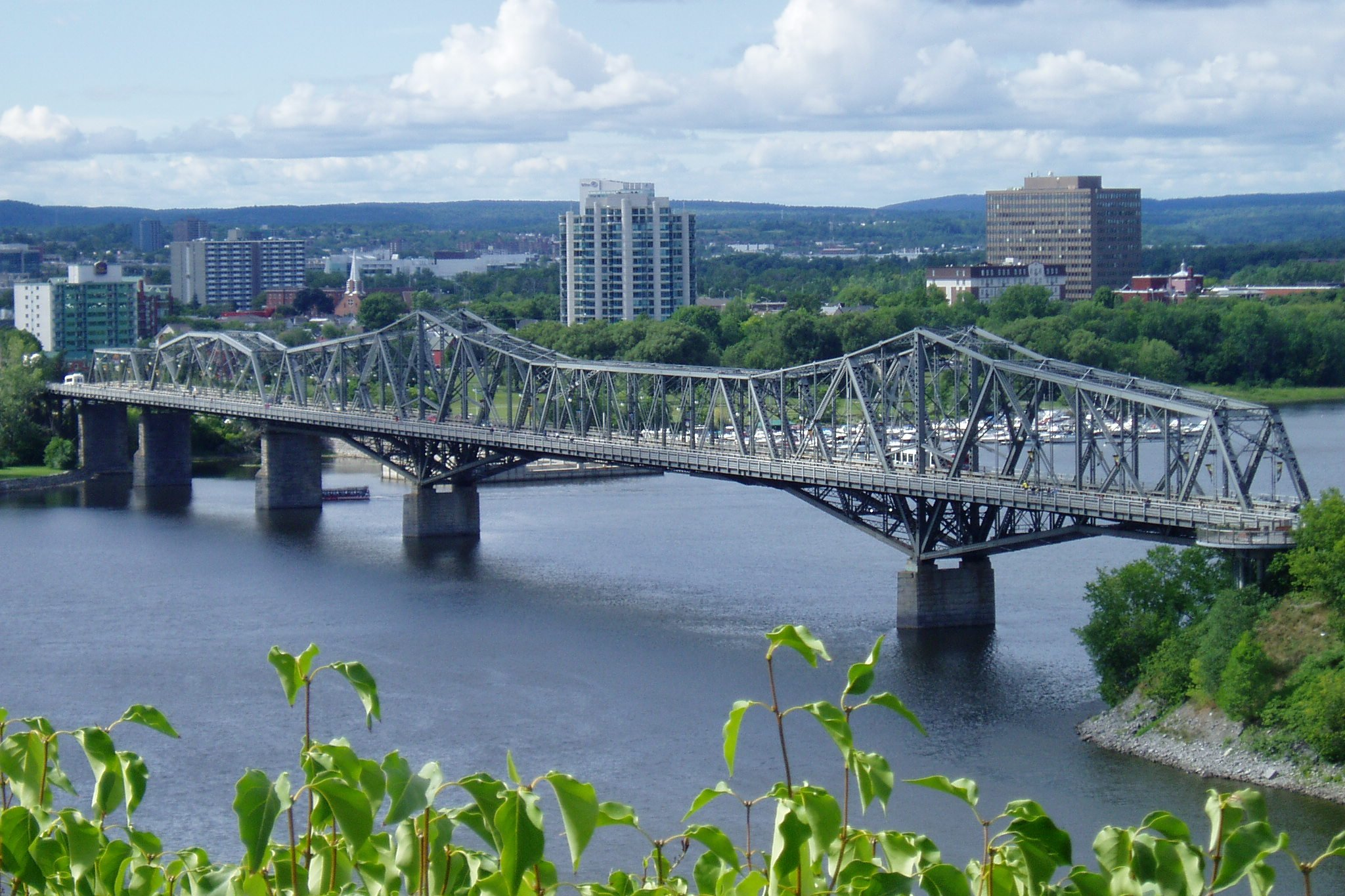
The Alexandra Bridge over the Ottawa River, which the Dominion Bridge Company helped construct

In 1993, the Cedar Group (led by Michel L. Marengere) acquired United Dominion Industries' Dominion Bridge subsidiary, which was then a four-plant operation (Lachine, Amherst, Winnipeg, Edmonton and Regina). Cedar Group kept the Dominion Bridge name alive, renaming itself 'Dominion Bridge Corporation' and bundling the four plants under a subsidiary called 'Dominion Bridge, Inc.' However, in 1998 the company made a disastrous decision to purchase the bankrupt MIL-Davie shipyard in Lauzon, Quebec. The Davie purchase drained Dominion Bridge of its cash reserves and pushed the company into bankruptcy.

Later in 1998, Groupe ADF Inc, a steel company from Terrebonne, Quebec, purchased the assets of the Lachine plant and restarted operations. Employees who had been laid off following the bankruptcy, many of whom had worked at the plant for over 20 years, were re-hired to work for a new company called ADF Industries Lourdes. In November 2003, ADF closed the Lachine plant due to declining fortunes in the North American steel industry, which had been losing ground to cheaper Asian competitors for many years. To date, the Lachine plant remains closed and ADF is looking for a buyer.

Of the other three plants that survived to 1998, two were never reopened following the Dominion Bridge bankruptcy. The third, in Amherst, was purchased in November 1998 by Amherst Fabricators Limited (part of the Cherubini Group of Companies). Amherst Fabricators rehired 43 former Dominion Bridge employees and conducted a $2.1 million expansion program to add 3,000 square feet (280 m^{2}) to the paint shop, install new roofing over exterior crane rails, and purchase new fabrication equipment. The plant reopened in May 1999.

== 21st-century developments ==
On July 9, 2008, a numbered company (3010864 Canada Inc.) that had been dissolved in 2003 was revived under the name 'Dominion Bridge Inc.' Michel L. Marangere is one of two listed directors (Search for a Federal Corporation - Corporations Canada - Industry Canada). To date, there have been no public communications about the objectives of this company.

== Structures ==
The company participated in the construction of the following:

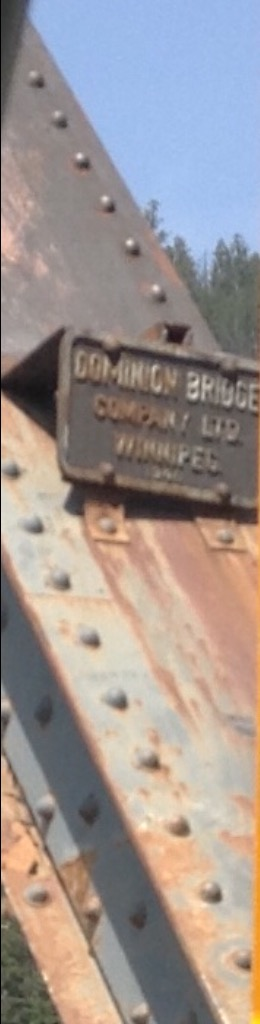
A plaque on Moberly Bridge over the Athabasca River near Jasper, Alberta, which the Dominion Bridge Company constructed

- South Saskatchewan River Bridge (1887)
- Windsor Station (Montreal) (1889)
- Jean-De La Lande Bridge, Salaberry-de-Valleyfield (1895)
- Aberdeen Pavilion, Ottawa (1898)
- Minto Bridges, Ottawa (1900)
- Alexandra Bridge, Ottawa (1901)
- Royal Tower, Winnipeg (1904)
- Cap-Rouge Railway Trestle (1908)
- Lumsden Building, Toronto (1910)
- Dominion Building, Vancouver (1910)
- Little Salmon River Railway Trestle (1911)
- Gauron Bridge (1912)
- Walterdale Bridge, Edmonton (1913)
- Bergen Cut-off Bridge, Winnipeg (1913)
- Hudson Bay Railway Bridge, Port Nelson, Manitoba (1914)
- Taylors Place Bridge, Del Bonita (1915)
- Prince Edward Viaduct, Toronto (1918)
- Chaudière Bridge, Ottawa (1919)
- Reversing Falls Railway Bridge, Saint John (1922)
- Whiskey Gap Bridge, Del Bonita (1923)
- Jacques Cartier Bridge, Montreal (1929)
- Cherry Street Strauss Trunnion Bascule Bridge, Toronto (1930)
- Guaranteed Pure Milk bottle, Montreal (1930)
- Marine Building, Vancouver (1930)
- Pont Sainte-Anne, Chicoutimi (1933)
- Honoré Mercier Bridge (1934)
- Île d'Orléans Bridge, Île d'Orléans (1935)
- Golden Gate Bridge (1937)
- Lions Gate Bridge, Vancouver (1938)
- The Fairmont Hotel Vancouver (1939)
- Moberly Bridge, Jasper (1940)
- Arvida Bridge (1950)
- Burnaby Refinery Atmospheric and Vacuum Distillation Columns, Burnaby (1954)
- Agassiz-Rosedale Bridge, Agassiz, British Columbia (1956)
- Electra Building, Vancouver (1957)
- Mayo River Bridge, Mayo, YT (1957)
- Ironworkers Memorial Second Narrows Crossing, Vancouver (1958)
- Quesnel River Bridge, Quesnel, BC (1961)
- Champlain Bridge (1962)
- Tour Telus, Montreal (1962)
- Port Mann Bridge, Coquitlam/Surrey (1964)
- Pont de la Concorde (1965)
- Expo 67 German Pavilion, Montreal (1967)
- Kelly's Creek Bridge (1967)
- Laviolette Bridge, Trois-Rivières (1967)
- Toronto Dominion Bank Tower, Toronto (1967)
- Royal Trust Tower, Toronto (1969)
- Pierre Laporte Bridge, Quebect/Levis (1970)
- Pont Turcotte, Sorel-Tracy/QUÉBEC (1932)
- Andrewsville Bridge, Rideau River and Canal
- Similkimeen Bridge, Princeton, BC (1980)
- Toronto Sky-Dome Roof Steel Trusses (1989)
