= Noire River (rivière aux Pommes) =

- Location within Quebec

Location
- Country: Canada
- Province: Quebec
- Region: Capitale-Nationale
- Regional County Municipality: La Jacques-Cartier
- Municipality: Saint-Augustin-de-Desmaures, Pont-Rouge et Neuville

Physical characteristics
- Source: Cachée Lake
  - location: Lac-Jacques-Cartier
  - coordinates: 46°46′48″N 71°33′36″W
  - elevation: 139
- Mouth: Jacques-Cartier River
  - location: Stoneham-et-Tewkesbury
  - coordinates: 46°41′53″N 71°40′12″W
  - elevation: 60 m
- Length: 16.6 km (10.3 mi)

Basin features
- Tributaries
  - left: Branche Parent

The rivière Noire (English: Black River) is a tributary of the rivière aux Pommes, flowing in the municipalities of Saint-Augustin-de-Desmaures, Pont-Rouge and Neuville, in the Portneuf Regional County Municipality, in the administrative region of Capitale-Nationale, in Quebec, Canada.

The Black River Valley is mainly served by route 365, route 367 and autoroute 40 which links the cities of Quebec and Trois-Rivières. Some secondary roads serve this area for agricultural purposes.

Apart from the hamlets crossed, agriculture is the main economic activity in the sector; forestry, second.

The surface of the Black River (except the rapids areas) is generally frozen from the beginning of December to the end of March; safe circulation on the ice is generally done from the end of December to the beginning of March. The water level of the river varies with the seasons and the precipitation; the spring flood occurs in March or April.

== Geography ==
The Black River has its source in Saint-Augustin-de-Desmaures at Étang Martel. This confluence is located 3.4 kilometres (2.1 mi) northwest of the railway, 4.2 kilometres (2.6 mi) northwest of autoroute 40, 10.7 kilometres (6.6 mi) northeast of downtown Pont-Rouge and 7.5 kilometres (4.7 mi) northwest of the north-west bank of St. Lawrence River.

From its source, the Black River flows over 16.6 kilometres (10.3 mi) with a drop of 79 metres (259 ft) according to the following segments:

- 6.4 kilometres (4.0 mi) towards the south-west, especially in the forest zone, passing near two hamlets, up to the railway;
- 6.6 kilometres (4.1 mi) towards the south by forming a hook towards the east, by cutting route 365 twice because of a loop towards the west, to autoroute 40;
- 3.6 kilometres (2.2 mi) south-east to its mouth.

The mouth of the Noire River flows into a bend in the rivière aux Pommes in Neuville.

From this confluence, the current descends the rivière aux Pommes for 7.0 kilometres (4.3 mi) towards the southwest by winding in agricultural area, to the east bank of the Jacques-Cartier River. From there, the current descends to the southeast over 3.6 kilometres (2.2 mi) following the course of the Jacques-Cartier River to the northwest shore of the Saint-Laurent river.

== Toponymy ==
The toponym "rivière Noire" was formalized on December 5, 1968 at the Commission de toponymie du Québec.

== See also ==
- Saint-Augustin-de-Desmaures
- Pont-Rouge
- Neuville
- Portneuf Regional County Municipality
- Rivière aux Pommes
- Jacques-Cartier River, a stream
- List of rivers of Quebec
