= Rivière aux Pommes =

Tributary of Jacques-Cartier River in Québec, Canada

- Location within Quebec

Location
- Country: Canada
- Province: Quebec
- Region: Capitale-Nationale
- Regional County Municipality: Portneuf Regional County Municipality
- Municipality: Sainte-Catherine-de-la-Jacques-Cartier, Pont-Rouge et Neuville

Physical characteristics
- Source: Little and unidentified lake
  - location: Sainte-Catherine-de-la-Jacques-Cartier
  - coordinates: 46°49′39″N 71°34′33″W
  - elevation: 139
- Mouth: Jacques-Cartier River
  - location: Donnacona
  - coordinates: 46°41′50″N 71°44′11″W
  - elevation: 50 m
- Length: 38 km (24 mi)

Basin features
- Tributaries
  - left: (Upward from the mouth) Noire River (rivière aux Pommes), cours d'eau du Village-de-la-Madeleine, ruisseau Sainte-Jeanne.
  - right: (Upward from the mouth) Décharge du Lac de Mes Rêves, ruisseau des Soeurs.

The rivière aux Pommes is a tributary of the Jacques-Cartier River, flowing in the municipalities of Sainte-Catherine-de-la-Jacques-Cartier, Pont-Rouge, Neuville and Donnacona, in the Portneuf Regional County Municipality, in the administrative region of Capitale-Nationale, in Quebec, Canada.

The Rivière aux Pommes valley is mainly served by the route 365, the route 367 and the autoroute 40 which links the cities of Quebec and Trois-Rivières. Some secondary roads serve this area for agricultural purposes.

Apart from hamlets or village areas, agriculture is the main economic activity in the sector; forestry, second.

The surface of the Rivière aux Pommes (except the rapids areas) is generally frozen from the beginning of December to the end of March; safe circulation on the ice is generally done from the end of December to the beginning of March. The water level of the river varies with the seasons and the precipitation; the spring flood occurs in March or April.

== Geography ==
The Rivière aux Pommes rises at Sainte-Catherine-de-la-Jacques-Cartier, from a small unidentified lake, at the foot of mont Bélair. This source is located 3.6 kilometres (2.2 mi) east of the village center of Sainte-Catherine-de-la-Jacques-Cartier, at 9.6 kilometres (6.0 mi) at northwest of autoroute 40, at 13.1 kilometres (8.1 mi) northwest of St. Lawrence River, at 19 kilometres (12 mi) north-west of its mouth.

It then flows for a distance of 36.1 kilometres (22.4 mi) The Rivière aux Pommes has a drop of 89 metres (292 ft), according to the following segments:

- 3.3 kilometres (2.1 mi) towards the south-east by forming a large curve in agricultural area towards the north, to end this segment by crossing an artificial lake to the dam located on the edge of route 367;
- 5.1 kilometres (3.2 mi) to the south in an agricultural zone by crossing a golf course, by collecting the discharge (coming from the west) from a small unidentified lake, by collecting a second discharge from small lakes unidentified, passing from the east side of a hamlet to route 358;
- 4.5 kilometres (2.8 mi) to the south in an agricultural zone passing through the small hamlet around Lake Saint-Denis in Pont-Rouge, up to the Josaphat-Martel road;
- 2.9 kilometres (1.8 mi) (or 1.8 km in a straight line) south by bending to the southwest and winding heavily in agricultural and forestry areas, up to Route Guénard;
- 3.3 kilometres (2.1 mi) to the west while winding heavily in agricultural area up to the railway;
- 3.4 kilometres (2.1 mi) to the southwest passing east of the village of Pont-Rouge, then south to the route de la Pinière (route 365);
- 5.7 kilometres (3.5 mi) south-east, up to the two bridges of autoroute 40;
- 7.9 kilometres (4.9 mi) towards the west by first forming a curve to the south of the highway where it collects the waters of the Noire River (coming from the east), then westwards, winding greatly at the end of the segment, to its mouth.

The confluence of the Rivière aux Pommes and the Jacques-Cartier River is located four kilometers north of Donnacona. From this confluence, the current descends to the southeast over 3.6 kilometres (2.2 mi) following the course of the Jacques-Cartier River.

According to the report of the CBJC (on page 51), the flood zones of the Rivière aux Pommes, are located in the city of Neuville (at the intersection of the Félix-Leclerc highway (north (2e Rang), and north of rue de la Rivière) and in the town of Pont-Rouge (north of rang Petit-Capsa, from rue des Hirondelles to route Joséphat-Martel).

in an easterly direction until its mouth in the Jacques-Cartier River, four kilometers north of Donnacona. From this confluence, the current descends to the southeast over 3.6 kilometres (2.2 mi) following the course of the Jacques-Cartier River.

The watershed covers an area of 107 square kilometres (41 sq mi).

== Toponymy ==
The name of the "Rivière aux Pommes" dates from the French Regime. He could allude to the cenelle, the fruit of the hawthorn, which abounds in the area.

The toponym "Rivière aux Pommes" was formalized on December 5, 1968 at the Commission de toponymie du Québec.

== See also ==
- Sainte-Catherine-de-la-Jacques-Cartier
- Pont-Rouge
- Neuville
- Donnacona
- Portneuf Regional County Municipality
- Noire River
- Jacques-Cartier River
- List of rivers of Quebec

== Bibliography ==
- Jacques-Cartier Basin Corporation (2013). Plan directeur de l'eau de la zone de gestion intégrée de l'eau de la Jacques-Cartier (Water Master Plan for the Jacques-Cartier Integrated Water Management Zone) (PDF). p. 391.
