= Cap-Rouge, Quebec City =

Neighbourhood in Quebec City, Canada

Coordinates: 46°45′N 71°21′W

Cap-Rouge in Quebec City

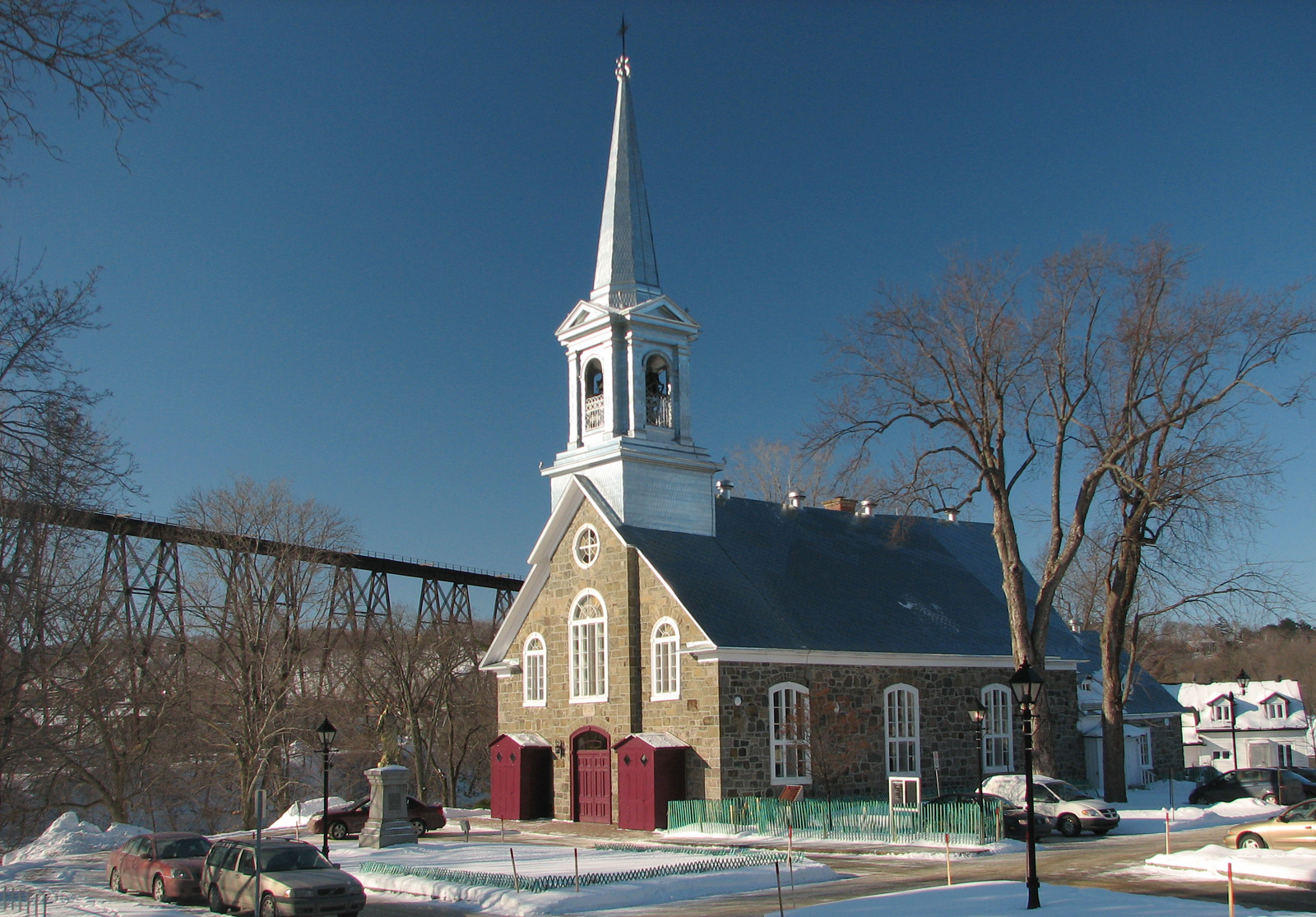
Old Village's Church

Cap-Rouge (French pronunciation: [kap ʁuʒ]) is a former city in central Quebec, Canada, since 2002 within the borough Sainte-Foy–Sillery–Cap-Rouge in Quebec City. The site of the first attempted permanent French settlement in North America, Charlesbourg-Royal, is located at the confluence of the Rivière du Cap Rouge and the Saint Lawrence River. Its population was 13,153 as of the Canada 2011 Census.

== First permanent establishments ==
In 1635, the first seigneurie was granted on the territory of Cape-Rouge, but revoked the following year by the Company of One Hundred Associates. However, by 1638 Paul Le Jeune, a missionary Jesuit, had noted in The Jesuit Relations the presence of some families in the valley. Between 1647 and 1652, the seigneuries of Maur, on the west, and Gaudarville, in the east, were established on the territory. From that moment, based on taxable citizens, the settlement on the lands of Cap-Rouge are established. The village formed is served by the parishes of Ancienne-Lorette in (1678) to the north; of Saint-Augustin in (1691) on the west; and of Sainte-Foy (1698) in the east. (Note: Banque de noms de lieux du Québec, entrée Cap-Rouge p.3)

== Geography ==
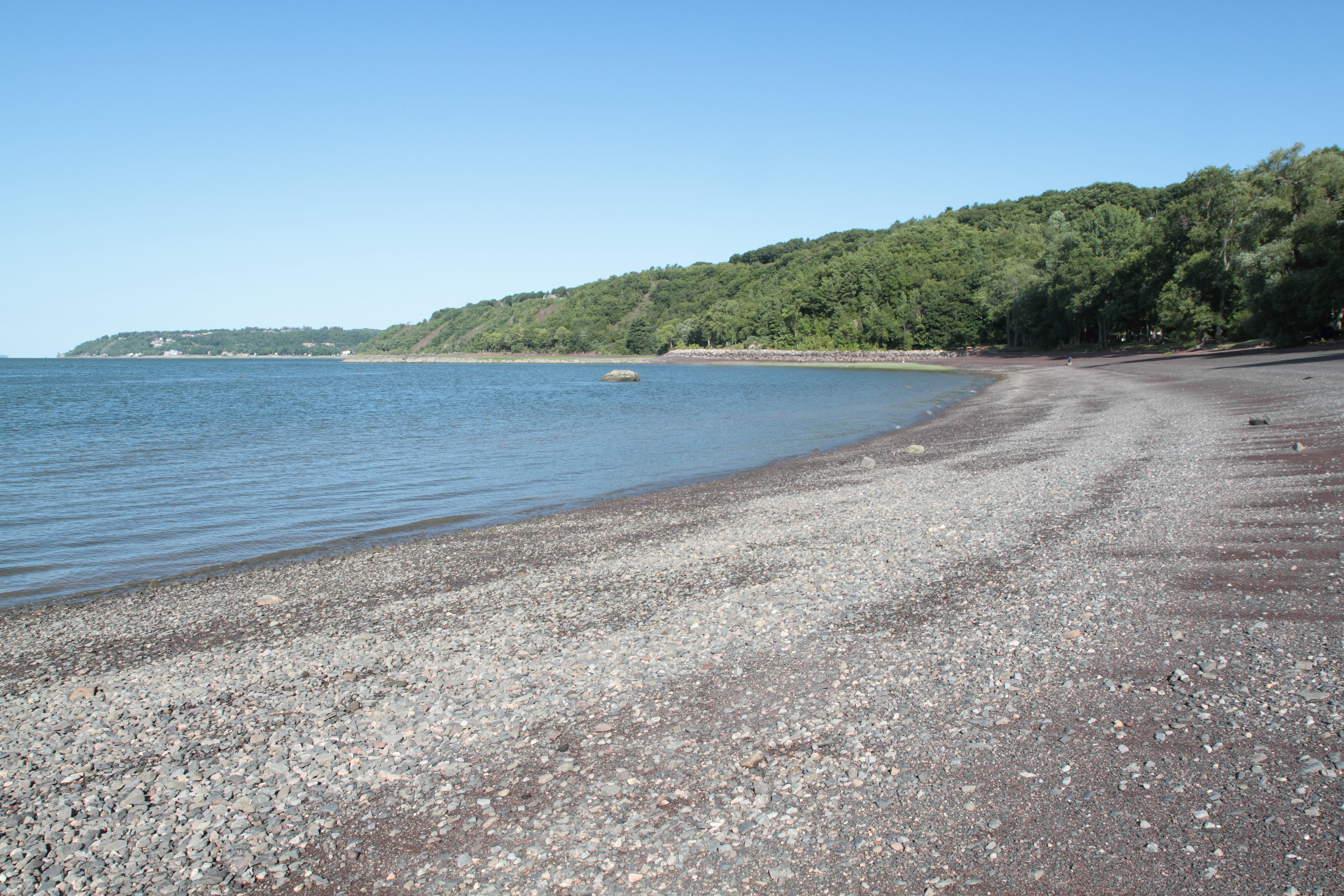
The beach of Plage Jacques Cartier and the cliffs of Cap-Rouge

The name of Cap-Rouge, meaning "red cape", comes from its cliffs facing the Saint-Lawrence river and made of schist rock bearing a reddish tint. The other main topographic feature of Cap-Rouge is the Rivière du Cap Rouge valley where are concentrated some historic buildings as well the archeological remains of a pottery workshop active from 1860 to 1892. It is believed that until the end of its operations the workshop mainly used imported clay rather than the local one, which has a rather red hue.

The Cap-Rouge area is located to the south of the Canadian Shield and Laurentian Mountains, at the confluence of the geological regions of the Saint Lawrence Lowlands and of the northern Appalachians. It mostly sits at the western foot of the Quebec promontory, in the way of the Logan's Line - an inactive fracture in the Earth's crust first documented by William Edmond Logan.

== Attractions ==
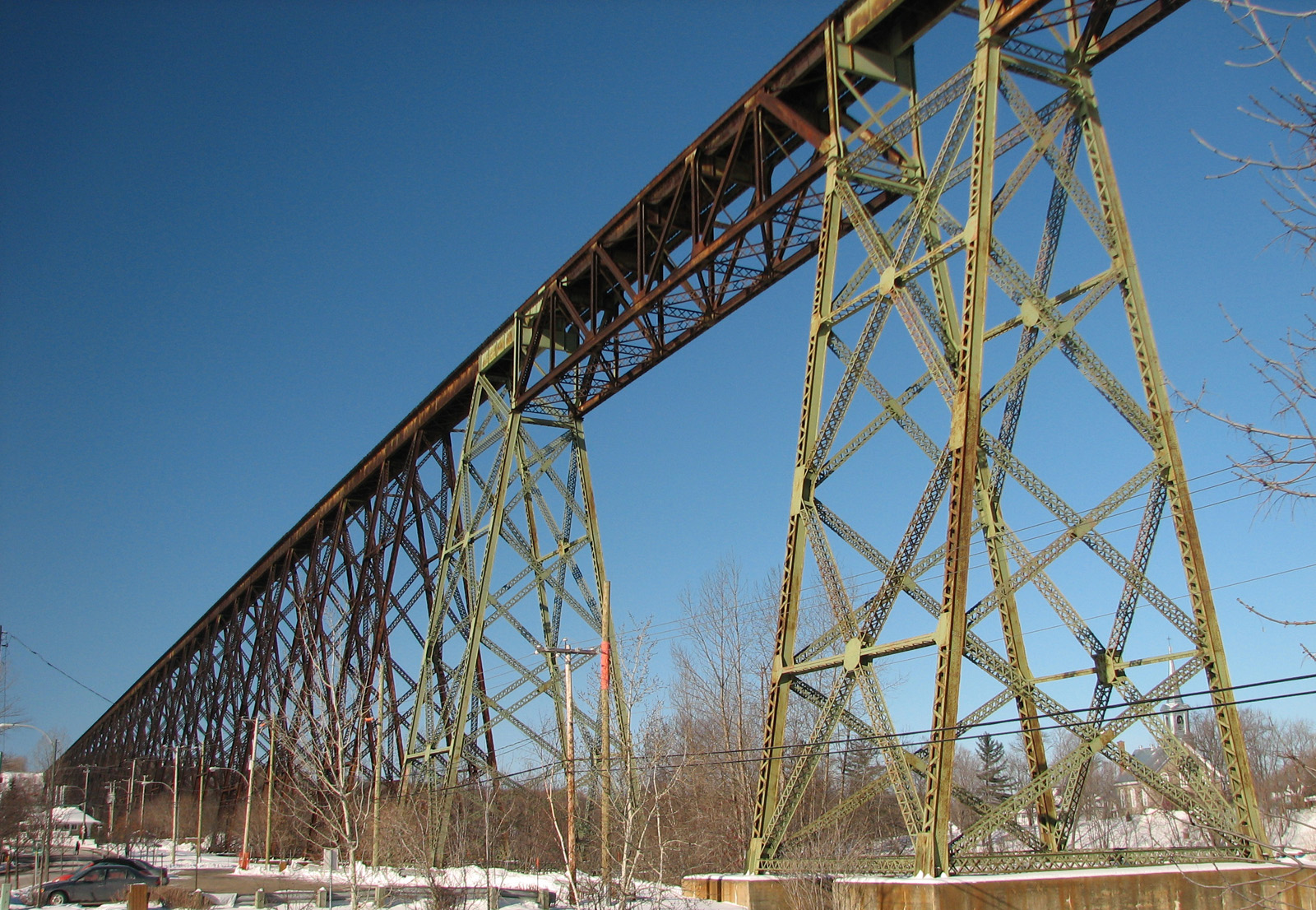
The railway trestle

In addition to its long history, the main attraction of Cap-Rouge is the towering Cap-Rouge trestle (French: Tracel) rail-road bridge. Built in 1907-1908, the steel trestle was constructed under the authority of the National Transcontinental as part of the National Transcontinental Railway. It spans 3,335 feet at an average of 172 feet above ground and is still in use today.

== Notable people ==
- Laurent Torregrossa (born in 1964), painter
- Marie Philippe, singer
- Jonathan Marchessault, NHL player, Conn Smythe trophy winner

== See also ==
- Charlesbourg-Royal
- History of French colonization of the Americas
- List of former cities in Quebec
