= New Denmark, New Brunswick =

New Denmark
- Community
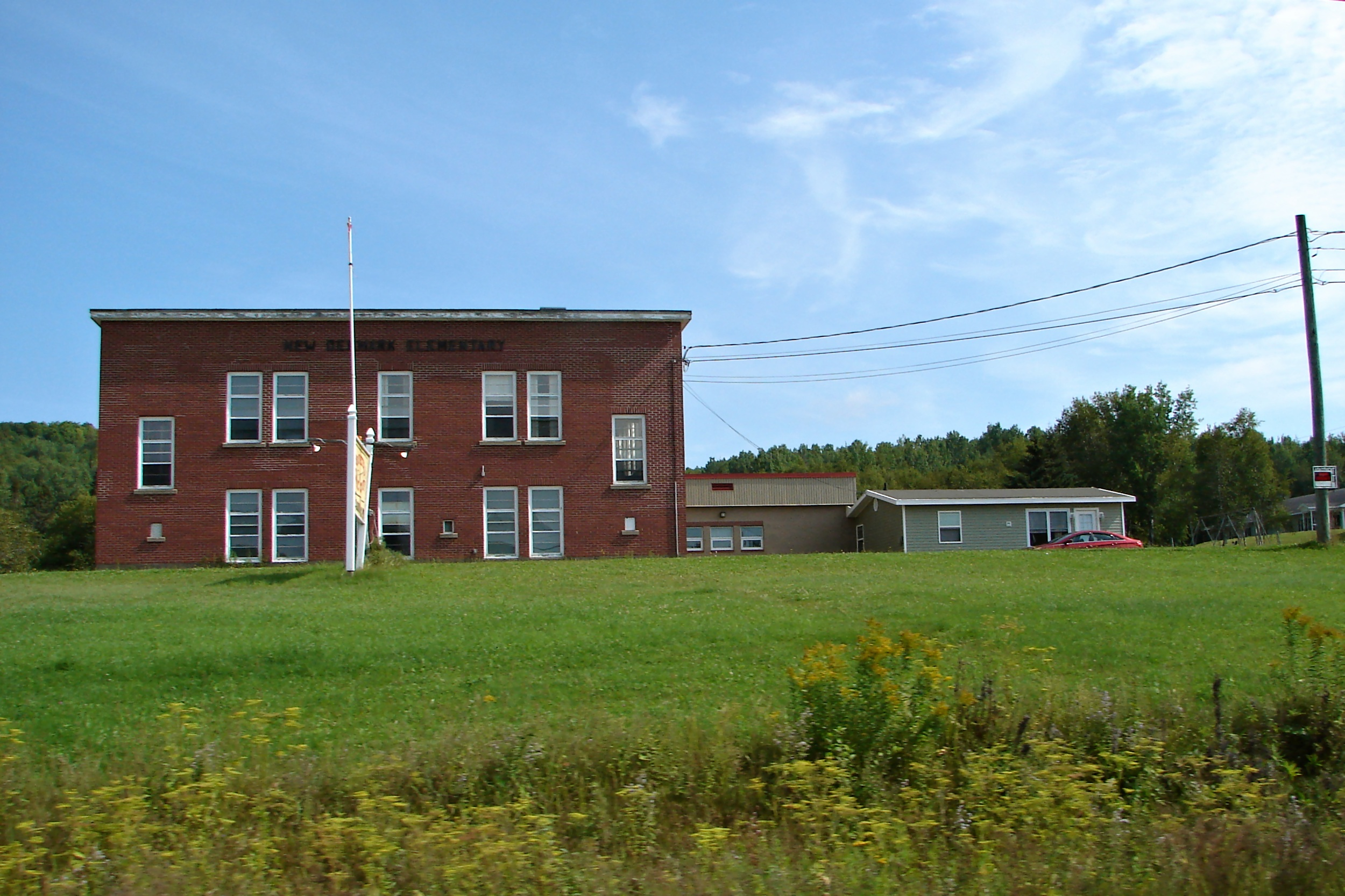

- Location within New Brunswick
- Coordinates: 47°02′04″N 67°44′22″W
- Country: Canada
- Province: New Brunswick
- County: Victoria County
- Settled: 1872
- Incorporated: June 19, 1872

Government
  - MLA: Andrew Harvey (L)
  - MP: Richard Bragdon (C)

Population (2006)
  - Total: 1,668
- Demonym: Danish or Dane(s)
- Time zone: UTC−4 (Atlantic (AST))
  - Summer (DST): UTC−3 (ADT)
- Area code: 506

New Denmark is a rural community in Victoria County, New Brunswick, Canada. The community is situated in rolling hills east of the Saint John River valley several kilometres south of Drummond. Its main industry is potato farming and related industries. Once the site of several schools, they have all closed and students in New Denmark can choose to continue school in nearby Grand Falls or Tobique Valley.

The community hosts Lutheran, Anglican, Roman Catholic, and Pentecostal churches. Its five major ancestries are: English (50.1%), French (36.4%), Danish (17.0%), Scottish (12.4%), Irish (11.9%). The population has remained at approximately 1,000 residents in recent history, with Denmark Parish reporting a population of 1,668 in 2006.

== History ==
The community of Hellerup originally derived its name from Captain Sorensen S. Heller with several Danish settlers who sailed from Copenhagen to Halifax aboard the steam ship Caspian, then on to the city of Saint John aboard the Empress. Then they paddle-wheeled up the St. John River and the Salmon River to arrive at the gravel bank on the opposite, inhabitable side of Drummond. This concurred with the redrafting of the Free Grants Act and redistribution of land parcels away from the original agreement set in the 1872 Stymest Heller proposal. Eventually this settlement formed the largest and what would become the oldest Danish community in Canada, but in recent decades the Danish influence has diminished due to anglicization.

In 1912, the National Transcontinental Railway constructed the massive Little Salmon River Trestle a large steel trestle across the Little Salmon River valley. Today, this bridge remains the second largest railway bridge in Canada and an important structure on the Montreal-Halifax mainline of the Canadian National Railway.

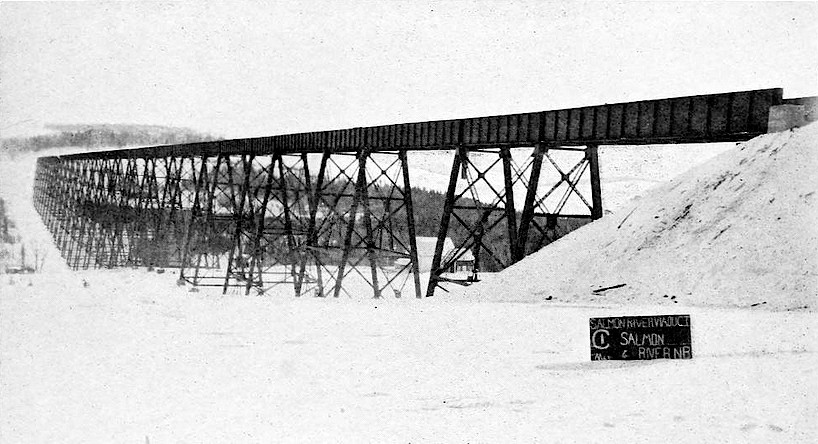
Little Salmon River Trestle, New Denmark, New Brunswick. Mile 184 from Moncton

Post office changed from Salmonhurst in 1962.

== Trivia ==
- On June 19 of every year, the community gathers on the historical grounds of the community to celebrate Founders Day. Through song, dance, prayer, and pure reminiscing, it is a very important day in New Denmark. Many Danish treats such as Æbleskiver and Pølse are also served on this day of celebration.
- Of the original families to come immigrate in 1872, the descendants of one of them (Anders and Marie Carlsen) are especially numerous, but there are also many other families from subsequent immigrations in the late 19th and early 20th centuries. Today the community is more mixed, but the Danish language can still be heard, and many families with French or English surnames, still proudly proclaim their Danish roots.
- During the summer of 2006, the site of the building in which the original settlers spent their first winter (the "Immigrant House") was declared a Provincial Historical Site by the government of New Brunswick. A plaque was placed at this site, near the New Denmark Museum which stands there today.
- During the summer of 2007, the community celebrated its 135th anniversary by holding a queen's pageant, a re-enactment of the founding of the community, by holding a parade and by holding many other planned activities.
- New Denmark and its early inhabitants have been the subject of much research. One of the more recent studies was performed by Erik Lang (originally from Perth-Andover), who donated 2 copies of his M.A. (Carleton University) thesis New Denmark, New Brunswick: New approaches in the study of Danish migration to Canada, 1872-1901, to the New Denmark Museum in 2005. Copies of the thesis can also be found in the public libraries of Perth-Andover, Grand Falls, and Fredericton, at the Archives of the Harriet Irving Library on the University of New Brunswick Fredericton campus, at the Provincial Archives of New Brunswick, at the Maxwell MacOdrum Library on the Carleton University Campus, and at the Library and Archives Canada in Ottawa.
- The fourth season of CBC's Still Standing includes an episode on New Denmark.

== See also ==
- List of communities in New Brunswick
- Solvang, California
