= Cap-Rouge trestle =

Cap-Rouge viaduct Tracel de Cap-Rouge
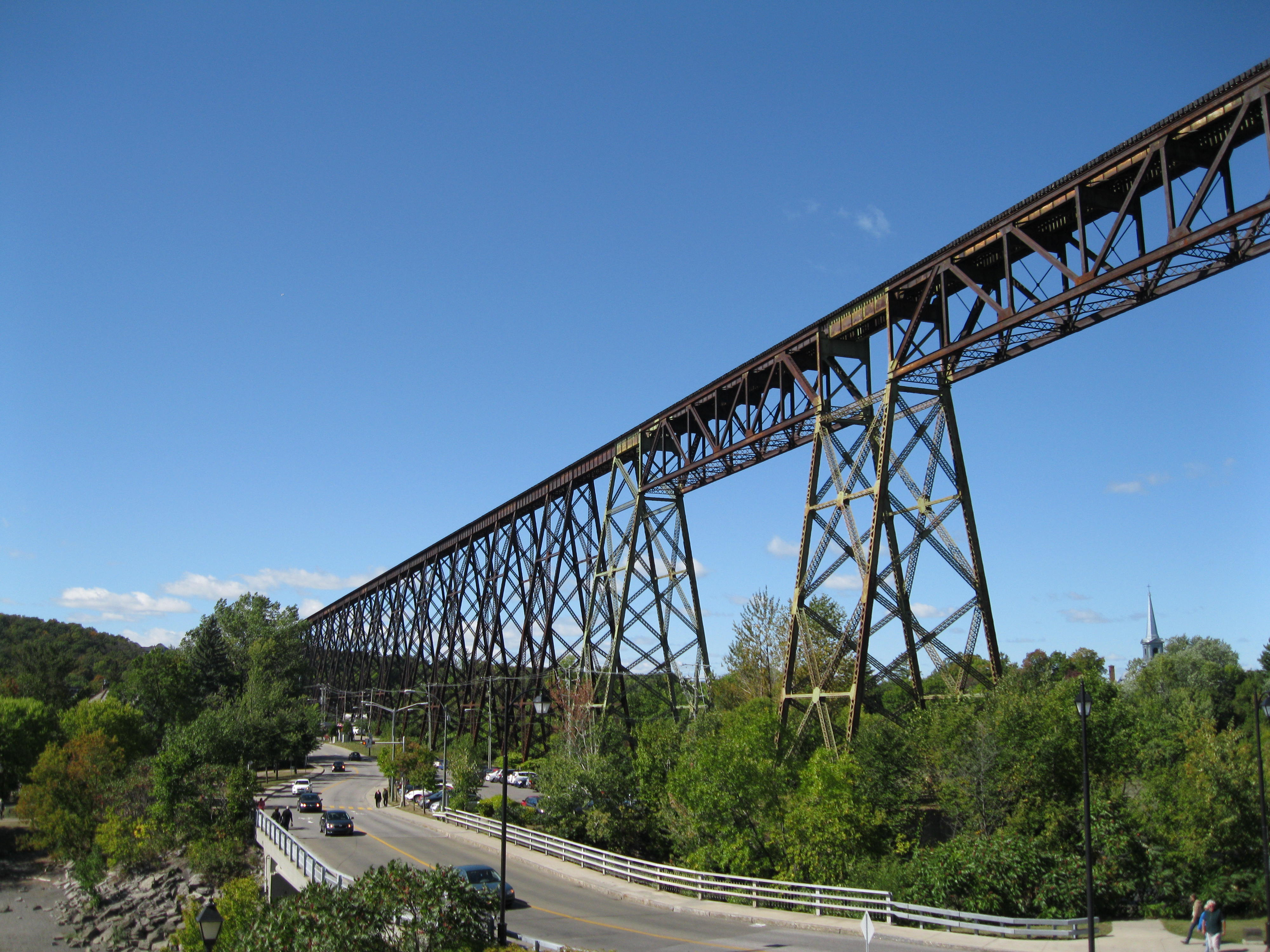
- Coordinates: 46.7488°N 71.3485°W
- Carries: Rail
- Crosses: Rivière du Cap Rouge
- Locale: Quebec City, Quebec, Canada
- Owner: Canadian National Railway

Characteristics
- Total length: 1,016 m (3,333 ft)
- Width: 52 m (171 ft)
- Height: 173 ft (53 m)

History
- Engineering design by: R.F. Uniacke, M.J. Butler, E.A. Hoare, A.E. Doucet
- Inaugurated: 1908

The Cap-Rouge trestle (French: Tracel de Cap-Rouge) is a railway trestle bridge inaugurated in 1908 and still in use in the community of Cap-Rouge, part of the borough of Sainte-Foy–Sillery–Cap-Rouge in Quebec City, Quebec, Canada. It was commissioned in 1906 as a section of the National Transcontinental Railway to span the Rivière du Cap Rouge valley and connect the eastbound railway with the newly built and nearby Quebec Bridge. It was built as a steel structure by the Dominion Bridge Company at a total cost of 800 000 Canadian dollars.

At 173 feet (53 m), it is one of the highest structures on which trains are operated in the province of Quebec and as such, has become over the years an attractive location for trespassers. As a response, its points of access have been fenced and a video surveillance system installed. As of October 2018, it is only used by freight trains, at the relatively slow speed of approximately 12 miles per hour (19 km/h).
