= Pelletier, Quebec =

Pelletier
- Interactive map of Pelletier
- Coordinates: 47.5480761°N 69.4189318°W
- Country: Canada
- Province: Quebec
- Region: Bas-Saint-Laurent
- Regional county municipality: Témiscouata
- Town: Pohénégamook
- Time zone: UTC−5 (EST)
  - Summer (DST): UTC−4 (EDT)
- Area codes: 418 and 581

Pelletier, formerly known as Pelletier-Station, is a community in the town of Pohénégamook, Quebec, Canada. Pelletier's railway station was served by the National Transcontinental Railway, which became part of the Canadian National Railway.
