= Pont-Rouge, Quebec (village municipality) =

District in Canada

The village municipality of Pont-Rouge (French pronunciation: [pɔ̃ ʁuʒ], lit. 'Red Bridge') is a former village now part of the current City of Pont-Rouge, Quebec, Canada.

Prior to January 3, 1996, the village of Pont-Rouge was an independent municipality; on that date, it and the municipality of Sainte-Jeanne-de-Pont-Rouge were merged into the new City of Pont-Rouge.

== History ==
The sector was originally part of the parish of Sainte-Jeanne-de-Neuville. In 1911, the sector became an independent municipality under the same name of Sainte-Jeanne-de-Neuville. In 1918, the village municipality changed its name to Pont-Rouge. In 1996, the village was merged with the parish (then known as Sainte-Jeanne-de-Pont-Rouge) to create the current City of Pont-Rouge.

== Demographics ==
Historical census populations – Pont-Rouge Village (1911–1996)

Year	Pop.	±%
1921	1,419	—
1931	1,353	−4.7%
1941	1,865	+37.8%
1951	2,413	+29.4%
1956	2,631	+9.0%
1961	2,988	+13.6%
1966	3,229	+8.1%

Year	Pop.	±%
1971	3,272	+1.3%
1976	3,342	+2.1%
1981	3,580	+7.1%
1986	3,694	+3.2%
1991	4,133	+11.9%
1996	4,676	+13.1%

Source: Statistics Canada
