= Job Abbott =

American-Canadian civil engineer (1845–1896)

- Born: August 23, 1845; Andover, Massachusetts, US
- Died: August 18, 1896 (aged 50); Andover, Massachusetts, US
- Citizenship: United States
- Education: Phillips Academy; Harvard University
- Engineering career
- Employer: Dominion Bridge Company Limited

Job Abbott (August 23, 1845 – August 18, 1896) was an American-born Canadian civil engineer who helped pioneer the construction of steel bridges in Canada, including many for the Canadian Pacific Railway, such as the 3,400-foot (1,000 m) Lachine Bridge in Montreal.

== Early life ==
Abbott was born in Andover, Massachusetts, on August 23, 1845. His father was a farmer named Nathan Abbott, and his mother was Elizabeth Noyes. He went to high school at Phillips Academy and graduated from Lawrence Scientific School at Harvard University in 1864.

== Early career ==
Abbott started his career working for the Manchester Locomotive Works before becoming an assistant engineer with the Long Island Rail Road at the Glen Cove branch. He then joined the Pittsburgh, Fort Wayne and Chicago Railroad as an assistant engineer, provided a layout for the town of Canton, Ohio, and became a civil and mining engineer. He also became a lawyer, joining the Ohio bar and specializing in patent law.

In 1872, he became vice-president and chief engineer of Wrought Iron Bridge Company, a company that specialized in prefabricated bridges. In 1879, Canada introduced the National Policy which applied a 25 percent tariff on imported fabricated steelwork and ironwork. With the support of the Wrought Iron Bridge Company, Canadian engineers created a new Canadian enterprise called Toronto Bridge Company, and Abbott became a minor shareholder and consultant. Toronto Bridge Company struggled to be profitable in its first year of operations, so Abbott was appointed as president and chief engineer. As president, company sales improved but were limited by having their headquarters in Toronto.

== Dominion Bridge ==
Abbott and his colleagues seized control of Toronto Bridge Company and formed a new company in Montreal on September 23, 1882, called the Dominion Bridge Company Limited. The company focused on manufacturing iron and steel, and building bridges throughout Canada, particularly railroad bridges for the Canadian Pacific Railway. Abbott was its president and chief engineer, and also a salesman for the company.

Abbott designed the first through cantilever bridge in North America for Reversing Falls in Saint John, New Brunswick. Abbott also designed the Lachine Bridge in Montreal and the Grand Narrows Bridge on Cape Breton Island.

In October 1887 Abbott took a temporary leave from the company for health reasons, but returned in March 1888. He left the company permanently in June due to his health.

== Return to the United States, death and legacy ==
Abbott moved to New York City in 1889 and continued as a director of the Wrought Iron Bridge Company. In 1889 he began working for the New York Rapid Transit Railway, and the following year he resigned as president of Dominion Bridge, but remained as a consultant to the company. He became the chief engineer for NY Rapid Transit and a consultant with other American railway companies.

While working in Maine, Abbott's health declined again but he remained in the state for an additional year. He traveled back to Andover, and died there on August 18, 1896.

In 1891, he was elected as a member of the American Society of Civil Engineers.
