= Charlesbourg-Royal =

Fort Charlesbourg Royal
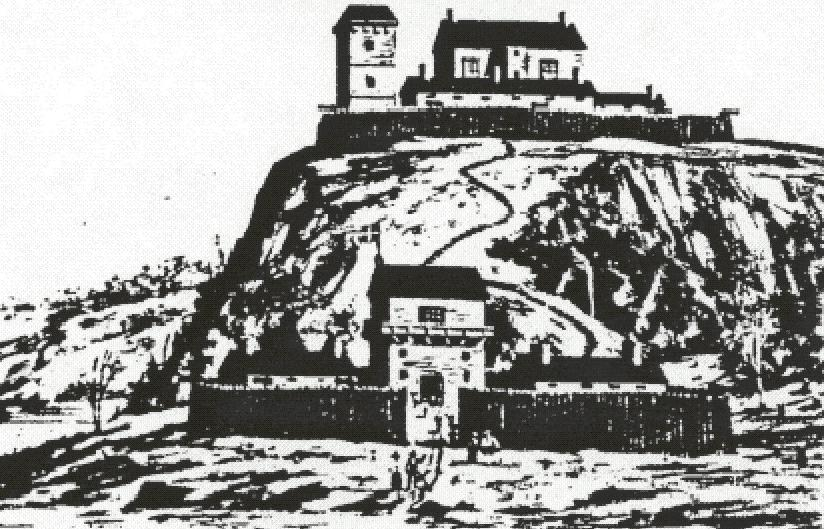
- Drawing of Charlesbourg Royal (1990)

- Fort Charlesbourg Royal Charlesbourg-Royal (Quebec City) Charlesbourg-Royal (Canada)
- 46°44′51.4″N 71°20′27.08″W
- Etymology: Named after Charles II, Duke of Orleans
- Location: Quebec City, Quebec, Canada

History
- Built: Summer 1541
- Abandoned: September 1543

Site notes
- Area: 1 hectare (2.5 acres)
- Governing body: Parks Canada
- Website: www.pc.gc.ca/apps/dfhd/page_nhs_eng.aspx?id=597

National Historic Site of Canada
- Official name: Fort Charlesbourg Royal
- Designated: 1923-05-25
- Reference no.: 16661

Fort Charlesbourg Royal (1541–1543) is a National Historic Site in the Cap-Rouge neighbourhood of Quebec City, Quebec, Canada. Established by Jacques Cartier in 1541, it was France's first attempt at a colony in North America, and was abandoned two years later. In 1608, France would establish a successful colony, the Habitation de Québec, 15 kilometers east of the Cap-Rouge fort.

== History ==
In the summer of 1541, after arriving on his third and final voyage, French explorer Jacques Cartier established the fort and a settlement of 400 people. It consisted of an upper fort, and lower fort located near the confluence of Rivière du Cap Rouge at the north shore of the Saint Lawrence River. The upper fort, at an elevation of 40 metres (130 ft), offered a strategic defensive position, while the lower fort provided a potential anchorage for ships. The two forts had three towers. Charlesbourg Royal was named after Charles II, Duke of Orleans, third son of King Francis I of France.

During the first winter, 35 of Cartier's men perished. Fort Charlesbourg Royal was abandoned in September 1543 due to the harsh weather, scurvy, and attacks from neighbouring Iroquoians of Stadacona and other villages.

In August 2006, Quebec Premier Jean Charest and Canadian archaeologists under Yves Chretien announced the discovery of the long-lost settlement. Chretien identified its location from fragments of a decorated c.1540-1550 Italian style ceramic plate and six wood timber samples dated to the mid-16th century by a United States laboratory.
