= Little Salmon River Trestle =

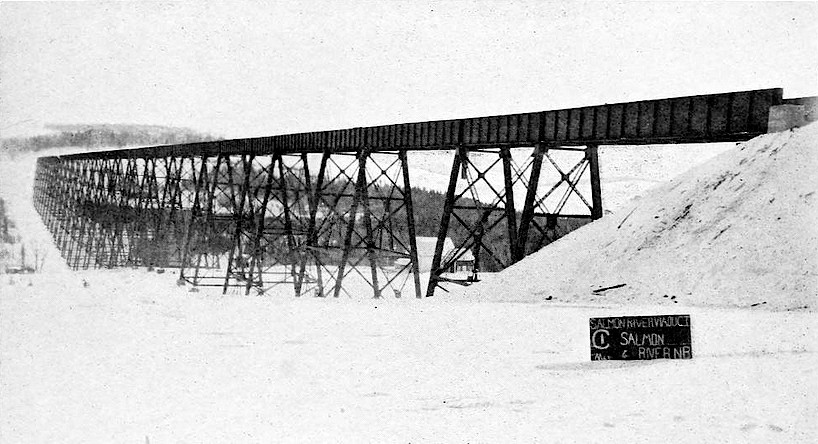
- Little Salmon River Viaduct, New Denmark, New Brunswick
- Coordinates: 47°01′39″N 67°36′13″W
- Carries: Rail
- Crosses: Little Salmon River, New Brunswick
- Locale: New Denmark, New Brunswick, Canada
- Other name: Salmon River Trestle
- Owner: Canadian National Railway

Characteristics
- Material: Steel
- Total length: 1,194 m (3,918 ft)
- Height: 60 m (198 ft)
- No. of spans: 49

History
- Designer: R.F. Uniacke, W. A. Duff,
- Engineering design by: F. P. Shearwood, Dominion Bridge Company
- Constructed by: Dominion Bridge Company
- Construction start: July 27, 1910
- Construction end: August 19, 1911
- Construction cost: $678,623

Location
- Interactive map of Little Salmon River Trestle

The Little Salmon River trestle is a railway trestle bridge completed in 1911 and still in use in the community of New Denmark, near Grand Falls, New Brunswick, Canada. It is the second largest railway bridge in Canada and the largest railway structure in New Brunswick.

The bridge was commissioned in 1906 as a section of the National Transcontinental Railway to span the wide valley of the Little Salmon River, a tributary of the Saint John River. Although the Little Salmon River is relatively small, it follows a deep and wide valley carved by glaciers. Aiming to avoid the steep grades required to descend and cross the river, the National Transcontinental instead designed a long viaduct to cross the entire valley. It was built by the Dominion Bridge Company using 6,346.35 tonnes (13,991,310 lb) of steel for a total cost of $678,623. Construction began on July 27, 1910 using a travelling crane system, prefabricated components and a work crew of 60 to 80 men. The last span was installed on February 9, 1911. Final riveting and painting were completed to open the bridge on August 19, 1911. Despite construction taking place at great heights in all seasons, the work was completed without any accidents or injuries. The bridge's great length made it the second largest in Canada after the Lethbridge Viaduct in Alberta. The National Transcontinental Railway ran into financial difficulties soon after completion, in part due to high construction costs. The line and the bridge was taken over by the Canadian Government Railways in 1915 which became the Canadian National Railway in 1918. The bridge formed a vital direct line between the Port of Halifax and central Canada, and became especially important to move large volumes of freight in the First and Second World Wars. The bridge also carried passenger traffic until January 14, 1990, when local Via Rail service ended. Today it is part of Canadian National's Napadogan Subdivision (Mile 172.5) and continues to carry a heavy volume of freight for Canadian National's mainline between Halifax and Montreal seeing ten freight trains a day.

== Specifications ==
- Length: 1,194.397 m (3,918 ft 7 1/2 in)
- Height: 60 m (198 ft) above river bed
- Materials: 11,200 tonnes (12,400 short tons) of steel
- Deck spans and lengths:
  - 24 plate girder spans each of 17.91 m (58 ft 9 in)
  - 25 plate girder spans each of 30.56 m (100 ft 3 in)
- Steel towers: total of 24
