= Pont-Rouge =

- City
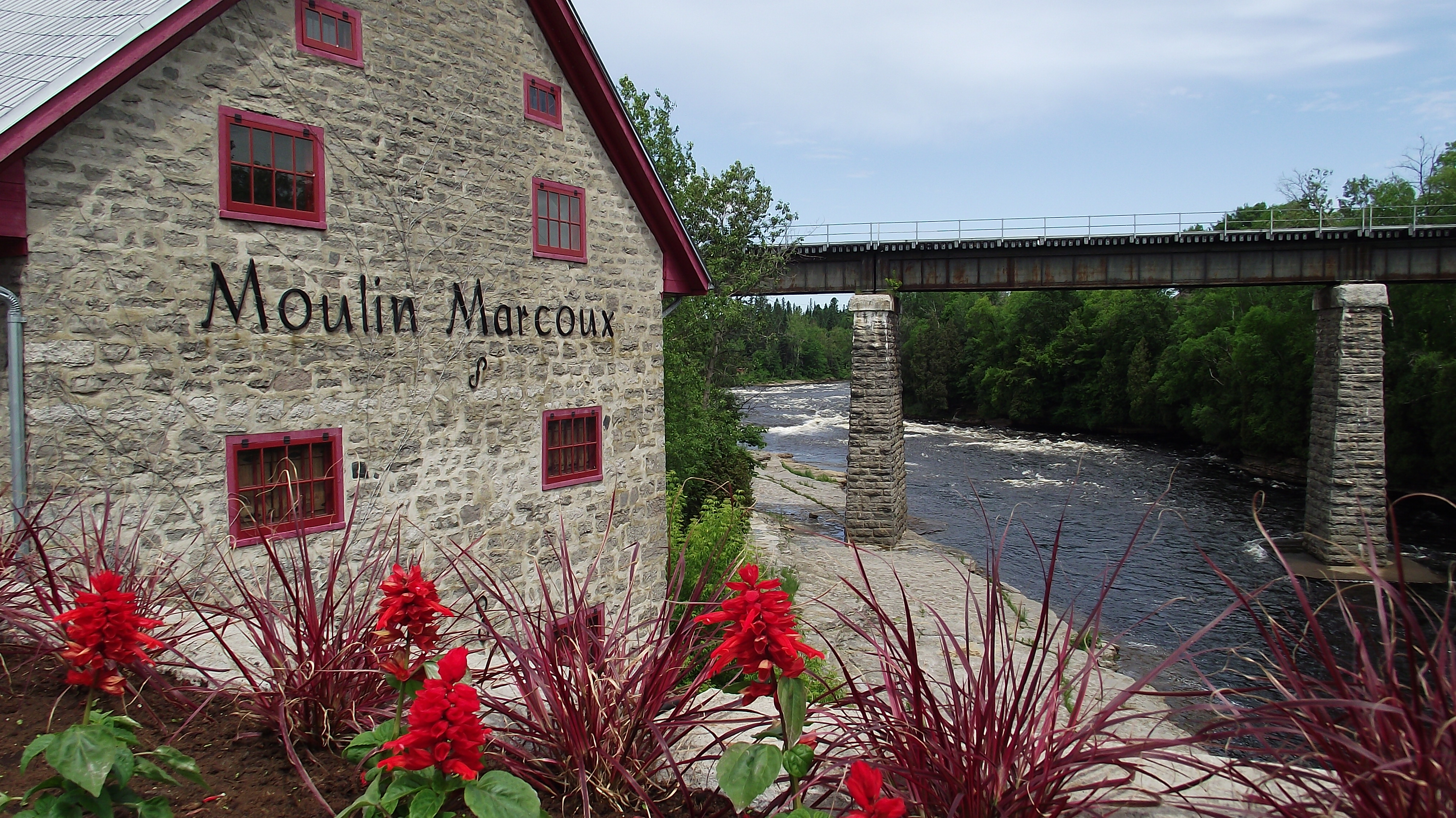
- Moulin Marcoux

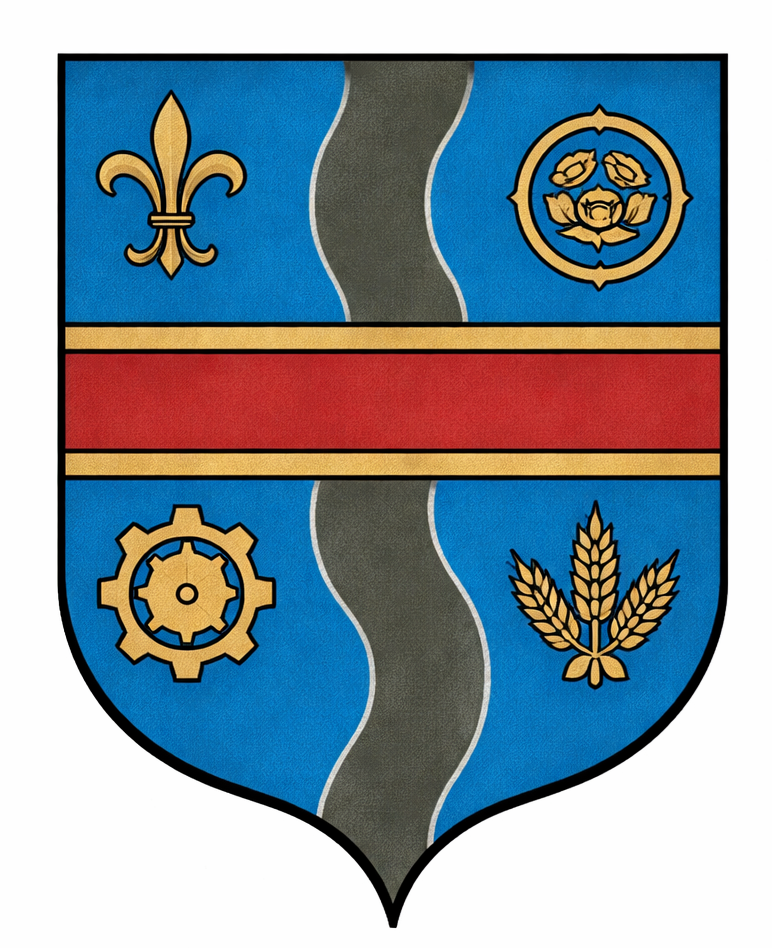
- Coat of arms

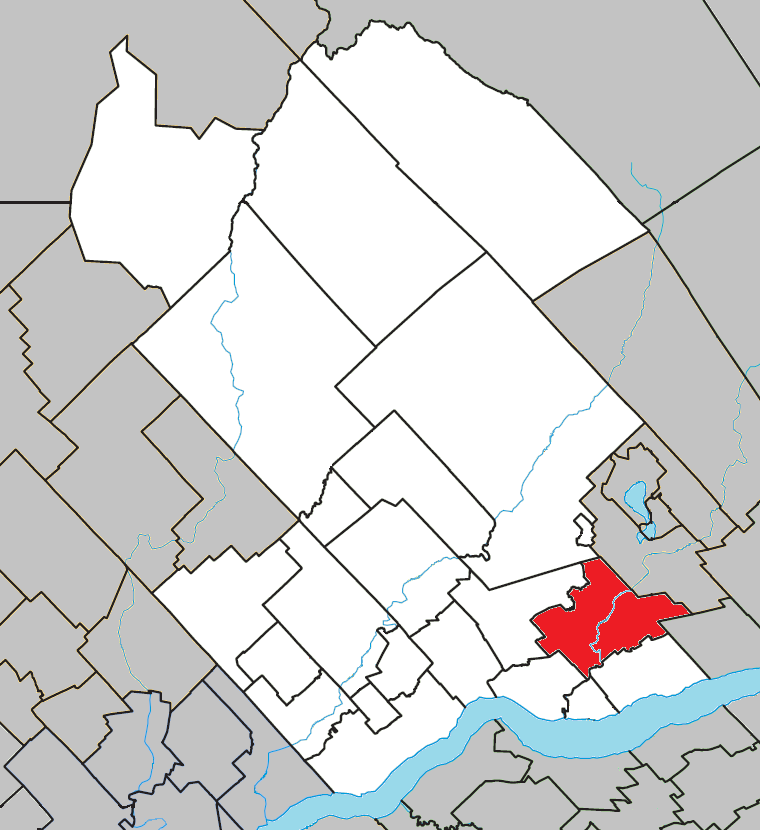
- Location within Portneuf RCM

- Location in central Quebec
- Coordinates: 46°45′N 71°42′W
- Country: Canada
- Province: Quebec
- Region: Capitale-Nationale
- RCM: Portneuf
- Settled: ca. 1740
- Constituted: January 3, 1996

Government
  - Mayor: Mario Dupont
  - Fed. riding: Saint-Augustin—Portneuf—Jacques-Cartier
  - Prov. riding: Portneuf

Area
  - City: 123.67 km^{2} (47.75 sq mi)
  - Land: 121.12 km^{2} (46.76 sq mi)
  - Urban: 6.67 km^{2} (2.58 sq mi)

Population (2021)
  - City: 10,121
  - Density: 83.6/km^{2} (217/sq mi)
  - Urban: 6,579
  - Urban density: 986.3/km^{2} (2,555/sq mi)
  - Pop (2016-21): ▲9.5%
  - Dwellings: 4,344
- Time zone: UTC−5 (EST)
  - Summer (DST): UTC−4 (EDT)
- Postal code(s): G3H
- Area codes: 418 and 581
- Highways: R-358 R-365
- Website: www.ville.pontrouge.qc.ca

Pont-Rouge (French pronunciation: [pɔ̃ ʁuʒ], lit. 'Red Bridge') is a Canadian city along the Jacques-Cartier River in southern Quebec, Canada. In the 2021 Canadian census the population was 10,121 inhabitants.

Transportation had considerable influence on the development of the parish, mainly the two bridges and the construction of the Canadian Pacific Railway bridge in 1874. The Royal Bridge (now called Pont Déry), was reconstructed several times because of the weakness of the centre of the bridge. This bridge served its purpose for the transportation of heavy loads and mail between Quebec and Montreal. The bridge was a toll bridge, and the money served the construction of a second bridge le pont Rouge, which was free. It united the western part to the eastern part of Dupont Street, named in honour of Father Charles-François Dupont, who was priest there from 1917 to 1933. A newer bridge has now replaced this bridge as of 2009.

== History ==
The first settlers arrived around 1740, but real efforts to colonize the area came around 1769. In 1804, the Royal Bridge (now called Pont Déry) was built over the Jacques-Cartier River, and was Quebec's first toll bridge. In order to avoid paying toll, another bridge was built by locals in 1822, which was painted red in 1838.

On April 15, 1867, the archbishop of Quebec, Charles-François Baillargeon, founded the Parish of Sainte-Jeanne-de-Neuville from portions of Cap-Santé, Saint-Basile, and Neuville. A year later, the Parish Municipality of Sainte-Jeanne-de-Neuville was established (which was renamed to Sainte-Jeanne-de-Pont-Rouge in 1957), and its post office opened. In 1911, the village separated from the parish municipality to become the Village Municipality of Sainte-Jeanne de Neuville (which was renamed to Pont-Rouge in 1918).

The new City of Pont-Rouge was established when the Parish Municipality of Sainte-Jeanne-de-Pont-Rouge and the Village Municipality of Pont-Rouge merged on January 3, 1996.

== Geography ==
The Jacques-Cartier River runs through the municipality from north-east to south-east and forms its boundary. The Rivière aux Pommes, a tributary of the Jacques-Cartier River, flows through the municipality from south-east to south-west. The Noire River crosses the south-east and flows south-west.

== Demographics ==
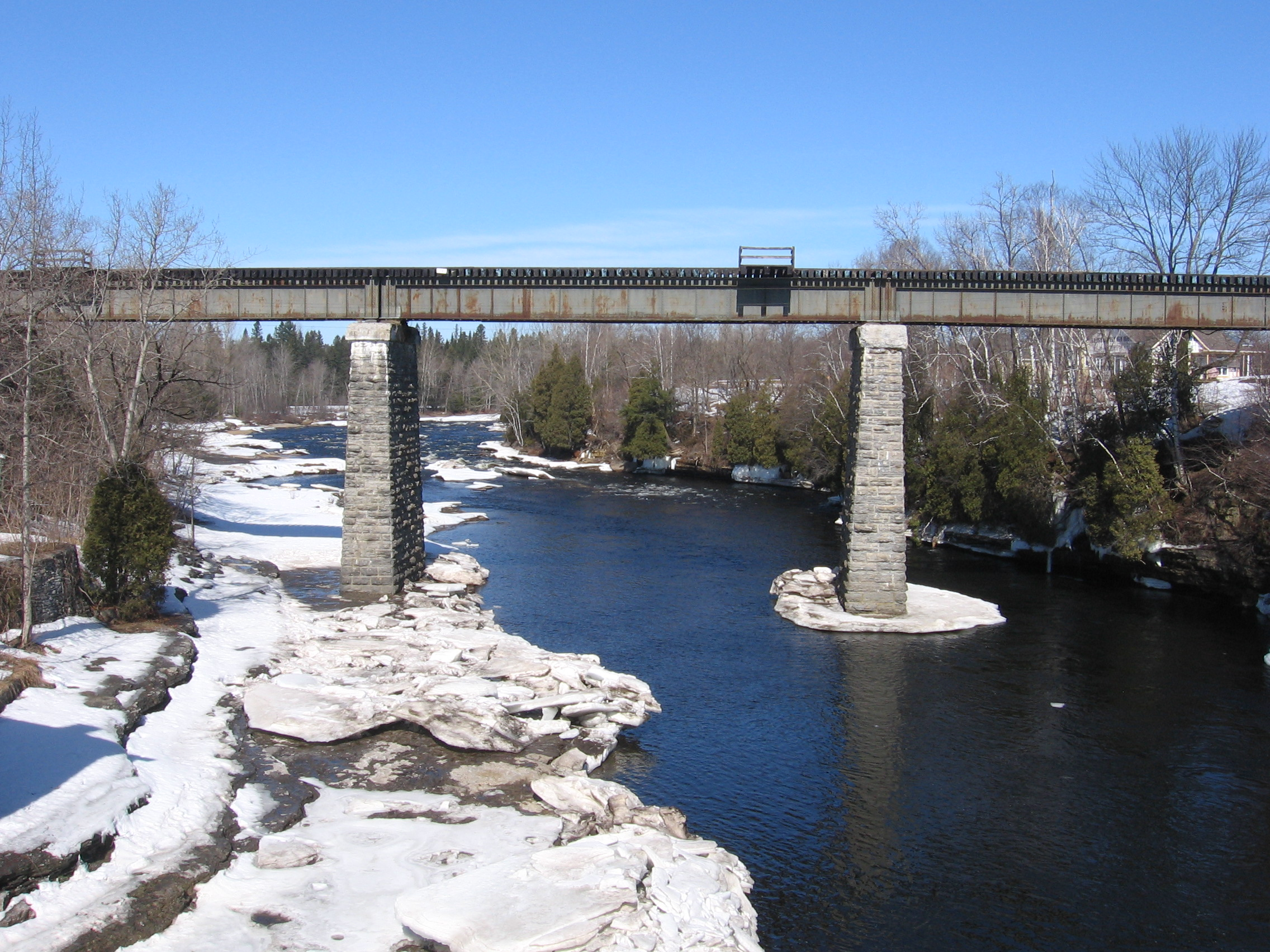
Pont-Rouge railroad bridge over the Jacques-Cartier River

In the 2021 Census of Population conducted by Statistics Canada, Pont-Rouge had a population of 10,121 living in 4,178 of its 4,344 total private dwellings, a change of 9.5% from its 2016 population of 9,240. With a land area of 121.12 km^{2} (46.76 sq mi), it had a population density of 83.6/km^{2} (216.4/sq mi) in 2021.

Historical census populations – Pont-Rouge
Year	Pop.	±%
2001	7,146	—
2006	7,518	+5.2%
2011	8,723	+16.0%
2016	9,240	+5.9%
2021	10,121	+9.5%
Source: Statistics Canada

Mother tongue (2021):

- English as first language: 1.0%
- French as first language: 97.5%
- English and French as first languages: 0.6%
- Other as first language: 0.8%

== Government ==
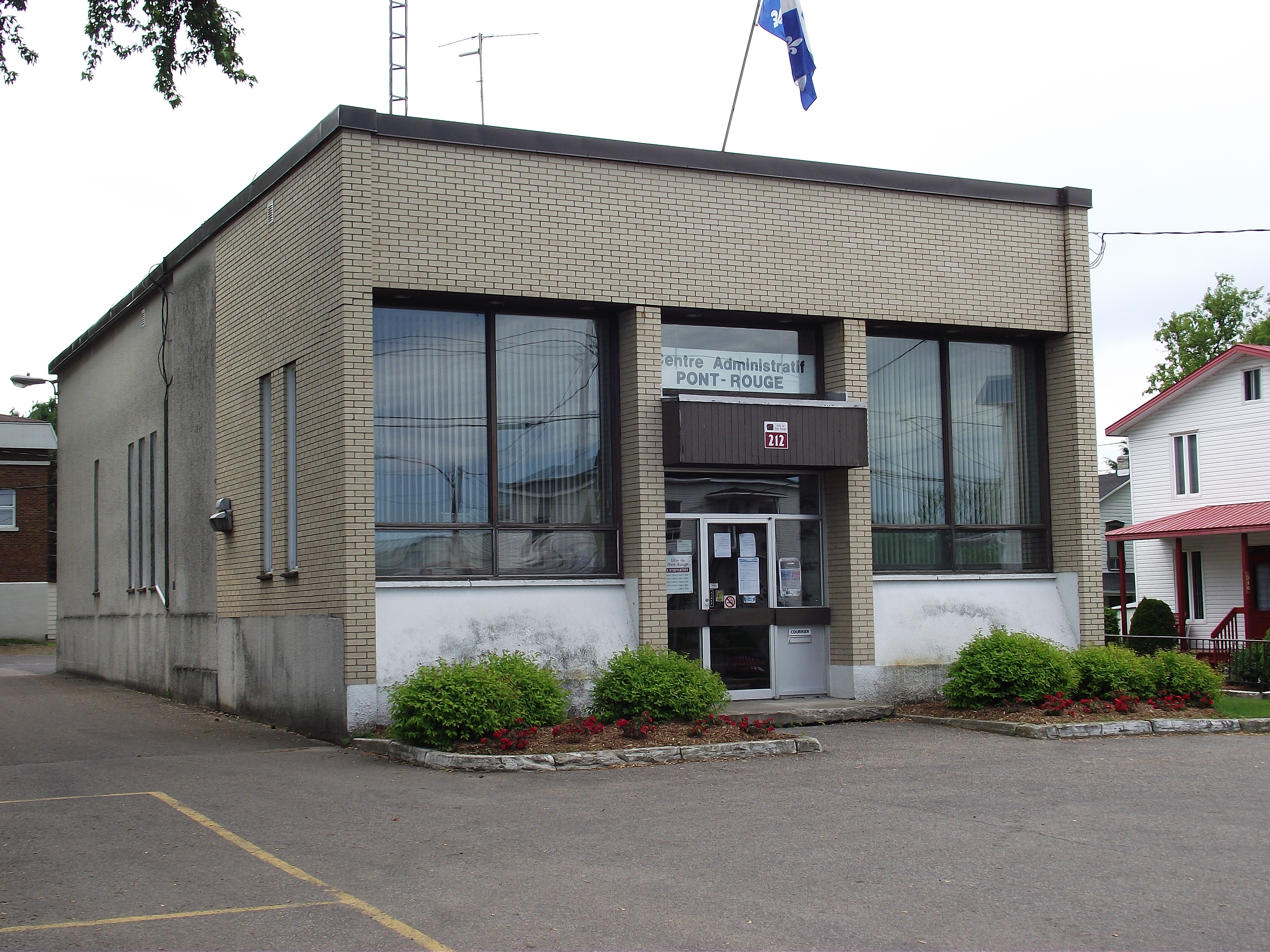
Town hall of Pont-Rouge

List of successive mayors of current city:

- 2025–present: Dany Bisson
- 2021–2025: Mario Dupont
- 2013–2021: Ghislain Langlais
- 2005–2013: Claude Bégin
- 1996–2005: Paul-Eugène Parent

List of former mayors of Pont-Rouge village:

- 1973–1996: Marcel Bédard
- 1967–1973: Albert Picher
- 1965–1967: Louis Piché
- 1964–1965: Léopold Bussières
- 1961–1964: Clément Vaugeois
- 1941–1961: Joseph-Alfred Leclerc
- 1929–1941: Edward Hamel
- 1925–1929: Joseph Arthus Bussières
- 1921–1925: Edward Hamel
- 1919–1921: Arthur Galarneau
- 1917–1919: Thomas Savary
- 1916–1917: Louis-Georges Bussières
- 1915–1916: Napoleon Larue
- 1911–1915: Arthur Galarneau
