= Neuville, Quebec =

Neuville
- City
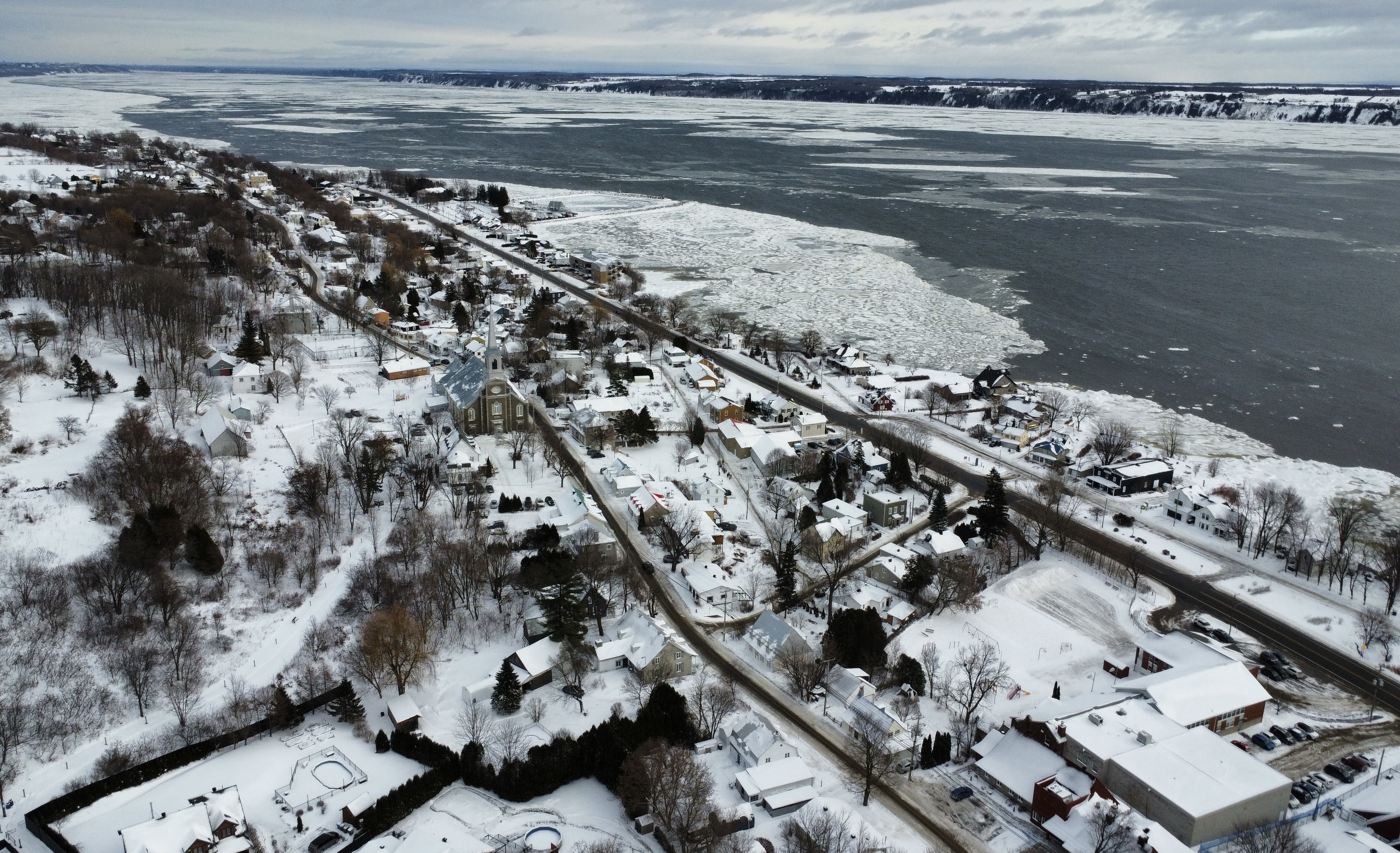

- Coat of arms
- Motto: French: Fier du Passé, Foi en l'Avenir, lit. 'Proud of the past, faith in the future'
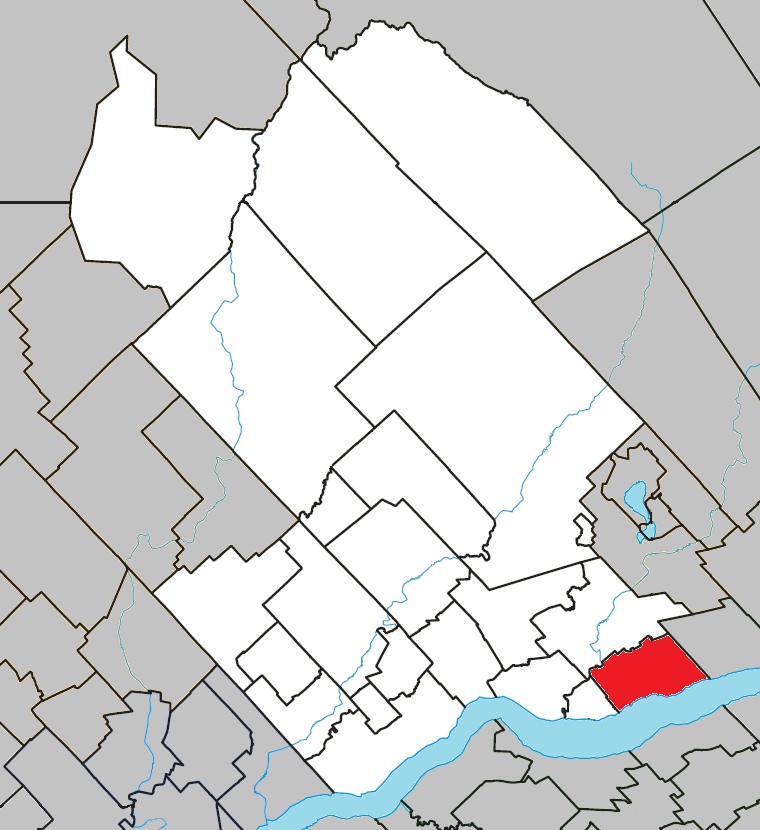
- Location within Portneuf RCM

- Location in central Quebec
- Coordinates: 46°42′N 71°35′W
- Country: Canada
- Province: Quebec
- Region: Capitale-Nationale
- RCM: Portneuf
- Settled: 1670s
- Constituted: January 2, 1997
- Named for: Nicolas Dupont de Neuville

Government
  - Mayor: Simon Sheehy
  - Fed. riding: Saint-Augustin—Portneuf—Jacques-Cartier
  - Prov. riding: Portneuf

Area
  - Total: 94.66 km^{2} (36.55 sq mi)
  - Land: 71.92 km^{2} (27.77 sq mi)
  - Urban: 3.98 km^{2} (1.54 sq mi)

Population (2021)
  - Total: 4,475
  - Density: 62.2/km^{2} (161/sq mi)
  - Urban: 2,543
  - Urban density: 639.4/km^{2} (1,656/sq mi)
  - Pop (2016–21): ▲1.9%
  - Dwellings: 1,967
- Time zone: UTC−5 (EST)
  - Summer (DST): UTC−4 (EDT)
- Postal code(s): G0A 2R0
- Area codes: 418 and 581
- Highways A-40: R-138 R-365
- Website: www.ville.neuville.qc.ca

Neuville (French pronunciation: [nøvil]) is a village on the north shore of the St. Lawrence River, just west of Quebec City, part of the Portneuf Regional County Municipality, Quebec, Canada. It was founded in 1684.

== History ==
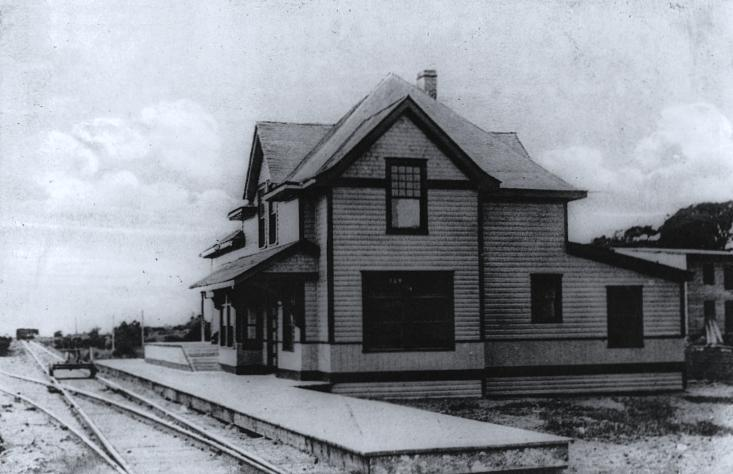
CN Station, Neuville, 1910

In 1653, the area was granted as a seigneurie by Jean de Lauson to Jean Bourdon de Saint-Jean (ca. 1601–1668) for his son Jean-François Bourdon de Dombourg (1647–1690), who was an engineer, surveyor, cartographer, and Attorney General to the sovereign. In 1680, the Dombourg Seigneurie was acquired by Nicolas Dupont de Neuville (1632–1716), thereafter the seigneurie was known as Neuville.

In 1679, the Saint-François-de-Sales Parish was formed; it became a civil parish in 1684. The place was also known as Pointe-aux-Trembles (or Pointe-au-Tremble), in reference to the point on which the church was built, which once was covered with aspen and birch.

The Battle of Pointe-aux-Trembles between France and the United Kingdom was fought nearby on the Saint Lawrence River forcing the French under Chevalier de Lévis to end their siege of Quebec in 1760.

In 1850, the post office opened, identified as Pointe-aux-Trembles. In 1855, the place was incorporated as a Parish Municipality of Saint-François-de-Sales, but renamed to Pointe-aux-Trembles some time after. In 1919, part of its territory separated to form the Village Municipality of Neuville.

On December 18, 1996, the Village Municipality of Neuville and the Parish Municipality of Pointe-aux-Trembles merged again to form the new City of Neuville.

== Demographics ==
In the 2021 Census of Population conducted by Statistics Canada, Neuville had a population of 4,475 living in 1,889 of its 1,967 total private dwellings, a change of 1.9% from its 2016 population of 4,392. With a land area of 71.92 km^{2} (27.77 sq mi), it had a population density of 62.2/km^{2} (161.2/sq mi) in 2021.

Historical census populations – Neuville, Quebec
| Year | Pop. | ±% |
|---|---|---|
| 2001 | 3,341 | — |
| 2006 | 3,638 | +8.9% |
| 2011 | 3,888 | +6.9% |
| 2016 | 4,392 | +13.0% |
| 2021 | 4,475 | +1.9% |
Source: Statistics Canada

Historical census populations – Neuville Village (1919–1997)

| Year | Pop. | ±% |
|---|---|---|
| 1921 | 365 | — |
| 1931 | 571 | +56.4% |
| 1941 | 616 | +7.9% |
| 1951 | 759 | +23.2% |
| 1956 | 727 | −4.2% |
| 1961 | 802 | +10.3% |
| 1966 | 849 | +5.9% |

| Year | Pop. | ±% |
|---|---|---|
| 1971 | 798 | −6.0% |
| 1976 | 918 | +15.0% |
| 1981 | 996 | +8.5% |
| 1986 | 929 | −6.7% |
| 1991 | 1,006 | +8.3% |
| 1996 | 1,013 | +0.7% |

Source: Statistics Canada

== Local government ==
List of former mayors since current city:

- Normand Bolduc (1997–2009)
- Bernard Gaudreau (2009–2025)
- Simon Sheehy (2025–present)
