= Quebec Route 365 =

Highway in Quebec, Canada

Route 365

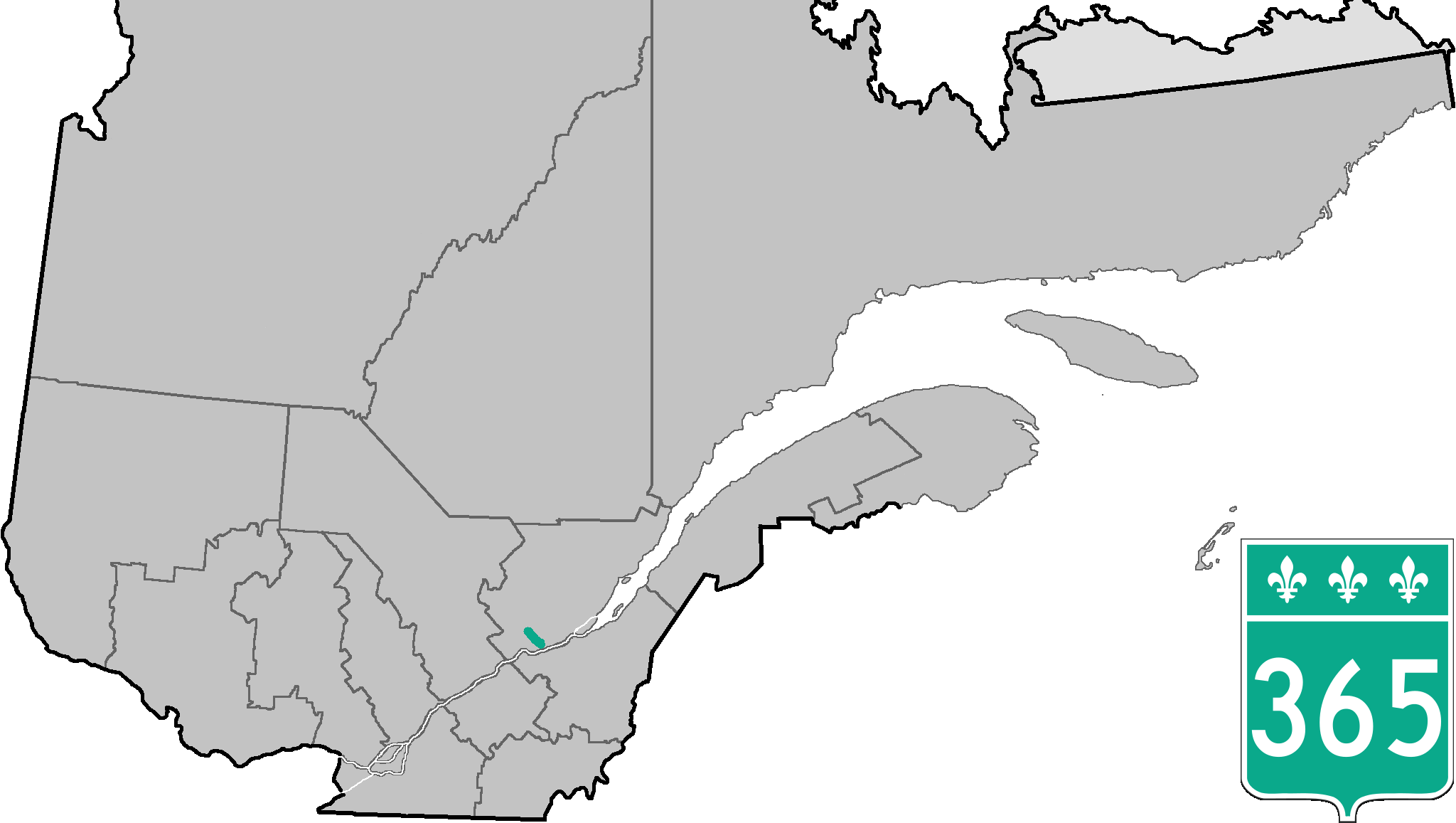

Route information
- Maintained by Transports Québec
- Length: 28 km (17 mi)

Major junctions
- North end: R-354 / R-367 in Saint-Raymond
- A-40 near Neuville
- South end: R-138 in Neuville

Location
- Country: Canada
- Province: Quebec
- Major cities: Saint-Raymond-de-Portneuf, Neuville

Highway system
- Quebec provincial highways; Autoroutes; List; Former
← R-364	→ R-366

Route 365 is a 28 km north–south regional road in Quebec, Canada, linking Neuville and Saint-Raymond. It is the main road linking Autoroute 40 (exit 281) and the Quebec City area to St-Raymond and Pont-Rouge.

Pont-Rouge is the only city it goes through, where it overlaps Route 358 for only 400 meters.

== Municipalities along Route 365 ==
- Saint-Raymond-de-Portneuf
- Pont-Rouge
- Neuville

== See also ==
- List of Quebec provincial highways
