= National Transcontinental Railway =

Railway enterprise in Canada

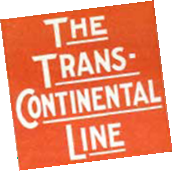

Overview
- Headquarters: Winnipeg, Manitoba, Canada
- Locale: New Brunswick, Quebec, Ontario, Manitoba
- Dates of operation: 1913–1918
- Successor: Canadian National Railway

Technical
- Track gauge: 4 ft 8 1/2 in (1,435 mm) standard gauge

The National Transcontinental Railway (reporting mark NTR) was a historic railway between Winnipeg, Manitoba, and Moncton, New Brunswick, in Canada. Much of the line is now operated by the Canadian National Railway.

== The Grand Trunk partnership ==
Map showing the territory of the National Transcontinental Railway, in Quebec and Ontario (very pale blue along the top of the map).

The completion of construction of Canada's first transcontinental railway, the Canadian Pacific Railway (CPR) on November 7, 1885, preceded a tremendous economic expansion and immigration boom in western Canada during the late 19th and early 20th centuries, but the monopolistic policies of the CPR, coupled with its southerly routing (new scientific discoveries were pushing the northern boundary of cereal crops), led to increasing western discontent with the railway and federal transportation policies.

The federal government had encouraged the Grand Trunk Railway (GTR) system in the 1870s to consider building the transcontinental rail line. During the same time, a government survey party under the direction of Sandford Fleming set out across Canada to survey routes for the proposed railway. The "Canadian Pacific Survey", as it was called, surveyed routes to a number of Pacific Coast destinations (including Victoria on Vancouver Island). When Grand Trunk balked at building a railway using the survey, the government turned to the privately owned Canadian Pacific. The CPR, one of whose directors was James J. Hill, a Canadian who had settled in Minnesota (and eventual builder of the transcontinental Great Northern Railway located just south of the US/Canada border), favoured a route farther south, as Hill hoped to tap into freight flows from the northern US states. That left Canada with a single transcontinental route close to the US border, since CPR chose to use Rogers and Kicking Horse Passes rather than the surveyed route over the Yellowhead.

By the early 1900s, the GTR was willing to consider building a second transcontinental system for the country if it received government assistance, similar to the CPR's deal. However, while the government and GTR were considering whether to proceed and negotiating terms, the Canadian Northern Railway was already building a second transcontinental rail line.

The Canadian Northern Railway (CNoR) was an upstart regional system for the prairies that had begun in Manitoba under entrepreneurs William Mackenzie and Donald Mann in 1899 through their amalgamation of several smaller branch lines. The CNoR started the process of building Canada's second transcontinental system between 1903 and 1912. The system was built from Winnipeg westbound to Vancouver and eastbound to Toronto and Montreal. In addition to an extensive network of branch lines in the prairie provinces, CNoR had many branch lines in Ontario, Quebec, and the Maritime Provinces.

But Mackenzie and Mann had spurned the federal government's offer for assistance to expand the CNoR in 1903 and in doing so, the federal government under Prime Minister Wilfrid Laurier committed to building a transcontinental system in partnership with the GTR. In keeping with the trend of railways to exploit virgin territories, the government-backed "transcon" would run from the port of Prince Rupert, British Columbia, across the northern portion of the prairies to Winnipeg, and from there across northern Ontario and Quebec to Quebec City where it would cross the St. Lawrence River and continue on to its eastern terminus at Moncton, New Brunswick, by way of a route directly across central New Brunswick.

The GTR board of directors wished to assume the financial risks only for the portion of the system west of Winnipeg and so the agreement resulted in two railway systems being funded by government: the Grand Trunk Pacific Railway, which would run from Winnipeg to Prince Rupert and be built and operated by GTR as a subsidiary, and the government-owned and -built National Transcontinental Railway (NTR) would run from Winnipeg to Moncton and be operated by GTR upon completion.

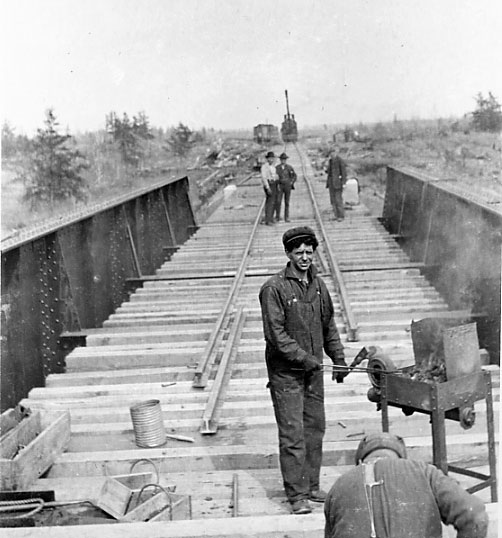
Building a bridge on the National Transcontinental Railway, ca 1910.

The GTPR/NTR deal came in the heady final days of Canada's railway boom and would soon prove to be the financial straw that broke the back of Canada's railway industry during the First World War. Canada has supported two transcontinental railway systems for many years, but even in 1914 it was not clear that there was enough traffic for three. The GTPR/NTR system was surveyed and construction began in 1905 and the entire system was finished (except for the Quebec Bridge) in 1913. The task was monumental and no expense was spared in building a railway system of minimal grades and curvature. In crossing the Appalachian Mountains of eastern Quebec and northern New Brunswick, the NTR used massive bridges, such as the Cap-Rouge trestle and the Little Salmon River Trestle (the second largest railway bridge in Canada) to span wide valleys. The Quebec Bridge over the St. Lawrence River, the largest cantilever span in the world, took $40 million of the $170 million total project cost alone. The territory across northern Quebec and Ontario to Winnipeg, through the heart of the Canadian Shield, posed an extremely difficult construction obstacle. It also generated very little traffic.

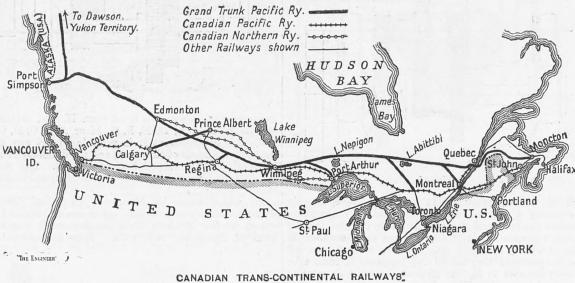
The system in 1906, soon after the construction of the transcontinental railway. The map shows the planned route from Edmonton to the western seaboard which was later redirected to Prince Rupert.

The Grand Trunk Pacific/National Transcontinental route remained intact for only a few years during World War I. The GTP had built through the Yellowhead Pass on a route paralleled later by Canadian Northern, but near Mount Robson, GTP headed toward Prince Rupert. Prince Rupert was one of several possible Pacific termini for the line. Originally, Port Simpson on the Alaska border was selected, but a border dispute with the United States in the early 20th century left Canada concerned about the defensibility of any Pacific rail terminal, and the terminal for GTP was moved south to Prince Rupert. That selection potentially saved a day of steaming for ships to or from Asia.

Much GTP track through the Yellowhead Pass did not last even to the end of World War I. As a government-imposed war measure to garner rails for potential use in France, trackage was consolidated between Lobstick, Alberta, and Red Pass Junction, British Columbia with Canadian Northern in 1917, and rails were lifted from the nearly brand-new GTP.

== Canadian Government Railways ==
The GTR reneged on its deal with the federal government for operating the eastern section (the NTR) and the government folded it, along with the Intercolonial Railway of Canada (IRC), the Prince Edward Island Railway (PEIR), and the Hudson Bay Railway (as well as some smaller lines) into the Canadian Government Railways in 1915 for administrative and financial purposes, although the individual systems maintained their independent names. The CGR and its subsidiaries would last until 1918.

== Canadian National Railways ==
On September 6, 1918, the CNoR was nationalized after becoming insolvent and its government-appointed directors were ordered to assume operation of the CGR system. On December 20, 1918, the federal government created the Canadian National Railways (CNR) under which the CNoR and CGR were to be operated.

Several years later, on July 12, 1920, the GTPR was nationalized and entered the CNR fold. The GTR itself was placed under government control several weeks earlier on May 21, 1920; however, GTR was not merged into the CNR until January 23, 1923.

== Legacy ==
Booklet published by the Conservative Party opposing the large amount of money given by the Liberal Party for the construction of the NTR.

The significant cost overruns in construction of the NTR/GTPR contributed to the downfall of Laurier's Liberal Party in 1911, but Robert Borden's Conservative Party was forced to finish the project, including the disastrous spanning of the St. Lawrence River with the Quebec Bridge.

The NTR route across northern Quebec and Ontario, far from the major population centres, had been approved by Laurier's government largely because of the support of his Quebec caucus to make Quebec City the preferred port for western grain shipments. The NTR in those provinces never lived up to its expectations for creating traffic, but for a time, it aided the resource-rich mining communities of northern Ontario and northwestern Quebec.

Under CNR (CN post-1960), the NTR route across northern Quebec and Ontario became a marginal secondary main line, with little in the way of through freight or passenger traffic. At Nakina, the CNR had constructed the Longlac-Nakina Cut-Off, a 29.4-mile (47.3 km) section of track linking the NTR with the Canadian Northern line at Longlac, which was completed in 1924. A 122-mile (196 km) section of the NTR mainline between Nakina and Calstock, Ontario, was abandoned in 1986, and the Ontario Northland Railway purchased the section of NTR mainline between Calstock and Cochrane, Ontario, in 1993. The mainline was also abandoned by CN for 82 miles (132 km) east of Cochrane to La Sarre, Quebec, in 1997.

West of Nakina, the combined NTR/GTPR line forms CN's transcontinental mainline through to Tête Jaune Cache, British Columbia, and sees very heavy traffic. From Tête Jaune Cache (Yellowhead Pass), the GTPR line to Prince Rupert is a secondary mainline, as the CNoR line southwest from Tête Jaune Cache to Vancouver forms the CN mainline. In the 1990s and 2000s, congestion at many ports along the west coast of North America made the GTPR's development of Prince Rupert an attractive alternative. Canadian National Railways, now a private corporation, as of 2012 had completed port facilities at Prince Rupert capable of handling two million 20-foot equivalent units (TEU) per year and was lengthening passing sidings on the line from Jasper to Prince Rupert. CN now offers daily container train service between Prince Rupert, Chicago, and Memphis.

East of La Sarre to Quebec City, the former NTR mainline supports a network of CN branchlines in northern Quebec, but the Quebec Bridge and related trackage in the Quebec City area is heavily used by freight and passenger traffic as part of the Quebec City–Windsor Corridor.

From Quebec City east to Pelletier, Quebec, the former NTR mainline was abandoned in the 1980s after the completion in 1976 of a 30-mile (48 km) "cutoff" from the latter station to CN's former Intercolonial Railway mainline in the St. Lawrence River valley west of Rivière-du-Loup. However, from Pelletier east to Moncton, the NTR mainline across central New Brunswick, including the massive bridges in the Appalachian Mountains, is still heavily used since it forms the core of CN's Montreal-Halifax mainline.

== See also ==
- History of rail transport in Canada
