= Saint-Alban generating station-2 =

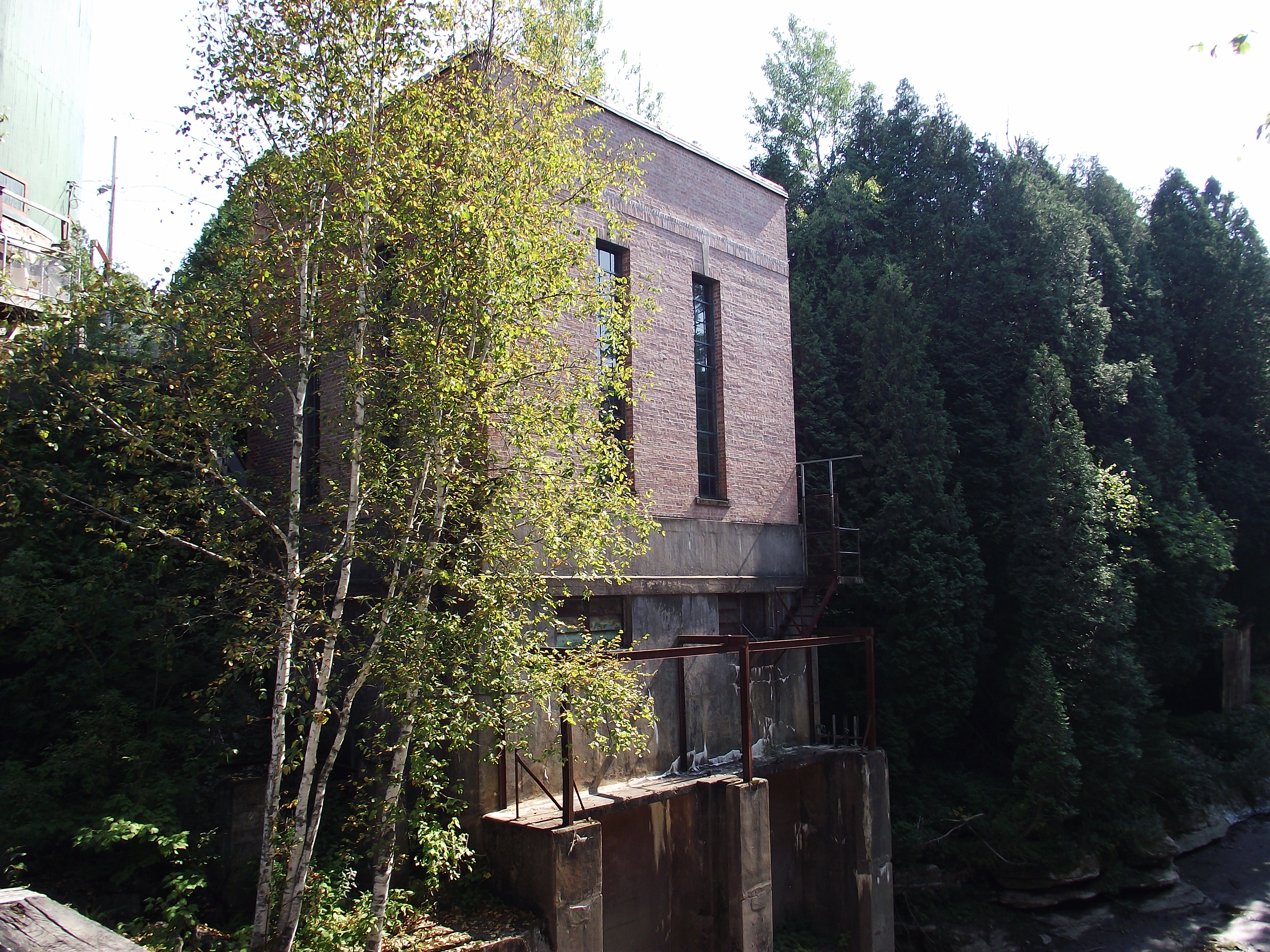

- Location within Quebec
- Country: Canada
- Location: Saint-Alban, Portneuf Regional County Municipality, Capitale-Nationale, Quebec, Canada
- Coordinates: 46°42′25″N 72°04′57″W
- Purpose: Power
- Status: Operational
- Construction began: 1925
- Opening date: 1927; 99 years ago

Saint-Alban generating station-2
- Interactive map of Saint-Alban generating station-2

The Saint-Alban-2 power station is an old hydroelectric power station located on the Sainte-Anne River at the level of the Sainte-Anne River Gorges in Saint-Alban in province of Quebec (Canada). It was built between 1925 and 1927 to replace the Saint-Alban-2 power station, which was destroyed by a flood in 1924. It was in use until 1984. It was built at the start of the 2000s to be included in the Portneuf Regional Natural Park. The power station, the balance chimney, the penstock as well as the dam were cited as heritage building in 2002 by the municipality of Saint-Alban.

== History ==
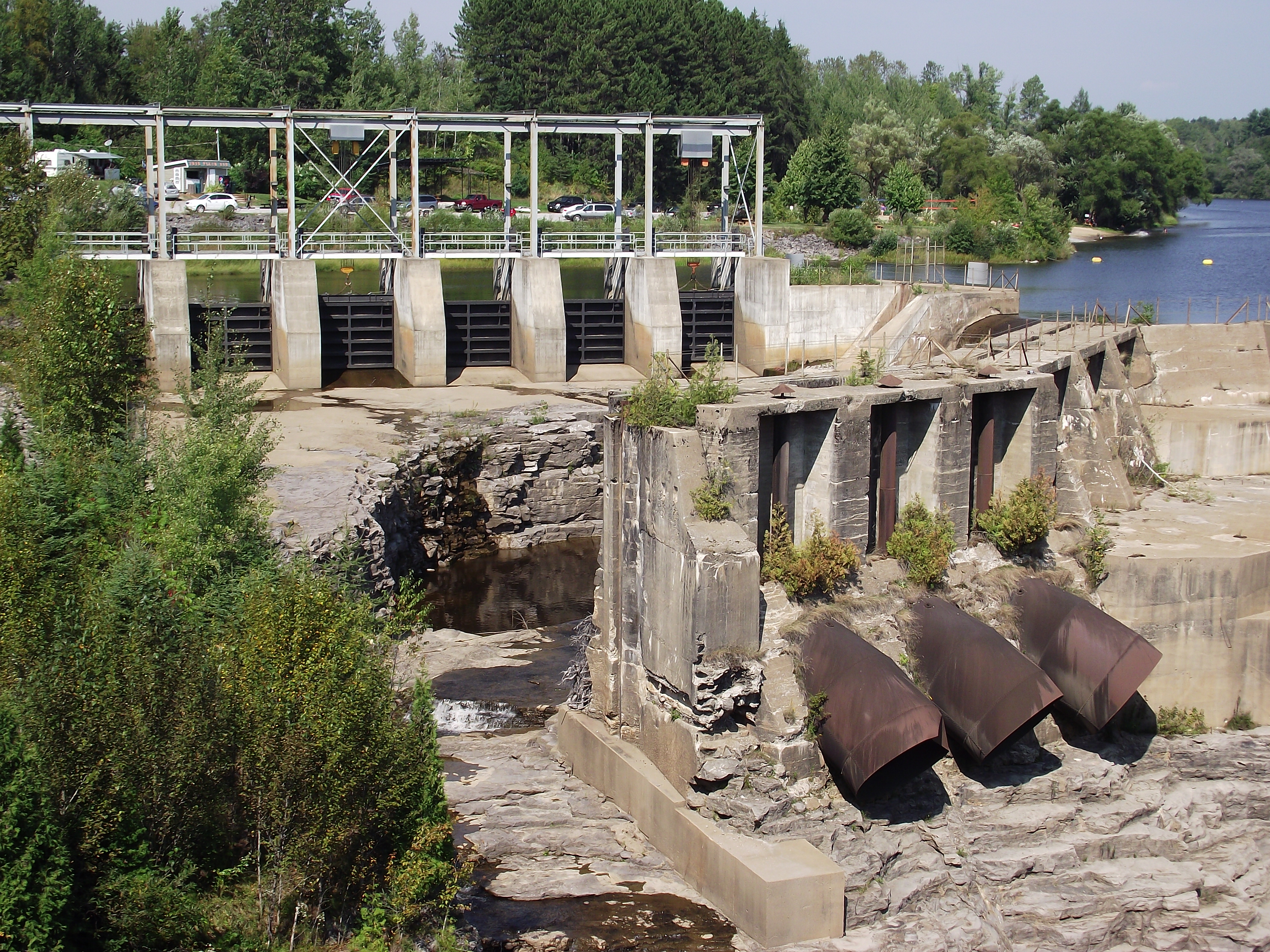
Remains of the Saint-Alban-1 power station

The Saint-Alban-1 power station was built between 1911 and 1917 by the Portneuf Hydraulic Company. In 1924, a flood destroyed the powerhouse, causing the bankruptcy of the company. A new power plant was built by the Portneuf Power Company, a subsidiary of the Shawinigan Water & Power Company between 1915 and 1927. The new power plant incorporates elements of the old power plant, including the arch dam . She built new structures, including a power plant further from the falls, a penstock and a balance chimney.

In 1963, following the nationalization of electricity, the power plant passed into the hands of Hydro-Québec. It was closed in 1984. A new powerhouse was built at the new dam in 1996 by Algonquin Power Fund. In the early 2000s, the site of the power station was set up to accommodate one of the sectors of the Portneuf Regional Natural Park. The Saint-Alban-2 generating station was cited as a heritage building by the municipality of Saint-Alban on April 2, 2002.

== Appendices ==
=== Related articles ===
- List of the real estate heritage of the Capitale-Nationale
- Cave of Cascatelles
- Portneuf Regional Natural Park

=== External links ===
- Official website
