= Clair Lake (Sainte-Christine-d'Auvergne) =

Lake in Capitale-Nationale, Quebec, Canada

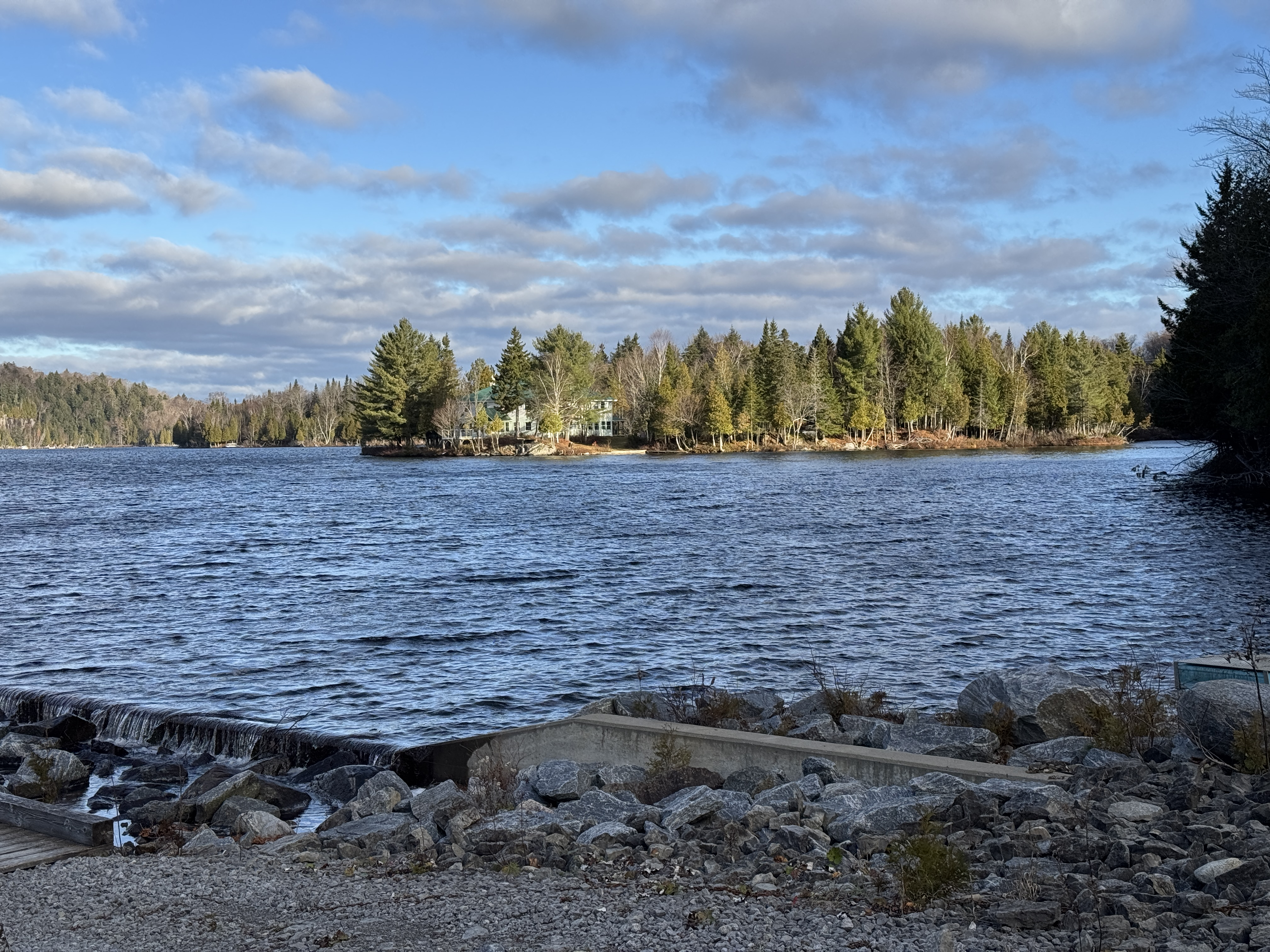
- Chemin du Lac Clair, Saint-Alban

- Location in Quebec
- Location: Sainte-Christine-d'Auvergne and Saint-Alban municipality
- Coordinates: 46.82383°N 72.08908°W
- Max. length: 2.7 km (1.7 mi)
- Max. width: 1.8 km (1.1 mi)

Lake Clair (Sainte-Christine-d'Auvergne), Lac Clair (French) is located in the municipalities of Saint-Alban and Sainte-Christine-d’Auvergne, Portneuf RCM, Capitale-Nationale, Quebec, Canada.

== Geography ==
Clair Lake is part of the Noire River (Sainte-Anne River tributary) watershed. It measures 2.7 km long by 1.8 km wide, in a forest zone, at the edge of the St. Lawrence lowlands. Lake Clair is a residential area, not accessible to the public.

Clair Lake Road west runs along the shore of Clair Lake.

Clair Lake (Sainte-Christine-d’Auvergne)

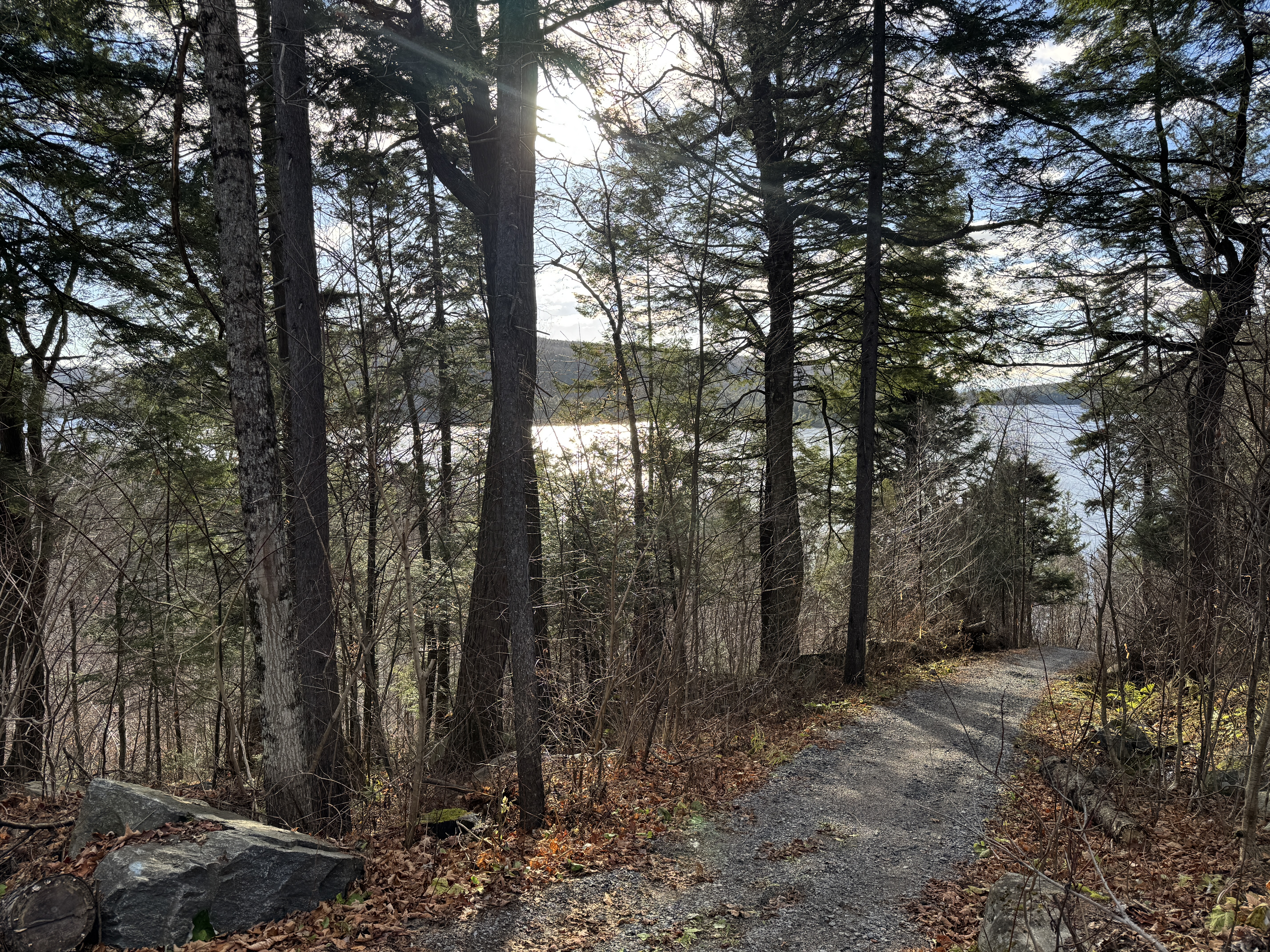
Through the branches, steep forest shore

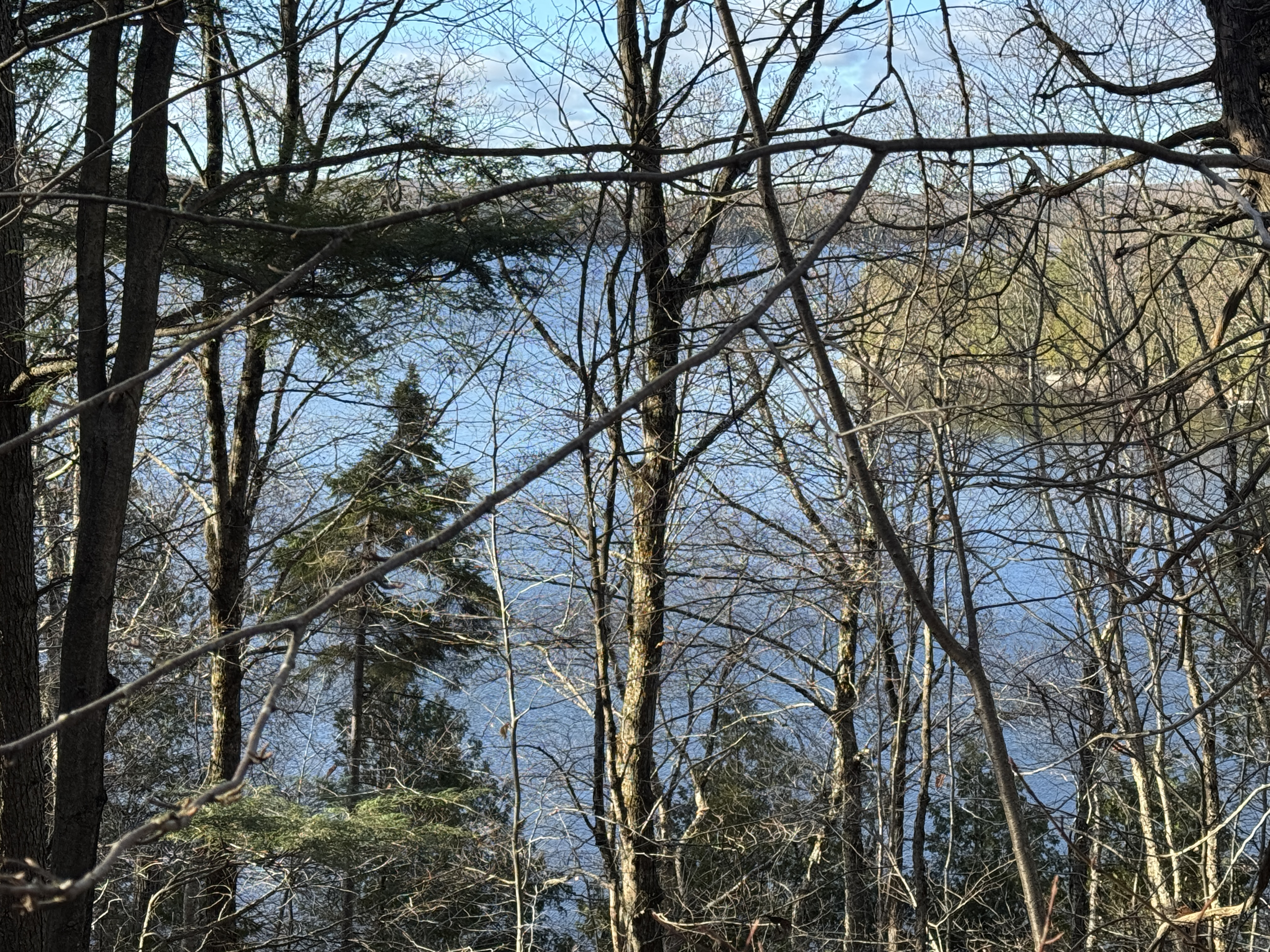
Through the branches, steep forest shore

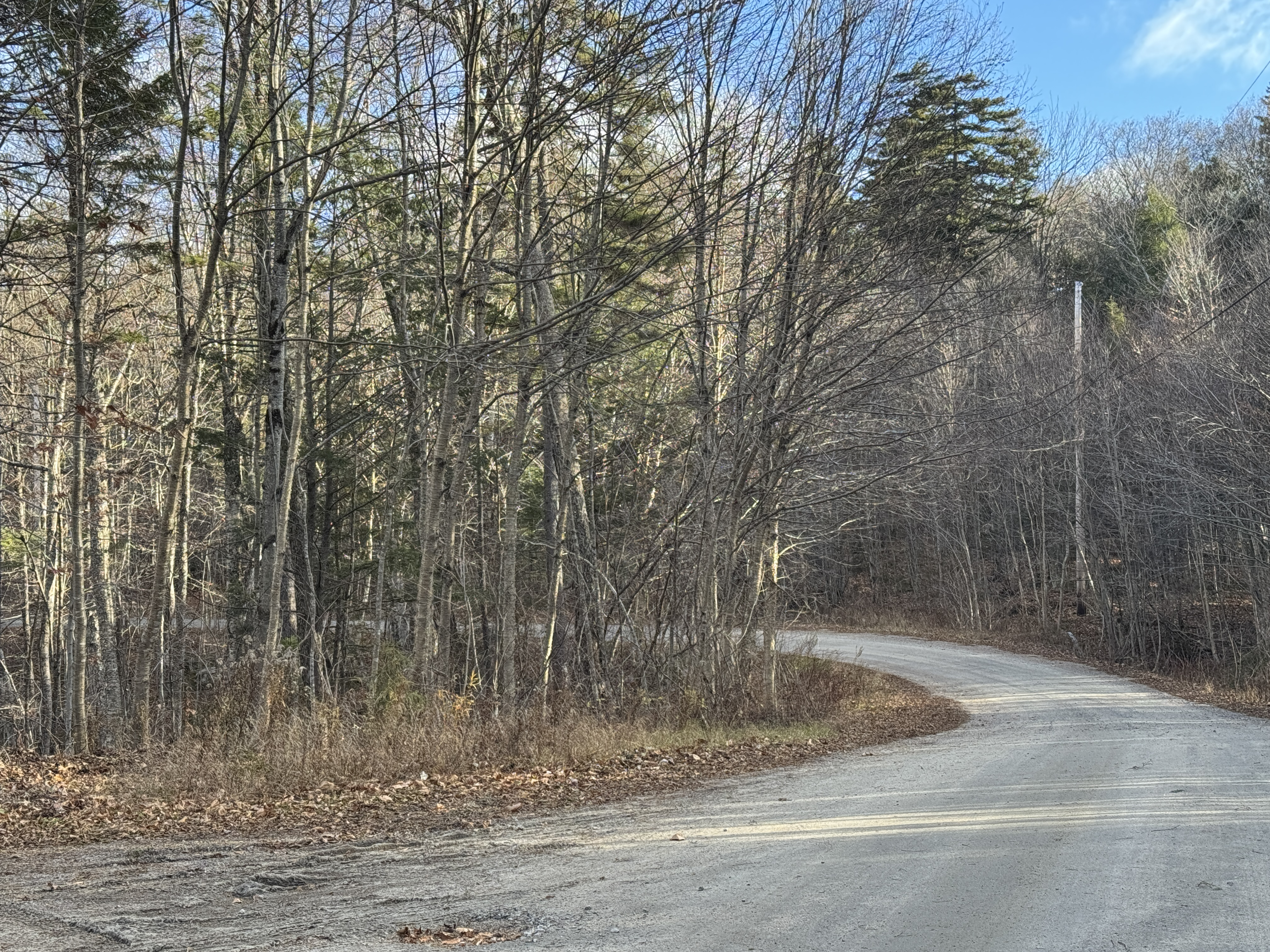
Chemin du lac Clair, forest road

== Toponymy ==
The toponym "Lac Clair" was formalized on December 5, 1968, by Commission de toponymie du Québec.

== Economy ==
High-end residential and resort development around Lake Clair represents 10% of the land value of the municipality of Sainte-Christine-d’Auvergne.

== See also ==
- Portneuf Regional County Municipality (RCM)
- Sainte-Christine-d'Auvergne, Quebec
- Saint-Alban. Quebec
- Portneuf Regional Natural Park
- Noire River (Sainte-Anne River)
- Sainte-Anne River (Les Chenaux)
