= Noire River (Sainte-Anne River tributary) =

Noire River (Sainte-Anne River tributary) Rivière Noire (French)
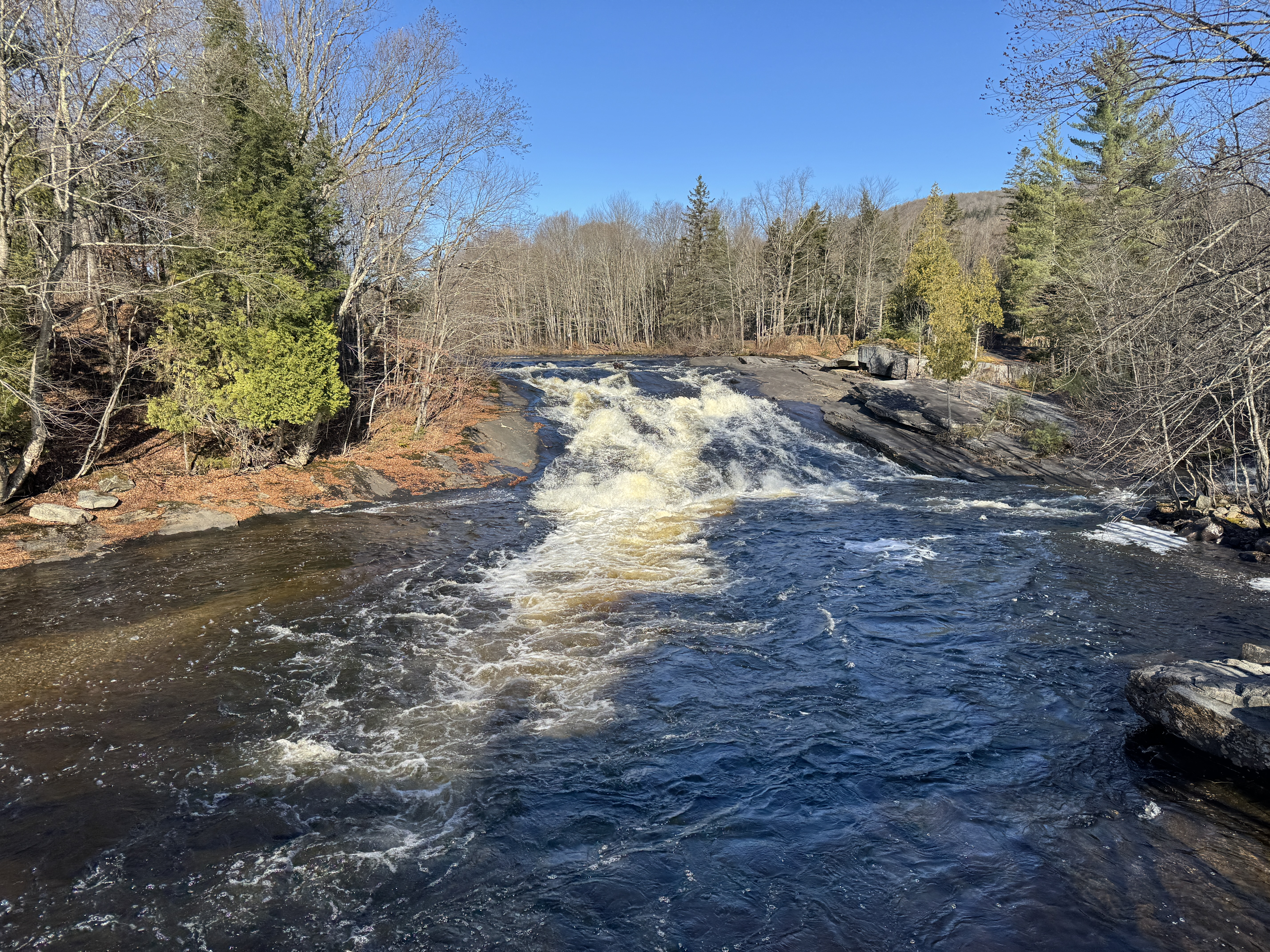
- Marcotte Falls, mid-November colors

Location
- Country: Canada
- Province: Quebec
- Regions: Capitale-Nationale; Mauricie
- Regional County Municipality: Portneuf
- Municipalities: Rivière-à-Pierre; Saint-Alban; Saint-Casimir

Physical characteristics
- Source: Long (Saint-Alban), Clair (Sainte-Christine-d'Auvergne) Lakes
  - location: Portneuf RCM
- Mouth: River Sainte-Anne (Mauricie)
- Length: 62 km (39 mi)
- Discharge
  - location: Saint-Casimir, Quebec

Noire River (French: Rivière Noire, pronounced [ʁivjɛʁ nwaʁ]) is one of the main watercourses of the Sainte-Anne River (Les Chenaux) watershed, it measures 62 km in length, its watershed has an area of 568 km².

The main sources of the Noire River are Long (Saint-Alban) and Clair (Sainte-Christine-d'Auvergne) lakes, it flows into the waters of the Sainte-Anne River in Saint-Casimir, Quebec municipality.

== Flora ==
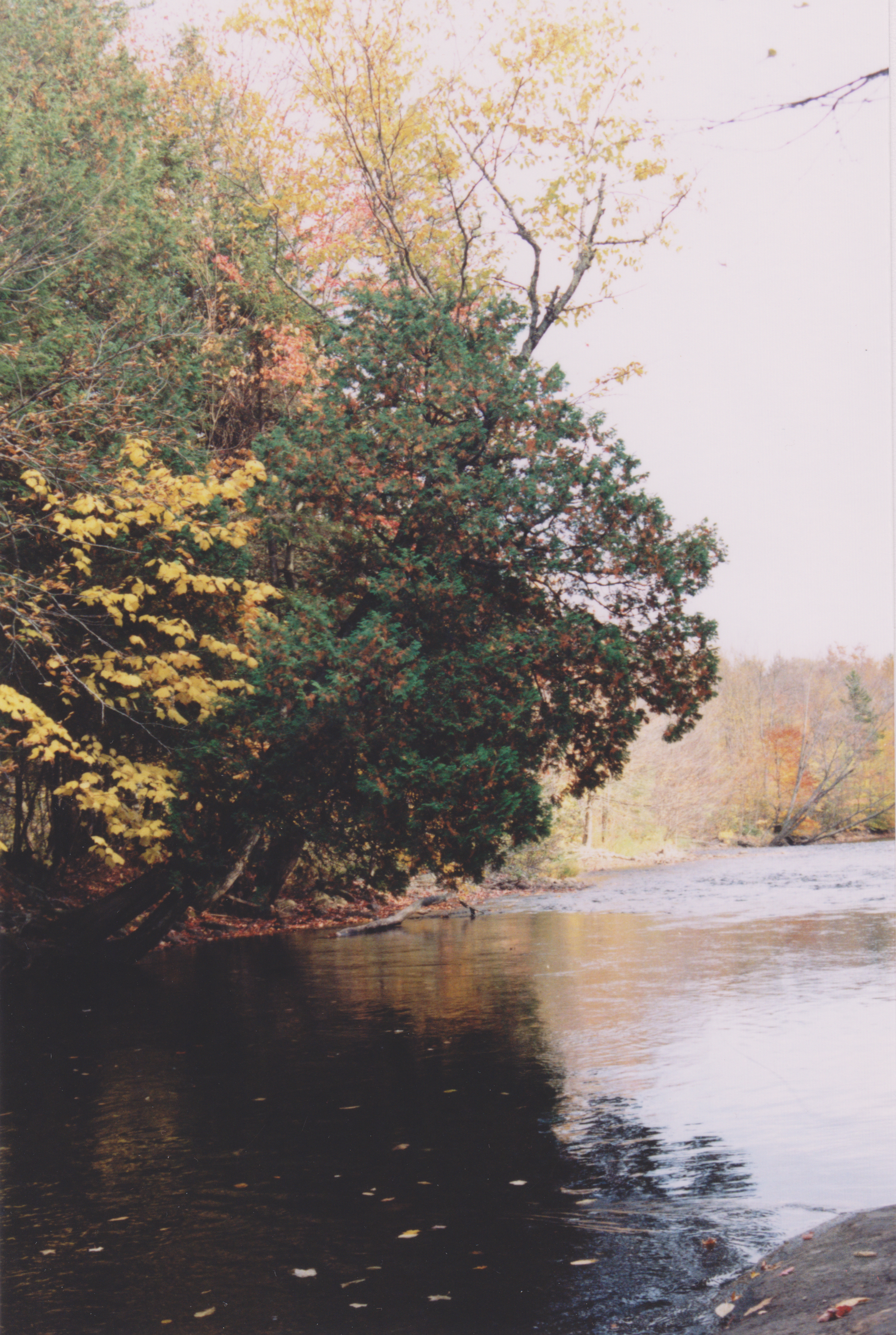
Mid-October colors, Yellow birch, Larch, Tamarack, Hemlock and others, Noire River, Saint-Alban

The flora observed today in the territory of the Portneuf Regional Natural Park, and the portion of the Black River which flows there, does not represent the forest of the regional pre-industria eral. A large part of the territory has been the subject of logging for more than 200 years. So, the harvest of Tamarack (Red spruce) and Allegheny birch (Yellow birch) was done without concern for regeneration, between 1870 and 1890 the harvest of the bark of Canadian tsuga (Tsuga) for its tannery properties led to the modification of the composition of all the ecosystem.

- Betula alleghaniensis Britton. — Bouleau des Alléghanys. — Merisier. — (Yellow birch).
- Larix laricina (Du Roi) Koch. — Mélèze laricin. — Épinette rouge. — (Larch, Tamarack).
- Tsuga canadensis (Linné) Carrière. — Tsuga du Canada. — Pruche. — (Hemlock).

== Geography ==
The Noire River has its source in Lakes Long (Saint-Alban) and Clair (Sainte-Christine-d'Auvergne), the Noire River flows for 62 km. The Blanche River (Saint-Casimir) flows into it about 2 km before the Sainte-Anne River (Les Chenaux), in Saint-Casimir, Quebec.

The Noire River sub-watershed has an area (568.38 km²). The Blanche River (Saint-Casimir), the secondary sub-watershed drains 37% of the Black River sub-basin.

Noire River, overview

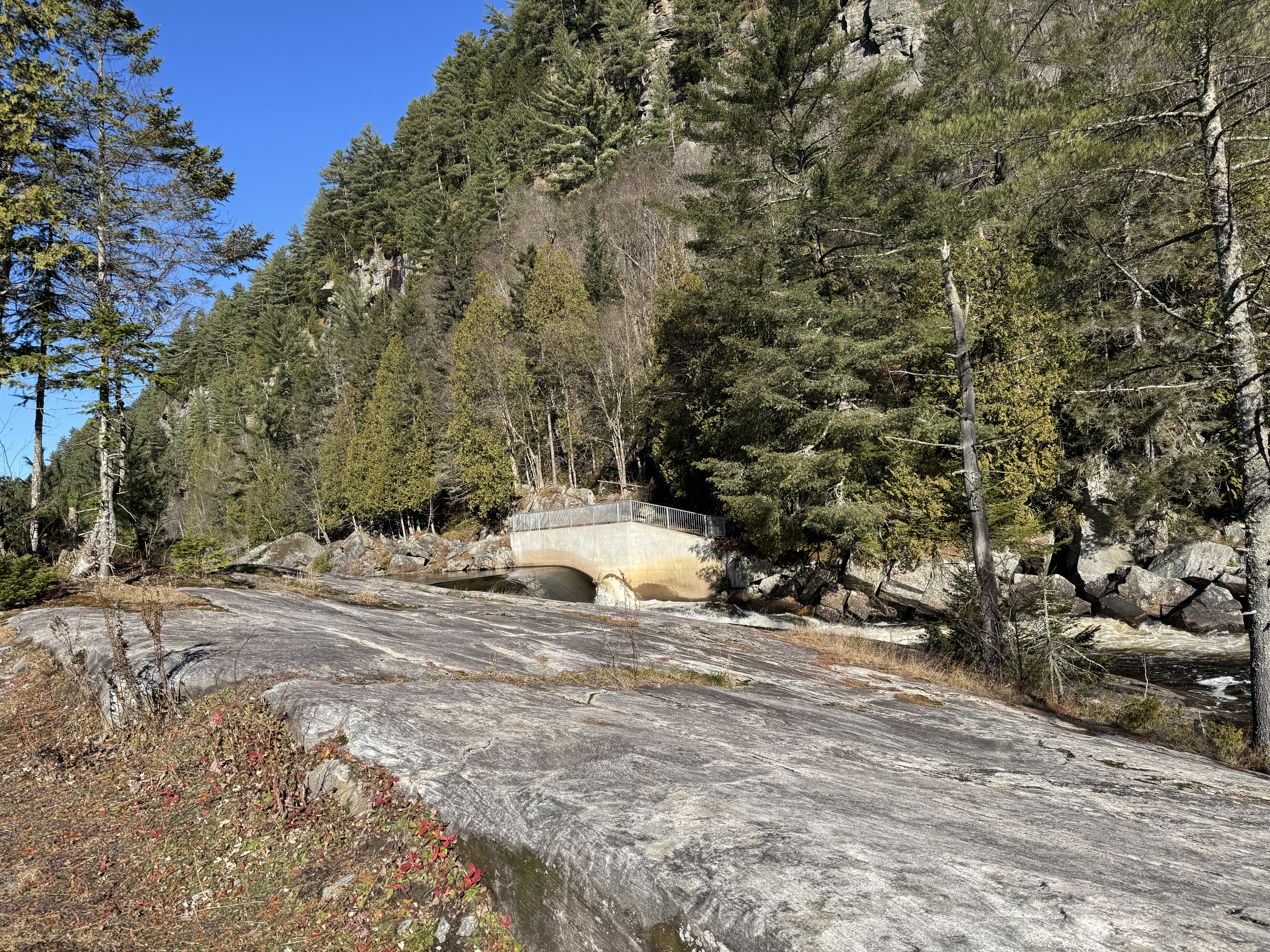
Jean-Noël Côté (1942-2007) Dam, outlet of Long Lake (Saint-Alban) and Noire River source

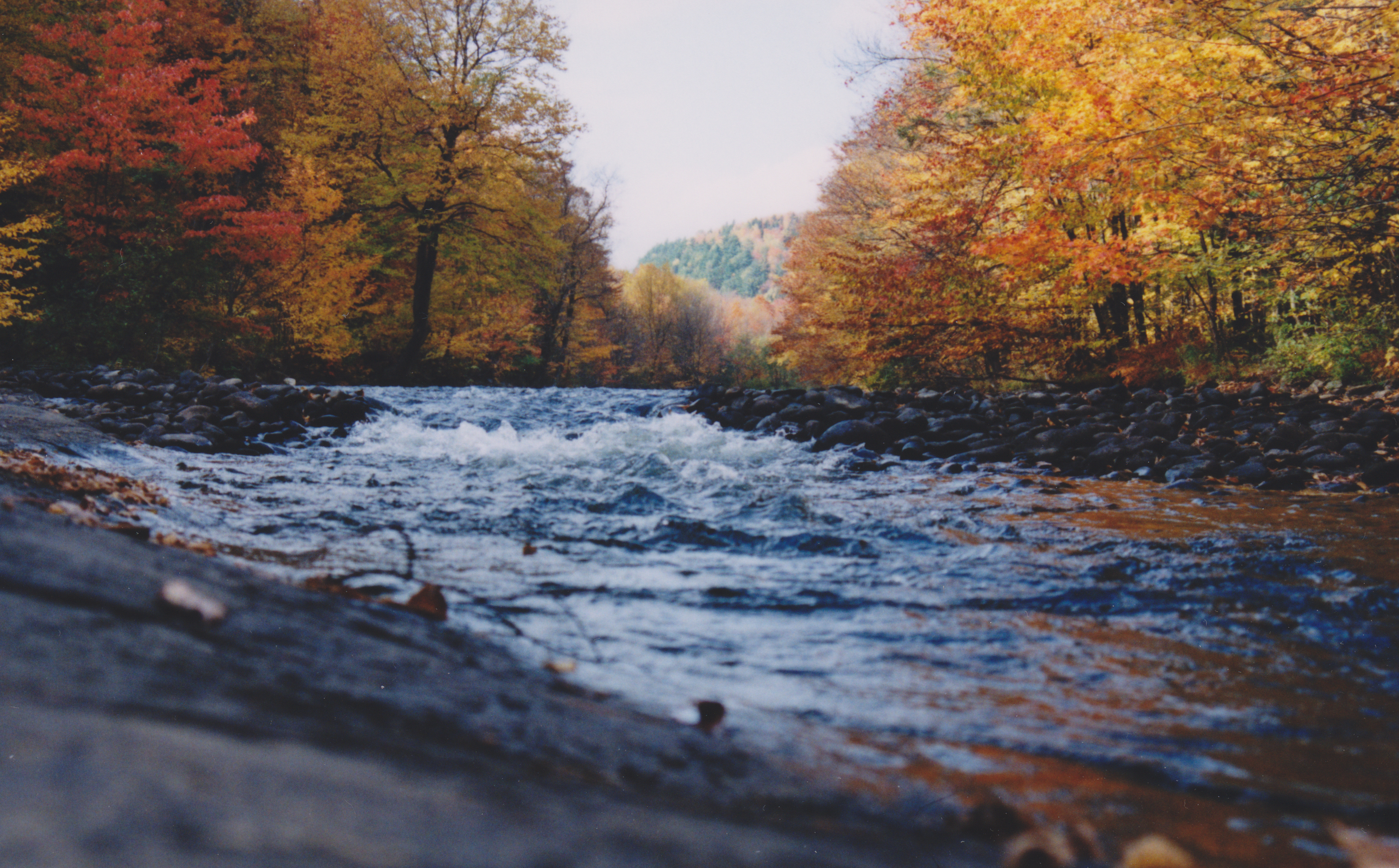
Long Lake outlet, accessible by Lac Clair and Lac Long roads, Saint-Alban

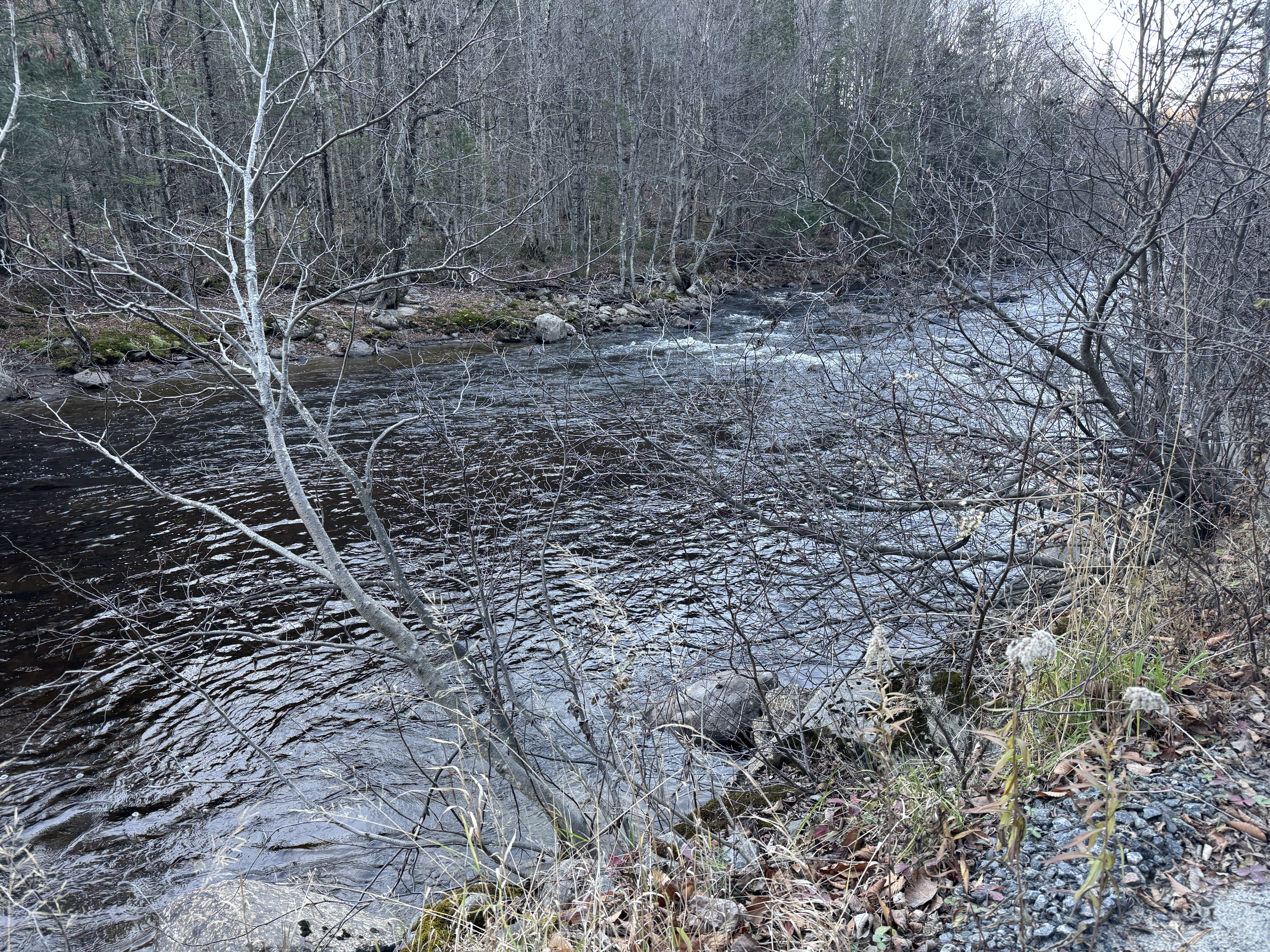
Chemin du Lac Clair, Saint-Alban
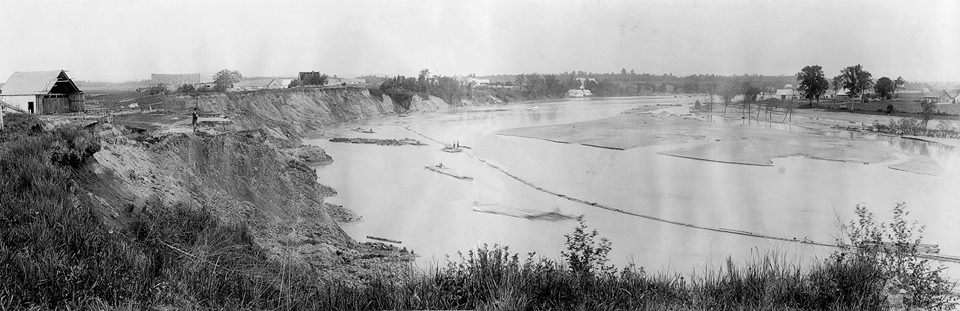
Noire River (Rivière Noire), landslide 1894, in Saint-Alban

== See also ==
- Rivière-à-Pierre, Quebec
- Saint-Alban, Quebec
- Saint-Casimir, Quebec
- Saint-Raymond, Quebec,
- Saint-Léonard-de-Portneuf, Quebec
- Notre-Dame-de-Montauban, Quebec
- Sainte-Christine-d'Auvergne, Quebec
- Saint-Thuribe, Quebec
- Portneuf Regional County Municipality
- Capitale-Nationale
- Sainte-Anne River (Mauricie)
- Blanche River (Noire River)
- Montauban Lake
- Lac Long
- Clair Lake (Sainte-Christine-d'Auvergne)
- Blanche River (Noire River)
- List of rivers of Quebec
