= Long Lake (Saint-Alban) =

Lake in Saint-Alban, Quebec, Canada

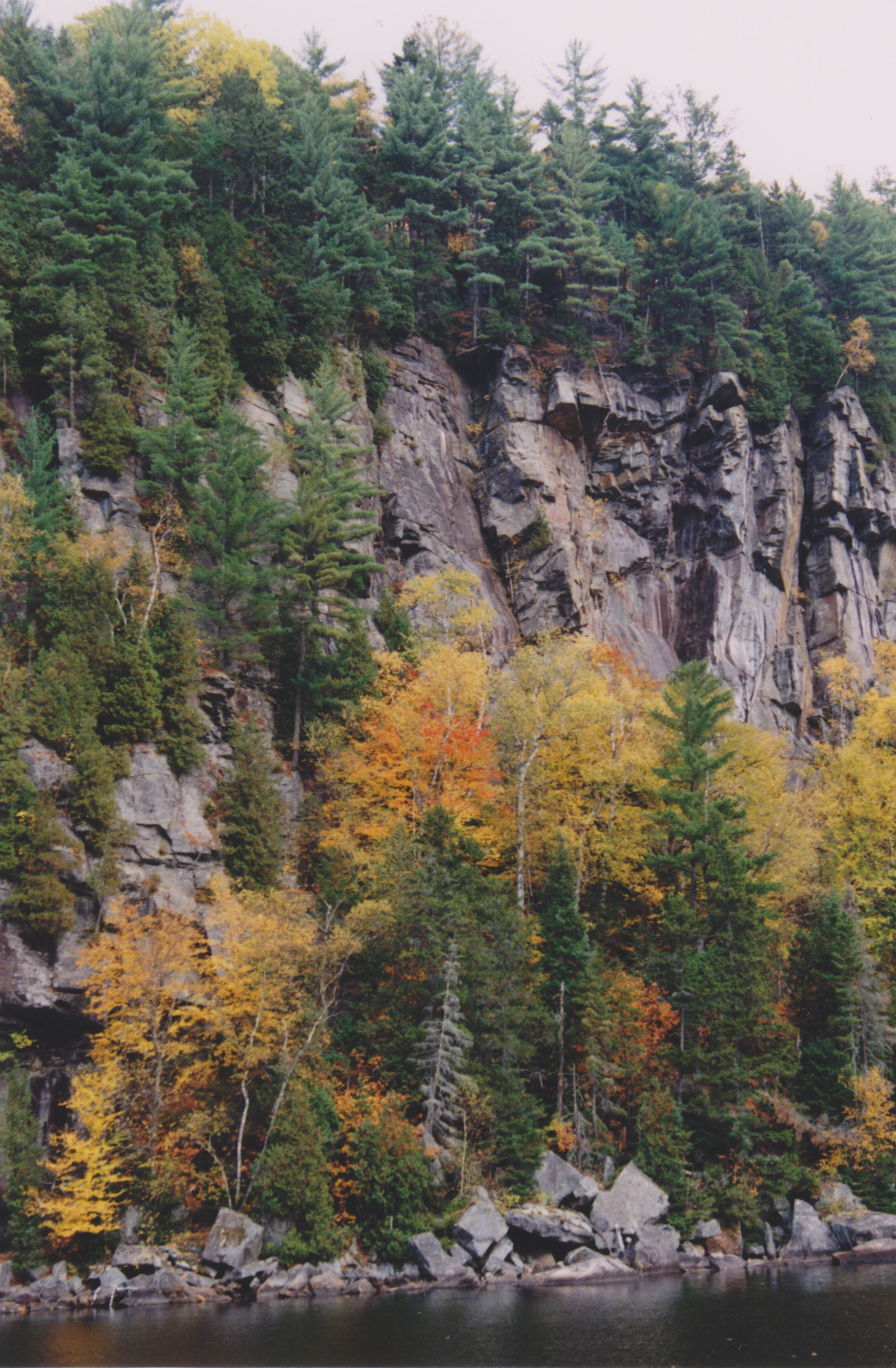
- Rock wall on the East bank, Chemin du lac Long, Saint-Alban
- Interactive map of Long Lake (Saint-Alban)
- Location: Saint-Alban, Portneuf Regional County Municipality, Capitale-Nationale, Quebec, Canada
- Coordinates: 46.83663°N 72.13902°W
- Lake type: Natural
- Primary outflows: Noire River
- Max. length: 3 km (1.9 mi)

Long Lake, Lac Long (French), is entirely located in Saint-Alban (Municipality), Portneuf RCM, Capitale-Nationale, Quebec, Canada.

== Geography ==
The lake is fully part of Portneuf Regional Natural Park.

With an area of 2.7 km2, the Long Lake (Saint-Alban) is the 2nd largest of the 840 lakes in the Sainte-Anne River watershed. Lakes Montauban, Pioui, Travers, aux Cèdres and Gros Lac belong to the Long Lake watershed.

As exceptional natural site, the Long Lake cliff, with a height of 65 to 100 meters, runs along the eastern shore of Long Lake for four km.

Long Lake Overview

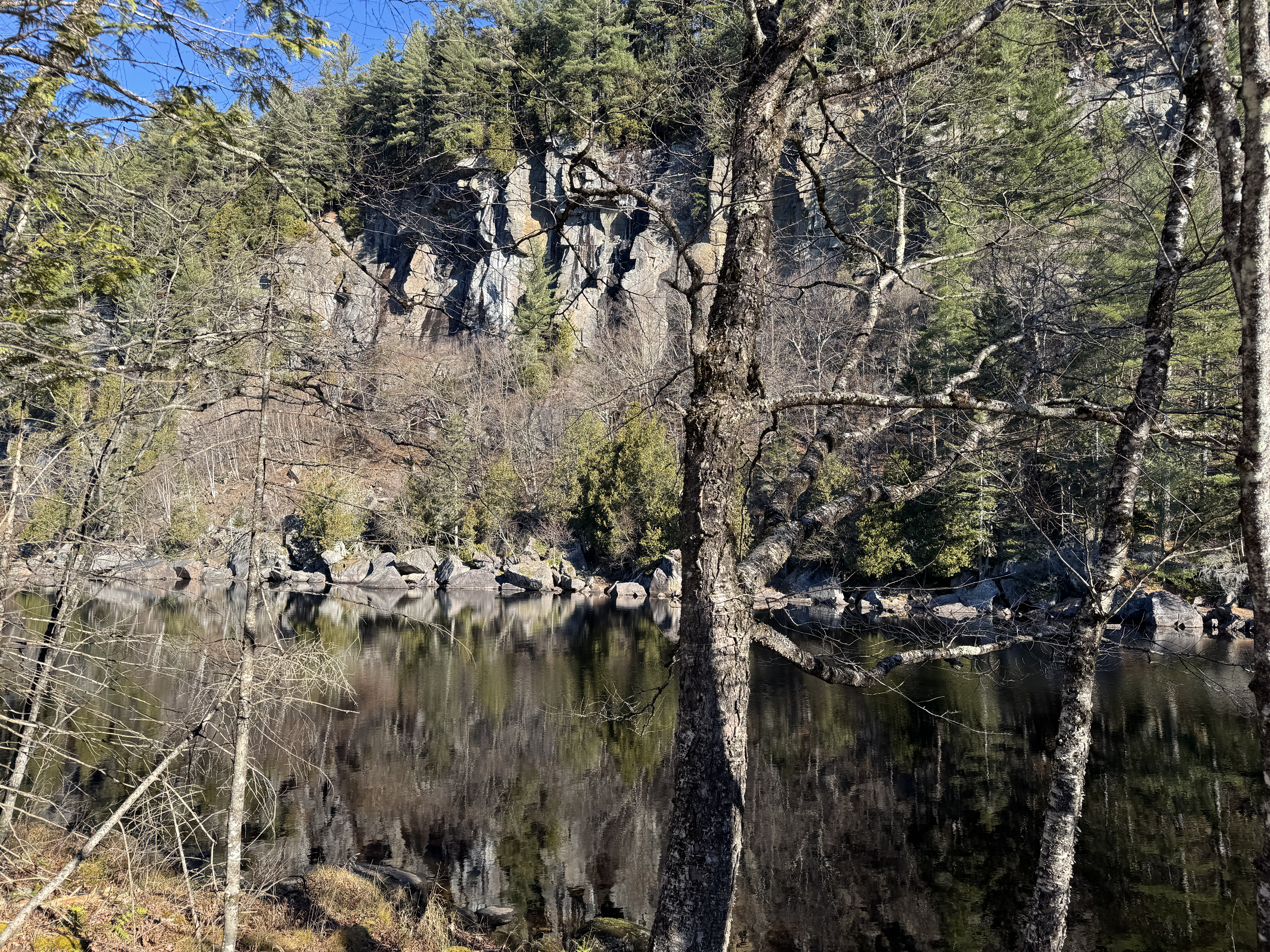
Scree slope at the foot of the clift of the bank

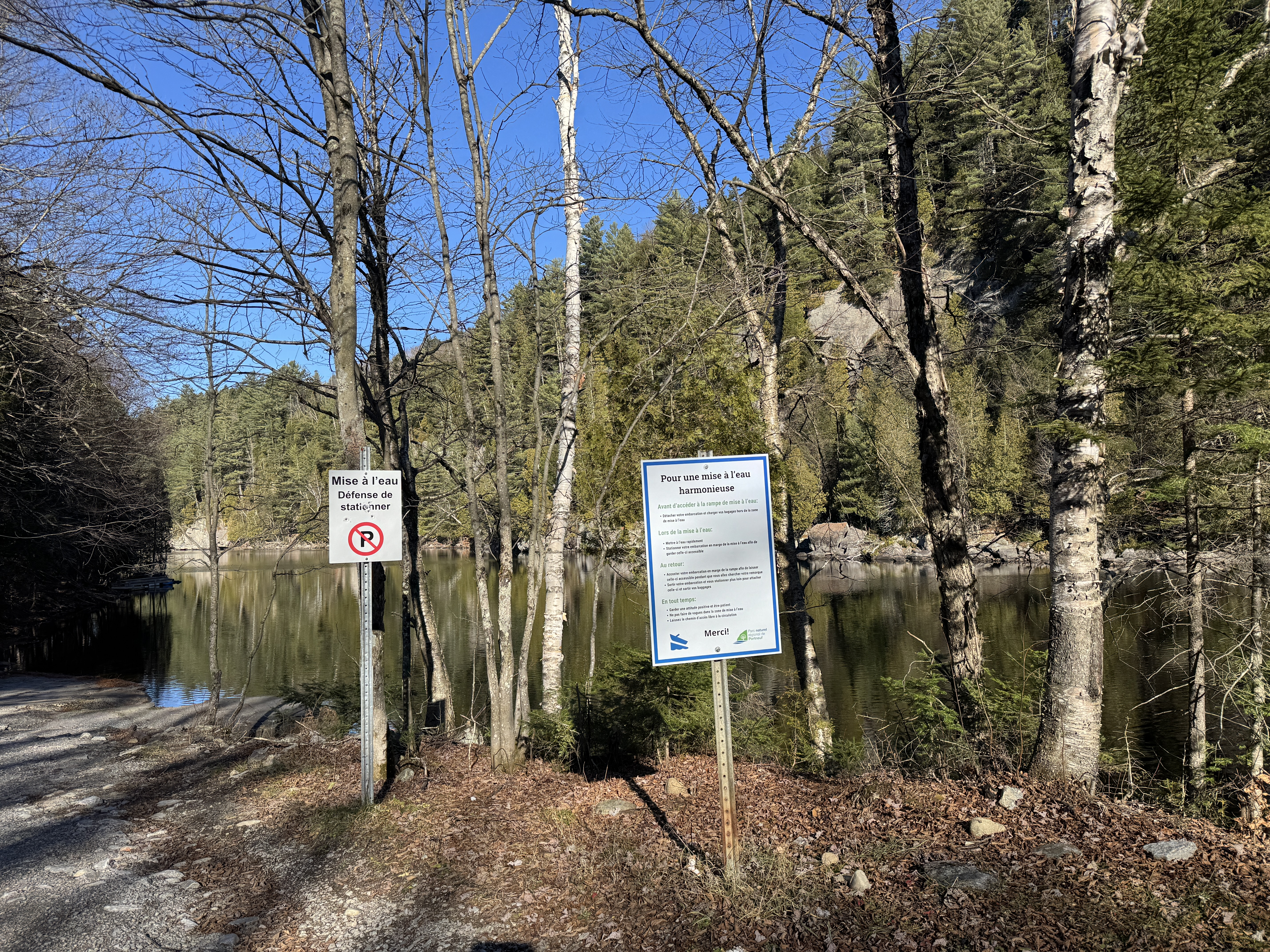
Launching, information: road signs on the West shore

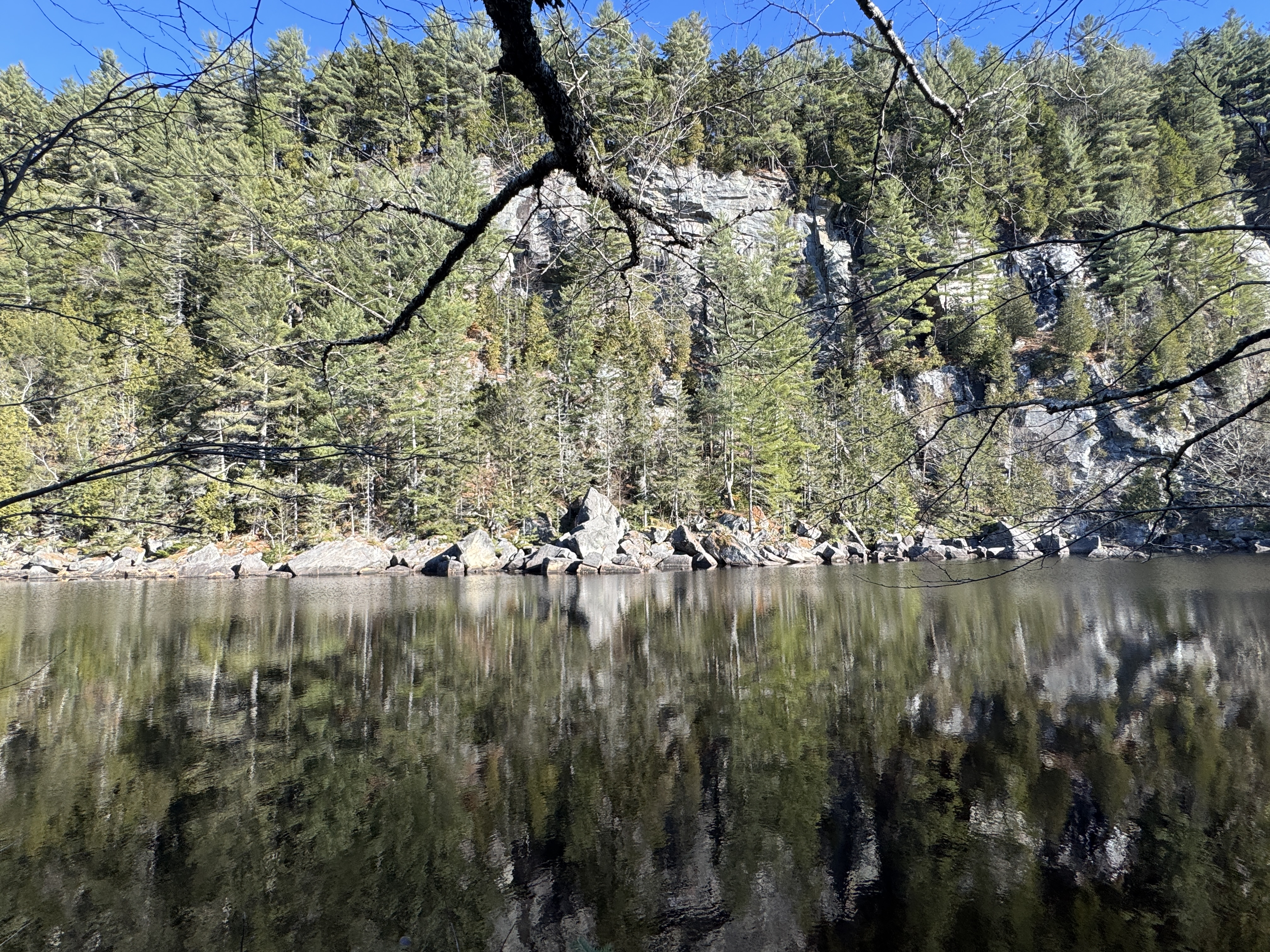
Cliff and scree slope on the East shore

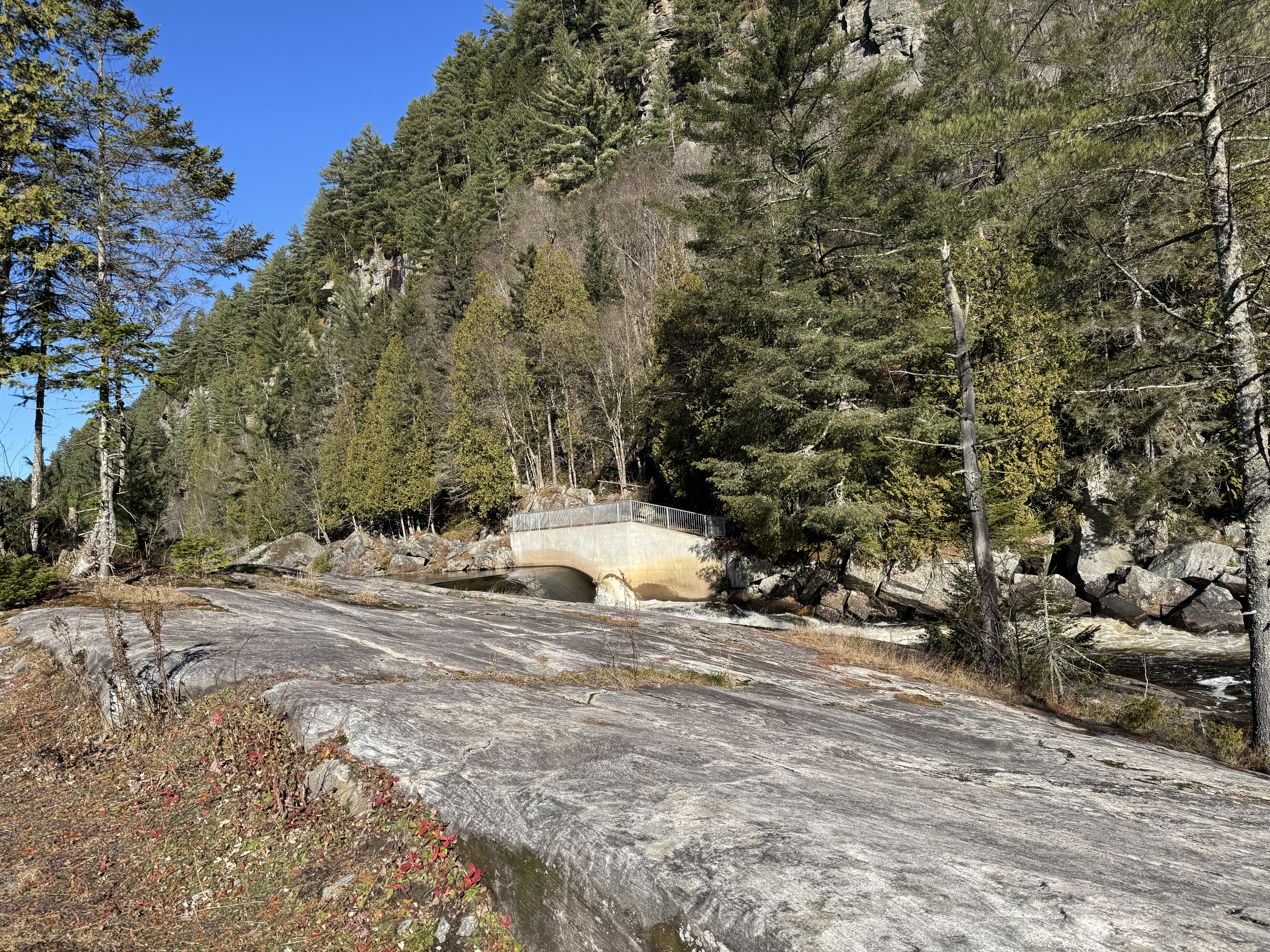
Jean-Noël Côté (1942-2007) Dam, outlet of Lac Long and Noire River (Sainte-Anne River tributary) (source)

== Aquatic Fauna ==
In the Portneuf Regional Natural Park, Long and Montauban lakes are recognized for lake trout fishing, the territory is located in hunting and fishing zone 27 defined by the Ministry of Forests, Wildlife and Parks which ensures the respect for the rules governing hunting and sport fishing.

- Arctic char
- Lake trout

In Long and Montauban Lakes, forage fish or (bait fish) include several individuals, inventory data from the Ministry of Natural Resources and Forests (Quebec) 2012 and CAPSA 2019

- Rainbow smelt
- Banded killifish
- Lake whitefish
- Golden shiner
- White sucker
- Creek chub
- Fallfish
- Yellow perch

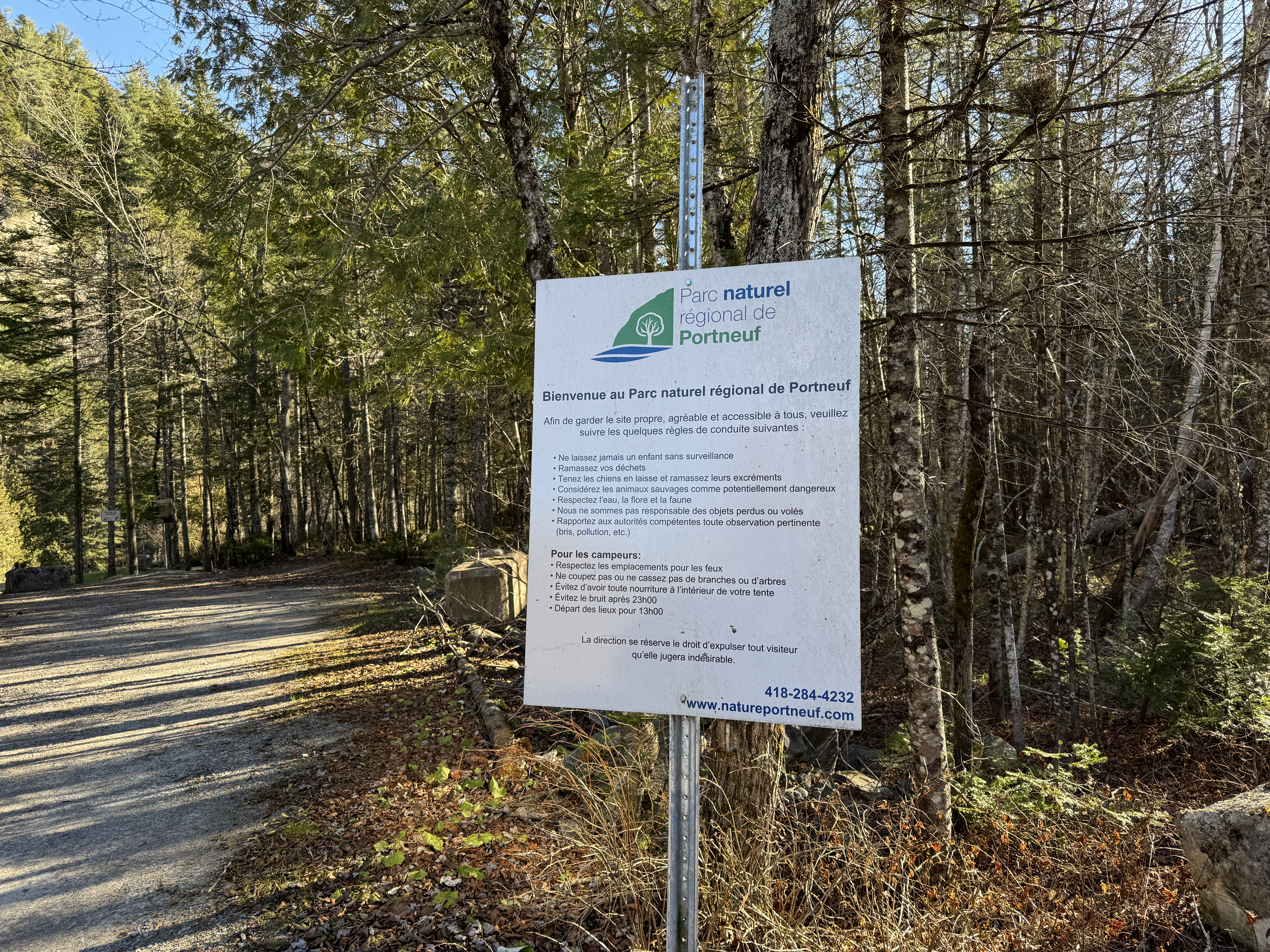
Portneuf regional Natural park, living together code and regulations, sign

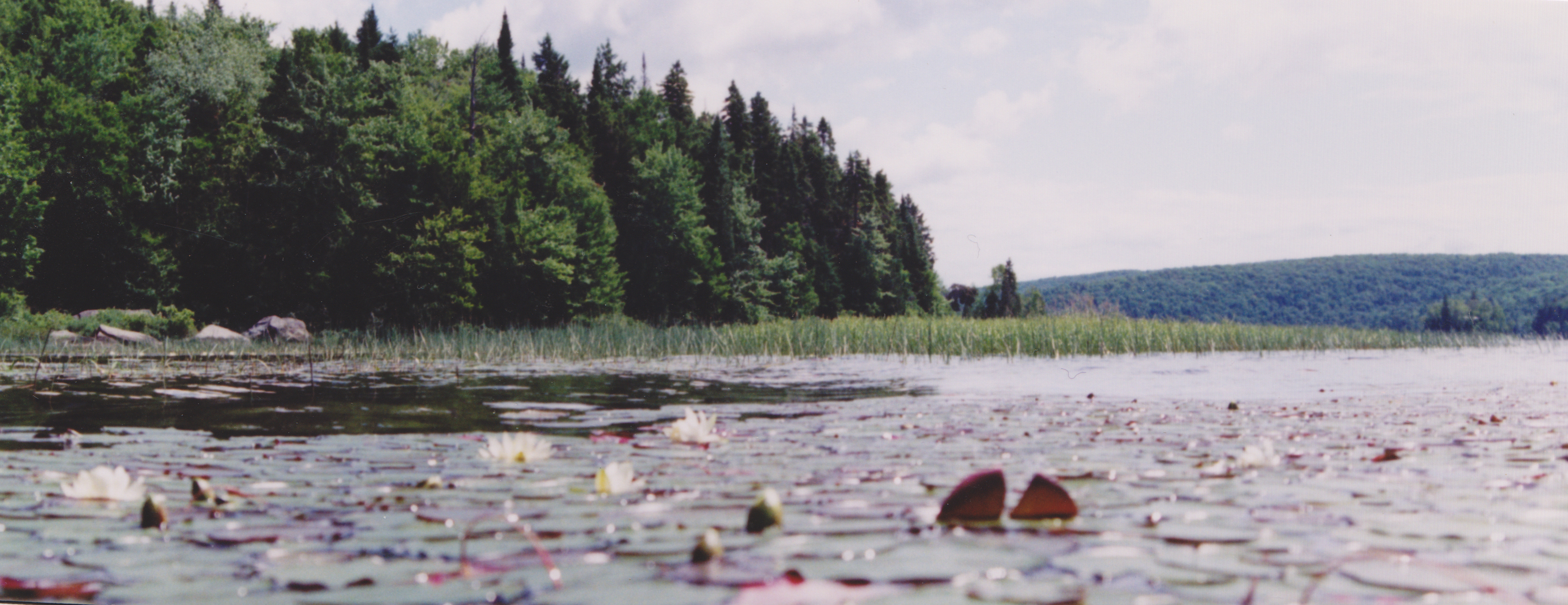
American white waterlily. Outlet between Montauban Lake and Lake Long, Rivière-à-Pierre

== Toponymy ==
More than 200 officially named geographic locations bear the name Long Lake. In indigenous languages the names Kinogami, Kachinukamach, Kachinuwayach, Takiyok also designate them to emphasize their lengthwise extent.

== See also ==
List of lakes of Canada
