= Montauban Lake =

Lake in Quebec, Canada

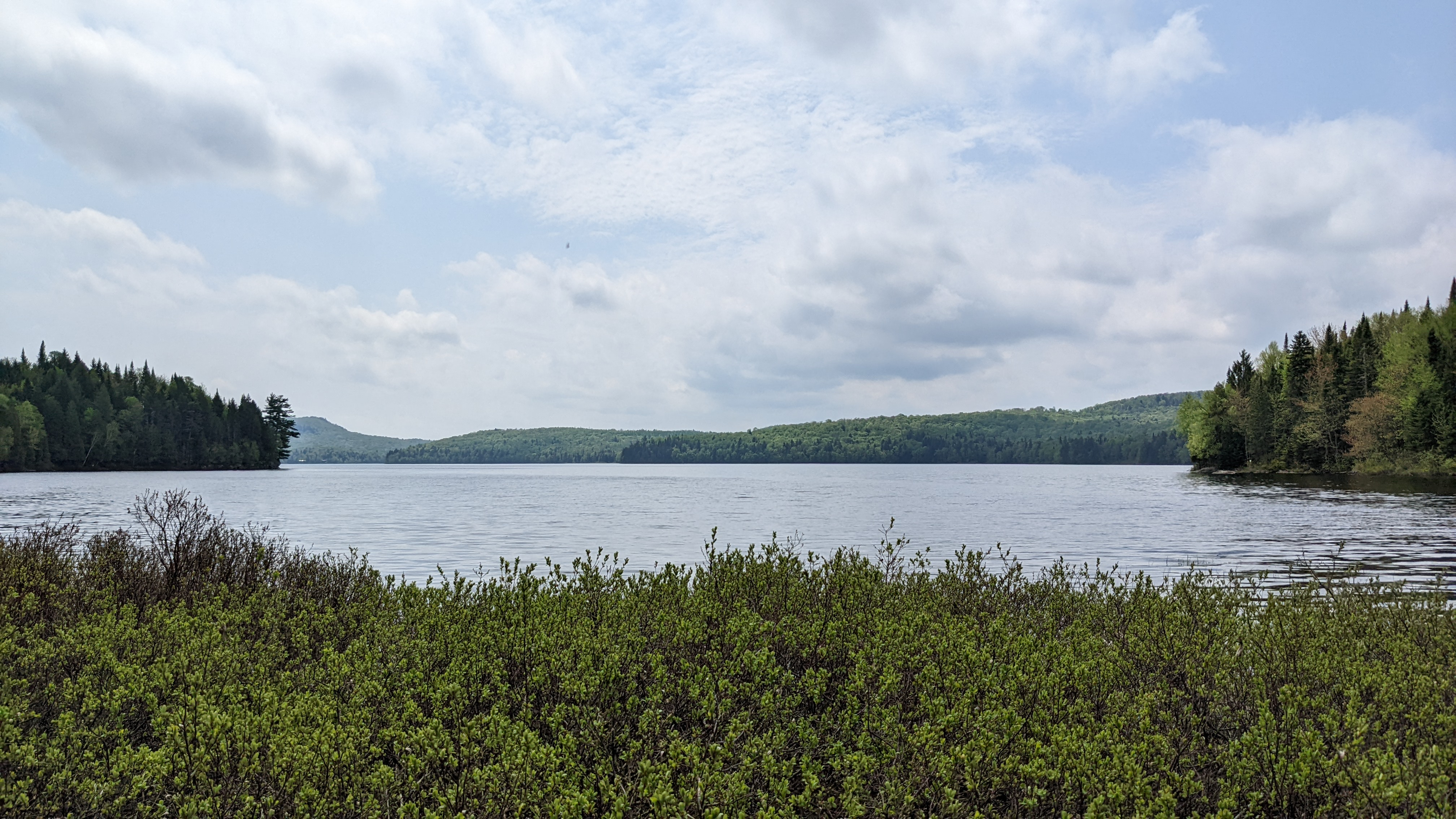

- Location in Quebec
- Location: Saint-Raymond, Portneuf Regional County Municipality, Capitale-Nationale
- Coordinates: 46.8533°N 72.1806°W
- Lake type: Natural
- Primary outflows: Noire River
- Basin countries: Canada
- Max. length: 6.3 km (3.9 mi)
- Max. width: 1.1 km (0.68 mi)
- Surface elevation: 176 m (577 ft)

Lake Montauban is located in the municipalities of Rivière-à-Pierre and Saint-Alban, Portneuf RCM, Capitale-Nationale, Quebec, Canada.

== Toponymy ==
The toponym "Lac Montauban" was recorded as of December 5, 1968 in Commission de toponymie du Québec.

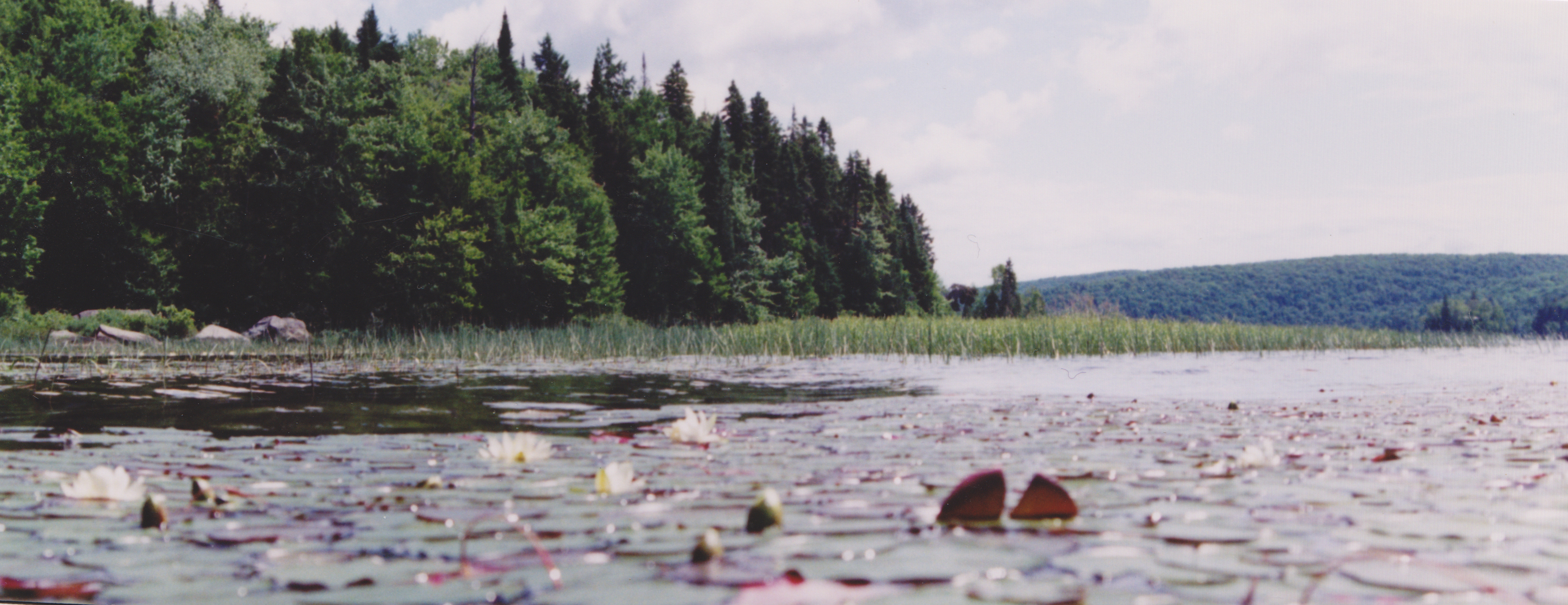
Nymphaea odorata Aiton. — Nymphéa odorant. — Nénuphar blanc, Lis d'eau. — (Common water-lily). Outlet between Montauban Lake and Long Lake_(Saint-Alban), Rivière-à-Pierre

The area around Lac Montauban is served on the east side by Chemin Antoine-François-Germain and Chemin du Gouverneur-Duquesne. Secondary forest roads serve the other parts. Forestry is the main economic activity in the sector; recreotourism activities, second.

== Aquatique fauna ==
In the Portneuf Regional Natural Park, Long and Montauban lakes are recognized for Lake trout fishing, the territory is located in hunting and fishing zone 27 defined by the Ministry of Forests, Wildlife and Parks which ensures the respect for the rules governing hunting and sport fishing.

- Salvelinus namaycush (Walbaum, 1792). —Touladi, Truite grise, Truite de lac . — Lake trout, Lake charr).

In Long and Montauban Lakes, forage fish or (bait fish) include several individuals, inventory data from the Ministry of Natural Resources and Forests (Quebec) 2012 and CAPSA 2019

- Osmerus mordax (Mitchill, (1814). — Éperlan arc-en-ciel. — (Rainbow smelt).
- Fundulus diaphanus Lesueur, (1817). — Fondule barré. — (Banded killifish).
- Coregonus clupeaformis (Mitchill, 1818). — Grand corégone, Corégone, Poisson blanc, Pointu, Corégone de lac. — (Lake whitefish, Great akes whitefish, Common Whitefish).
- Notemigonus crysoleucas (Mitchill, 1814). — Méné jaune — (Golden shiner).
- Catostomus commersonii (Lacepède, 1803). — Meunier noir. — (White sucker)l
- Semotilus atromaculatus (Mitchill 1818). — Mulet à cornes. — (Creek chub)
- Semotilus corporalis Mitchill (1817). — Ouitouche, Poisson blanc, Mulet. — (Fallfish, American Chub, Chivin, Corporal, Dace, Mohawk, Pennsylvania Giant Chub, Rough-nosed Chub, Shining Dace, Silver Chub, Windfish).
- Perca flavescens (Mitchill, 1814). — Perchaude. — (Yellow Perch).

== See also ==
- Portneuf Regional County Municipality (MRC)
- Saint-Alban
- Portneuf Regional Natural Park
- Noire River
