= Trou du Diable =

Cave in Quebec, Canada

Coordinates: 46.67°N 72.09°W

- Devil's Hole
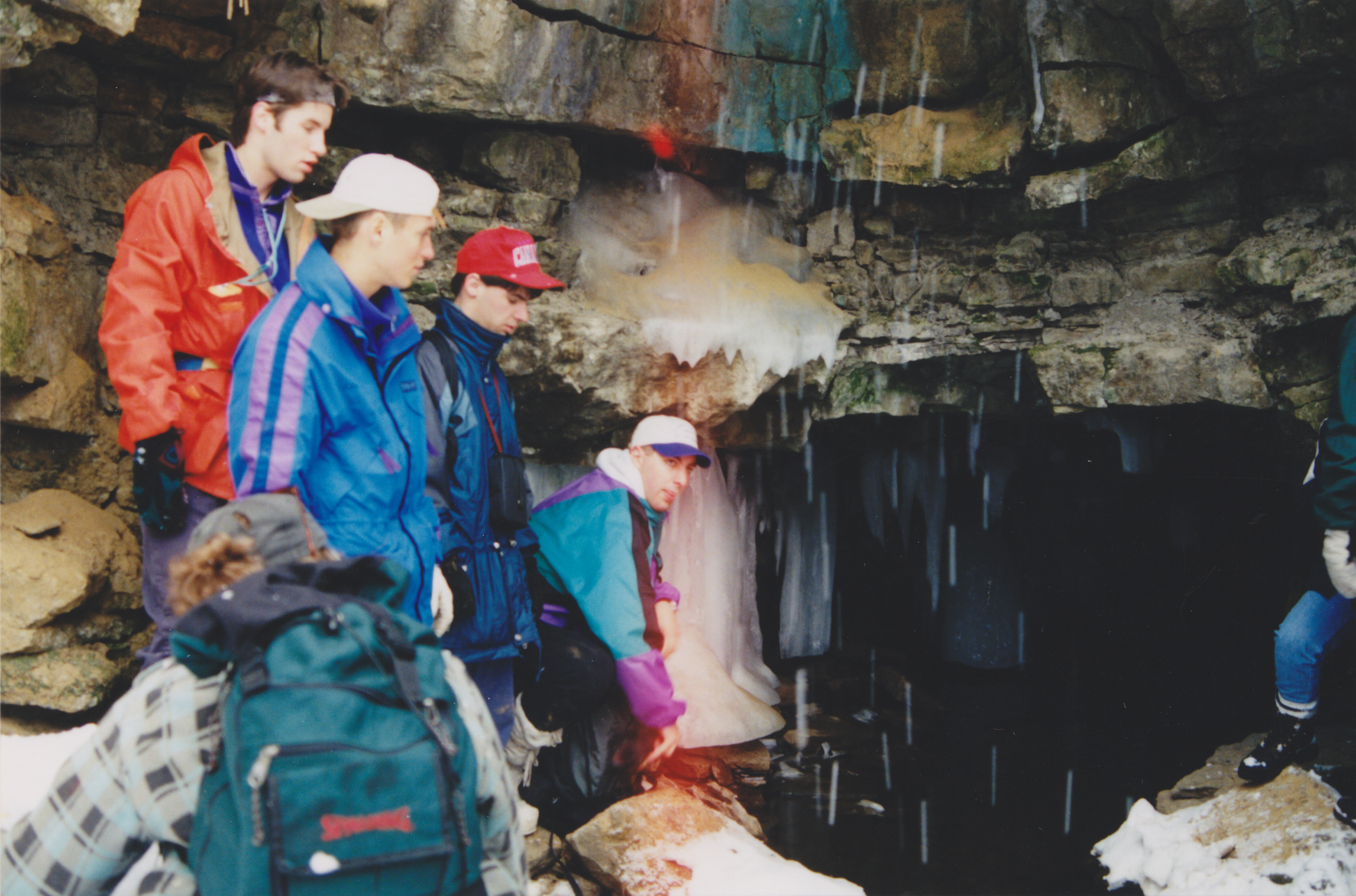
- Geology field lessons, downstream entrance to the cave, Saint-Casimir, Quebec
- Interactive map of Trou du Diable
- Geology: Karsts in Eastern Canada
- Access: Quebec Speleology Society
- Website: https://parcportneuf.com/grotte-trou-du-diable/

Trou du Diable (French pronunciation: [tʁu dy djabl], Devil's Hole) is a cave situated in Portneuf Regional Natural Park, in Saint-Casimir, Quebec, Canada.

== Speleology ==
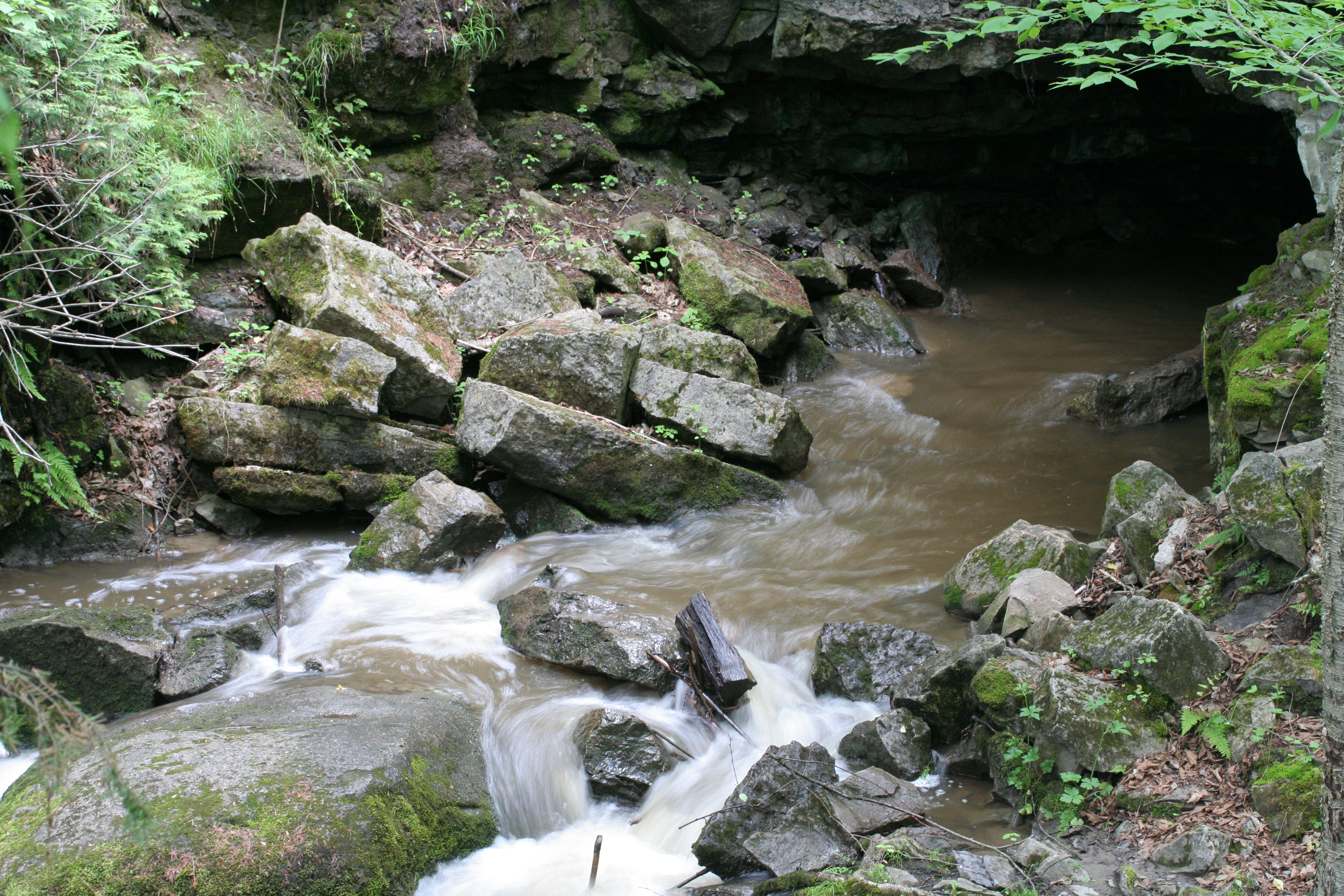
Resurgence of the small, unnamed watercourse near its mouth in the Sainte-Anne River

Speleology and caving are the study and exploration of caves. Caution is required, as caves are dangerous places which carry risks of serious injury or even death. The Trou du Diable cave is only accessible by guided tours offered by the Portneuf Regional Natural Park.

The underground cave environment is a natural laboratory for caving, geomorphology, geology, biology, climatology and other disciplines.

The Trou du Diable is the second-largest cave in Quebec, with a little over a kilometer of underground galleries, it is located east of the village of Saint-Casimir.

The cave features a network of dry galleries, the most typical of which is the pot gallery with forms of vortex erosion. Certain parts of the cave have vast dimensions. Within the cave, underground tributaries join the main channel. The concretions are mediocre, which testifies to the significance of dissolution action.

Saint-Casimir Devil's Hole Cave (Trou du Diable)

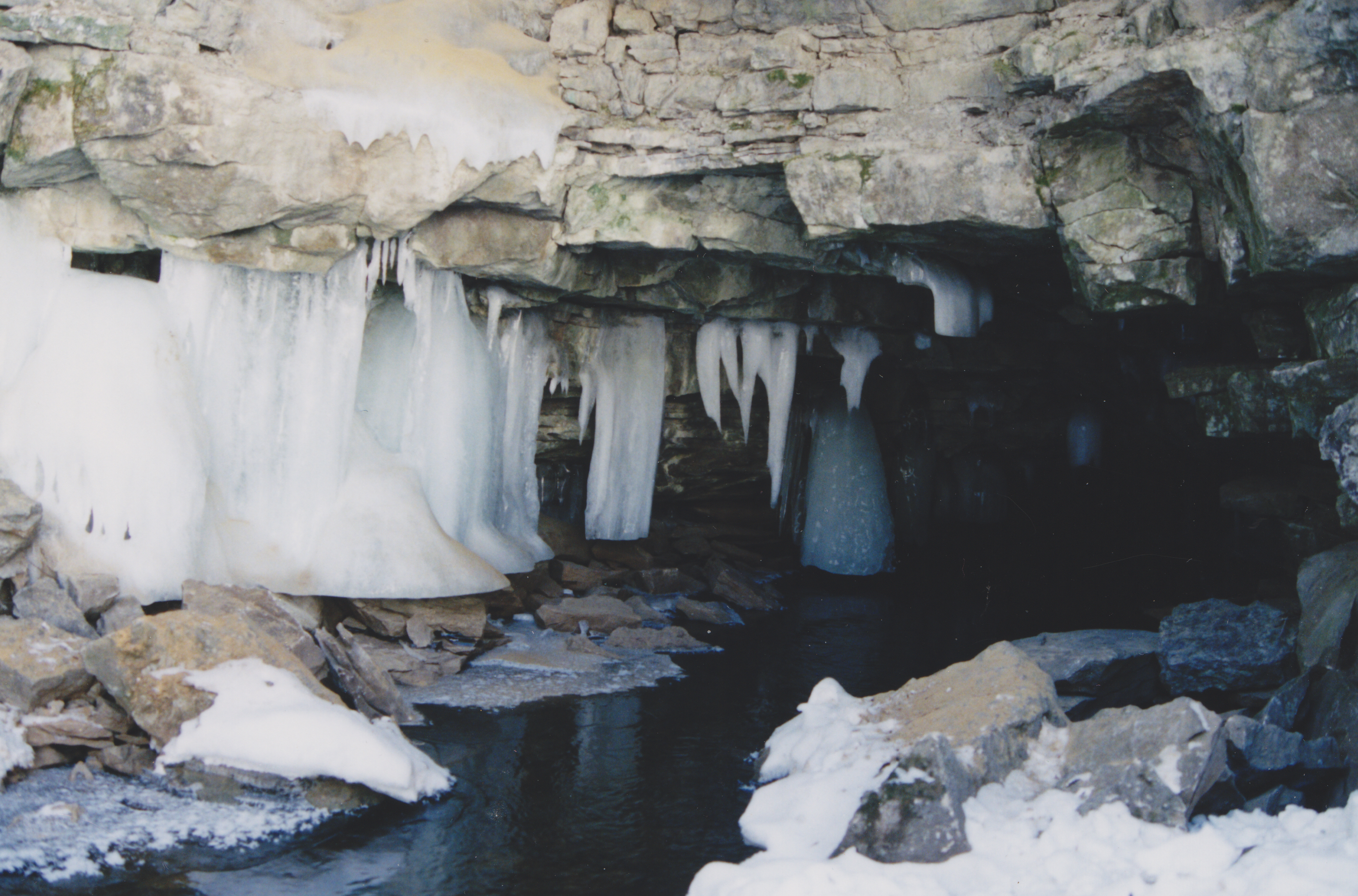
Downstream exit of the (unnamed) stream and the cave

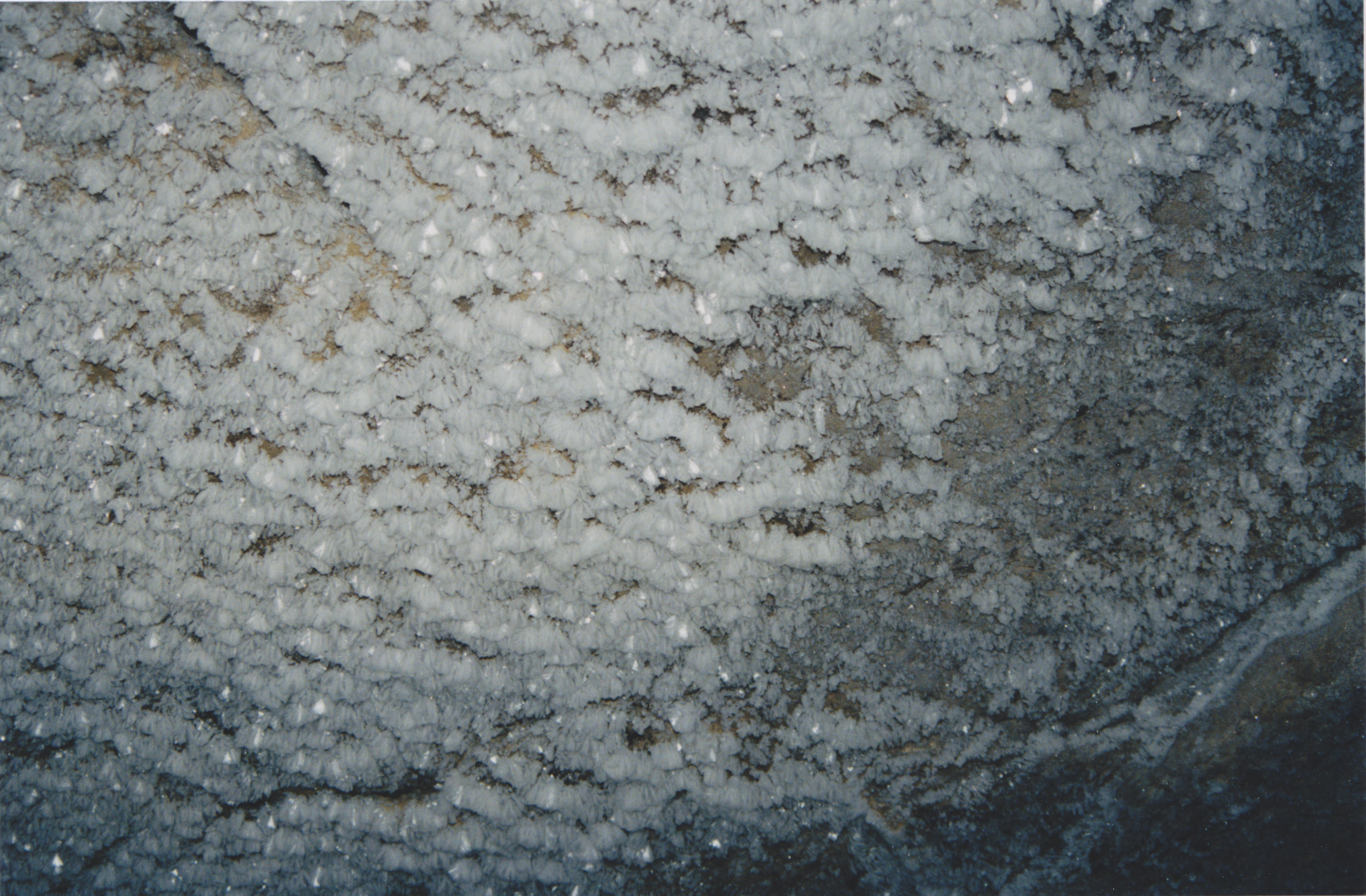
February icy vault in the cave

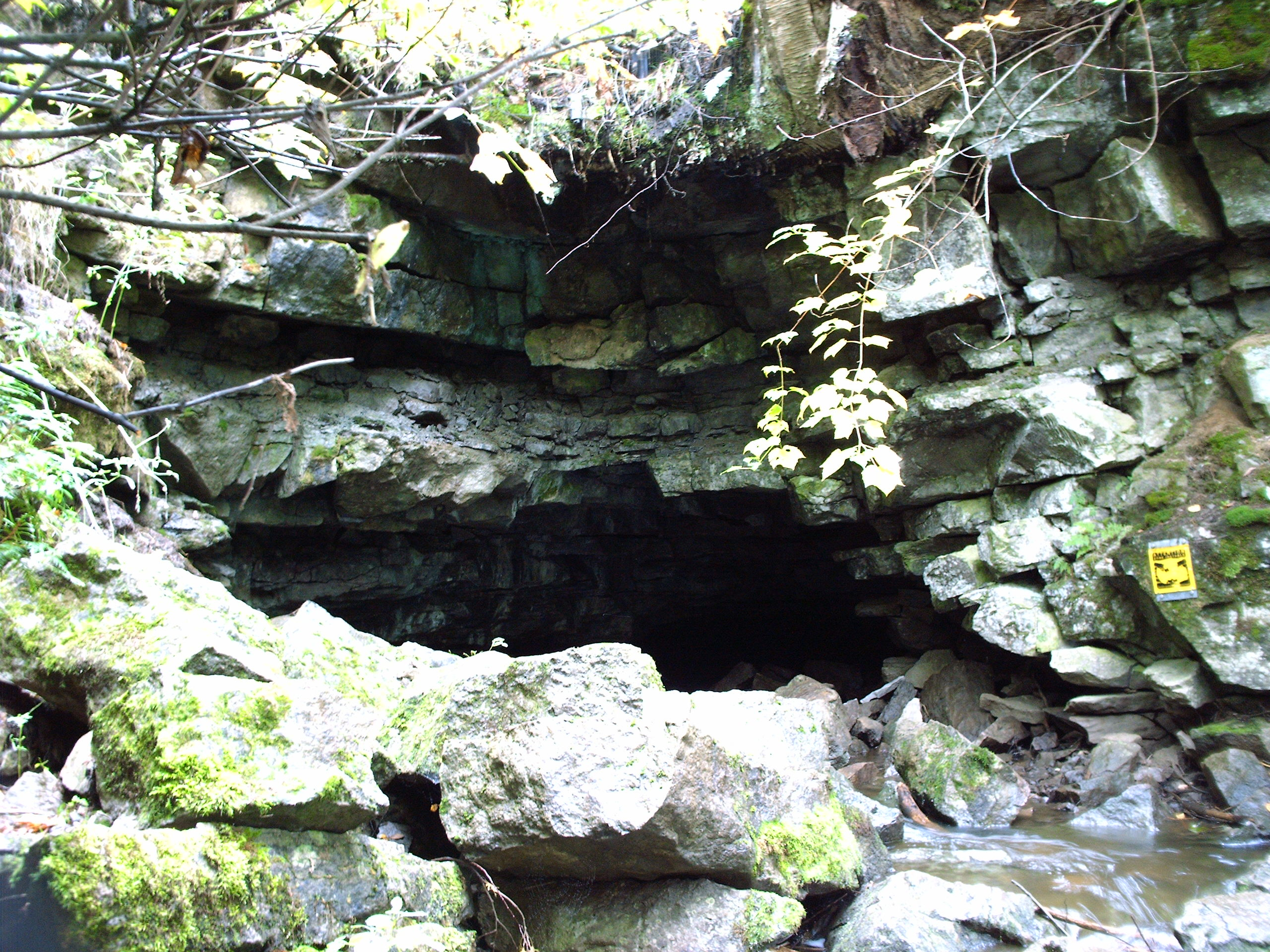
Trou du Diable entrance

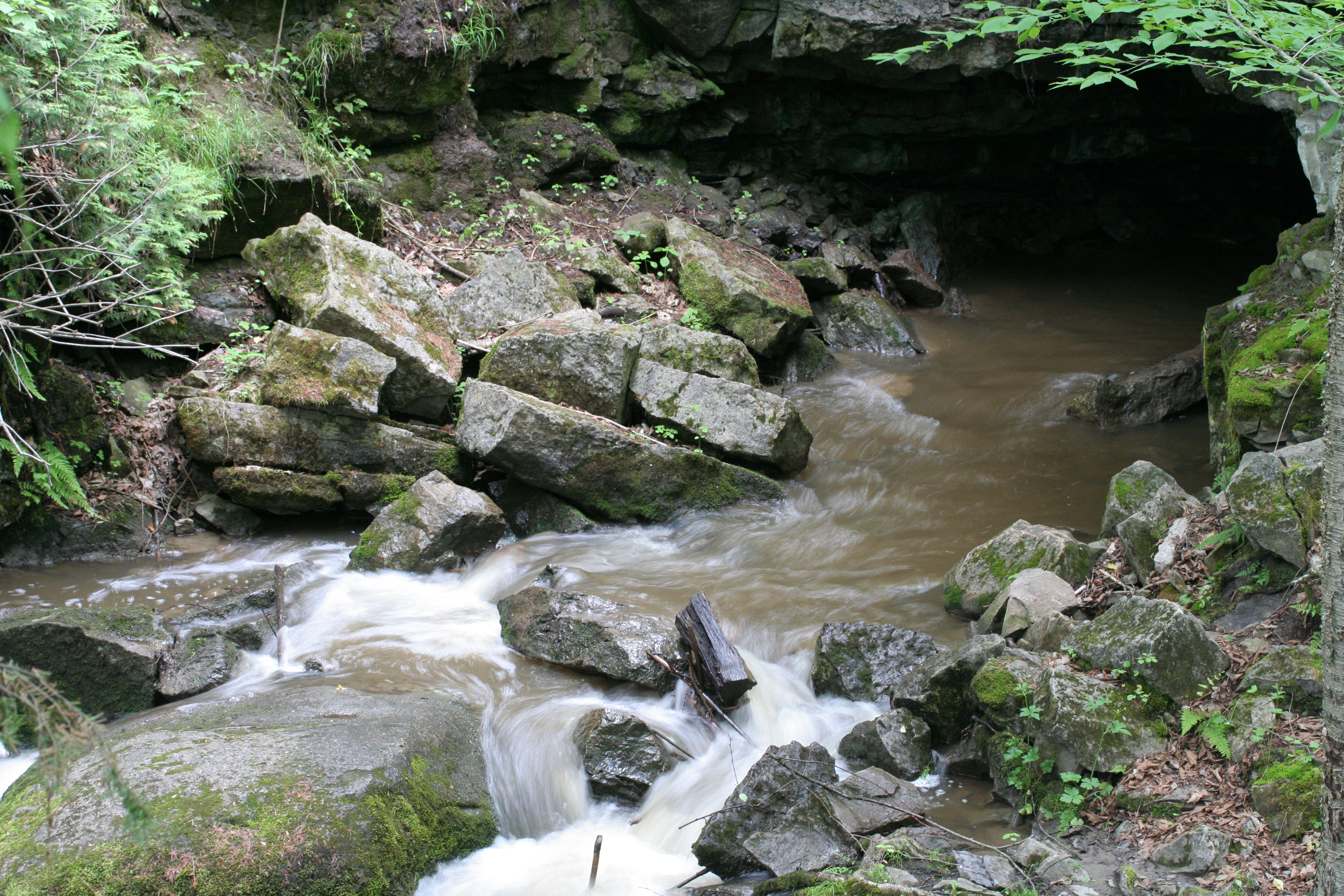
Unnamed tributary of the Sainte-Anne River at the cave exit, a few meters from its mouth
Limestone wall at the downstream outlet

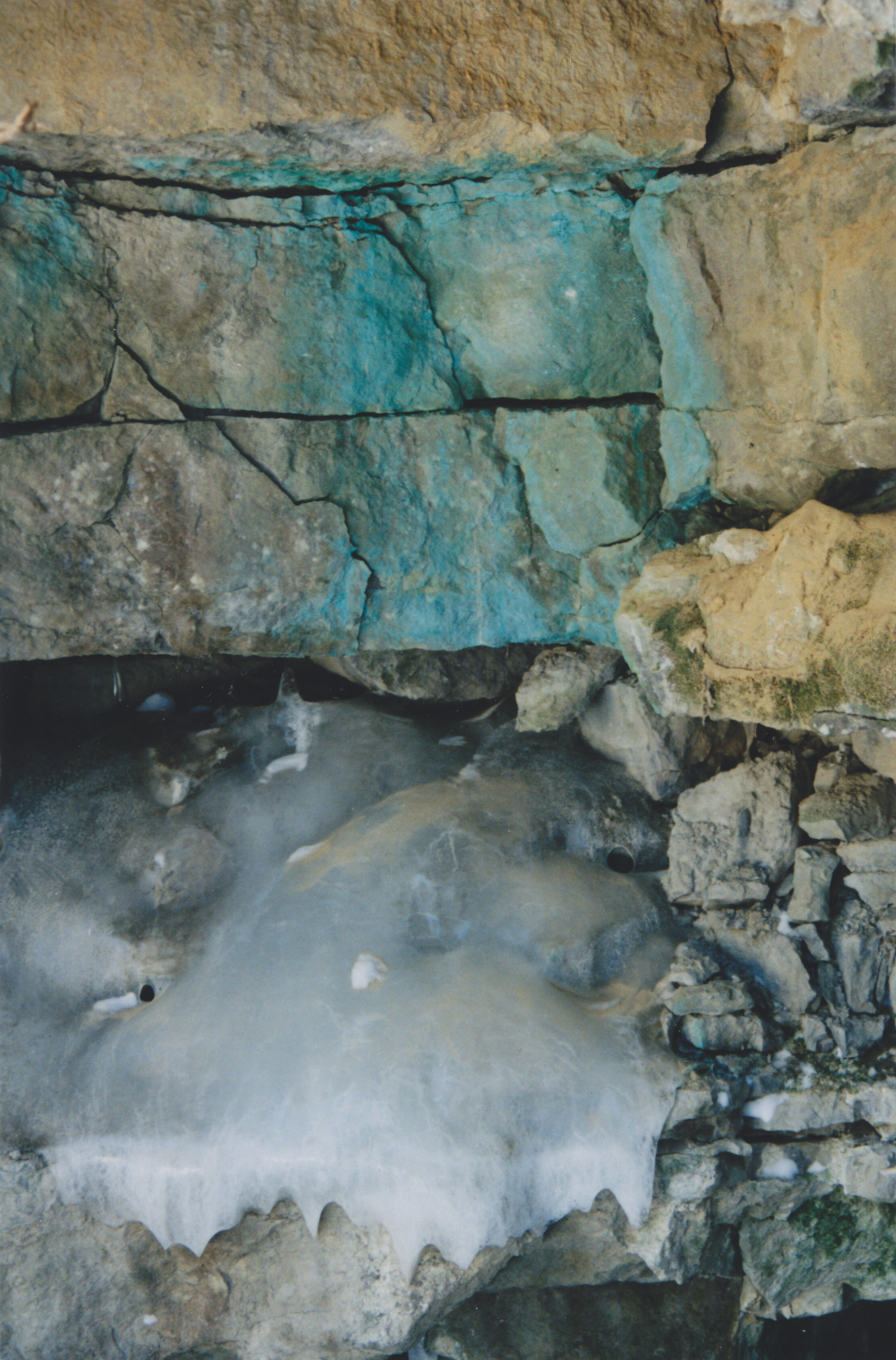
February 1995

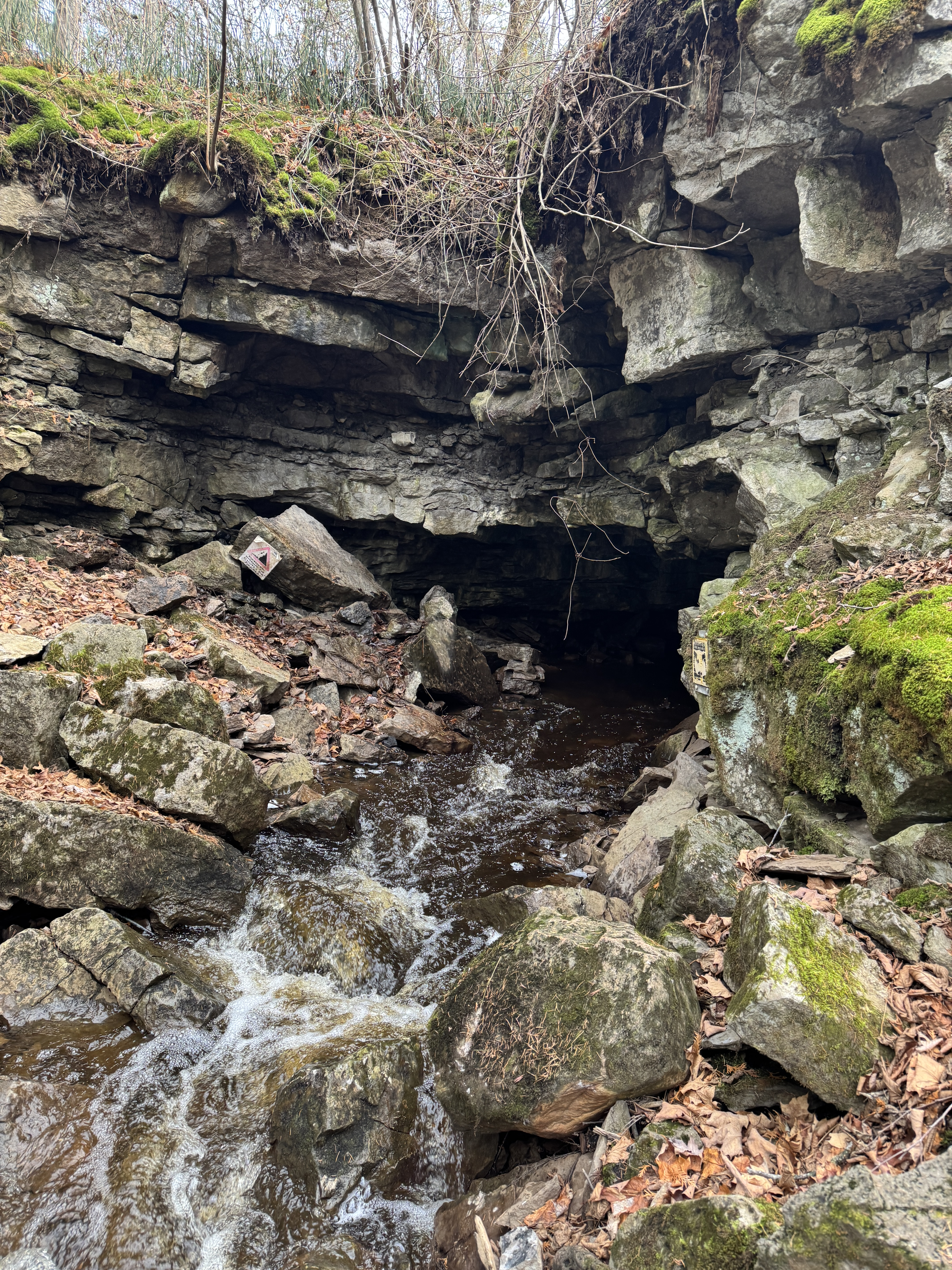
November 2024

== Folklore ==
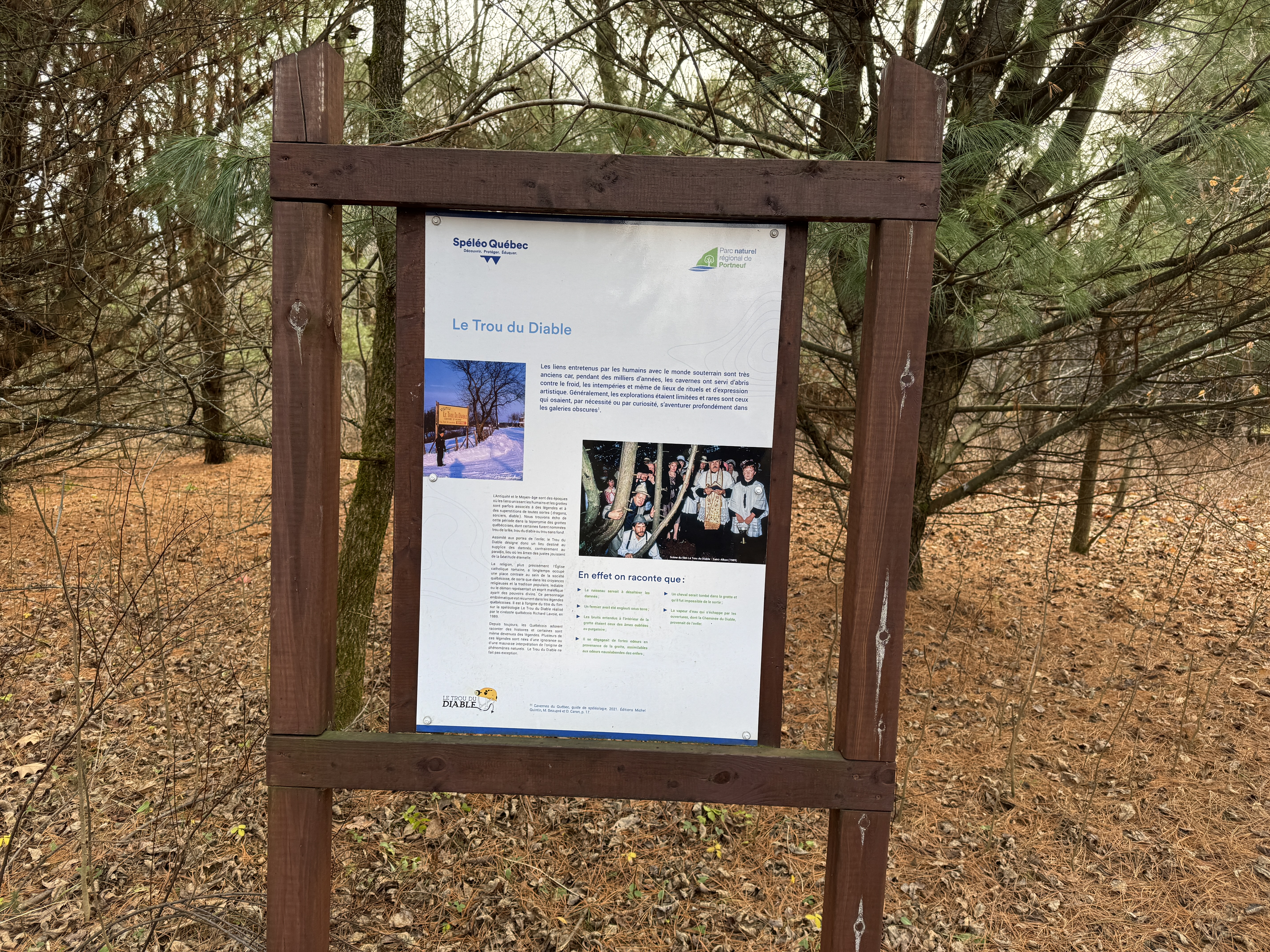
Information panel at the Saint-Casimir Trou du Diable Interpretation Center

Caves are often associated with legends and superstitions of all kinds. Dragons, sorcerers and devils are believed to like the Quebec caves called Fairy Hole, Devil's Hole, and Bottomless Hole. Of Devil's Hole cave, it is said that:

- The stream is used to quench the thirst of the damned.
- The noises heard inside the cave are those of souls forgotten in purgatory.
- The water vapor escaping through the openings, including the Devil's chimney, comes from hell.

It is also said that:

When New France was discovered, people thought they had found a virgin continent, an earthly paradise, a place where malevolent minds had not set foot. ...

Rather, [the Devil] had taken refuge on this land, enjoying a place where he could take some time off, telling himself that the most prosecuted entity of this world certainly deserved this perfect sanctuary. This is how the Devil found a home in an endless cavern, at the base of a waterfall where he was sheltered by an immense and eternal whirlpool. There he found tranquility and peace, as well as a place where he could drink and feast without being disturbed.

Sometimes he even allowed himself to torment some poor, lost souls who had the misfortune of falling into the waterfall. ...

They called that place 'The Den of Evil Manitous'. Later, it was named the 'Trou du Diable', meaning the Devil's den. People said it would forever imprison those who fell into it. The Iroquois threw into it the remains of Father Buteux.
