= Saint-Alban, Quebec =

Saint-Alban
- Municipality
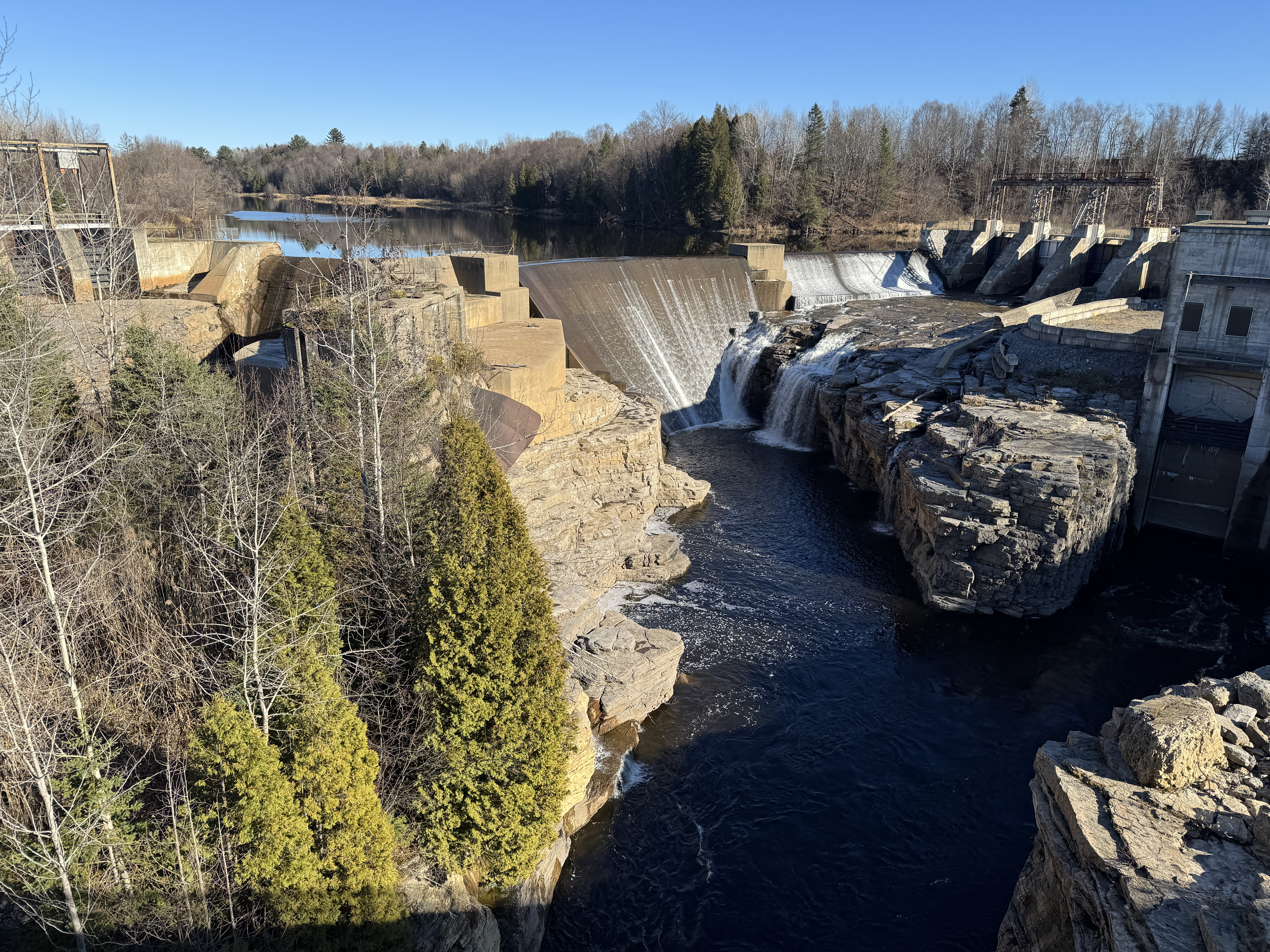
- Sainte-Anne River, Saint-Alban Dam, from François-Naud Bridge

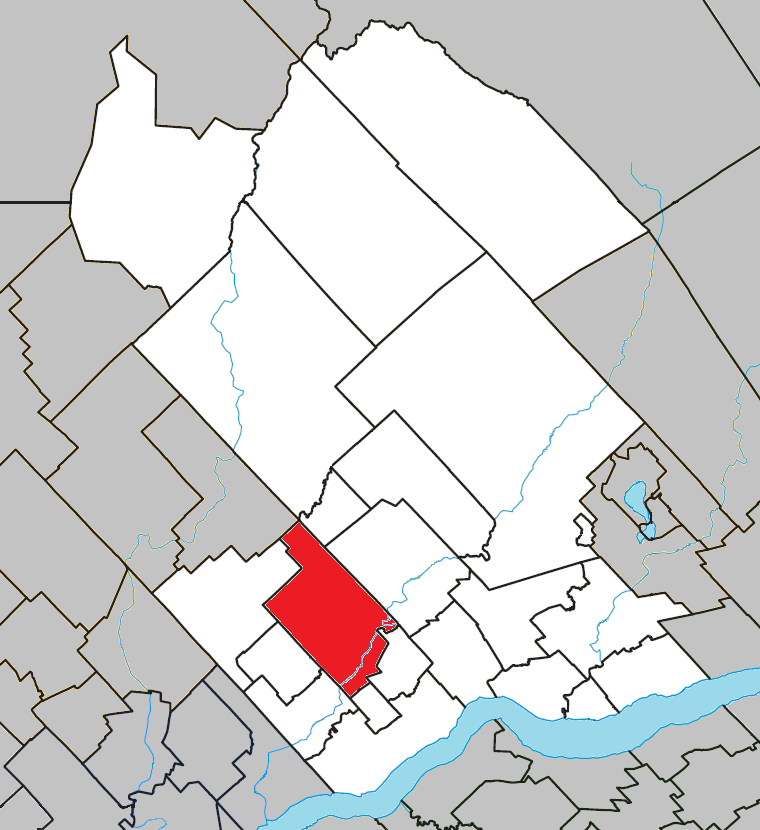
- Location within Portneuf RCM

- Location in central Quebec
- Coordinates: 46°43′05″N 72°04′39″W
- Country: Canada
- Province: Quebec
- Region: Capitale-Nationale
- RCM: Portneuf
- Settled: 1830
- Constituted: December 31, 1991

Government
  - Mayor: Deny Lépine
  - Fed. riding: Saint-Augustin—Portneuf—Jacques-Cartier
  - Prov. riding: Portneuf

Area
  - Total: 159.74 km^{2} (61.68 sq mi)
  - Land: 148.47 km^{2} (57.32 sq mi)

Population (2021)
  - Total: 1,196
  - Density: 8.1/km^{2} (21/sq mi)
  - Pop (2016-21): ▼0.2%
  - Dwellings: 764
- Time zone: UTC−05:00 (EST)
  - Summer (DST): UTC−04:00 (EDT)
- Postal code(s): G0A 3B0
- Area codes: 367, 418, 581
- Highways: R-354
- Website: st-alban.qc.ca (in French)

Saint-Alban (French pronunciation: [sɛ̃t‿albɑ̃]) is a municipality located in Portneuf RCM, Capitale-Nationale region, Quebec, Canada.

The municipality is crossed in its southern part by the Sainte-Anne River (Les Chenaux).

== History ==
More or less from 1830 to 1840, the abundance of forests and the presence of lakes, such as Clair, Long and Montauban, the Noire and Blanche rivers, and numerous streams, attracted the first settlers to the territory south and north of the Sainte-Anne River.

The new arrivals came from Lorette and the neighboring parishes of Deschambault, Grondines and Sainte-Anne-de-la-Pérade. Oral tradition attributes the founding of Saint-Alban, in 1829 or 1930, to François Naud from Deschambault. The first colonized sector was located in the Noire River range. The bridge over the Sainte-Anne River facilitated the development of the northern sector. This bridge was located approximately at the current location of the François-Naud bridge.

Francois Naud - In 1829, this young man from the second row of Deschambault would be the first to pass on the lands located north of the Sainte-Anne River after felling a long spruce (Picea glauca (Moench) Voss.) tree, which fell across the river, and which served as a bridge to cross to the other side. In 1830, three or four other spruces were thrown next to the first; they were covered with pieces of logs and this was the first bridge.

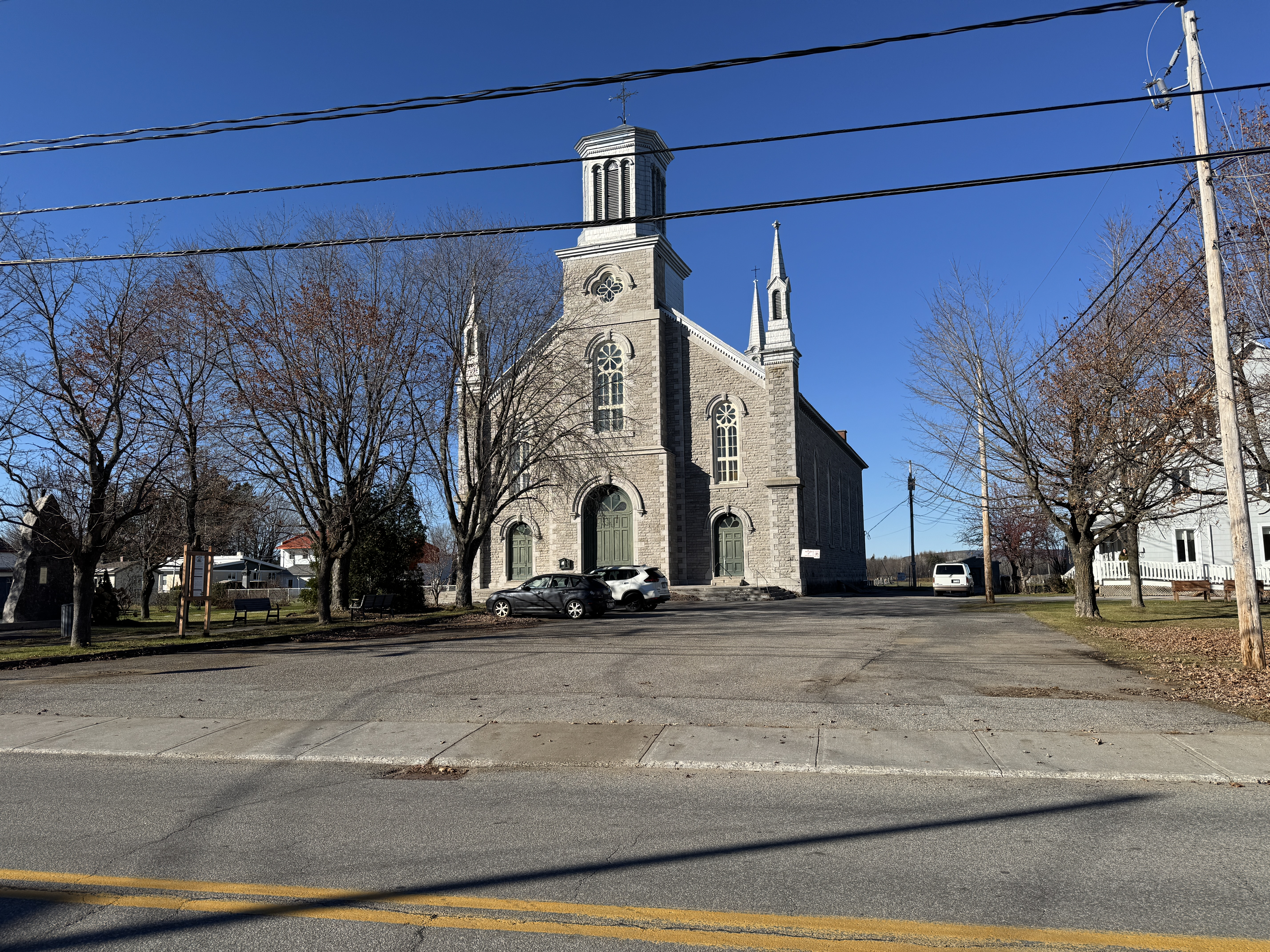
Catholic church of the Sacred Heart of Jesus parish, Principale street

The first settlers began clearing the area around 1830. In 1851, a mill was built that led to the development of the village. In 1856, the parish was founded, followed by the post office in 1857, and the parish municipality in 1860. Its official full name was Saint-Alban-d'Alton, and named after Saint Alban, the first martyr in Britain in the third century. Alton refers to its location in the geographic township of Alton, formed in 1841, and named after a town in Hampshire, England.

In January 1918, the village centre separated from the parish municipality and was incorporated as the Village Municipality of Saint-Alban. In 1991, the parish and village municipalities merged again to form the new Municipality of Saint-Alban.

=== 1894 Landslide ===
On 27 April 1894, Canada's largest known landslide occurred in Saint-Alban. Displacing 185 million cubic metres (242 million cubic yards) of rock and dirt, it made a 40-metre (130 ft) deep mark that covered 4.6 million square metres (1,100 acres).

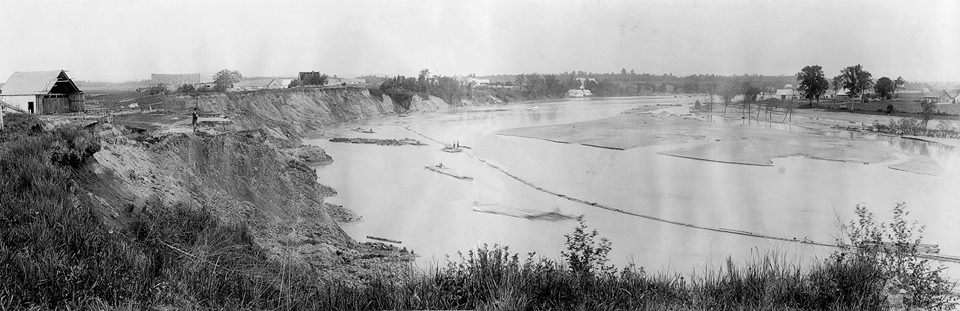
Noire River (Rivière Noire), Saint-Alban landslide 1894

== Geography ==
With a total area of 159.58 km2, the municipality of Saint-Alban occupies third place in the territory of the RCM of Portneuf.

The presence of Long Lake (Saint-Alban), Caribou, Noir, Trout, Anguille lakes and part of Clair lake (Sainte-Christine-d'Auvergne) are popular with vacationers and fishermen. In addition of Sainte-Anne River and several secondary watercourses, such as the Noire River (Sainte-Anne River tributary) and Blanche River (Saint-Casimir), bypass or cross the dairy farms, fields and forests.

In the Sainte-Anne River gorges sector of the Portneuf Regional Natural Park, the dominant forest species are white cedar, aspen, balsam fir and white spruce.

== Demographics ==
=== Population ===
Canada census – Saint-Alban community profile

	2021	2016	2011
Population	1,196 (-0.2% from 2016)	1,198 (-2.2% from 2011)	1,225 (+7.6% from 2006)
Land area	148.47 km^{2} (57.32 sq mi)	149.04 km^{2} (57.54 sq mi)	149.53 km^{2} (57.73 sq mi)
Population density	8.1/km^{2} (21/sq mi)	8.0/km^{2} (21/sq mi)	8.2/km^{2} (21/sq mi)
Median age	53.2 (M: 53.6, F: 52.4)	51.1 (M: 52.1, F: 50.7)	49.2 (M: 49.9, F: 48.0)
Private dwellings	776 (total) 582 (occupied)	737 (total)	764 (total)
Median household income	$61,600	$49,344	$42,282

References: 2021 2016 2011

Historical census populations – Saint-Alban

Year	Pop.	±%
1996	1,159	—
2001	1,170	+0.9%
2006	1,138	−2.7%

Year	Pop.	±%
2011	1,225	+7.6%
2016	1,198	−2.2%
2021	1,196	−0.2%

Source: Statistics Canada

=== Language ===
Canada Census Mother Tongue - Saint-Alban, Quebec
Census	Total	French			English			French & English			Other		
Year	Responses	Count	Trend	Pop %	Count	Trend	Pop %	Count	Trend	Pop %	Count	Trend	Pop %
2021	1,195	1,180	▼0.8%	98.7%	5	▲ n/a%	0.4%	5	▲ n/a%	0.4%	10	0.0%	0.8%
2016	1,200	1,190	▼1.7%	99.2%	0	▼100.0%	0.0%	0	0.0%	0.0%	10	▲100.0%	0.8%
2011	1,215	1,210	▲7.6%	99.6%	5	▲ n/a%	0.4%	0	0.0%	0.0%	5	▲ n/a%	0.4%
2006	1,125	1,125	▼2.6%	100.0%	0	▼100.0%	0.0%	0	0.0%	0.0%	0	0.0%	0.0%
2001	1,160	1,155	0.0%	99.6%	10	▼33.3%	0.9%	0	0.0%	0.0%	0	0.0%	0.0%
1996	1,175	1,155	n/a	98.3%	15	n/a	1.3%	0	n/a	0.0%	0	n/a	0.0%

== Government ==
List of former mayors since formation of current municipality:

- Deny Lépine (...–2005)
- Lynn Audet (2005–2013)
- Bernard Naud (2013–2017)
- Deny Lépine (2017–present)

== See also ==
- Portneuf Regional Natural Park
