= Portneuf Regional Natural Park =

Regional park in Quebec, Canada

Portneuf Regional Natural Pack Parc naturel régional de Portneuf
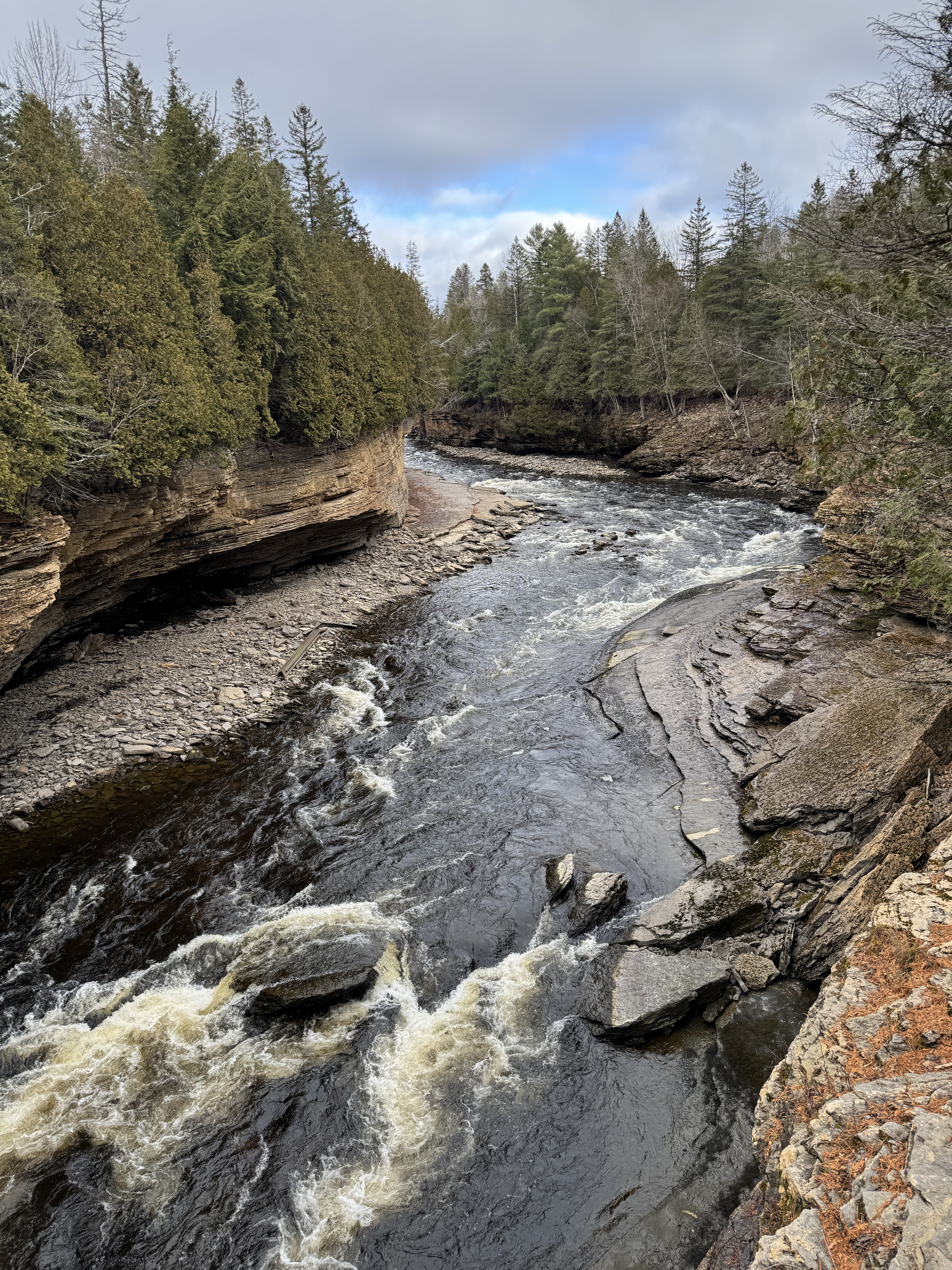
- Sainte-Anne River gorge sector, Saint-Alban
- Interactive map of Portneuf Regional Natural Pack; Parc naturel régional de Portneuf
- Nearest city: Saint-Alban Portneuf RCM0 Quebec Canada
- Coordinates: 46°49′21″N 72°09′12″W
- Area: 70 kilometres (43 mi)
- Established: 2014
- Website: parcportneuf.com

Portneuf Regional Natural Park Parc naturel régional de Portneuf (French), is located on the territory of Portneuf City and the municipalities of Saint-Ubalde, Saint-Alban, Saint-Casimir and Rivière-à-Pierre, Portneuf RCM, Capitale-Nationale, Quebec, Canada.

== Geography ==
Between territory affected by human activity and the great outdoors, between rocky escarpments, mountains, exceptional trees, peat bogs and flowering undergrowth, lakes, rivers and streams, the Portneuf Regional Natural Park, in all seasons in certain sectors, offers more than 70 km of walking trails, winding, sometimes very rugged, of easy, intermediate and difficult, lasting from 5 minutes to almost 4 hours.

== Hiking and nature observation ==
The territory of the Portneuf Regional Natural Park includes sectors distributed in disjointed areas.

- Trails in Sainte-Anne River Gorges sector: Cascatelles, Gorges, Poetic Cédrière, Island, Forced pipeline
- Trails in Long and Montauban lakes sector: Marcotte Falls, Marmites, Summits, Tour Mountain Waterfalls, Black River, La Glacière
- Trails in Lakes sector: De la Traverse, Sept Merveilleux
- Trails in Carillon Lake sector: Montauban/Mékinac limit, De l’Ours, Du Geai, Du Lièvre, Du Vison and Carillon/Lac Blanc bike/walking trail
- Discovery and educational visit: Trou du Diable section give acces to the second largest cave in Quebec, with a little over a kilometer of underground galleries, is located northeast of the village of Saint-Casimir.

The Portneuf Regional Natural Park manages the Spéléo Québec property and caving activities at Trou du Diable. From mid-May to the beginning of December, the Quebec Speleology Society (Speleo Quebec) offers two routes: discovery and educational visits, for a fee (Reservation required).

- The tourist route, lasting 1h30, is intended to be an introduction to caving accessible to all.
- The adventure course, lasting 3 hours, is more difficult to access and physically demanding. The Jean Lamarre section is done by crawling in a wet and muddy space, under a very low ceiling, to end on all fours parts with water up to your neck. The adventure provides a wave of emotions and a good swim. Humidity 100%.

The most popular outdoor activities in the different sectors of the park are cross-country skiing, snowshoeing, hiking, climbing and fishing.

== Flora ==
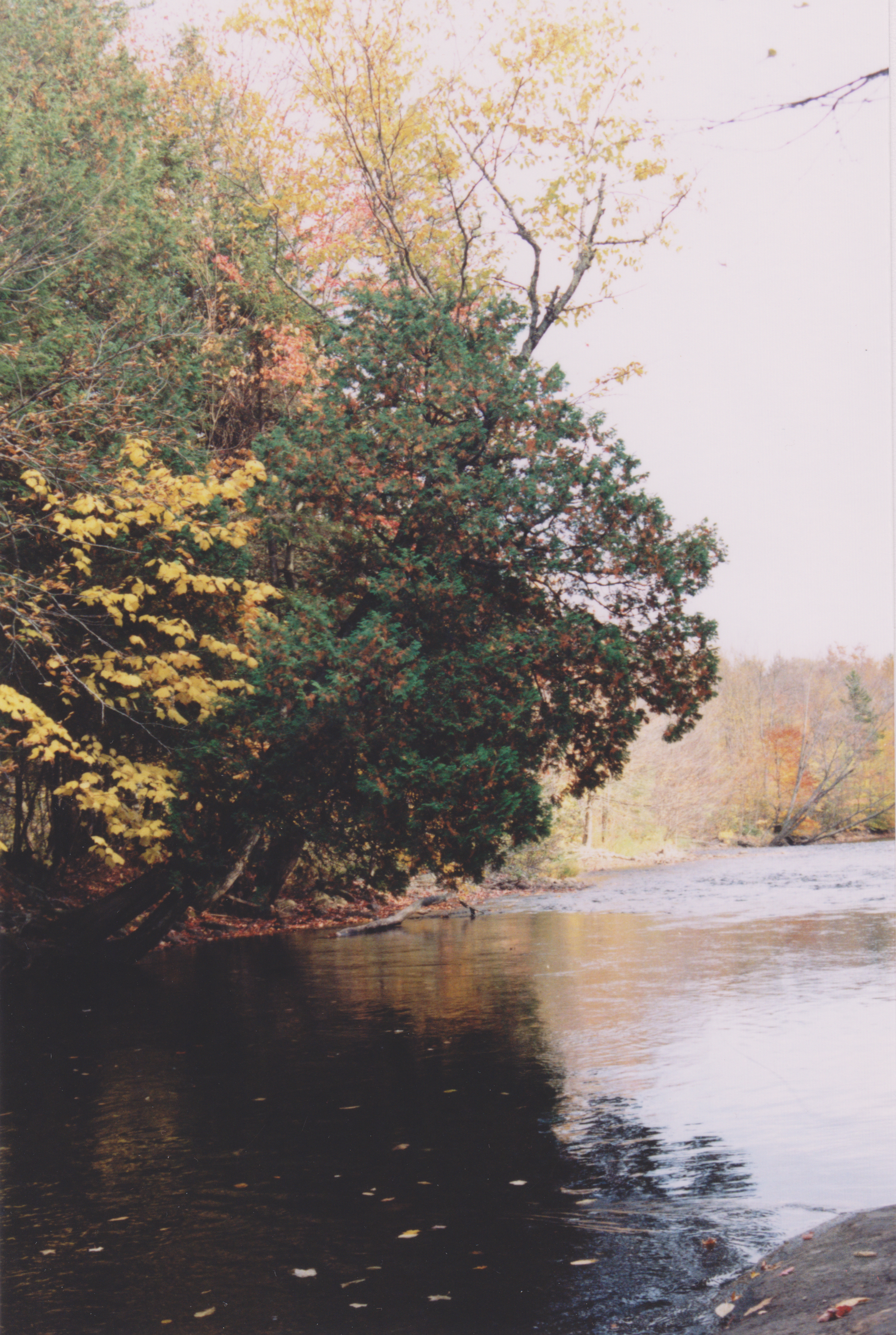
Mid-October colors, Yellow birch, Larch, Tamarack, Hemlock and others, Noire River, Saint-Alban

A large part of the territory has been the subject of logging for more than 200 years. So, the harvest of Tamarack (Red spruce) and Allegheny birch (Yellow birch) was done without concern for regeneration, between 1870 and 1890 the harvest of the bark of Canadian tsuga (Tsuga) for its tannery properties led to the modification of the composition of all the ecosystem.

== Fauna ==
According to the Act respecting threatened and vulnerable species of Quebec, 5 species with precarious status have been identified in the park territory. A brood of peregrine falcons is regularly observed on the cliff and lake trout in Long Lake. The northern dusky salamander has been identified in the park and the Arctic char is present in the Cœur and Anguille lakes.

Also, due to its legal status, a reserved containment area ensures the protection of white-tailed deer in the park.

== Accommodation ==
Portneuf Regional Natural Park provides visitors with:

- Rental chalets
- Ready-to-camp tents in the sectors: Long Lake, Carillon Lake and Gorges of the Sainte-Anne river
- Rustic camping sites
