= Portneuf County =

Historical county in Quebec, Canada

Coordinates: 47°00′N 72°00′W

Portneuf County (French: comté de Portneuf, pronounced [kɔ̃te də pɔʁnœf]) is a historic county in Quebec, Canada west of Quebec City on the Saint Lawrence River in Canada.

The county seat was Cap-Santé. Previously named Hampshire County (after Hampshire, England) formed in 1792 at the end of the French Regime from the former Montreal District and as a constituent riding for the Legislative Assembly of Lower Canada before being renamed Portneuf County by a law of the province of Lower Canada (9 George IV ch. LXXII) in 1829. It was bounded on the west by Champlain County on the northeast by Quebec County, and on the south by Lotbiniere County. Portneuf County consisted of six former seigneuries.

In the early 1980s, Quebec abolished its counties and most of Portneuf County became the Portneuf Regional County Municipality. The southeastern part of the county was transferred to La Jacques-Cartier Regional County Municipality and the Quebec Urban Community (now Quebec City) while parts of western Portneuf County were transferred to Mékinac Regional County Municipality.

== Constituent towns, municipalities and parishes ==
- Neuville
- Pointe-aux-Trembles
- Cap-Santé
- Pointe-aux-Écureuils, Quebec
- Donnacona
- Sainte-Catherine-de-Portneuf
- Sainte-Jeanne-de-Pont-Rouge
- Notre-Dame-des-Anges
- Montauban-les-Mines
- Lac-au-Sables
- Saint-Augustin-de-Desmaures
- Grondines
- Deschambault
- Saint-Raymond
- Lac-Sergent
- Notre-Dame-de-Portneuf
- Saint-Basile-Sud
- Saint-Basile
- Notre-Dame-de-Portneuf
- Portneuf
- Fossambault-sur-le-Lac
- Duchesnay
- Jacques-Cartier
- Saint-Casimir
- Saint-Léonard-du-Port-Maurice
- Sainte-Christine-d'Auvergne
- Perthuis
- Saint-Gilbert
- Saint-Marc-des-Carrières
- Saint-Alban
- Saint-Thuribe
- Saint-Ubalde
- Val-Bélair

== Creation of the county ==
Initially, Portneuf County included the parishes of Saint-Casimir, Grondines, Deschambault, Cap-Santé, St-Basile, Saint-Raymond-Nonnat, Sainte-Catherine, Les Écureuils, Pointe-aux-Trembles, Saint-Augustin, Saint-Alban and the townships of Gosford, Alton, Roquemont of Montauban and Colbert.

== See also ==
- Electoral districts of Lower Canada
