= La Chevrotière River =

Watercourse in Québec, Canada

La Chevrotière River Old name: Le Grand Bras (French)
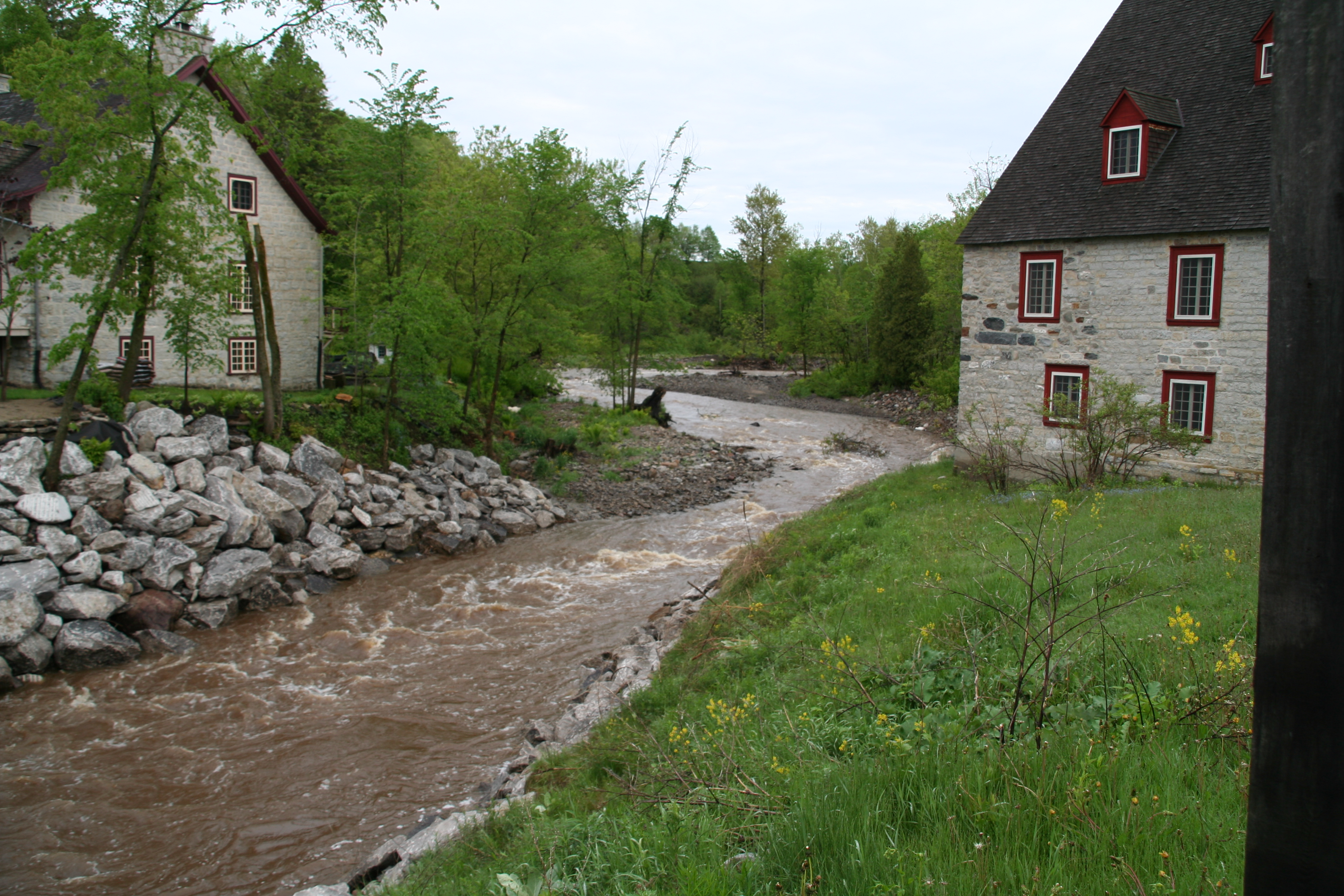
- River and Water mill La Chevrotière

- Location within Quebec
- Native name: Rivière La Chevrotière (French)

Location
- Country: Canada
- Province: Quebec
- Region: Capitale-Nationale
- Regional County Municipality: Portneuf Regional County Municipality
- Municipality: Portneuf, Saint-Gilbert et Saint-Gilbert

Physical characteristics
- Source: Swamp area
  - location: Portneuf
  - coordinates: 46.77636°N 71.95705°W
  - elevation: 126
- Mouth: Saint Lawrence River
  - location: Deschambault-Grondines
  - coordinates: 46.624422°N 71.98563°W
  - elevation: 50 m
- Length: 26.3 km (16.3 mi)

Basin features
- Tributaries
  - left: (Upward from the mouth) Le Petit Bras, ruisseau chez Godin.
  - right: (Upward from the mouth) Ruisseau des Lefebvre, ruisseau du Moulin, ruisseau non identifié.

La Chevrotière is a tributary of the northwest shore of the Saint Lawrence River, descending in the municipality of Portneuf, Saint-Gilbert and Deschambault-Grondines, in the Portneuf, in the administrative region of Capitale-Nationale, in Quebec, in Canada.

The La Chevrotière river valley is mainly served by the route 138 which runs along the northwest shore of the St. Lawrence River and the route 363 which passes on the north side of this valley. The secondary roads serving this area are Chemin du 3e rang, Chemin Gravel, Rue Principale, Route du Moulin, Route d'Irlande and Chemin du rang de la Chapelle.

Agriculture is the main economic activity in the sector; forestry, second.

The surface of the La Chevrotière River (except the rapids areas) is generally frozen from the beginning of December to the end of March; however, safe circulation on the ice is generally from late December to early March. The water level of the river varies with the seasons and the precipitation; the spring flood occurs in March or April.

== Geography ==
The La Chevrotière River is located on the north shore of the Saint-Laurent River, halfway between Trois-Rivières and Quebec, more precisely between the slopes of the Sainte-Anne River (to the west) and the Portneuf River (to the east).

The La Chevrotière River has its source in a marsh area near the chemin de rang de la Chapelle in the municipality of Portneuf and south-east of Domaine-Alouette. This source is located 3.6 kilometres (2.2 mi) east of a curve of the course of the river Sainte-Anne River and 11.1 kilometres (6.9 mi) north-east of the St. Lawrence River (i.e. in the village of Portneuf).

From its source, the La Chevrotière River then flows over a distance of 26.3 kilometres (16.3 mi) (or 16.9 kilometres (10.5 mi) in a direct line), with a drop of 126 metres (413 ft), according to the following segments:

- 1.0 kilometre (0.62 mi) to the south, winding through the forested area, up to the path of rang de la Chapelle;
- 1.6 kilometres (0.99 mi) to the south while winding in the forest zone, up to the road to Southern Ireland, corresponding to the discharge (coming from the northeast) of the stream at Godin's;
- 4.4 kilometres (2.7 mi) towards the southwest by winding in agricultural and forestry zone, until the road of the Mill;
- 3.7 kilometres (2.3 mi) to the south in agricultural and forestry areas, to a stream (coming from the west);
- 2.5 kilometres (1.6 mi) to the south, winding heavily through agricultural and forestry areas, passing from the west side of the village of Saint-Gilbert to rue Principale;
- 4.4 kilometres (2.7 mi) towards the south-east winding through an agricultural area by crossing the Gravel road, then the third range road, up to Le Petit Bras (coming from the North);
- 1.7 kilometres (1.1 mi) to the south by winding in an agricultural zone, then branching west to cross the route 363 (route Dussault), then south up to the Moulin stream (coming from the West);
- 1.7 kilometres (1.1 mi) towards the south-east in an agricultural zone along the Dussault road, to the railway bridge located very close (i.e. on the east side) of the hamlet La Chevrotière;
- 5.3 kilometres (3.3 mi) to the southwest in the agricultural zone, forming a loop to the southwest, collecting the Lefebvre stream (coming from the southwest), passing under the Saint-Éloi Bridge (route Julien) then under the two bridges of autoroute 40, forming a three loops to the northeast and one to the west before crossing the route 138, to its mouth.

The confluence of the La Chevrotière River is located 3.2 kilometres (2.0 mi) southeast of the railway; 7.8 kilometres (4.8 mi) south-east of the center of the village of Saint-Marc-des-Carrières; 5.7 kilometres (3.5 mi) north-east of the center of the village of Grondines; 5.3 kilometres (3.3 mi) southwest of the village center of Donnacona.

== Toponymy ==
Its name is taken from François de Chavigny Lachevrotière, who became lord of the fief of La Tesserie in 1674 - in 1698 this fief was named La Chevrotière.

The toponym "La Chevrotière" was formalized on March 9, 1988, at the Place Names Bank of the Commission de toponymie du Québec.

== See also ==
- Portneuf Regional County Municipality
- Water Mill La Chevrotière fr
- List of rivers of Quebec

== Bibliography ==
- CAPSA (2014). Plans directeurs de l'eau des secteurs d'intervention de la zone de gestion de la CAPSA: Sainte-Anne, Portneuf et La Chevrotière (Water master plans of the intervention sectors of the CAPSA management area: Sainte-Anne, Portneuf and La Chevrotière) (PDF) (in French). Quebec: CAPSA. p. 691. Archived from the original (PDF) on 2019-02-14.
