= Cultural heritage of Quebec =

Canadian cultural heritage

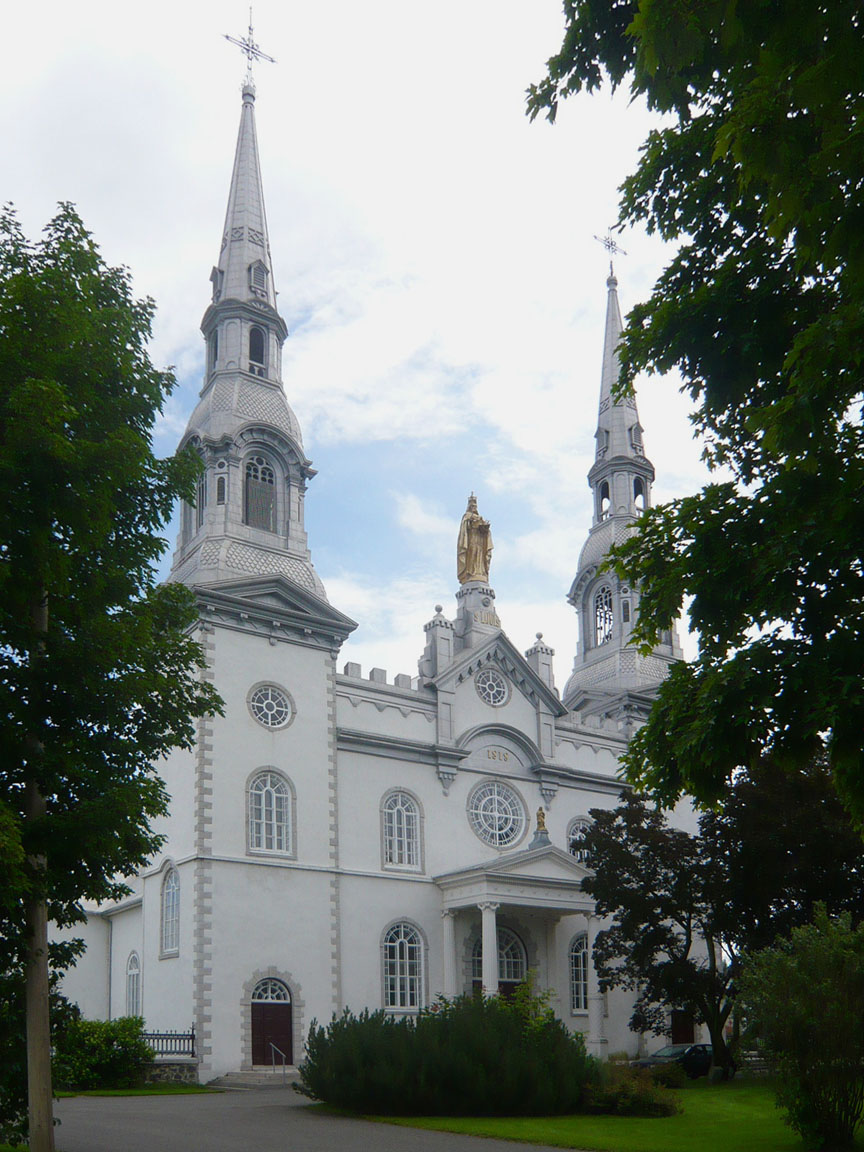
Saint-Louis Church, Lotbinière, classified as a historic monument in 1965.

According to the Loi sur le patrimoine culturel du Québec, the cultural heritage of Quebec is made up of deceased historical figures, historic places and events, heritage documents, buildings, objects and sites, heritage cultural landscapes and intangible heritage.

The elements that make up cultural heritage of Quebec are listed in the Registre du patrimoine culturel du Québec, held by the Québec government's Ministère de la Culture et des Communications. Items listed in the Register of Cultural Heritage and public information about them are published in the Répertoire du patrimoine culturel du Québec, the Ministère de la Culture et des Communications' platform for disseminating information about Quebec's heritage.

== History of the protection and enhancement of Quebec's cultural heritage ==
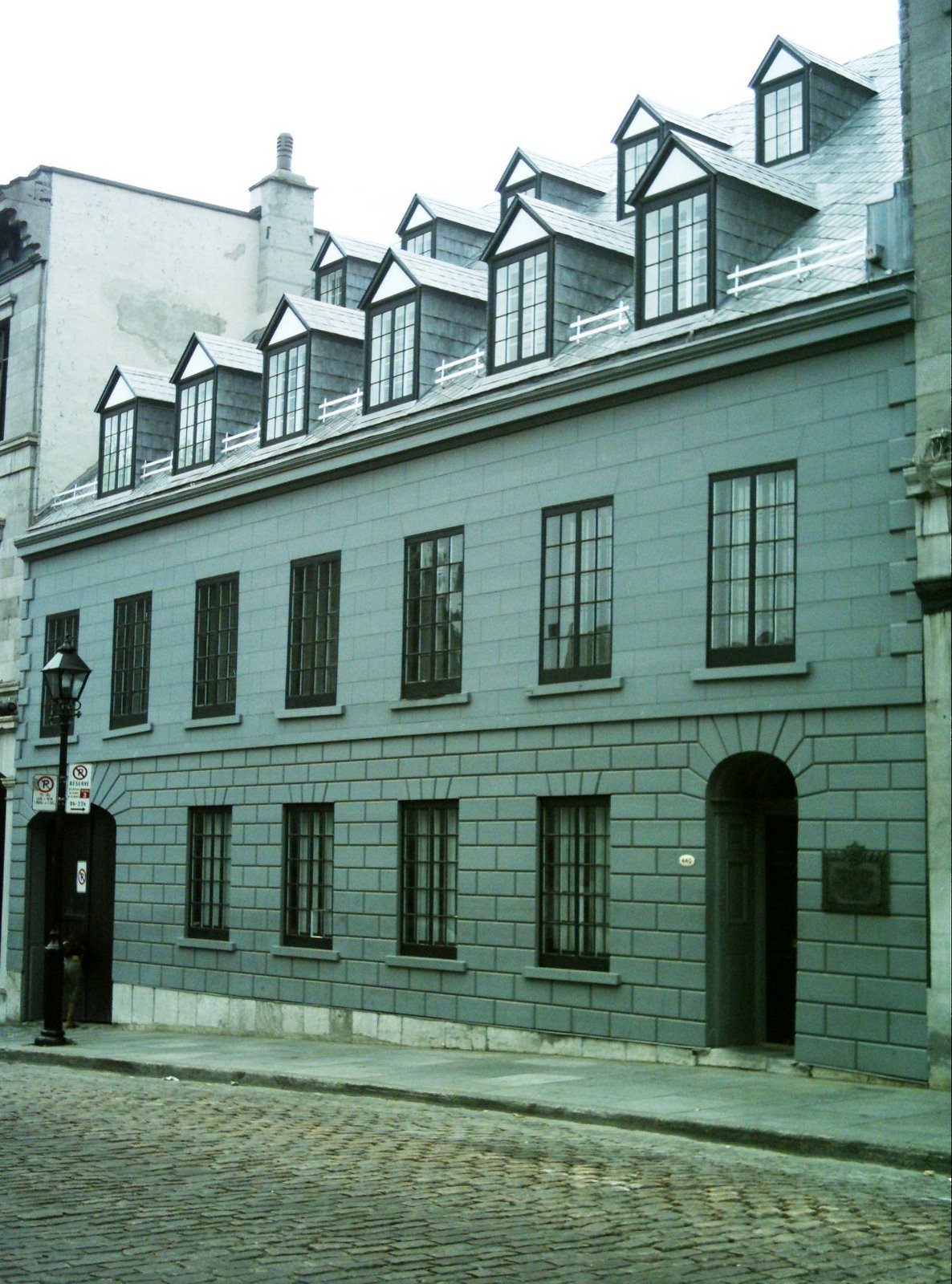
Papineau House, located on rue de Bonsecours in Old Montreal.

The first Quebec law adopted to protect Quebec's heritage was the Act respecting the conservation of monuments and objets of art of historical or artistic interest. Presented to the Legislative Assembly by the Secretary of the Province, Louis-Athanase David, the Act was assented to on March 21, 1922. The Act empowers Cabinet to classify monuments and objets of art. It also established the Commission des monuments historiques. In 1929, the government classified the first three historic monuments: the Maison des Jésuites-de-Sillery, the Notre-Dame-des-Victoires Church and the Château Ramezay.

In 1935, the Legislative Assembly passed the Île d'Orléans Act to protect the traditional character of this cradle of settlement in the St. Lawrence Valley, threatened by the construction of a bridge.

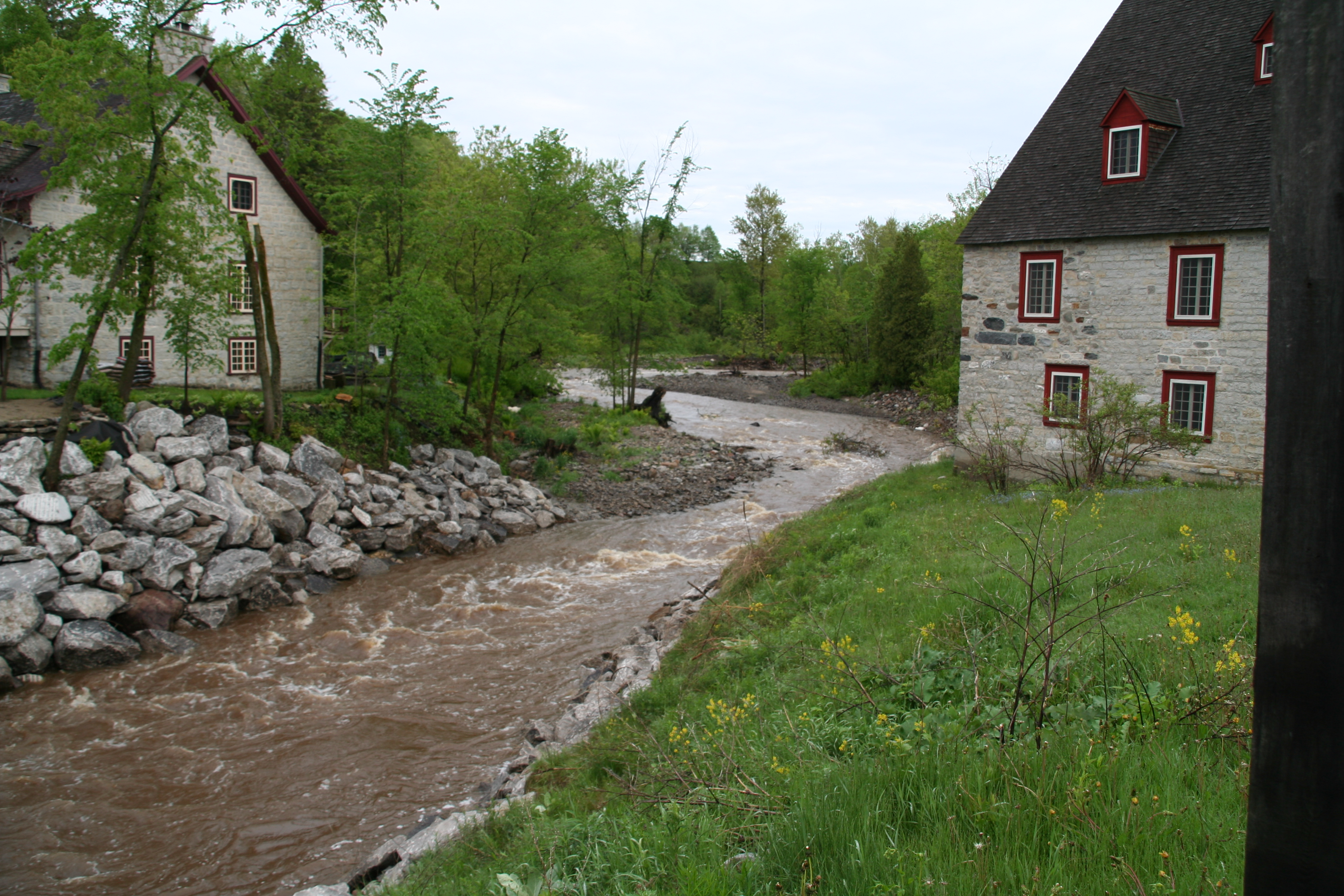
La Chevrotière River and Mill, Deschambault-Grondines.

Law on the conservation of monuments and works of art of historical or artistic interest is replaced by the Loi relative aux monuments, sites et objets historiques ou artistiques, assented to January 23, 1952. This Act was replaced by the Loi des monuments historiques, introduced by the Minister of Cultural Affairs, Georges-Émile Lapalme. It was assented to on July 10, 1963.

The Cultural Property Act, assented to on July 8, 1972, was a major step forward in the protection of Quebec's heritage. The Act was introduced in the National Assembly by the Minister of Cultural Affairs, Marie-Claire Kirkland. The Act gives the Minister the power to classify or recognize a property, monument or historic site, an archaeological property or site, a work of art, or a cinematographic, audiovisual, photographic, radio or television work.

On June 20, 1985, the Cultural Property Act was amended to allow Quebec municipalities to protect immovable property located within their territory.

On October 19, 2011, the National Assembly adopted the Cultural Heritage Act, introduced by Christine St-Pierre, Minister of Culture and Communications. Three years of public consultations precede this adoption. The Act replaces the Cultural Property Act on October 19, 2012.

On April 1, 2021, the National Assembly adopts the Act to amend the Cultural Heritage Act and other legislative provisions.

== Types of heritage elements (categories) ==
The Cultural Heritage Act states that cultural heritage consists of intangible heritage, heritage cultural landscapes, deceased historical figures, historic places and events, heritage documents and objects, and heritage buildings and sites.

- intangible heritage: the skills, knowledge, expressions, practices and representations transmitted from generation to generation and constantly recreated, which a community or group recognizes as part of its cultural heritage;
- heritage cultural landscape: any territory recognized by a community for its outstanding landscape features resulting from the interrelation of natural and human factors, which deserve to be preserved and, where appropriate, enhanced;
- historical figure: a person who really existed and played a recognized and significant role in history;
- historical event: a fact that occurred in the past, recognized as significant in history. It can be associated with a specific date, but it can also be linked more broadly to a historical period;
- historic site: a location recognized as significant in history. It can be associated with a character, a group or a significant event;
- heritage document: a medium on which information is carried; cinematographic, audiovisual, photographic, radio and television works and certain historical assets from previous laws became heritage documents with the entry into force of the Cultural Heritage Act in 2012;
- heritage object: movable property, other than a heritage document; works of art, archaeological property and certain historical property from previous laws became heritage objects with the coming into force of the Cultural Heritage Act in 2012;
- heritage immovable: immovable property; historic monuments under previous legislation and historic or archaeological sites classified before 1978 became heritage immovables with the coming into force of the Cultural Heritage Act in 2012;
- heritage site: a place, group of buildings or territory; historic or natural districts, heritage sites under previous legislation and historic or archaeological sites classified after 1978 became heritage sites with the coming into force of the Cultural Heritage Act in 2012.

== Legal status ==
The Loi sur le patrimoine culturel provides for five different statuses for the protection and enhancement of a heritage element:

- citation: the legal status that Quebec's local municipalities and Aboriginal communities can assign to a heritage site, building, document or object for protection purposes;
- classification: the legal status that the Minister of Culture and Communications can assign to a heritage site, building, document or object for protection purposes;
  - delimitation of a protection area: the Minister of Culture and Communications can delimit a protection area around a classified heritage building; this action is not automatic, however;
- declaration: a legal status that the Quebec government can assign to a heritage site for protection purposes;
- designation: a legal status that the Minister of Culture and Communications can assign to a historical figure, an historic event, a historic site or an element of intangible heritage for enhancement purposes; designation is also a legal status that the Quebec government can assign to a heritage cultural landscape for enhancement purposes;
- identification: legal status that local municipalities and aboriginal communities in Quebec can assign to a historical figure, an historic event, a historic site or an element of intangible heritage for enhancement purposes.

Any person or organization may propose the attribution of legal status under the Cultural Heritage Act. Proposals to the Ministère de la Culture et des Communications should be submitted using the forms available on its website.

== Heritage values ==
The application of the Cultural Heritage Act is based on the heritage values approach. By choosing to protect or enhance an element of cultural heritage, an authority formally recognizes its public interest, and intends to ensure the protection or enhancement of its heritage values, with a view to passing them on to future generations.

The heritage values set out in the Cultural Heritage Act are archaeological, architectural, artistic, emblematic, ethnological, historical, identity-related, landscape, scientific, urban planning or technological.

== Effects of granting status ==
The granting of certain legal status under the Cultural Heritage Act has a number of effects with regard to works and disposals. These effects are control measures that are specific to each category of heritage element:

In a heritage building:

- The owner must take the necessary measures to ensure the preservation of the building's heritage value;
- Authorization from the Minister of Culture and Communications is required before :
  - transporting the building outside Quebec;
  - alter, restore, repair, modify in any way or demolish all or part of this immovable;
  - moving the immovable or using it as a back-up to a construction;
- If the immovable is part of the domain of the State, the owner must obtain authorization from the Minister of Culture and Communications before selling, emphyteuzing or donating it;
- The owner of such an immovable must provide the Minister of Culture and Communications with at least 60 days' prior written notice before selling it, to enable him or her to exercise or not his or her right of pre-emption.

In a classified heritage site :

- The owner must take the necessary measures to ensure the preservation of the heritage value of the site or of an immovable located within the site;
- Authorization from the Minister of Culture and Communications is required before :
  - dividing, subdividing, redividing or parcelling out land;
  - modify the layout or layout of an immovable;
  - carry out any construction, repair or modification relating to the external appearance of an immovable;
  - demolish all or part of an immovable;
  - erect a new construction within the site;
  - excavate the ground, even inside a building;
  - erect a new sign, or modify, replace or demolish a sign or billboard;
- If the classified heritage site or an immovable located within the classified heritage site is part of the domain of the State, the owner must obtain authorization from the Minister of Culture and Communications before selling, emphyteuzing or donating it;
- The owner of a classified heritage site or of an immovable situated within a classified heritage site must give the Minister of Culture and Communications at least 60 days' prior written notice before selling it, to enable him or her to exercise or not his or her right of pre-emption.

== See also ==
- List of historic places in Capitale-Nationale
- List of National Historic Sites of Canada in Quebec

== Bibliography ==
- Québec. Loi sur le patrimoine culturel (in French).
- Ministère de la Culture et des Communications (2013). À propos de la Loi sur le patrimoine culturel: connaître, protéger, valoriser, transmettre notre héritage collectif (PDF) (in French). ISBN 978-2-550-67268-5.
- Ministère de la Culture et des Communications (2011). La loi sur le patrimoine culturel - Connaître, protéger, valoriser, transmettre (in French).
- Ministère de la Culture et des Communications (2012). La Loi sur le patrimoine culturel - Guide pratique destiné aux municipalités (PDF) (in French). ISBN 978-2-550-65819-1.
