= Thérèse Sauvageau =

- Born: December 28, 1915; Deschambault-Grondines
- Died: December 3, 2012 (aged 96); Saint-Sacrement Hospital

Thérèse Sauvageau (28 December 1915 – 3 December 2012) was a teacher, painter and writer from Quebec, Canada.

== Biography ==
Thérèse Sauvageau was born in Deschambault-Grondines, Quebec, Canada. She was a schoolteacher for 36 years. Upon retirement, she devoted herself to writing and painting. Her stories are based on oral tradition, conversations with elders, and extensive research in archives.

In 1969, after attending a painting class, she began to paint. She painted 97 canvases, which depict scenes of rural Quebec life from the years 1850-1950.

In 2008, her entire body of work was donated to the Musée de la civilisation in Quebec City.

Her stories and paintings are collected in three volumes published by Éditions Anne Sigier and distributed in Canada, France, Belgium, and Switzerland.

She died at the Saint-Sacrement Hospital in Quebec City on December 3, 2012, at the age of 96.

== Museums and public collections ==
- Musée de la civilisation
