= Saint-Alban, Quebec (parish) =

District in Canada

The parish municipality of Saint-Alban (French pronunciation: [sɛ̃t‿albɑ̃]) is a former parish now part of the current municipality of Saint-Alban, Quebec, Canada.

Prior to January 17, 1991, the parish of Saint-Alban was an independent municipality; on that date, it and the village of Saint-Alban were merged into the new municipality of Saint-Alban.

== History ==
The sector was originally part of Deschambault. In 1860, the sector became an independent municipality under the name of Saint-Alban-d'Alton. In 1918, a part of its territory was taken for the creation of Saint-Marc-des-Carrières. The same year, the more urban sector split to became the village municipality of Saint-Alban. Those two territories were then merged once again, in 2012, for the creation of the current Saint-Alban.

== Demographics ==
Historical census populations – Saint-Alban Parish

Year	Pop.	±%
1921	943	—
1931	938	−0.5%
1941	861	−8.2%
1951	870	+1.0%
1956	832	−4.4%
1961	777	−6.6%

Year	Pop.	±%
1966	675	−13.1%
1971	599	−11.3%
1976	544	−9.2%
1981	583	+7.2%
1986	543	−6.9%
1991	555	+2.2%

Source: Statistics Canada
