= Quebec Route 363 =

Highway in Quebec, Canada

Route 363

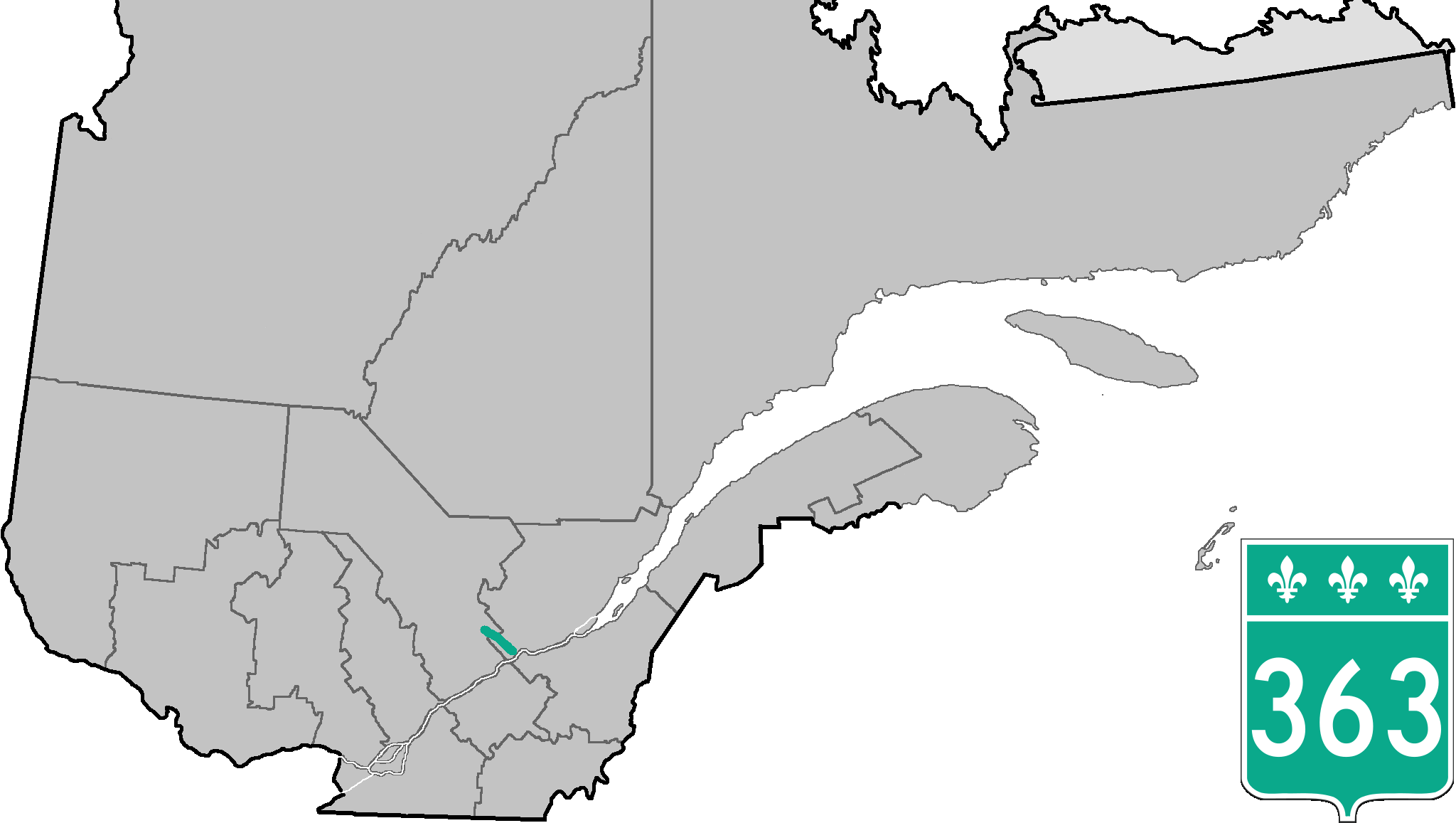

Route information
- Maintained by Ministère des transports du Québec
- Length: 51.2 km (31.8 mi)

Major junctions
- North end: R-153 in Lac-aux-Sables
- A-40 in Deschambault-Grondines
- South end: R-138 in Deschambault-Grondines

Location
- Country: Canada
- Province: Quebec
- Major cities: Deschambault-Grondines

Highway system
- Quebec provincial highways; Autoroutes; List; Former
← R-362	→ R-364

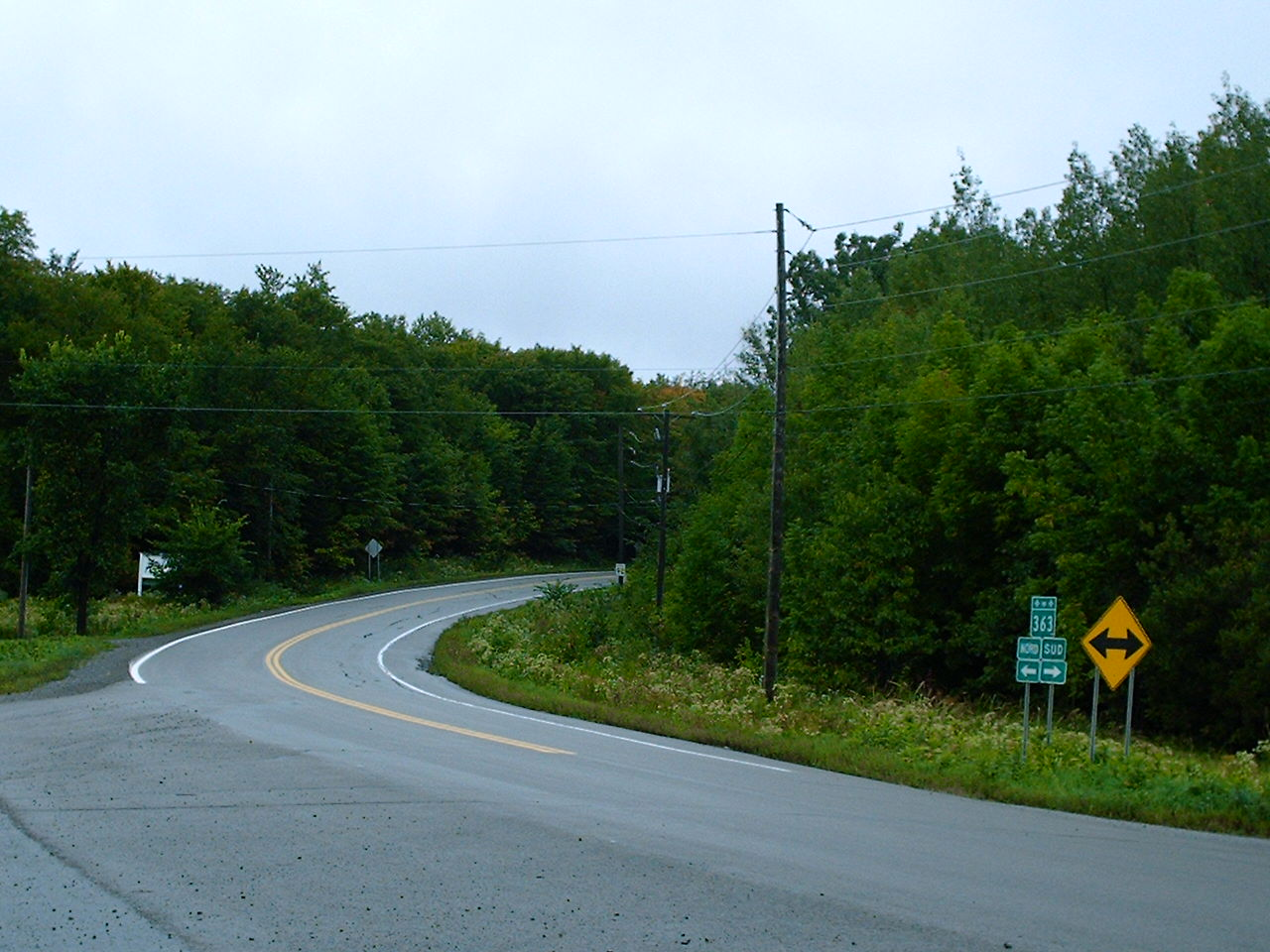
Route 363 northbound as it climbs up in the mountain

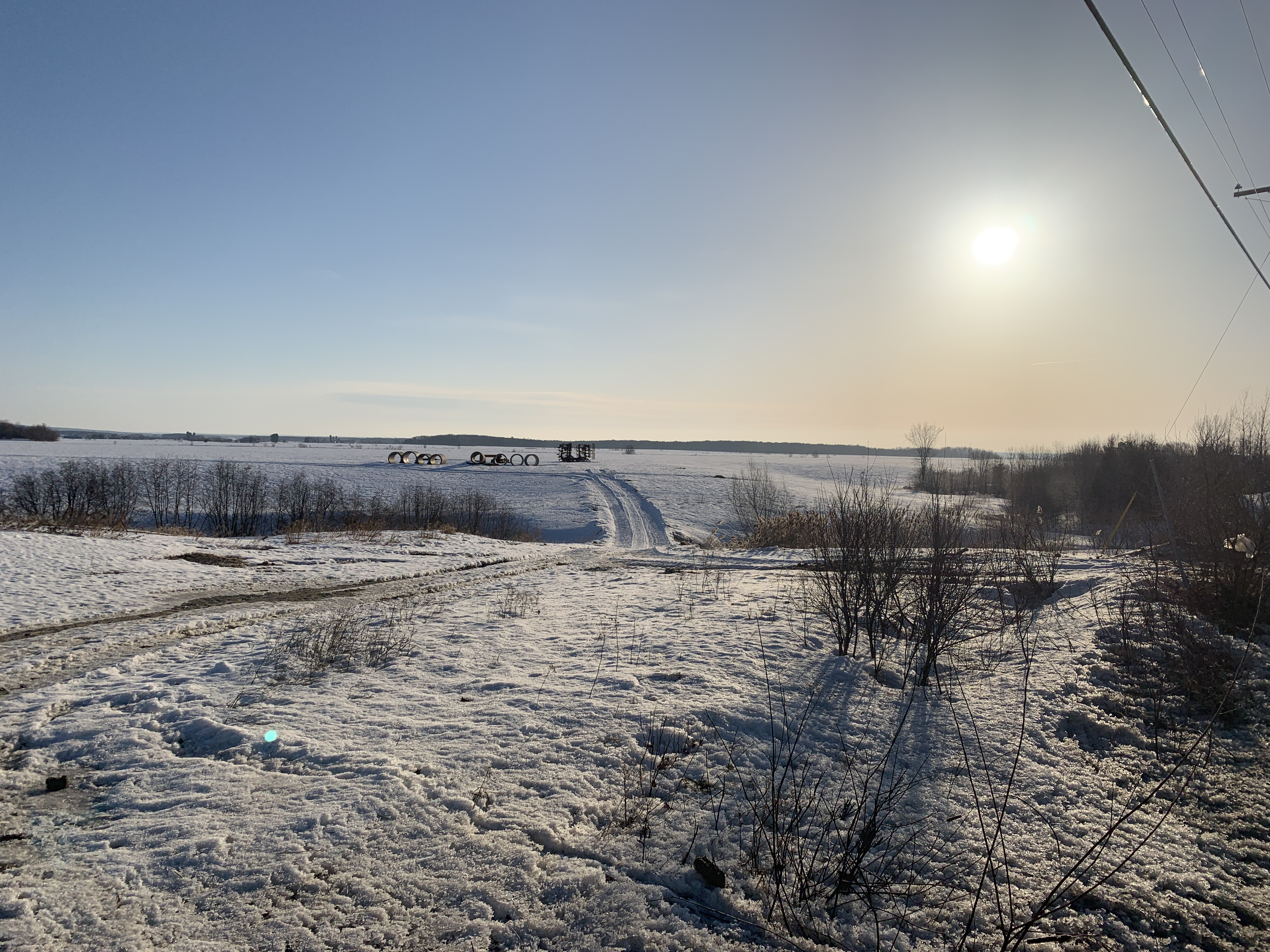
Saint-Casimir agricultural zone, from boulevard de la Montagne (route 363)

Route 363 (highest elevation: 575 ft or 175.3 m) is a 53 kilometres (33 mi) south-north route in Quebec, Canada, going from Route 138 in Deschambault-Grondines along the St-Lawrence river to Lac-aux-Sables.

It goes through St-Marc-des-Carrières where it is called Boulevard Bona-Dussault. After St-Marc, it enters a forest and then runs parallel to a railroad track.

It is then concurrent for about 3 km in St-Casimir with Route 354 along the Rivière Ste-Anne, where it is rue (street) Notre-Dame. Once it crosses the river, heading north, it is called Boulevard de la Montagne.

It also goes through St-Ubalde after having climbed the Laurentian Mountains. In the village of St-Ubalde, it has the name of Boulevard Chabot, but out of town, it takes the name of Rang St-Achille.

It ends at the junction of Route 153 in Lac Aux Sables.

There is an overpass at the Autoroute 40, where there is exit 254. This exit is a major truck stop with now 2 restaurants and gas stations on each side of the freeway. There is now a brand new Subway restaurant just built on the south side of the 40, along with a new and modern Esso gas station.

== Towns along Route 363 ==
- Deschambault-Grondines
- Saint-Marc-des-Carrieres
- Saint-Casimir
- Saint-Ubalde
- Montauban-les-Mines
- Lac-aux-Sables

== Major intersections ==
RCM or ET	Municipality	Km	Road	Notes
Portneuf	Deschambault-Grondines	0.0	R-138	Southern terminus of Route 363
Portneuf	Deschambault-Grondines	2.0	A-40	Exit 254 (A-40)
Portneuf	Saint-Marc-des-Carrières	8.2	Rue du Collège (To Saint-Gilbert)	
Portneuf	Saint-Marc-des-Carrières	9.0	Rue Bourque (To Saint-Alban)	
Portneuf	Saint-Casimir	13.1	R-354 east	Southern terminus of Route 354/Route 363 overlap
Portneuf	Saint-Casimir	15.1	Route des Grondines (To Grondines)	
Portneuf	Saint-Casimir	16.8	R-354 west	Northern terminus of Route 354/Route 363 overlap
Portneuf	Saint-Casimir	21.6	3^{e} Rang (To Saint-Thuribe)	
Mékinac	Notre-Dame-de-Montauban	43.7	R-367 south	Northern terminus of Route 367
Mékinac	Lac-aux-Sables	51.2	R-153 south	Northern terminus of Route 153; Northern terminus of Route 363

== See also ==
- List of Quebec provincial highways
