= Saint-Alban, Quebec (village) =

District in Canada

Coordinates: 46°43′04″N 72°04′45″W

The village municipality of Saint-Alban (French pronunciation: [sɛ̃t‿albɑ̃]) is a former village now part of the current municipality of Saint-Alban, Quebec, Canada.

Prior to January 17, 1991, the village of Saint-Alban was an independent municipality; on that date, it and the parish of Saint-Alban were merged into the new municipality of Saint-Alban.

== History ==
The sector was originally part of Saint-Alban-d'Alton. In 1918, the sector became an independent municipality. In 1991, the village was merged with the parish to create the current municipality of Saint-Alban.

== Demographics ==
Historical census populations – Saint-Alban Village

Year	Pop.	±%
1921	486	—
1931	522	+7.4%
1941	616	+18.0%
1951	719	+16.7%
1956	815	+13.4%
1961	786	−3.6%

Year	Pop.	±%
1966	815	+3.7%
1971	770	−5.5%
1976	726	−5.7%
1981	673	−7.3%
1986	652	−3.1%
1991	621	−4.8%

Source: Statistics Canada
