= Quebec Route 354 =

Highway in Quebec

Route 354

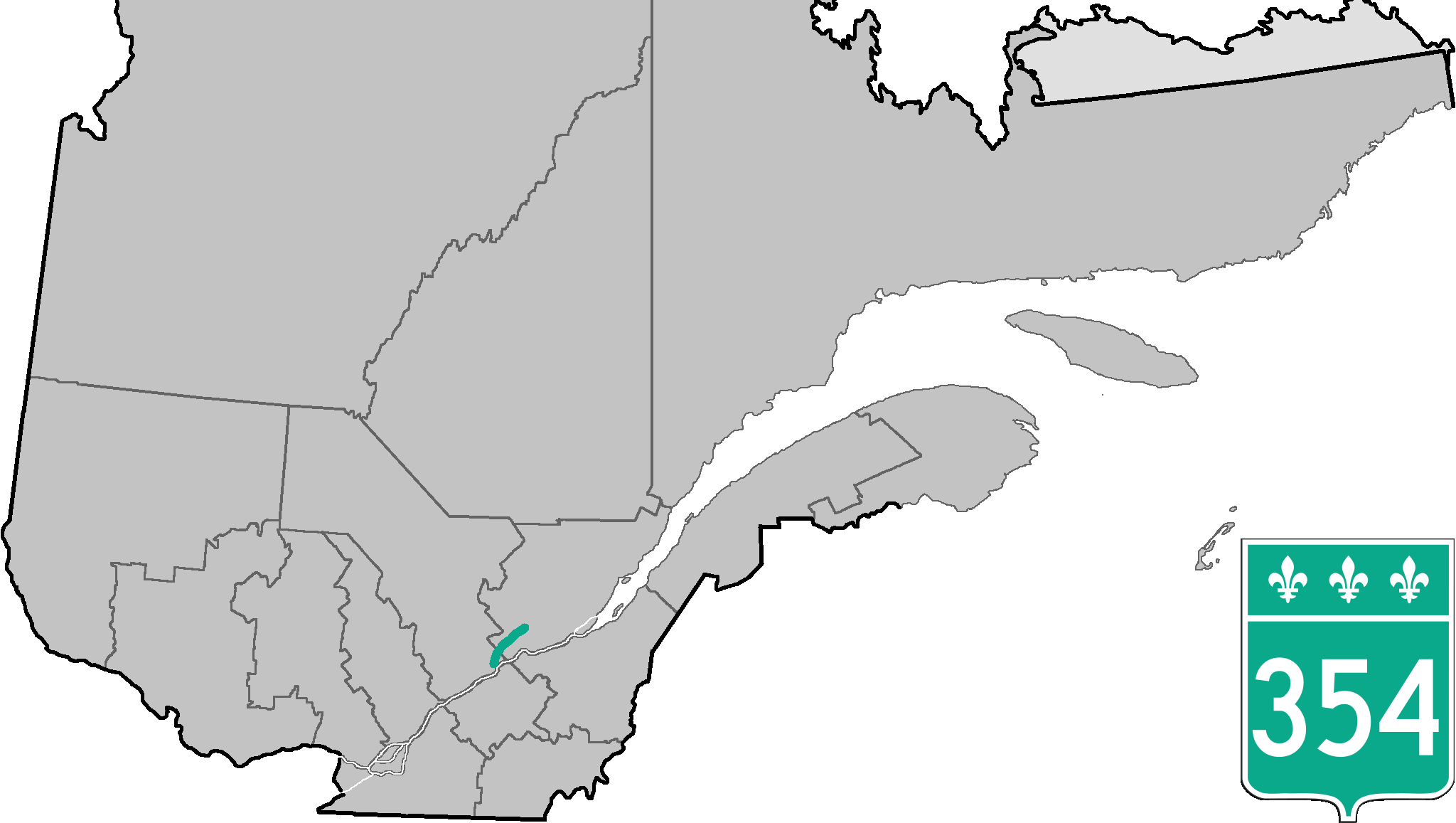

Route information
- Maintained by Ministère des transports du Québec
- Length: 50.6 km (31.4 mi)

Major junctions
- West end: R-159 – Sainte-Anne-de-la-Perade
- East end: R-365 – Saint-Raymond

Location
- Country: Canada
- Province: Quebec
- Major cities: Saint-Raymond-de-Portneuf

Highway system
- Quebec provincial highways; Autoroutes; List; Former
← R-352	→ R-358

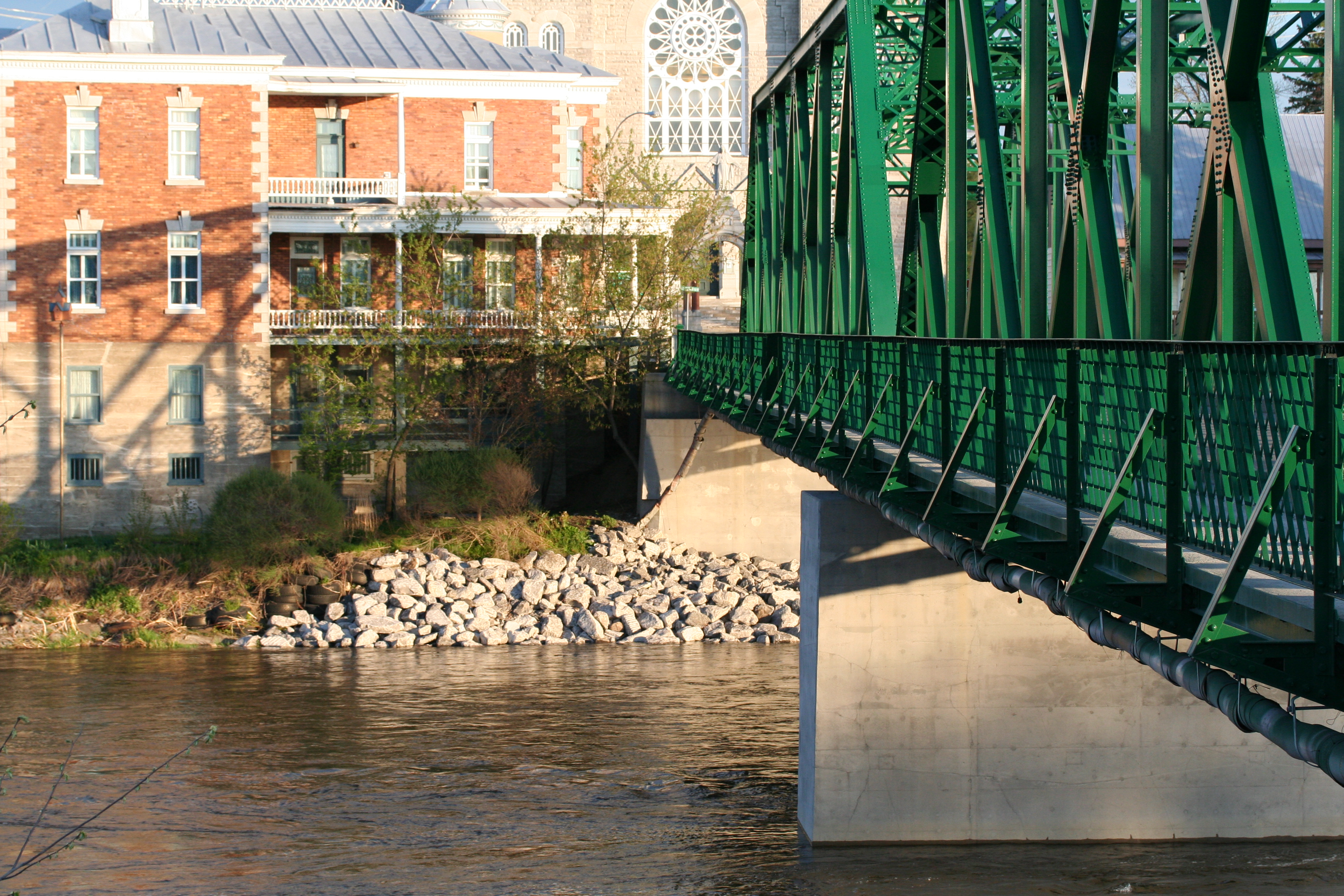
Saint-Casimir, Private residence, Sacré-Cœur-de-Jésus Parish Church, Sainte-Anne River, Bridge 06073, steel lower deck structure, Route 354

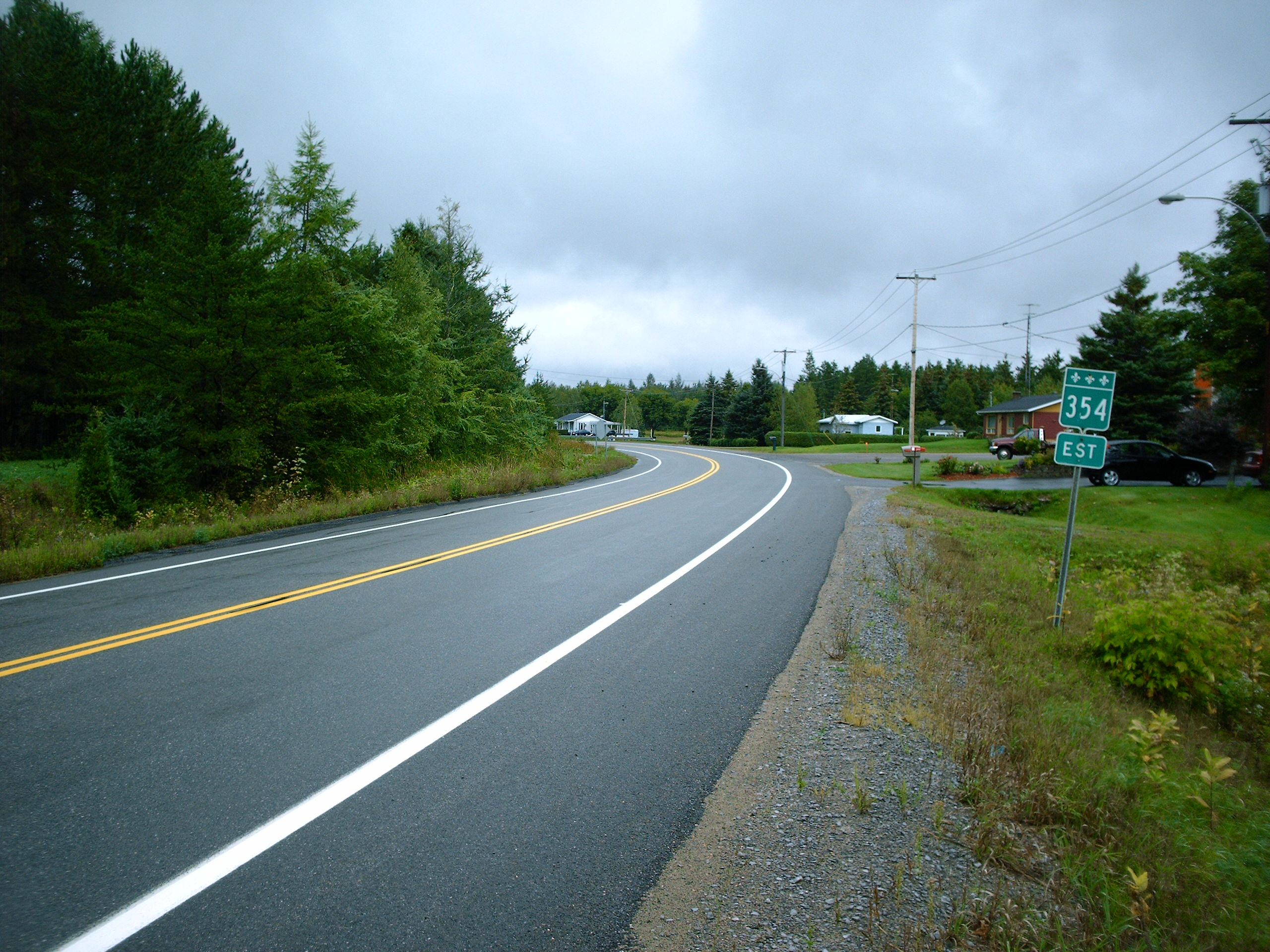
Route 354 eastbound, east of St-Casimir

Route 354 (highest elevation: 507 ft) is an east-west regional road in Quebec, Canada, starting from Route 159 north of Ste-Anne de la Pérade going to St-Raymond. It follows the Rivière Ste-Anne on the south shore most of the time. It is 55 km long, and overlaps Route 363 about 4 km in St-Casimir. Between St-Casimir and Ste-Anne-de-la-Pérade, it is named the "Rapide Nord", where it is the only part it is on the north shore of the river. It becomes rue Tessier Ouest in the village zone. This section was really bad until fall 2005, when it was newly paved on 12 km. Once it crosses the Rivière Ste-Anne, in the village of St-Casimir, it takes the name of rue (street) Notre-Dame.

From St-Alban to St-Raymond (Chute Panet), the route has the name of "Route du Golf", because there is the "Golf des Pins" in St-Alban. In St-Raymond, it connects to Route 365 and Route 367.

After Chute-Panet, arriving to St-Raymond, the route uses the name of rue (street) St-Pierre. There is no sign saying the 354 ends there, nor is there one saying that it starts there, either.

It goes through another village before Chute Panet: Sainte-Christine-d'Auvergne, a very small place. Right after passing Ste-Christine, there is the "Pont des Cascades", where canoers can start their expedition on the rivière Ste-Anne.

Many deer are visible on this route at night in the summer.

== Towns along Route 354 ==
- Saint-Casimir
- Saint-Alban
- Saint-Gilbert
- Sainte-Christine d'Auvergne
- Saint-Raymond-de-Portneuf

== Major intersections ==
RCM or ET	Municipality	Km	Road	Notes
Les Chenaux	Sainte-Anne-de-la-Pérade	0.0	R-159	Western terminus of Route 354
Portneuf	Saint-Casimir	11.0	R-363 north	Western terminus of Route 354/Route 363 overlap
Portneuf	Saint-Casimir	12.7	Route des Grondines (To Grondines)	
Portneuf	Saint-Casimir	14.7	R-363 south	Eastern terminus of Route 354/Route 363 overlap
Portneuf	Saint-Alban	18.9	Rang de l'Église (To Saint-Alban)	
Portneuf	Saint-Raymond	50.6	R-365	Eastern terminus of Route 354

== See also ==
- List of Quebec provincial highways
