= Saint-Casimir, Quebec =

Municipality in Quebec

Saint-Casimir
- Municipality
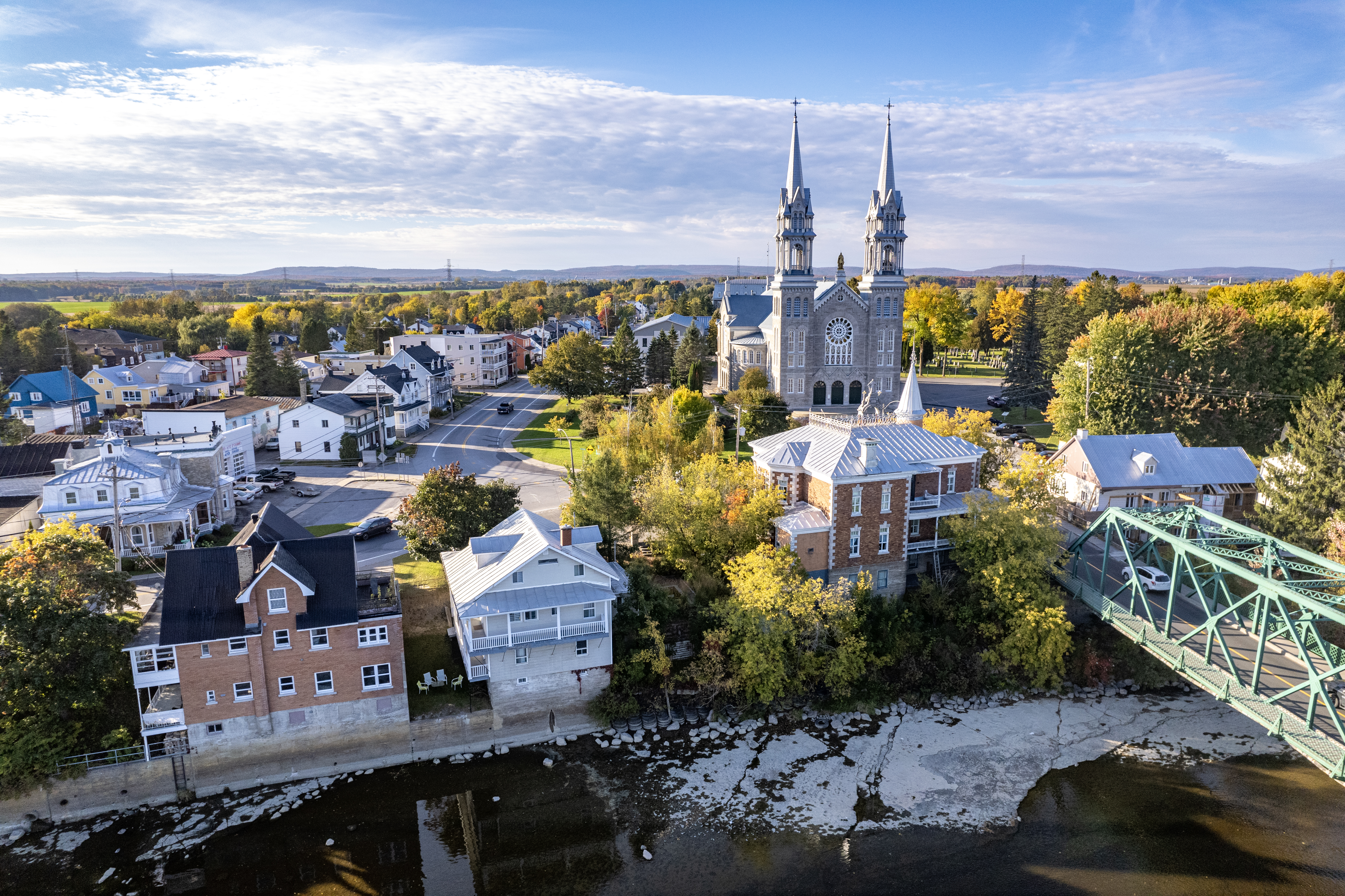

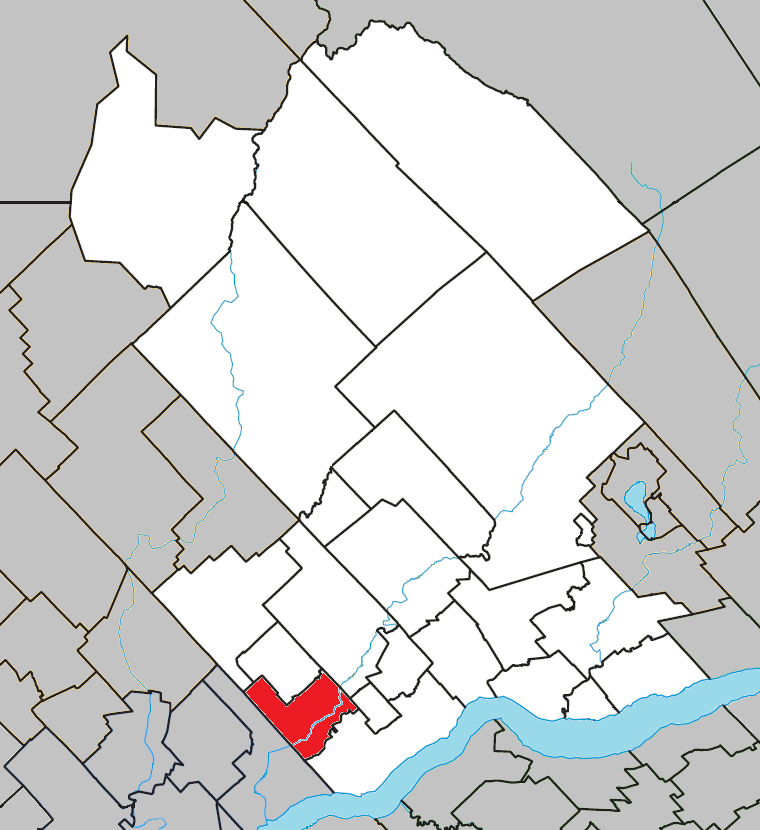
- Location within Portneuf RCM

- Location in central Quebec
- Coordinates: 46°39′N 72°08′W
- Country: Canada
- Province: Quebec
- Region: Capitale-Nationale
- RCM: Portneuf
- Settled: 1836
- Constituted: June 21, 2000

Government
  - Mayor: Lise Baillargeon
  - Fed. riding: Saint-Augustin—Portneuf—Jacques-Cartier
  - Prov. riding: Portneuf

Area
  - Total: 68.22 km^{2} (26.34 sq mi)
  - Land: 66.50 km^{2} (25.68 sq mi)
- Elevation: 27.5 m (90 ft)

Population (2021)
  - Total: 1,449
  - Density: 21.8/km^{2} (56/sq mi)
  - Pop (2016-21): ▲1.3%
  - Dwellings: 755
- Time zone: UTC−5 (EST)
  - Summer (DST): UTC−4 (EDT)
- Postal code(s): G0A 3L0
- Area codes: 418, 581
- Highways: R-354 R-363
- Website: www.saint-casimir.com

Saint-Casimir is a municipality of about 1500 people in the Portneuf Regional County Municipality in the province of Quebec, Canada. It is located on the Sainte-Anne River, about 80 kilometres (50 mi) southwest of Quebec City and 50 kilometres (31 mi) northeast of Trois-Rivières. It was founded in 1836 by people who came from Sainte-Anne-de-la-Pérade following to the east along the Sainte-Anne.

The name of Saint-Casimir was given in honour of Mr. Casimir Déry, a notary who paid for the construction of the church, which is in the top 10 of the most beautiful churches in the province of Québec. In turn, the church, and the town, is named after Saint Casimir, a patron saint of Poland, Lithuania, and youth.

== History ==
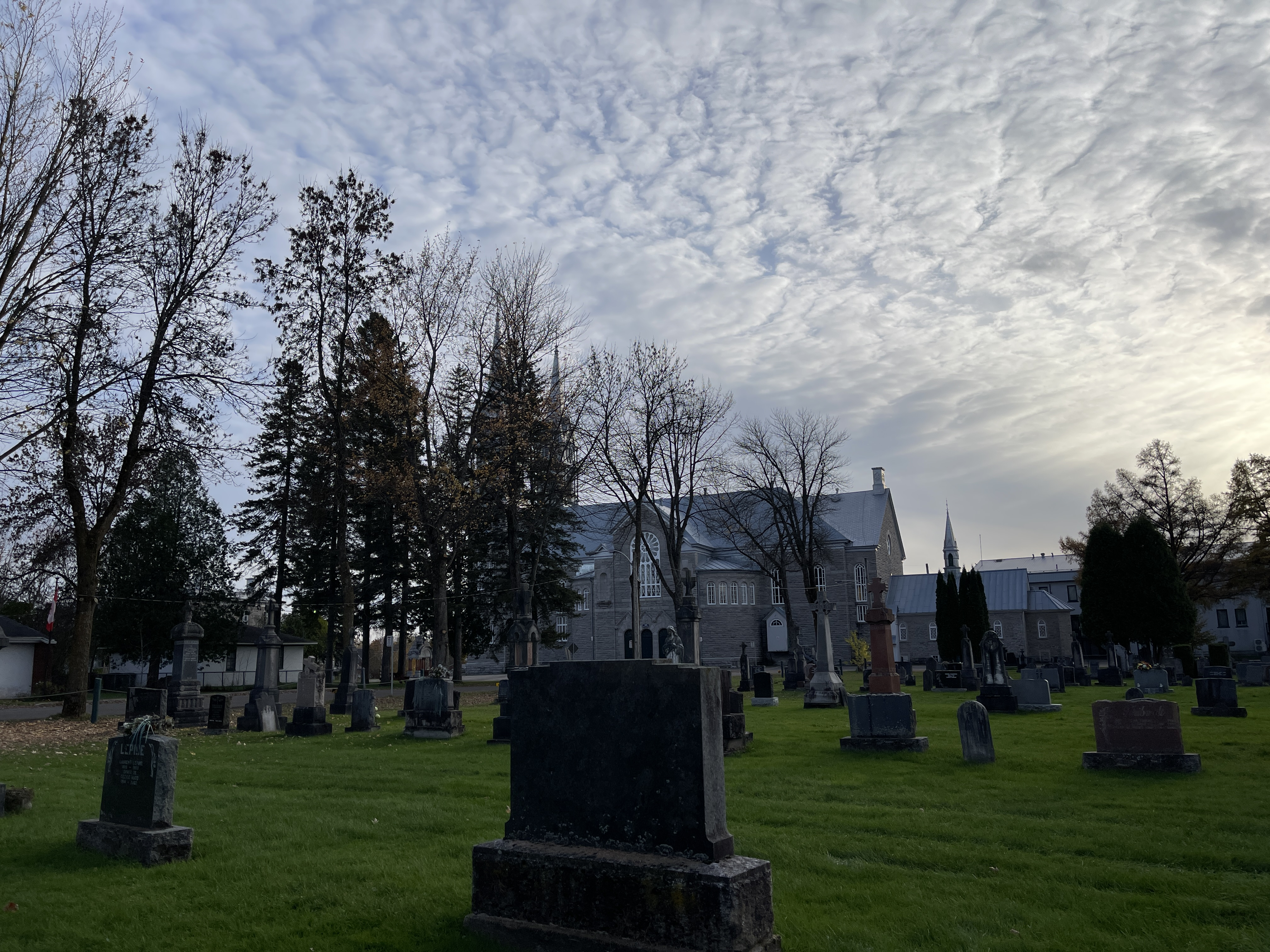
Sacred Heart of Jesus Parish Cemetery and Church

Saint-Casimir was founded in 1836 by people who came from Sainte-Anne-de-la-Pérade following to the east along the Sainte-Anne. In 1845, the Parish Municipality of Saint Casimir was formed, abolished in 1847, and reestablished in 1855. Its post office opened in 1852.

The Village Municipalities of Saint-Casimir and Saint-Casimir-Est split off from the parish municipality in 1912 and 1913 respectively.

In the summer of 1973, a wave on the Niagarette devastated a small area, where it joins the Sainte-Anne River. A few houses were destroyed by the powerful water wave, due to strong rain, and debris that blocked the small river for a few hours.

On July 25, 1981, the Municipality of Saint-Casimir was created through the merger of the Village Municipalities of Saint-Casimir and Saint-Casimir-Est.

On the morning of 22 March 1997, five members of the Order of the Solar Temple died in a mass suicide in Saint-Casimir. A small house exploded into flames, leaving behind five charred bodies for the police to pull from the rubble. Three teenagers, the children of one of the couples who died in the fire, were discovered in a shed behind the house, alive but heavily drugged.

On June 21, 2000, the Parish Municipality of Saint Casimir was merged into the Municipality of Saint-Casimir.

== Geography ==
Two provincial numbered roads go through St-Casimir: Route 354 (east-west - from Ste-Anne de la Pérade to St-Raymond) and Route 363 (south-north - from Deschambault to Lac-aux-Sables). Both roads lead to Autoroute 40, the Montreal-Québec City link on the north shore.

Five rivers run in Saint-Casimir: Sainte-Anne, Niagarette, Petite Niagarette, Blanche and Noire.

Saint-Casimir is also the home to a cavern, the "Trou du Diable" ("Devil's Hole"). It is the second-longest cave in Québec, at 980 metres (3,220 ft). It was formed by the former tributary of the Sainte-Anne River, which left behind a stream. Many tourists pass through it every summer.

== Demographics ==
Historical census populations – Saint-Casimir, Quebec

Year	Pop.	±%
1986	1,389	—
1991	1,331	−4.2%
1996	1,347	+1.2%
2001	1,582	+17.4%

Year	Pop.	±%
2006	1,528	−3.4%
2011	1,500	−1.8%
2016	1,430	−4.7%
2021	1,449	+1.3%

Population counts are not adjusted for boundary changes and merger.
Source: Statistics Canada

Private dwellings occupied by usual residents (2021): 693 (total dwellings: 755)

Mother tongue (2021):

- English as first language: 0.7%
- French as first language: 98.2%
- English and French as first languages: 0.4%
- Other as first language: 0.7%

== Education ==
Three Rivers Academy (of the Central Quebec School Board) in Trois-Rivières serves English-speaking students in this community for the secondary levels while Portneuf Elementary School in Cap-Santé serves elementary levels.

== Notable people ==
- Alain Grandbois was born in Saint-Casimir in 1900.

== See also ==
- Portneuf Regional Natural Park
