= Cap-Santé =

- City
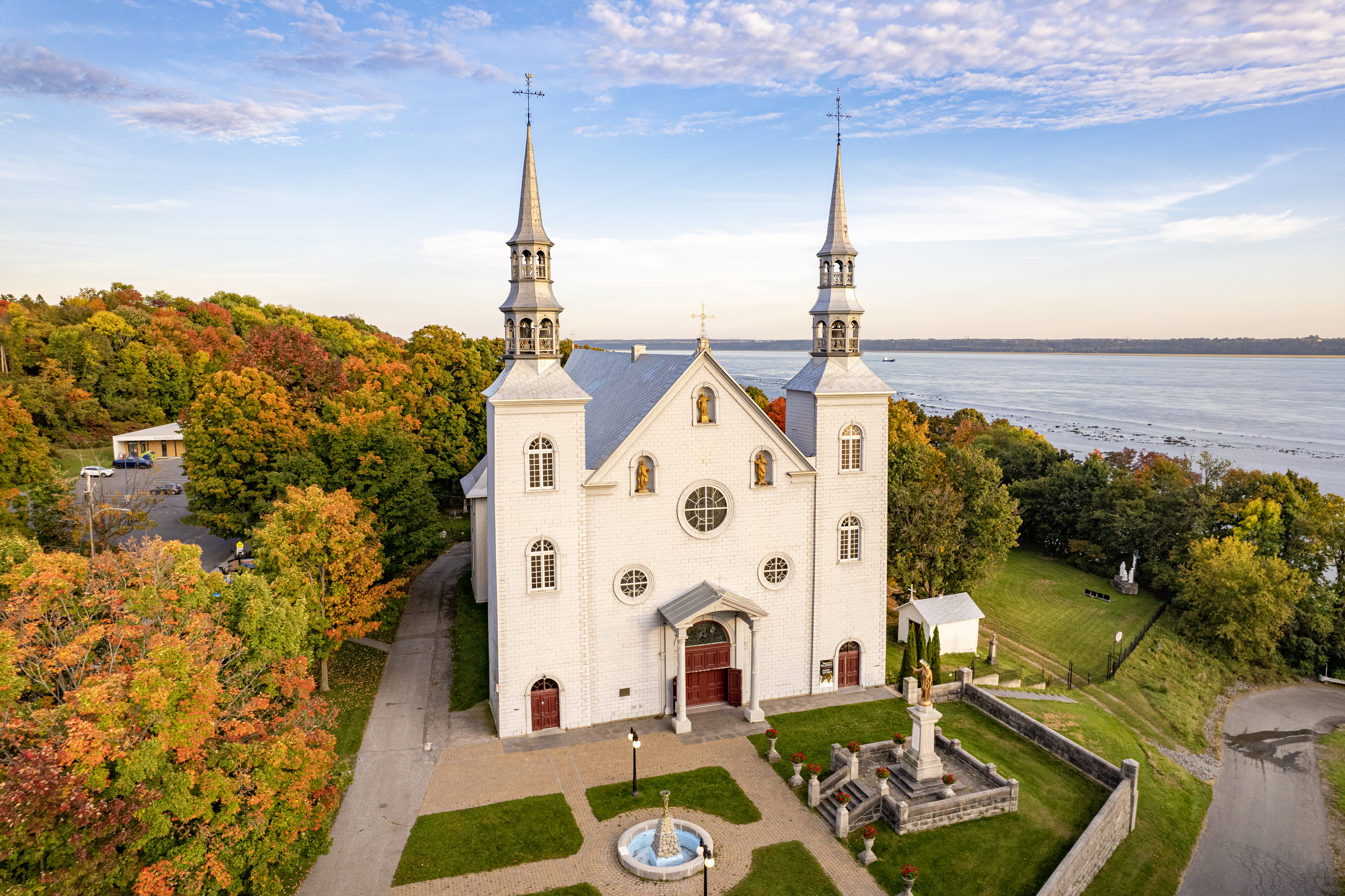

- Seal Coat of arms
- Motto: Ex Unitate Vires
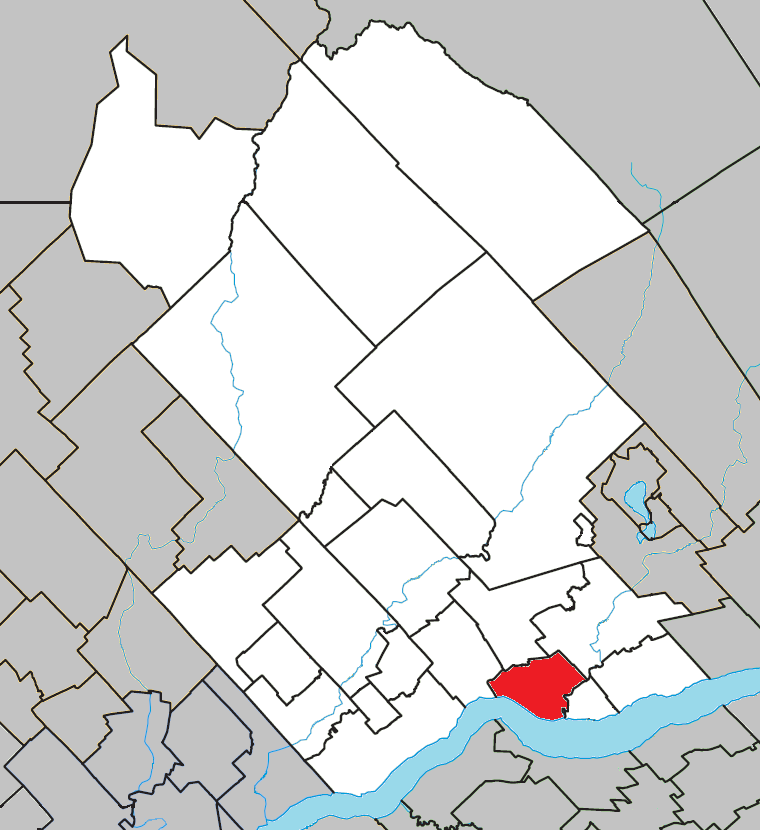
- Location within Portneuf RCM

- Location in central Quebec
- Coordinates: 46°40′N 71°47′W
- Country: Canada
- Province: Quebec
- Region: Capitale-Nationale
- RCM: Portneuf
- Settled: 1679
- Constituted: July 1, 1855

Government
  - Mayor: Michel Blackburn
  - Fed. riding: Saint-Augustin—Portneuf—Jacques-Cartier
  - Prov. riding: Portneuf

Area
  - Total: 70.03 km^{2} (27.04 sq mi)
  - Land: 54.49 km^{2} (21.04 sq mi)

Population (2021)
  - Total: 3,594
  - Density: 66/km^{2} (170/sq mi)
  - Pop (2016-21): ▲5.4%
  - Dwellings: 1,589
- Time zone: UTC−5 (EST)
  - Summer (DST): UTC−4 (EDT)
- Postal code(s): G0A 1L0
- Area codes: 418 and 581
- Highways A-40: R-138 R-358
- Website: www.capsante.qc.ca

Cap-Santé (French pronunciation: [kap sɑ̃te]) is a town in the Canadian province of Quebec. It is the county seat of Portneuf Regional County Municipality and was as well the county seat of the designated Portneuf County.

The name of the town means "Cape Health". Cap-Santé is on the northern bank of the Saint Lawrence River, 40 kilometres (25 mi) west of Quebec City. Legend has it that this community's name was coined when soldiers suffering from an unknown disease miraculously recovered from a cure discovered in the village.

The old settlement is situated just west of the nearby Jacques-Cartier River and on the embankment of the Saint Lawrence River.

== History ==
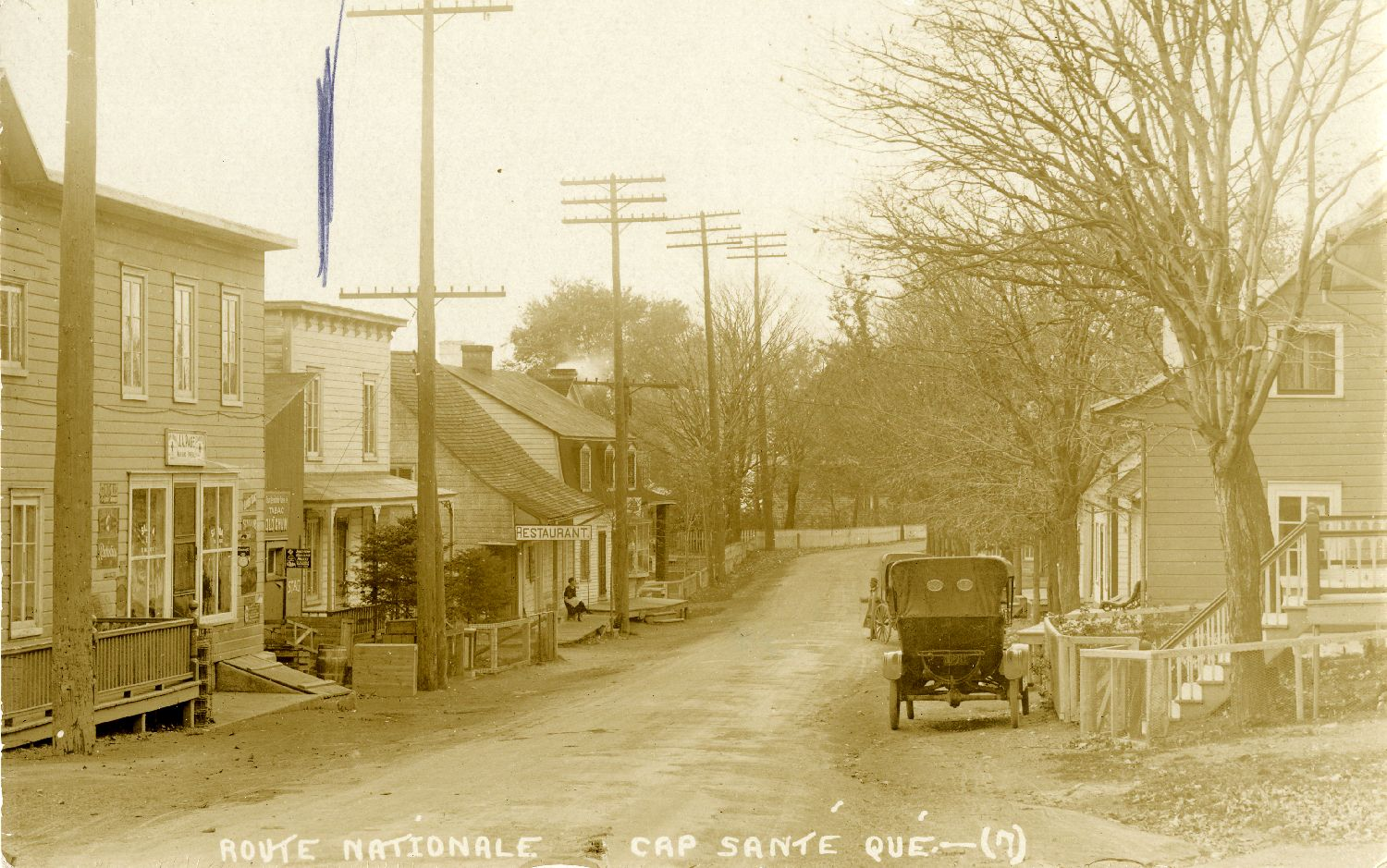
Cap-Santé in 1930

The first settlers arrived around 1679, and in 1714 the village became an official parish.

The present-day church, a historical-registered building, was built from 1754 to 1767. Interrupted during construction by the Seven Years' War (1756–1763), it is one of the last buildings to be constructed under the French regime. The church has a facade and two towers, a baroque interior, a neoclassical reredos, and two tiers of openings on the bell tower, a presbytery (designed by architect Charles Baillargé in 1849) featuring five neatly lined dormer windows. A cemetery encircles the square, leading to the river below.

The Place de l'Église square is crowned with old wells dating back to 1799. Vieux Chemin street was built along the same geographical line as that Chemin-du-Roy, the first road linking Montreal and Quebec City in the 18th century. Wooden and stone homes dot the narrow and shaded street that borders the cape. The quay is on the Saint Lawrence River.

In 1759 following the defeat of the French at the Battle of the Plains of Abraham during the Seven Years' War, the commander of the French forces, Chevalier de Lévis, ordered the construction of Fort Jacques-Cartier at the mouth of the Jacques-Cartier River from materials originally destined for the construction of a church. The following year, using the fort as a logistics base, Lévis attempted unsuccessfully with 7,000 men to recapture Quebec City from the British. The British captured the fort in September 1760 and kept a garrison there until 1763 after which they abandoned it. Virtually nothing remains of the fort aside from archaeological remains, which is also situated on private land inaccessible to the public on the 'Plateau Jacques-Cartier' district of the municipality. Close by, is the Allsopp House (late 18th century), an old seigneurial manor named after the Allsopp family, now a private property registered as a historical building.

The founder of the Congregation of the Sisters of Bon Pasteur, Marie Fitzbach, lived in Cap-Santé from 1826 to 1840. Gérard Morisset, architect and art historian, was also a resident, and designed the interiors of many of the region's churches.

== Demographics ==
In the 2021 Census of Population conducted by Statistics Canada, Cap-Santé had a population of 3,594 living in 1,509 of its 1,589 total private dwellings, a change of 5.4% from its 2016 population of 3,410. With a land area of 54.49 km^{2} (21.04 sq mi), it had a population density of 66.0/km^{2} (170.8/sq mi) in 2021.

Canada census – Cap-Santé community profile

| | 2021 | 2016 | 2011 |
| Population | 3,594 (5.4% from 2016) | 3,400 (13.5% from 2011) | 2,996 (12.4% from 2006) |
| Land area | 54.49 km^{2} (21.04 sq mi) | 54.53 km^{2} (21.05 sq mi) | 54.79 km^{2} (21.15 sq mi) |
| Population density | 66.0/km^{2} (171/sq mi) | 62.3/km^{2} (161/sq mi) | 54.7/km^{2} (142/sq mi) |
| Median age | 44.0 (M: 44.0, F: 44.0) | 44.4 (M: 43.5, F: 45.4) | 46.8 (M: 47.0, F: 46.7) |
| Private dwellings | 1,589 (total) 1,509 (occupied) | 1,529 (total) | 1,327 (total) |
| Median household income | $85,000 | $68,565 | $67,065 |

References: 2021 2016 2011

Historical Census Data - Cap-Santé, Quebec

| Year | Pop. | ±% |
|---|---|---|
| 1861 | 3,315 | — |
| 1871 | 1,350 | −59.3% |
| 1881 | 1,291 | −4.4% |
| 1891 | 1,185 | −8.2% |
| 1901 | 1,093 | −7.8% |
| 1911 | 989 | −9.5% |
| 1921 | 1,071 | +8.3% |
| 1931 | 1,103 | +3.0% |

| Year | Pop. | ±% |
|---|---|---|
| 1941 | 1,129 | +2.4% |
| 1951 | 1,406 | +24.5% |
| 1956 | 1,680 | +19.5% |
| 1961 | 1,744 | +3.8% |
| 1966 | 1,803 | +3.4% |
| 1971 | 1,958 | +8.6% |
| 1976 | 2,076 | +6.0% |
| 1981 | 2,463 | +18.6% |

| Year | Pop. | ±% |
|---|---|---|
| 1986 | 2,438 | −1.0% |
| 1991 | 2,563 | +5.1% |
| 1996 | 2,615 | +2.0% |
| 2001 | 2,571 | −1.7% |
| 2006 | 2,666 | +3.7% |
| 2011 | 2,996 | +12.4% |
| 2016 | 3,410 | +13.8% |
| 2021 | 3,594 | +5.4% |

Source: Statistics Canada

Mother tongue (2021):

- English as first language: 1.1%
- French as first language: 97.1%
- English and French as first languages: 0.6%
- Other as first language: 1.0%

== Arts and culture ==
Cap-Santé hosts a number of annual cultural events that draw both residents and visitors:

- The Symposium Cap-Santé riche en couleurs is an outdoor arts festival where dozens of visual artists exhibit their work in the Place de l’Église, fostering artistic exchange and community engagement each summer.
- Les Journées de la culture is a city-wide cultural celebration held each September, offering a variety of free activities and performances for all ages and encouraging participation in the arts.
- Seasonal events such as the Marché du Noël d’Antan, one of the region's traditional Christmas markets, combine cultural heritage with festive activities and artisanal displays.

Cap-Santé's cultural calendar also frequently includes music recitals, family film screenings, and community-based performances, mostly hosted at Salle Albert-Fortier.

== Government ==
List of former mayors:

- Jean-Baptiste Paquet (1856-1857)
- Louis Leclerc (1857-1858)
- Isidore Morisette (1858-1862)
- Louis Leclerc (1862-1865)
- Melville Bernard (1865-1868)
- F.-X Frenette (1868-1870)
- H.-Q. de St-Georges (1870-1872)
- Joseph-Élie Thibaudeau (1872-1878)
- Camille Germain (1878-1903)
- J-Léandre Frenette (1903-1906)
- Samuel Germain (1906-1907)
- Gaudefroid Gaudin (1907-1908)
- Félix-Ferdinand Leclerc (1908-1911)
- Eugène Lesage (1911-1919)
- Charles Germain (1919-1925)
- Diogène Doré (1925-1933)
- Alfred Derôme dit Descarreau (1933-1937)
- Lorenzo Lavallée (1937-1969)
- Richard Piché (1969-1971)
- Jean Ricard (1971-1979)
- Roger Dussault (1979-1999)
- Jean-Yves Nobert (1999–2005)
- Jeanne Noreau (2005-2009)
- Jean-Yves Nobert (2009–2013)
- Denis Jobin (2013-2018)
- Michel Blackburn (2018–present)
