= Portneuf Regional County Municipality =

Portneuf
- Regional county municipality
- Coordinates: 46°53′N 71°55′W
- Country: Canada
- Province: Quebec
- Region: Capitale-Nationale
- Effective: January 1, 1982
- County seat: Cap-Santé
- Municipalities: List: Cap-Santé; Saint-Raymond; Donnacona; Pont-Rouge; Neuville; Saint-Marc-des-Carrières; Deschambault-Grondines; Portneuf; Saint-Basile; Saint-Léonard; Lac-Sergent; Sainte-Christine-d'Auvergne; Rivière-à-Pierre; Saint-Gilbert; Saint-Alban; Saint-Casimir; Saint-Thuribe; Saint-Ubalde

Government
  - Type: Prefecture
  - Prefect: Denis Langlois

Area
  - Total: 4,125.10 km^{2} (1,592.71 sq mi)
  - Land: 3,923.70 km^{2} (1,514.95 sq mi)

Population (2016)
  - Total: 53,008
  - Density: 13.5/km^{2} (35/sq mi)
  - Change 2011-2016: ▲7.4%
  - Dwellings: 26,586
- Time zone: UTC−5 (EST)
  - Summer (DST): UTC−4 (EDT)
- Area codes: 418 and 581
- Website: www.portneuf.com

Portneuf (French pronunciation: [pɔʁnœf]) is a regional county municipality (RCM) in the Capitale-Nationale administrative region of Quebec, Canada. RCM of Portneuf has been established on January 1, 1982. It is composed of 21 municipalities: nine cities, seven municipalities, two parishes and three unorganized territories. The county seat is located in Cap-Santé.

== History ==
The Regional County Municipality of Portneuf was constituted as a regional administrative entity on November 25, 1981, by a Provincial decree creating the supralocal Regional County Municipality administration based on the (...) and therefore replacing the previously existing historic Portneuf County Corporation. While the new administrative boundary included most of the communities from its previous historic limits, a few municipalities were merged with bordering entities: St-Augustin-de-Desmaures, Sainte-Catherine-de-Portneuf, Notre-Dame-de-Montauban, Quebec. Those municipalities yet remained within the Electoral Federal Riding of Portneuf District (all but Notre-Dame-de-Montauban).

The administrative county seat remained in Cap-Santé while moving from the County Corporation building to a newly built one located further east on 185, Route 138 at a slight distance from the historic village of Cap-Santé.

== Subdivisions ==
There are 21 subdivisions within the RCM:

Cities & Towns (9)

- Cap-Santé
- Donnacona
- Lac-Sergent
- Neuville
- Pont-Rouge
- Portneuf
- Saint-Basile
- Saint-Marc-des-Carrières
- Saint-Raymond

Municipalities (7)

- Deschambault-Grondines
- Rivière-à-Pierre
- Saint-Alban
- Saint-Casimir
- Sainte-Christine-d'Auvergne
- Saint-Léonard-de-Portneuf
- Saint-Ubalde

Parishes (2)

- Saint-Gilbert
- Saint-Thuribe

Unorganized Territory (3)

- Lac-Blanc
- Lac-Lapeyrère
- Linton

== Transportation ==
=== Access Routes ===
Highways and numbered routes that run through the municipality, including external routes that start or finish at the county border:

- Autoroutes
  - A-40
- Principal Highways
  - R-138
- Secondary Highways
  - R-354
  - R-358
  - R-363
  - R-365
  - R-367
- External Routes
  - None

== See also ==
- List of regional county municipalities and equivalent territories in Quebec
- Portneuf County, Quebec
