= Saint-Gilbert, Quebec =

Saint-Gilbert
- Parish municipality
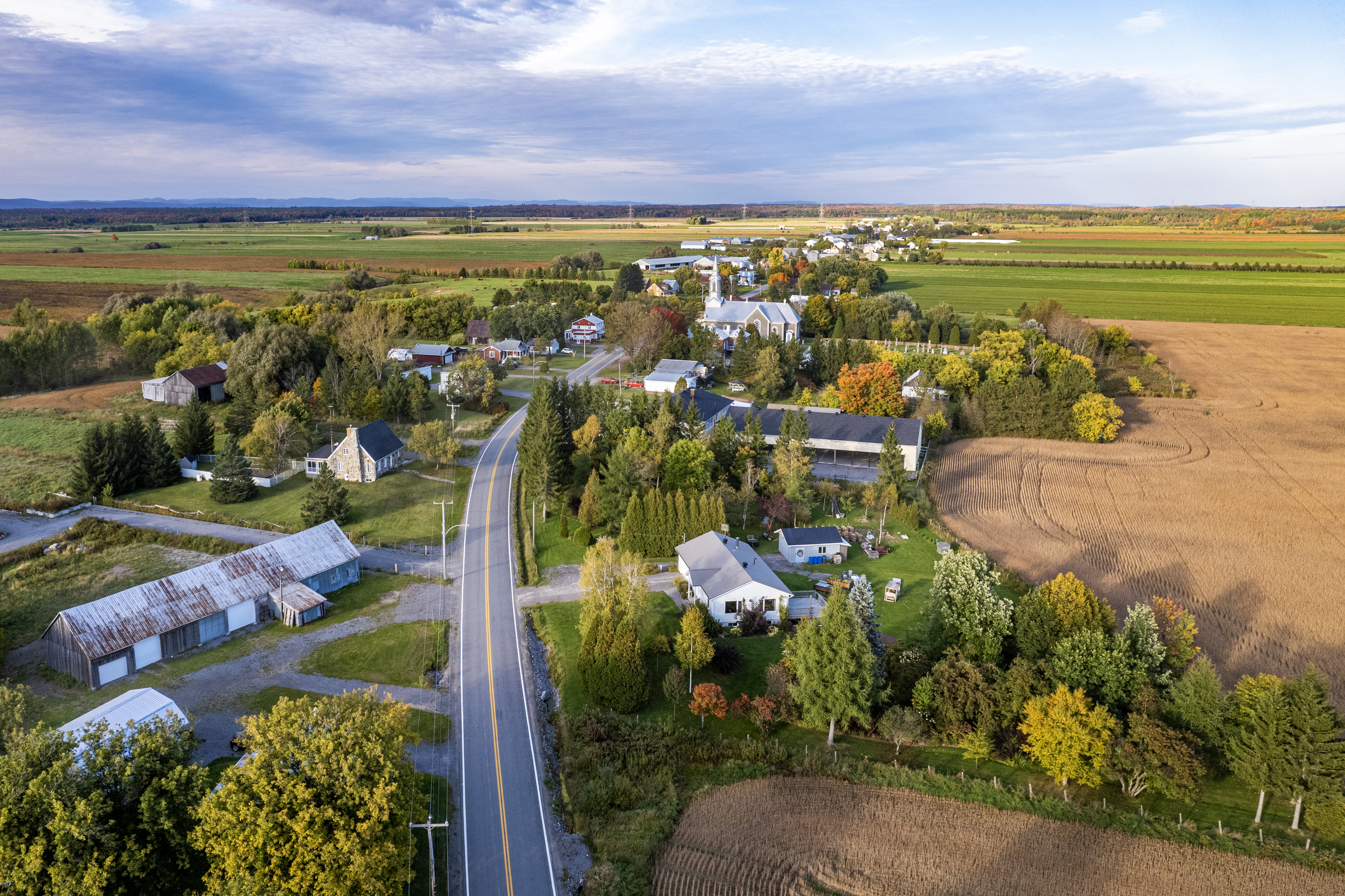
- Motto: Aime et Partage
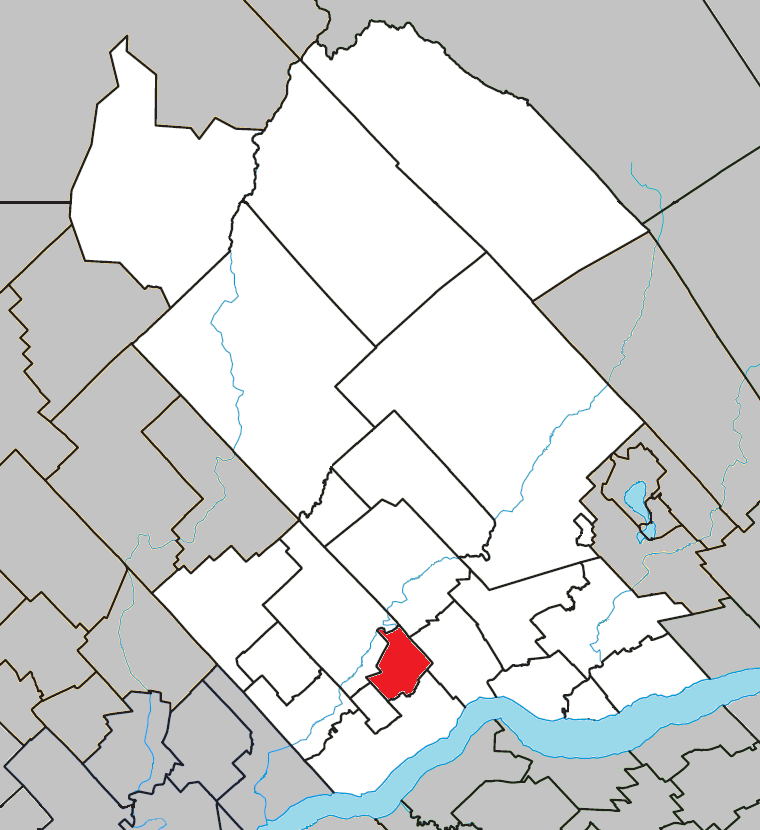
- Location within Portneuf RCM

- Location in central Quebec
- Coordinates: 46°43′N 72°00′W
- Country: Canada
- Province: Quebec
- Region: Capitale-Nationale
- RCM: Portneuf
- Constituted: April 27, 1893

Government
  - Mayor: Daniel Perron
  - Fed. riding: Saint-Augustin—Portneuf—Jacques-Cartier
  - Prov. riding: Portneuf

Area
  - Total: 37.76 km^{2} (14.58 sq mi)
  - Land: 37.44 km^{2} (14.46 sq mi)

Population (2021)
  - Total: 283
  - Density: 7.6/km^{2} (20/sq mi)
  - Pop (2016-21): ▼4.4%
  - Dwellings: 122
- Time zone: UTC−5 (EST)
  - Summer (DST): UTC−4 (EDT)
- Postal code(s): G0A 3T0
- Area codes: 418, 581
- Highways: R-354
- Website: www.saint-gilbert.ca

Saint-Gilbert (French pronunciation: [sɛ̃ ʒilbɛʁ]) is a parish municipality of about 280 people in the Portneuf Regional County Municipality in the Capitale-Nationale region of Quebec, Canada. It has the smallest population of all municipalities in Portneuf RCM (other than unorganized territories).

== History ==
In 1893, the Parish of Saint-Gilbert was formed, named in honour of Gilbert Frenette, an early settler who had donated the land on which the parish church was to be built. That same year, the Parish Municipality of Saint-Gilbert was created out of territory ceded by Saint-Alban and Saint-Joseph-de-Deschambault, and its post office opened.

== Demographics ==
In the 2021 Census of Population conducted by Statistics Canada, Saint-Gilbert had a population of 283 living in 117 of its 122 total private dwellings, a change of −4.4% from its 2016 population of 296. With a land area of 37.44 km^{2} (14.46 sq mi), it had a population density of 7.6/km^{2} (19.6/sq mi) in 2021.

Historical census populations – Saint-Gilbert, Quebec

Year	Pop.	±%
1901	469	—
1911	466	−0.6%
1921	506	+8.6%
1931	423	−16.4%
1941	414	−2.1%
1951	437	+5.6%
1956	414	−5.3%

Year	Pop.	±%
1961	375	−9.4%
1966	370	−1.3%
1971	345	−6.8%
1976	286	−17.1%
1981	312	+9.1%
1986	316	+1.3%
1991	315	−0.3%

Year	Pop.	±%
1996	323	+2.5%
2001	294	−9.0%
2006	292	−0.7%
2011	282	−3.4%
2016	296	+5.0%
2021	283	−4.4%

Source: Statistics Canada

Mother tongue (2021):

- English as first language: 0%
- French as first language: 98.2%
- English and French as first languages: 0%
- Other as first language: 0%
