= Saint-Marc-des-Carrières =

- City
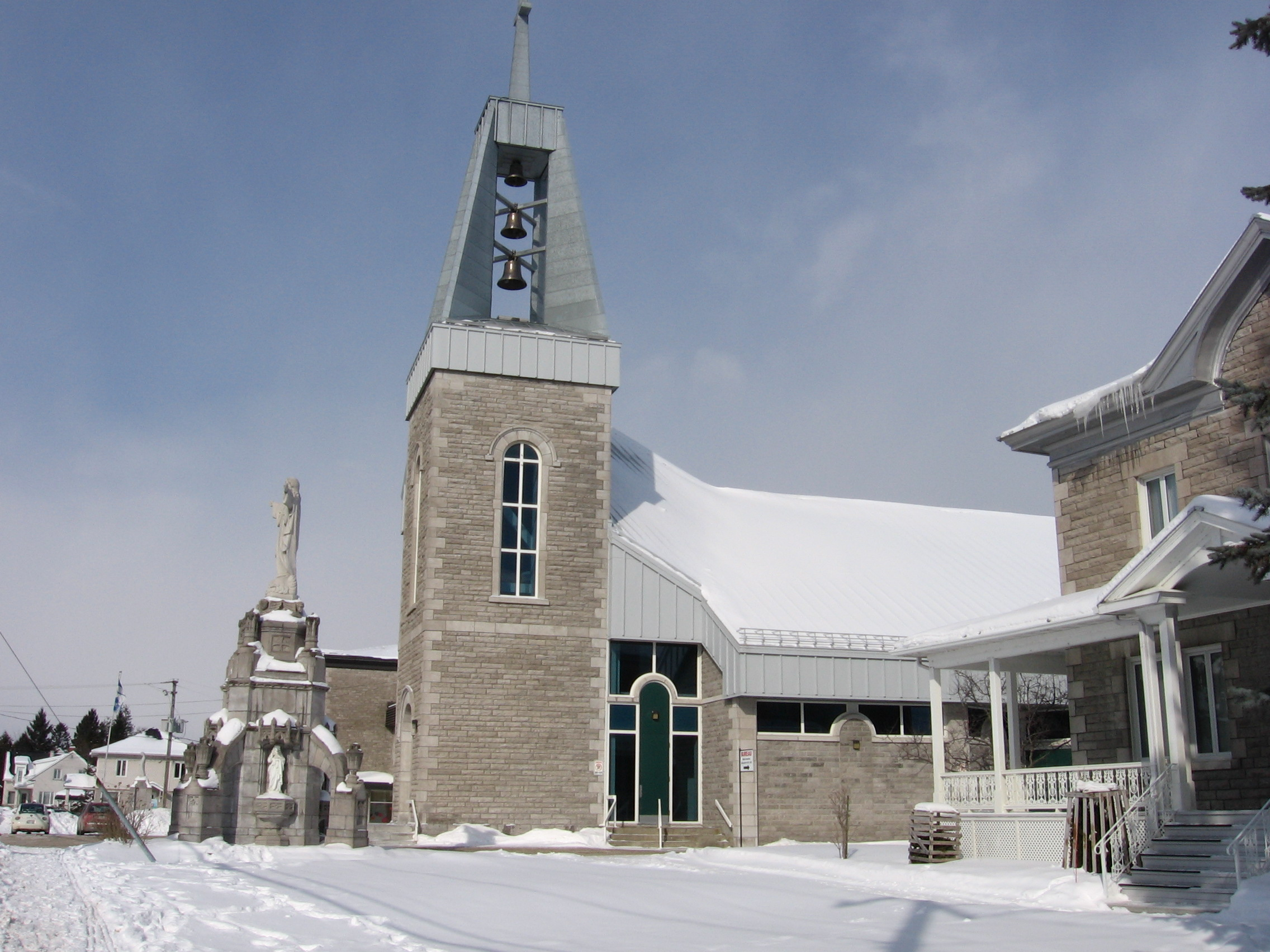

- Coat of arms
- Motto: Sagesse que de Gouverner sans Violence ([it is] wisdom to govern without violence)
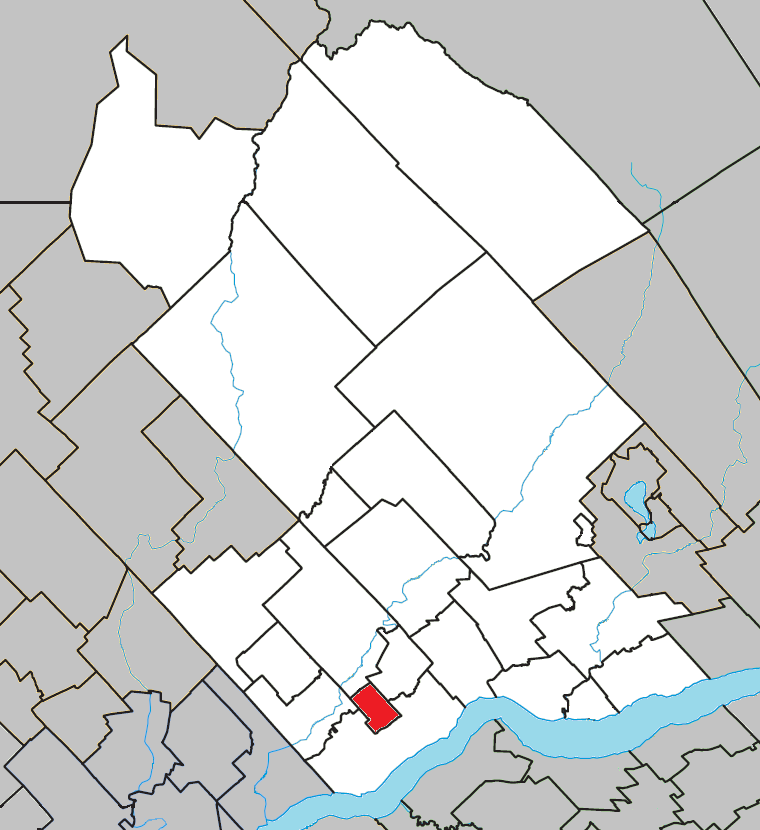
- Location within Portneuf RCM

- Location in central Quebec
- Coordinates: 46°41′N 72°03′W
- Country: Canada
- Province: Quebec
- Region: Capitale-Nationale
- RCM: Portneuf
- Settled: 1806
- Constituted: October 24, 1918

Government
  - Mayor: Maryon Leclerc
  - Fed. riding: Saint-Augustin—Portneuf—Jacques-Cartier
  - Prov. riding: Portneuf

Area
  - City: 17.68 km^{2} (6.83 sq mi)
  - Land: 17.29 km^{2} (6.68 sq mi)
  - Urban: 2.61 km^{2} (1.01 sq mi)

Population (2021)
  - City: 2,901
  - Density: 167.8/km^{2} (435/sq mi)
  - Urban: 2,005
  - Urban density: 768.6/km^{2} (1,991/sq mi)
  - Pop (2016-21): ▼0.3%
  - Dwellings: 1,393
- Time zone: UTC−5 (EST)
  - Summer (DST): UTC−4 (EDT)
- Postal code(s): G0A 4B0
- Area codes: 418, 581
- Highways: R-363
- Website: www.st-marc-des-carrieres.qc.ca

Saint-Marc-des-Carrières (French pronunciation: [sɛ̃ maʁ(k) de kaʁjɛʁ]) is a town in Quebec, Canada, part of Portneuf Regional County Municipality in the Capitale-Nationale region.

The place has earned the title of Rock Capital of Portneuf County because of its rock quarries that have played a significant role in the local economy. Even its name makes reference to these quarries (carrière means "quarry").

== History ==
Since the early 19th century, the area has been known for its quarries of Trenton Limestone, that was used for many construction projects in that time period. The village, first known as Poiré, got its post office in 1863. By 1901, the place was called Châteauvert, in honour of Georges Châteauvert, who was postmaster, owner of the rock quarries, and first mayor from 1901 to 1903. That same year, the Parish of Saint-Marc-des-Carrières was formed by separating from Saint-Alban, Grondines, and Saint-Joseph-de-Deschambault. A year later, it became a civil parish. After 1911, the village was called by its parish name. In 1918, the place was incorporated as the Village Municipality of Saint-Marc-des-Carrières.

On June 12, 2004, Saint-Marc-des-Carrières gained city status.

== Geography ==
=== Climate ===
Saint-Marc-des-Carrières has a humid continental climate with vast seasonal differences. Summers are mild and moderated by its proximity to the Gulf of Saint Lawrence. In winter, interior Canada influences the climate with frequent cold waves.

Climate data for Saint-Marc-des-Carrières
Month	Jan	Feb	Mar	Apr	May	Jun	Jul	Aug	Sep	Oct	Nov	Dec	Year
Record high °C (°F)	11 (52)	12 (54)	17.2 (63.0)	31 (88)	32.5 (90.5)	34.5 (94.1)	36.1 (97.0)	35 (95)	34 (93)	27.8 (82.0)	23 (73)	13 (55)	36.1 (97.0)
Mean daily maximum °C (°F)	−7.3 (18.9)	−4.4 (24.1)	1.7 (35.1)	9.9 (49.8)	18 (64)	23.1 (73.6)	25.6 (78.1)	24.5 (76.1)	19.2 (66.6)	11.5 (52.7)	4 (39)	−3.5 (25.7)	10.2 (50.4)
Daily mean °C (°F)	−12.7 (9.1)	−10.2 (13.6)	−4 (25)	3.3 (37.9)	11.6 (52.9)	16.8 (62.2)	19.5 (67.1)	18.3 (64.9)	13.4 (56.1)	6.6 (43.9)	0.1 (32.2)	−8 (18)	4.7 (40.5)
Mean daily minimum °C (°F)	−18.1 (−0.6)	−16.1 (3.0)	−9.7 (14.5)	−1.1 (30.0)	5.2 (41.4)	10.5 (50.9)	13.4 (56.1)	12.2 (54.0)	7.6 (45.7)	1.8 (35.2)	−3.9 (25.0)	−12.5 (9.5)	−0.9 (30.4)
Record low °C (°F)	−44 (−47)	−43.3 (−45.9)	−33.5 (−28.3)	−20 (−4)	−7.8 (18.0)	−2.2 (28.0)	1.7 (35.1)	−1.1 (30.0)	−6.5 (20.3)	−11.1 (12.0)	−26.1 (−15.0)	−37.2 (−35.0)	−44 (−47)
Average precipitation mm (inches)	66.9 (2.63)	56.4 (2.22)	66.2 (2.61)	81.7 (3.22)	103 (4.1)	116.5 (4.59)	138.4 (5.45)	107.7 (4.24)	120.5 (4.74)	107.1 (4.22)	86.4 (3.40)	84.8 (3.34)	1,135.7 (44.71)
Average rainfall mm (inches)	17.3 (0.68)	13.9 (0.55)	29.3 (1.15)	74.3 (2.93)	102.6 (4.04)	116.5 (4.59)	138.4 (5.45)	107.7 (4.24)	120.4 (4.74)	106.1 (4.18)	66.1 (2.60)	31.5 (1.24)	924.2 (36.39)
Average snowfall cm (inches)	49.6 (19.5)	42.5 (16.7)	36.9 (14.5)	7.4 (2.9)	0.1 (0.0)	0 (0)	0 (0)	0 (0)	0 (0)	1 (0.4)	20.3 (8.0)	53.3 (21.0)	211.1 (83.1)
Average precipitation days (≥ 0.2 mm)	13.3	11.5	11.5	11.5	13.8	13.3	14.1	12.9	12.7	13.3	12.9	14.3	155.1
Average rainy days (≥ 0.2 mm)	2	1.6	4.6	10.3	13.7	13.3	14.1	12.9	12.7	13.1	9	3.6	110.9
Average snowy days (≥ 0.2 cm)	12.3	10.3	7.6	2.1	0.1	0	0	0	0	0.5	4.6	11.4	48.9
Mean monthly sunshine hours	103.5	123.8	148.1	165	209.4	232.4	238.8	215	155.9	116.1	86.7	81.8	1,876.5
Source: Environment Canada

== Demographics ==
In the 2021 Census of Population conducted by Statistics Canada, Saint-Marc-des-Carrières had a population of 2,901 living in 1,342 of its 1,393 total private dwellings, a change of −0.3% from its 2016 population of 2,911. With a land area of 17.29 km^{2} (6.68 sq mi), it had a population density of 167.8/km^{2} (434.6/sq mi) in 2021.

Historical census populations – Saint-Marc-des-Carrières, Quebec

Year	Pop.	±%
1921	1,492	—
1931	1,997	+33.8%
1941	2,118	+6.1%
1951	2,351	+11.0%
1956	2,457	+4.5%
1961	2,622	+6.7%

Year	Pop.	±%
1966	2,681	+2.3%
1971	2,650	−1.2%
1976	2,625	−0.9%
1981	2,822	+7.5%
1986	2,804	−0.6%
1991	2,844	+1.4%

Year	Pop.	±%
1996	2,955	+3.9%
2001	2,855	−3.4%
2006	2,774	−2.8%
2011	2,862	+3.2%
2016	2,911	+1.7%
2021	2,901	−0.3%

Population counts are not adjusted for boundary changes and mergers.
Source: Statistics Canada

Mother tongue (2021):

- English as first language: 0.7%
- French as first language: 97.7%
- English and French as first language: 0.4%
- Other as first language: 0.9%

== Notable people ==
- Jean-Louis Frenette : member of the House of Commons of Canada
- Chantal Petitclerc : paralympic athlete
