= Deschambault-Grondines =

- Municipality
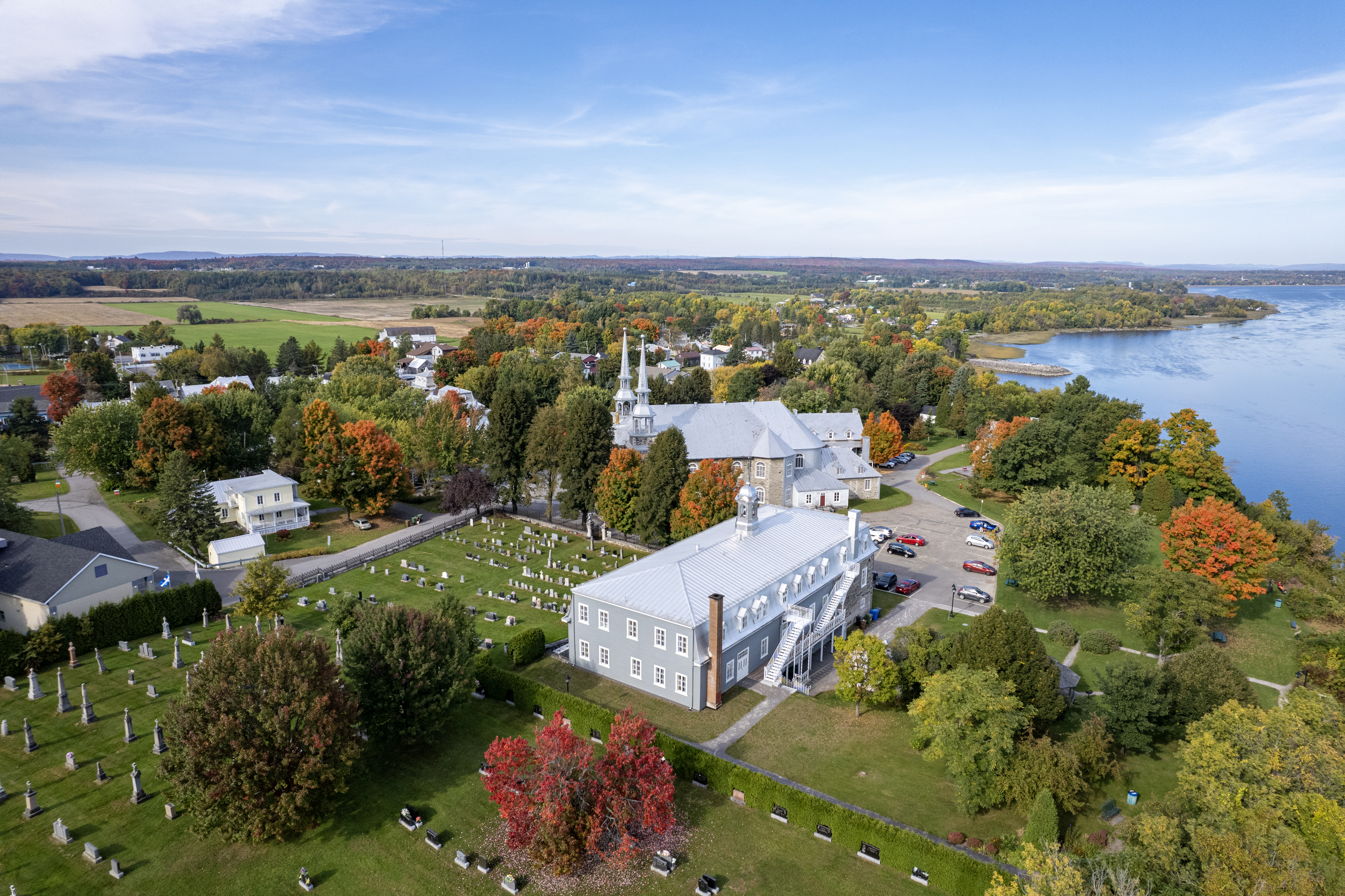

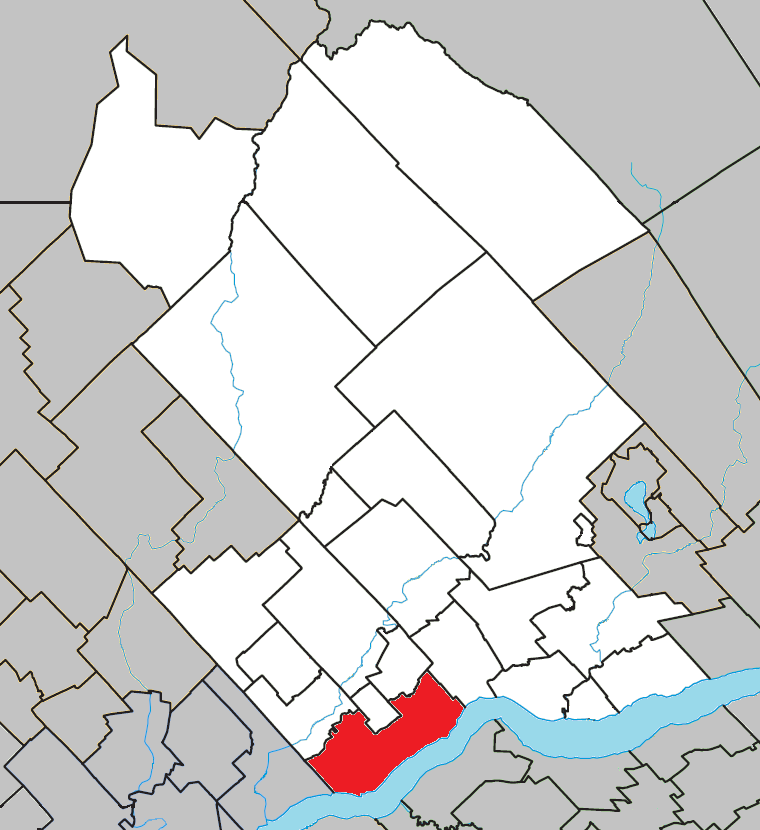
- Location within Portneuf RCM

- Location in central Quebec
- Coordinates: 46°39′N 71°56′W
- Country: Canada
- Province: Quebec
- Region: Capitale-Nationale
- RCM: Portneuf
- Constituted: 27 February 2002
- Named for: Jacques-Alexis de Fleury Deschambault and gronder

Government
  - Mayor: Sylvain Ouimet
  - Fed. riding: Saint-Augustin—Portneuf—Jacques-Cartier
  - Prov. riding: Portneuf

Area
  - Total: 152.36 km^{2} (58.83 sq mi)
  - Land: 124.02 km^{2} (47.88 sq mi)

Population (2021)
  - Total: 2,235
  - Density: 18/km^{2} (47/sq mi)
  - Pop (2016–21): ▲0.7%
  - Dwellings: 1,169
- Time zone: UTC−5 (EST)
  - Summer (DST): UTC−4 (EDT)
- Postal code(s): G0A 1S0
- Area codes: 418, 581
- Highways A-40: R-138 R-363
- Website: deschambault-grondines.com

Deschambault-Grondines (French pronunciation: [deʃɑ̃bo ɡʁɔ̃din]) is a municipality located in the Portneuf Regional County Municipality (RCM), in the Capitale-Nationale region, Quebec, Canada.

Deschambault-Grondines was created in 2002 by the merger of the villages of Deschambault and Grondines. It is a member of the Fédération des Villages-relais du Québec.'

== History ==
=== Deschambault ===
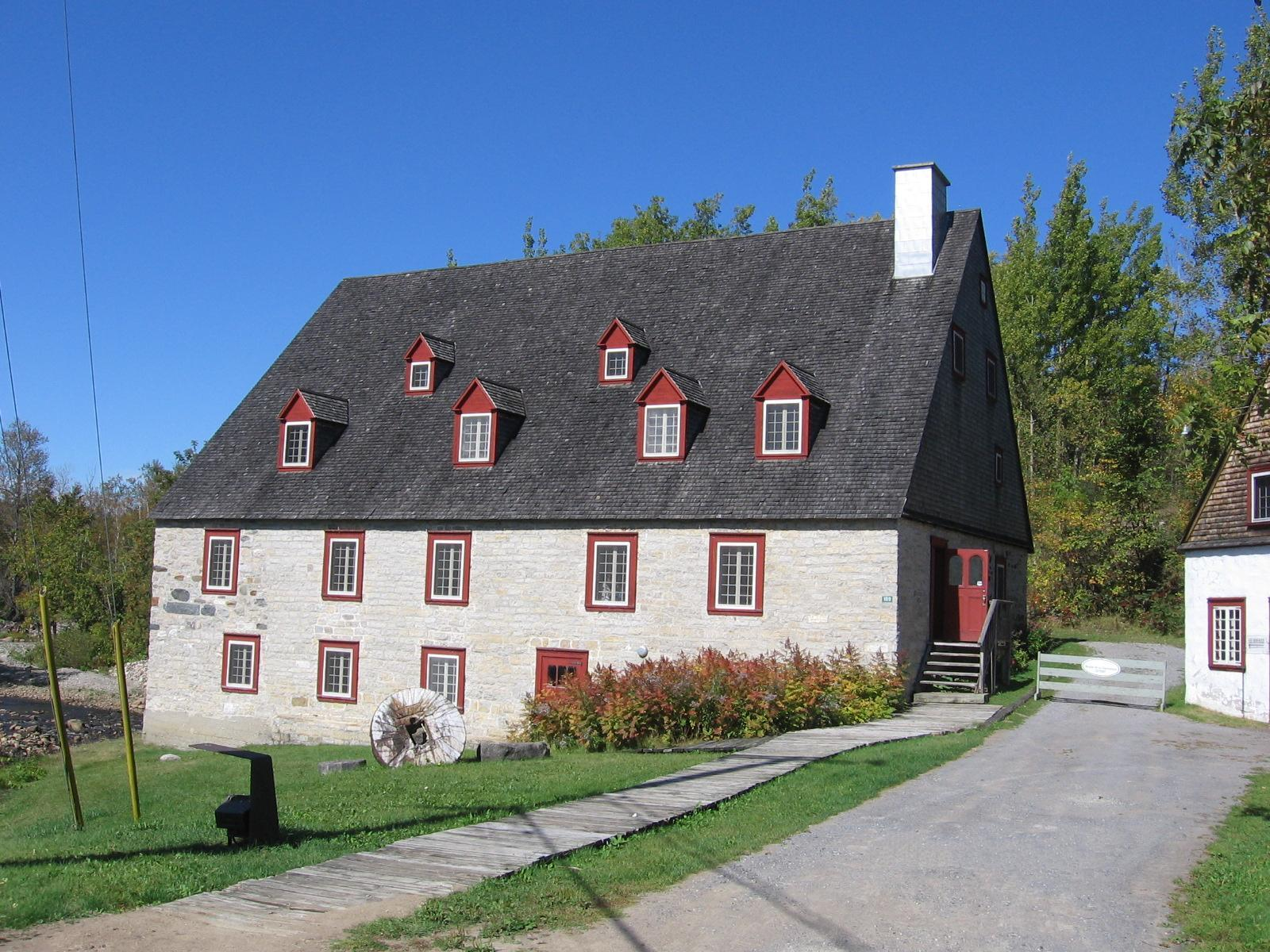
Water mill built in 1802 by Seigneur Joseph Chavigny de la Chevrotière.

The village of Deschambault is located in the eastern part of the municipality. It has its origins in the Seigneurie de Chavigny, granted in 1640 by the Compagnie de la Nouvelle-France. In 1671, Jacques-Alexis Fleury, Sieur Deschambault, married the heiress of the seigneury and became its owner in 1683 through an exchange of land. He then gave his name to his new domain. The parish of Saint-Joseph-de-Deschambault was founded in 1713 and canonically erected in 1753. The parish municipality was created in 1855, and the village municipality separated from it in 1951. These two entities merged again in 1989.'

. . . At one time, Deschambault was said to have "a pilot every two houses." Very early on "the taste for the sea" developed there, because the St. Lawrence has long been the only way to access the village. "Everything was happening on the river !" says Father Jacques Paquin, coordinator of the Deschambault Navigators Committee." Even after the opening of the Chemin du Roy, a route considered difficult, the seaway continued to be used more than the land route. Deschambault, a village of sailors, Le Soleil. Translated from French.

=== Grondines ===
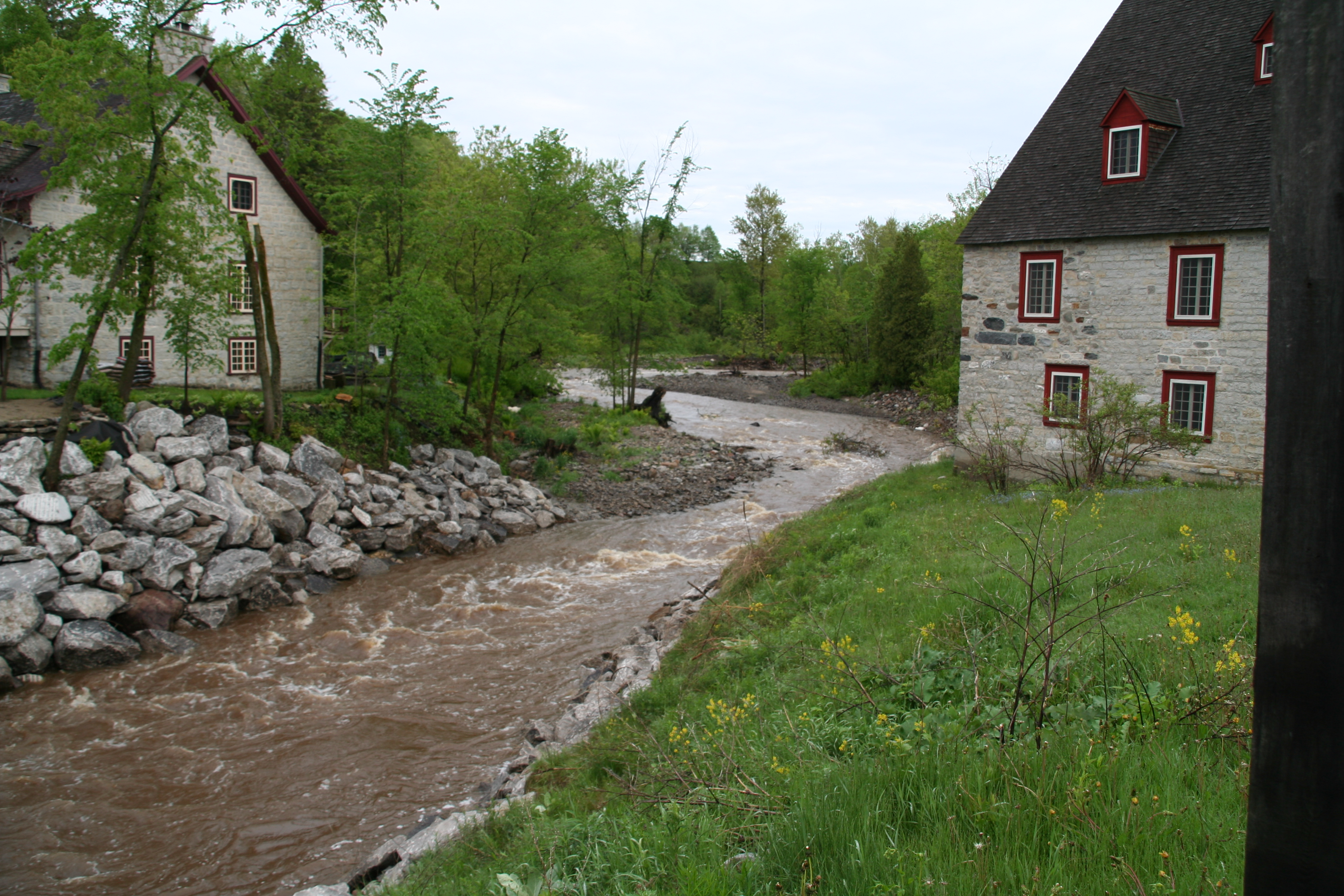
La Chevrotière River, La Chevrotière Watermill, rue de Chavigny

The name Grondines was named by Samuel de Champlain himself in 1674. "Grondines" is from the French verb "gronder", meaning to rumble or roar.

The 'seigneurie des Grondines' was one of the oldest lordship in the province of Quebec, and was initially granted in 1637 by the Company of New France to Duchess Marie-Madeleine de Vignerot de Pontcourlay, Dame d'atours of Marie de' Medici, and niece of Cardinal Richelieu, chief minister of Louis XIV.

The estate covered a land area of around 90 square miles or nearly 60,000 acres.' In 1646, the Governor of New-France at the time, Charles Jacques Huault de Montmagny, gave the concession to the nuns hospitallers, administrators of Hôtel-Dieu de Québec, and thereafter, it was resold in 1683 to Lord Jacques Aubert. Being the father-in-law of Louis Hamelin, the next lord of Grondines, the lordship passed to the Hamelin family afterwards, and was transmitted to their descendants until 1797, following the British Conquest. In 1698, comte Louis de Buade of Château Frontenac award them concessions, extending their lordship with additional islands and isles. This family was one of the eight seigneurial dynasties that lived permanently on their estate for six generations.

Over time, the Hamelins married members of the French-Canadian nobility. The families were the Couillard de l'Espinay, the Denys de la Ronde, partners of Charles Aubert de La Chesnaye, the Fleury d'Eschambault, the Gaultier de Varennes, the Lorimier de la Rivière, the Chavigny de la Chevrotière, and their in-laws included the Barons Le Moyne de Longueuil, the Pézard de Champlain, and the Boucher de Montarville.'

A member of this family was also recognized as noble by the Sovereign Council of New France of Louis XIV in 1654, and would join the French-Canadian nobility, being the lord and commander Jacques-François Hamelin de Bourgchemin et de l'Hermitière, a descendant of Jacques Hamelin, bishop of Tulle.' In 1766, a member of the Hamelin de Chavigny also appeared in documents of the Canadian nobility, where they asked the king to keep in power the current Governor of Quebec James Murray, with the hope of being less penalized by the injustices they had to suffer after the British conquest.

The signatories, including A. Hamelin, were Luc de la Corne, François-Joseph Cugnet, Aubert de Gaspé, Antoine Juchereau Duchesnay, and a few others. The last lord of Grondines was Senator David Edward Price in 1871, a member of the influential Price family.

The Grondines windmill was built and is the oldest windmill in Quebec.

== Geography ==
=== St. Lawrence River ===
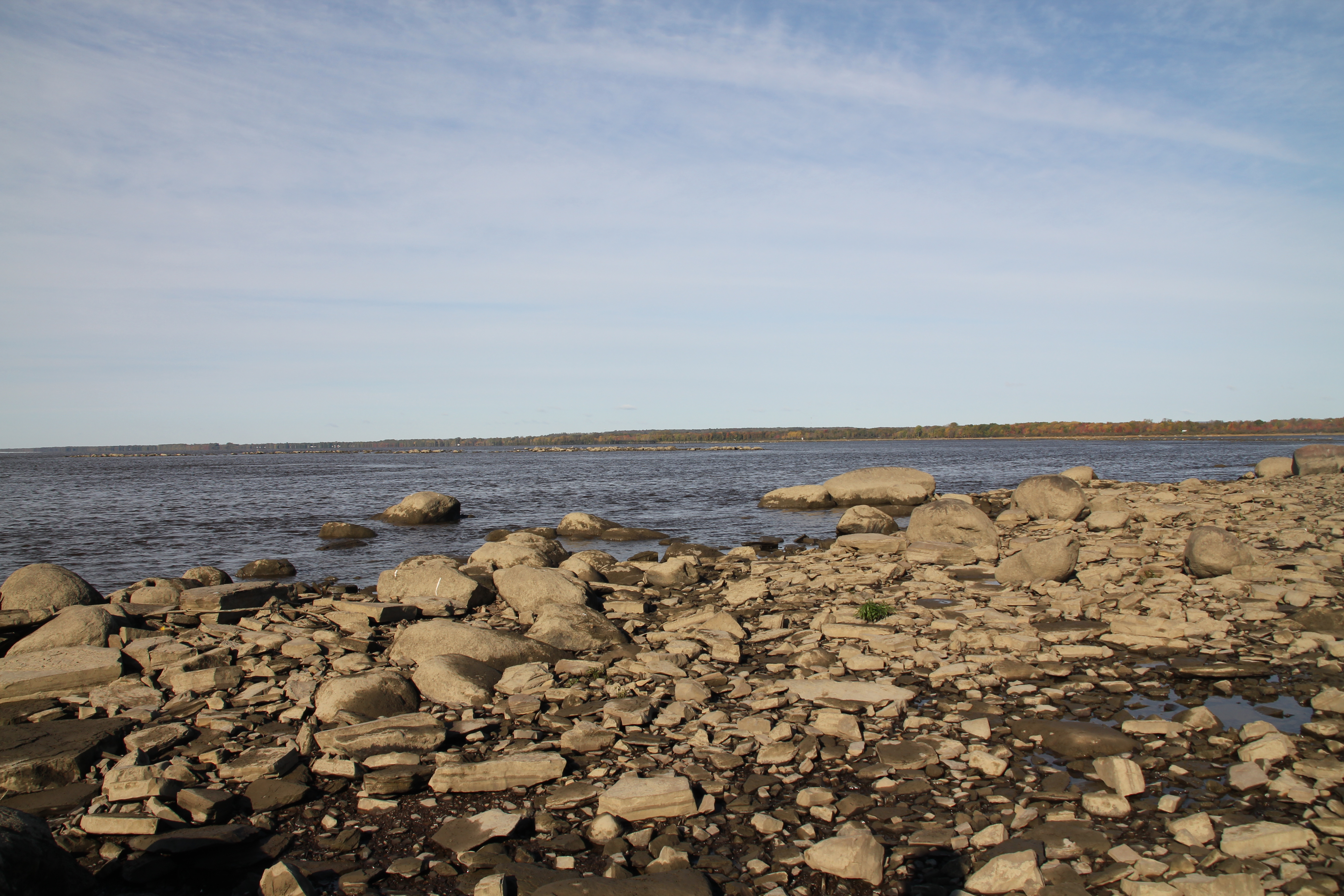
Grande Pointe-des-Grondines

In canoes, made of birch bark or carved out of a tree trunk, First Nations have crisscrossed the St. Lawrence River from west to east, from the Great Lakes to the Atlantic Ocean and all the rivers of the Americas, from north to south, from the Arctic to Tierra del Fuego, for millennia. Indigenous peoples knew the advantages, irritants, barriers and dangers of waterways long before the arrival of Europeans and Jacques Cartier (1491-1557).

Opposite Cape Lauzon, in the middle of the St. Lawrence River, the Richelieu Rapids stretch for a distance of nearly 2 km. These rapids, which are virtually invisible, correspond to a narrowing of the channel, marked, especially at low tide, by a much stronger current than anywhere else on the St. Lawrence downstream of Montreal.'

The Richelieu Rapids have played a strategic role in the history of Cape Lauzon, Deschambault, and of Quebec more broadly.

The St. Lawrence River limits the territory of Portneuf regional County (RCM) for nearly 70 km. Along the Chemin du Roi, from one village to another, several spaces allow you to rest, visit, picnic, fish, observe birds, dip your toes in the water. The main attraction remains the docks.

In Grondines, the tip of the Anse des Grondines, also known in the vernacular: La Grande Pointe, Pointe de la Laille or Grande pointe de la Laille. The word laille could come from the English light, since there was a lighthouse at the end of the island.

According to historian Raymond Douville, this point is the origin of the name Grondines, probably given by the boaters who had to go around, at the rising tide, the many pebbles that the waves hit in dull roars and whose echoes resonated on the escarpments of the coast.

- Tide Table, Government of Canada, Statons Grondines - 03325
- Atlas of Tidal Currents, Fisheries and Oceans Canada, from Grondines to Portneuf, pages 96 to 107

=== Ecology ===
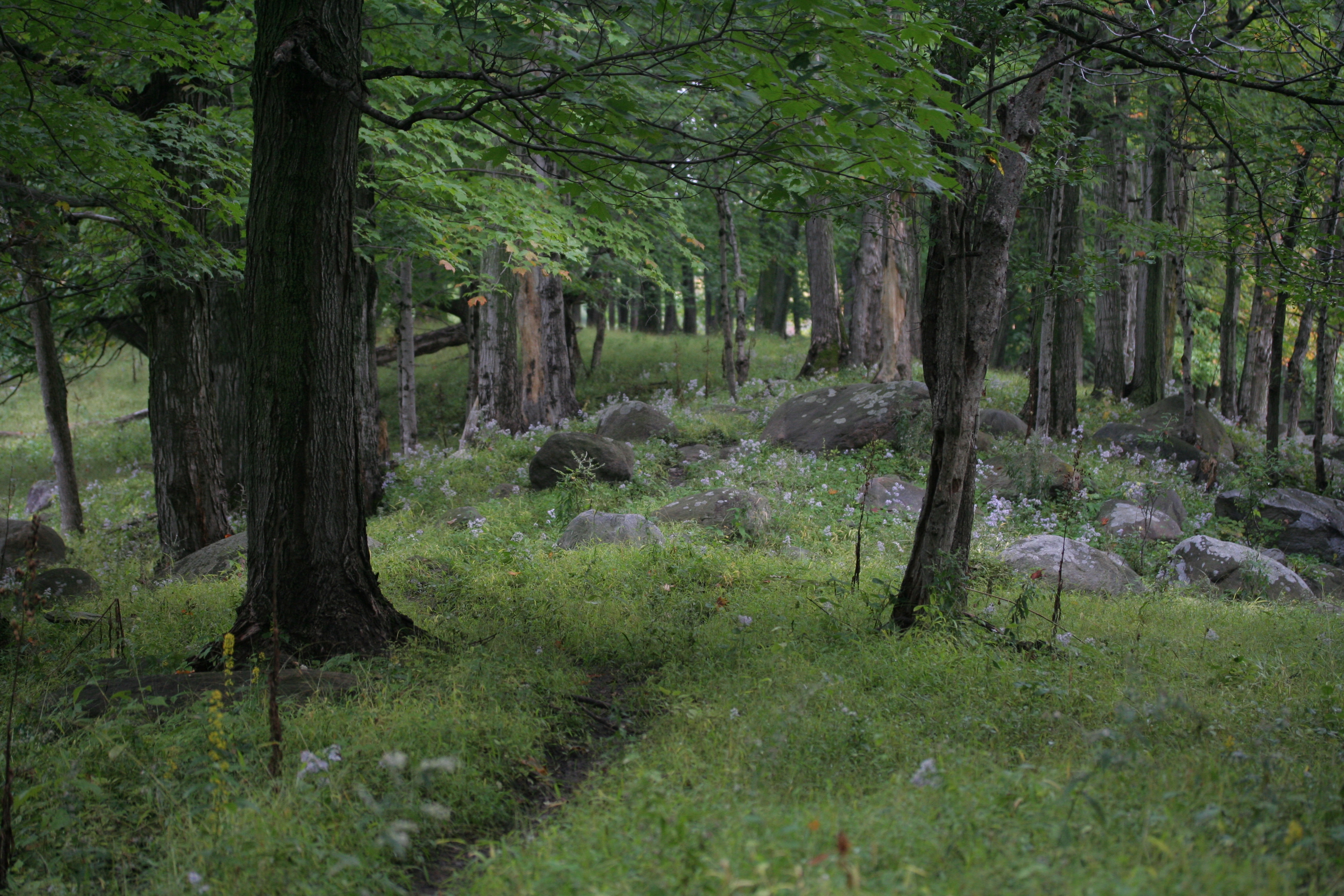
Undergrowth flora, chain of rocks, Grondines

« . . . The Grondines and Sainte-Anne-de-la-Pérade swamp is one of the last, large, treed swamps on the river. It extends along seven kilometres of shoreline in the St. Lawrence River’s freshwater estuary. The swamp shelters several at-risk species, including plants that are endemic to the freshwater estuary. It is a rare biodiversity hot spot on a global scale, according to the Atlas de la biodiversité du Québec (Quebec biodiversity atlas). »

The Grondines and Sainte-Anne-de-la-Pérade Swamp, A unique ecosystem.

=== Climate ===
Climate data for Deschambault-Grondines
Month	Jan	Feb	Mar	Apr	May	Jun	Jul	Aug	Sep	Oct	Nov	Dec	Year
Record high °C (°F)	9.0 (48.2)	9.0 (48.2)	16.0 (60.8)	30.5 (86.9)	33.0 (91.4)	34.5 (94.1)	34.0 (93.2)	34.4 (93.9)	33.0 (91.4)	26.0 (78.8)	21.0 (69.8)	13.0 (55.4)	34.5 (94.1)
Mean daily maximum °C (°F)	−7.3 (18.9)	−5.0 (23.0)	0.8 (33.4)	9.1 (48.4)	17.4 (63.3)	22.8 (73.0)	25.1 (77.2)	24.1 (75.4)	19.1 (66.4)	11.5 (52.7)	4.0 (39.2)	−3.4 (25.9)	9.9 (49.8)
Daily mean °C (°F)	−12.1 (10.2)	−10.3 (13.5)	−4.1 (24.6)	4.3 (39.7)	11.7 (53.1)	16.9 (62.4)	19.5 (67.1)	18.6 (65.5)	13.8 (56.8)	7.2 (45.0)	0.6 (33.1)	−7.4 (18.7)	4.9 (40.8)
Mean daily minimum °C (°F)	−17 (1)	−15.5 (4.1)	−9.0 (15.8)	−0.5 (31.1)	5.9 (42.6)	11.0 (51.8)	13.9 (57.0)	13.0 (55.4)	8.5 (47.3)	2.9 (37.2)	−2.8 (27.0)	−11.4 (11.5)	−0.1 (31.8)
Record low °C (°F)	−38.5 (−37.3)	−35 (−31)	−31.5 (−24.7)	−17.0 (1.4)	−4.0 (24.8)	−1.0 (30.2)	3.0 (37.4)	1.1 (34.0)	−5.5 (22.1)	−7.0 (19.4)	−24.0 (−11.2)	−35.0 (−31.0)	−38.5 (−37.3)
Average precipitation mm (inches)	77.0 (3.03)	70.0 (2.76)	69.1 (2.72)	85.4 (3.36)	100.5 (3.96)	110.4 (4.35)	125.5 (4.94)	108.5 (4.27)	116.5 (4.59)	107.8 (4.24)	95.6 (3.76)	91.9 (3.62)	1,158.1 (45.59)
Average rainfall mm (inches)	26.3 (1.04)	19.9 (0.78)	31.5 (1.24)	76.6 (3.02)	99.7 (3.93)	110.4 (4.35)	125.5 (4.94)	108.5 (4.27)	116.5 (4.59)	107.0 (4.21)	74.1 (2.92)	36.9 (1.45)	932.8 (36.72)
Average snowfall cm (inches)	50.7 (20.0)	50.1 (19.7)	37.6 (14.8)	9.0 (3.5)	0.8 (0.3)	0.0 (0.0)	0.0 (0.0)	0.0 (0.0)	0.0 (0.0)	0.8 (0.3)	21.5 (8.5)	55.0 (21.7)	225.5 (88.8)
Source: Environment Canada

== Demographics ==
In the 2021 Census of Population conducted by Statistics Canada, Deschambault-Grondines had a population of 2,235 living in 1,044 of its 1,169 total private dwellings, a change of 0.7% from its 2016 population of 2,220. With a land area of 124.02 km^{2} (47.88 sq mi), it had a population density of 18.0/km^{2} (46.7/sq mi) in 2021.

Historical census populations – Deschambault-Grondines
Year	Pop.	±%
2006	2,032	—
2011	2,131	+4.9%
2016	2,220	+4.2%
2021	2,235	+0.7%
Source: Statistics Canada

Private dwellings occupied by usual residents (2021): 1,044 (total dwellings: 1,169)

Mother tongue (2021):

- English as first language: 0.7%
- French as first language: 97.5%
- English and French as first languages: 0.4%
- Other as first language: 1.3%

== Attractions ==
- Saint-Joseph of Deschambault church, classed historical monument in 1964.
- The old presbytery of Deschambault, classed historical monument in 1965.
- The old mill of Grondines, classed archaeological monument in 1984.
- The church of Saint-Charles-Borromée in Grondines.
- Presbytery of Grondines, classed historical monument in 1966.
- House of the Grolo widow, classed historical monument in 1971.
- House of Delisle, classed historical monument in 1963.
- House of F.-R.-Neilson-Sewell, classed historical monument in 1978.
- The old Chevrotière Mill, classed historical monument in 1976.
