= Jacquot River =

Location
- Country: Canada
- Province: Quebec
- Region: Capitale-Nationale
- Regional County Municipality: Portneuf Regional County Municipality
- Municipalities: Saint-Léonard-de-Portneuf and Sainte-Christine-d'Auvergne

Physical characteristics
- Source: Simon Lake
  - location: Saint-Léonard-de-Portneuf, MRC Portneuf Regional County Municipality
  - coordinates: 46°54′08″N 72°02′08″W
  - elevation: 173 m (568 ft)
- Mouth: Sainte-Anne River
  - location: Sainte-Christine-d'Auvergne
  - coordinates: 46°48′37″N 72°00′00″W
  - elevation: 140 m (460 ft)
- Length: 22.4 km (13.9 mi)
- Discharge
  - location: Sainte-Christine-d'Auvergne

Basin features
- Tributaries
  - left: (Upward from the mouth) Ruisseau non identifié, ruisseau Vert, Rondeau River, ruisseau Noir.
  - right: (Upward from the mouth) Americaine River, décharge des Lacs du Castor, ruisseau non identifié, ruisseau Fontaine.

The Rivière Jacquot is a tributary of the Sainte-Anne River flowing in the municipalities of Saint-Léonard-de-Portneuf and Sainte-Christine-d'Auvergne, in the MRC Portneuf Regional County Municipality, in the administrative region of Capitale-Nationale, in Quebec, in Canada.

The upper part of the river is mainly served by the route 367 (chemin du rang Saint-Paul), by the chemin du rang Saint-Jacques and the chemin du rang Saint-Georges.

The main economic activities in the sector are forestry and agricultural activities.

The surface of the Jacquot River (except the rapids areas) is generally frozen from the beginning of December to the end of March, but the safe circulation on the ice is generally made from the end of December to the beginning of March.

== Geography ==
The Jacquot River originates from Lac Simon (length: 2.2 kilometres (1.4 mi); altitude 186 metres (610 ft)). The north shore of this lake has a resort vocation, located in a forest area in the northwestern part of the municipality of Saint-Léonard-de-Portneuf.

The mouth of this lake is located at:

- 4.1 kilometres (2.5 mi) south-west of the center of the hamlet Allen's Mill;
- 10.0 kilometres (6.2 mi) north-west of the village center of Sainte-Christine-d'Auvergne;
- 8.2 kilometres (5.1 mi) south-west of the village center of Saint-Léonard-de-Portneuf.

From its source, the course of the Jacquot River flows over 22.4 kilometres (13.9 mi) with a drop of 168 metres (551 ft), according to the following segments:

- 3.1 kilometres (1.9 mi) towards the northeast, in particular by crossing the Lac de l'Oasis (length: 1.2 kilometres (0.75 mi); altitude 168 metres (551 ft)) up to its mouth. Note: Lac de l'Oasis receives on the north side the black stream which drains in particular Lac à l'Ours, Lac en Coeur and Lac Bleu;
- 6.3 kilometres (3.9 mi) first towards the east, in particular by crossing the route 367 (chemin du rang Saint-Paul) and collecting Fontaine stream (coming from the south), then branching south-east to go around the mountain, to the confluence (coming from the north) of the Rondeau River;
- 2.1 kilometres (1.3 mi) to the south by collecting a stream (coming from the northwest), up to the Green stream (coming from the east);
- 1.9 kilometres (1.2 mi) to the south, branching west, to the outlet (coming from the northwest) of the Castor lakes;
- 2.5 kilometres (1.6 mi) to the south, forming several streamers at the end of the segment, up to the confluence (coming from the west) of the American river;
- 6.5 kilometres (4.0 mi) to the south, forming a few large streamers at the end of the segment, to its mouth.

The slope of the river is 4.16 metres per kilometre (22.0 ft/mi) and is relatively constant along the river.

After having cut the chemin du rang Saint-Georges, the Jacquot river flows on the northwest bank of the Sainte-Anne River at 2.8 kilometres (1.7 mi) downstream from the Cascades bridge. From there, the current descends on 55.0 kilometres (34.2 mi) generally south and southwest following the course of the Sainte-Anne River, to the northwest bank of the St. Lawrence River.

The use of the soil near the river is mainly forest and agricultural.

== Toponymy ==
The toponym Rivière Jacquot was formalized on December 5, 1968, at the Place Names Bank of the Commission de toponymie du Québec.

== See also ==
- Saint-Léonard-de-Portneuf
- Sainte-Christine-d'Auvergne
- Portneuf Regional County Municipality
- Rondeau River
- American River
- Sainte-Anne
- List of rivers of Quebec

== Bibliography ==
- CAPSA (2014). Water master plans of the intervention sectors of the CAPSA management area: Sainte-Anne, Portneuf and La Chevrotière (PDF) (in French). Quebec. p. 691. Archived from the original (PDF) on 2019-02-14.
