= Rondeau River =

- Location within Quebec

Location
- Country: Canada
- Province: Quebec
- Region: Capitale-Nationale
- Regional County Municipality: Portneuf Regional County Municipality
- Municipalities: Saint-Léonard-de-Portneuf

Physical characteristics
- Source: Bleu Lake
  - location: Saint-Léonard-de-Portneuf, MRC Portneuf Regional County Municipality
  - coordinates: 46°55′08″N 71°58′44″W
  - elevation: 232 m (761 ft)
- Mouth: Jacquot River
  - location: Saint-Léonard-de-Portneuf
  - coordinates: 46°55′08″N 71°58′44″W
  - elevation: 142 m (466 ft)
- Length: 7.8 km (4.8 mi)
- Basin size: 34.92 hectares (86.3 acres)
- Discharge
  - location: Saint-Léonard-de-Portneuf

Basin features
- Tributaries
  - left: (Upward from the mouth) Ruisseau Trudel, décharge d'un lac non identifié.

The Rondeau River is a tributary of the Jacquot River flowing in the municipality of Saint-Léonard-de-Portneuf, in the MRC Portneuf Regional County Municipality, in the administrative region of Capitale-Nationale, in Quebec, in Canada.

The upper part of the river is mainly served by the route 367 (chemin du rang Saint-Paul), by the chemin du rang Saint-Antoine and the route de la Traverse du 5e Rang.

The main economic activities in the sector are forestry and agricultural activities.

The surface of the Rondeau River (except the rapids zones) is generally frozen from the beginning of December to the end of March, but the safe circulation on the ice is generally made from the end of December to the beginning of March.

== Geography ==
The Rondeau River originates from Bleu Lake (length: 0.9 kilometres (0.56 mi); elevation 232 metres (761 ft)) which is enclosed between the mountains. The southeast shore of this lake has a resort vocation, located in a forest area in the northwest part of the municipality of Saint-Léonard-de-Portneuf. This lake is mainly fed by the outlet of Lac du Canard (coming from the southwest) and the outlet of Lac Vert (coming from the northwest).

From the mouth of Blue Lake, the Rondeau River flows over 7.8 kilometres (4.8 mi) with a drop of 90 metres (300 ft) according to the following segments:

- 1.4 kilometres (0.87 mi) towards the southeast, in particular by crossing Lake Gérard (elevation 191 metres (627 ft)) while posting a difference in height from 62 metres (203 ft) to a river bend;
- 3.1 kilometres (1.9 mi) to the northeast, passing through the hamlet of Allen's Mill, collecting the discharge (coming from the north) from a small unidentified lake, going east, then again branching northeast to a bend in the river;
- 0.9 kilometres (0.56 mi) to the east, branching southeast, to Trudel stream (coming from the north);
- 0.7 kilometres (0.43 mi) south to the route 367 bridge;
- 1.7 kilometres (1.1 mi) first south, southeast, then south again, to its mouth.

From its mouth, the Rondeau river flows over 7.0 kilometres (4.3 mi) generally towards the south, following the course of the Jacquot River which flows on the northwest bank of the Sainte-Anne River at 2.8 kilometres (1.7 mi) downstream from the Cascades bridge. From there, the current descends on 55.0 kilometres (34.2 mi) generally south and southwest following the course of the Sainte-Anne River, until on the northwest shore of the St. Lawrence River.

== Toponymy ==
The toponym "Rondeau River" was formalized on May 2, 1985, at the Place Names Bank of the Commission de toponymie du Québec.

== See also ==
- List of rivers of Quebec

== Bibliography ==
- CAPSA (2014). Water master plans of the intervention sectors of the CAPSA management area: Sainte-Anne, Portneuf and La Chevrotière (PDF) (in French). Quebec: CAPSA. p. 691.
