= Americaine River =

Américaine River
- Location within Quebec

Location
- Country: Canada
- Province: Quebec
- Region: Capitale-Nationale
- Regional County Municipality: Portneuf Regional County Municipality
- Municipalities: Sainte-Christine-d'Auvergne

Physical characteristics
- Source: Perthius Lake
  - location: Sainte-Christine-d'Auvergne, MRC Portneuf Regional County Municipality
  - coordinates: 46°50′22″N 72°03′24″W
  - elevation: 224 m (735 ft)
- Mouth: Jacquot River
  - location: Sainte-Christine-d'Auvergne
  - coordinates: 46°50′26″N 71°58′51″W
  - elevation: 140 m (460 ft)
- Length: 11.3 km (7.0 mi)
- Basin size: 777.39 hectares (1,921.0 acres)
- Discharge
  - location: Sainte-Christine-d'Auvergne

Basin features
- Tributaries
  - left: (Upward from the mouth) Le Gros Ruisseau (décharge du lac à Théodore), décharge du Lac Praxède, décharge du Lac Écarté.

The American River is a tributary of the Jacquot River flowing in the municipality of Sainte-Christine-d'Auvergne, in the MRC Portneuf Regional County Municipality, in the administrative region of Capitale-Nationale, in Quebec, in Canada.

Forestry is the main economic activity in the sector; recreotourism activities, second.

The surface of the American river (except the rapids zones) is generally frozen from the beginning of December to the end of March; however, safe circulation on the ice is generally done from the end of December to the beginning of March.

== Geography ==
The American River originates from Lake Perthuis (length: 1.9 kilometres (1.2 mi); altitude 224 metres (735 ft)).

The mouth of this lake is located at:

- 2.4 kilometres (1.5 mi) northeast of Clair Lake;
- 6.7 kilometres (4.2 mi) west of the village center of Sainte-Christine-d'Auvergne;
- 5.0 kilometres (3.1 mi) north-west of the confluence of the Jacquot River and Sainte-Anne River.

From the mouth of Lake Perthuis, the course of the Jacquot River flows over 11.3 kilometres (7.0 mi) with a drop of 84 metres (276 ft), according to the following segments:

- 6.5 kilometres (4.0 mi) towards the north-east notably by crossing a small unidentified and marshy lake (altitude 283 metres (928 ft)), collecting the outlet of Lac Écarté (coming from the north-west) then meandering by collecting the discharge from Lake Praxède (coming from the north-west), to Le Gros Ruisseau (coming from the North) which drains Lac à Théode;
- 4.8 kilometres (3.0 mi) in a serpentine southeast to its mouth.

After several streamers at the bottom of a valley between two mountains, including the mountain at Jeannot, the American river flows in a bend on the southwest bank of the Jacquot River at:

- 1.7 kilometres (1.1 mi) west of a curve of the Sainte-Anne River;
- 3.2 kilometres (2.0 mi) north-west of the village center of Sainte-Christine-d'Auvergne;
- 3.7 kilometres (2.3 mi) north of the confluence of the Jacquot River and the Sainte-Anne River.

From there, the current descends on 55.0 kilometres (34.2 mi) generally south and southwest following the course of the Sainte-Anne River, until on the northwest shore of the St. Lawrence River.

== Toponymy ==
The toponym "American River" was formalized on December 5, 1968, at the Place Names Bank of the Commission de toponymie du Québec.

== See also ==
- Sainte-Christine-d'Auvergne
- Portneuf Regional County Municipality
- Jacquot River
- Sainte-Anne River
- List of rivers of Quebec

== Bibliography ==
- CAPSA (2014). Water master plans of the intervention sectors of the CAPSA management area: Sainte-Anne, Portneuf and La Chevrotière (PDF) (in French). Quebec: CAPSA. p. 691. Archived from the original (PDF) on 2019-02-14.
