= Sainte-Christine-d'Auvergne =

- Municipality
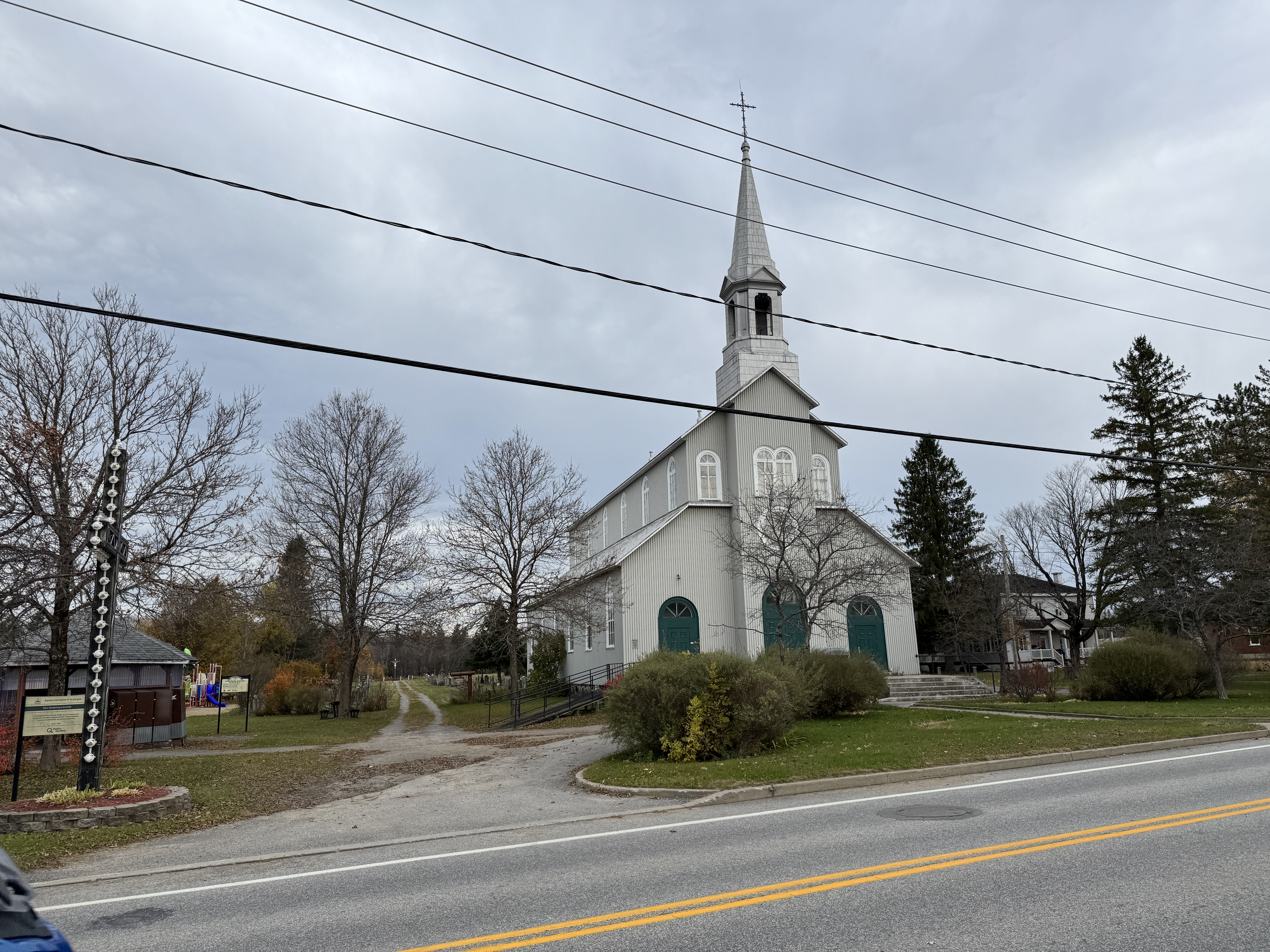
- Cemetery, parish church, Principale St. (Route 354)
- Motto: Crois dans la joie
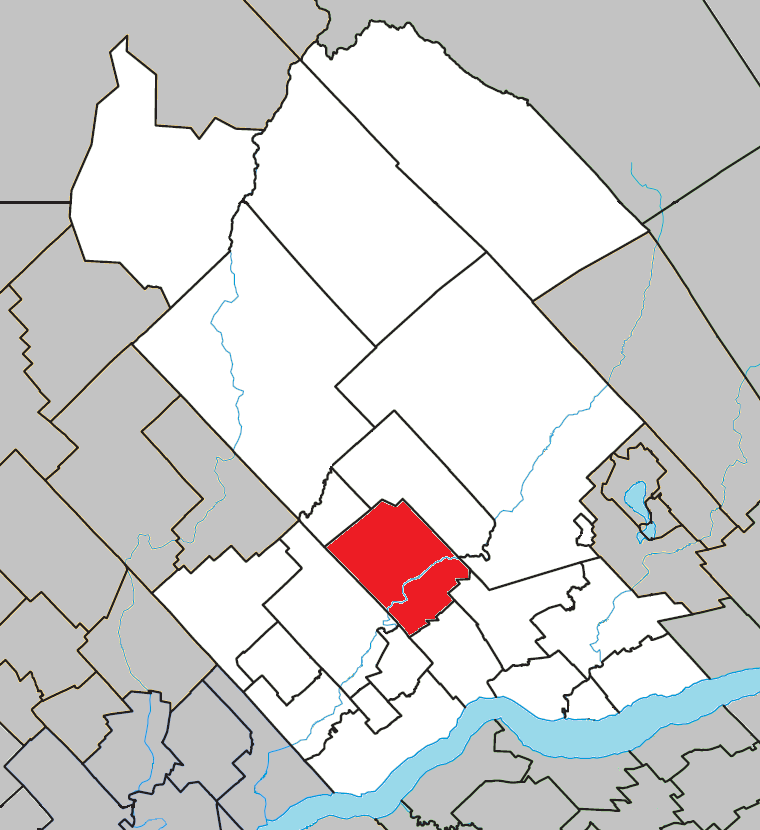
- Location within Portneuf RCM

- Location in central Quebec
- Coordinates: 46°49′N 71°58′W
- Country: Canada
- Province: Quebec
- Region: Capitale-Nationale
- RCM: Portneuf
- Settled: c. 1893
- Constituted: April 10, 1896

Government
  - Mayor: Raymond Francœur
  - Fed. riding: Saint-Augustin—Portneuf—Jacques-Cartier
  - Prov. riding: Portneuf

Area
  - Total: 149.91 km^{2} (57.88 sq mi)
  - Land: 143.60 km^{2} (55.44 sq mi)
- Elevation: 137 m (449 ft)

Population (2021)
  - Total: 617
  - Density: 4.3/km^{2} (11/sq mi)
  - Pop (2016-21): ▲12.0%
  - Dwellings: 485
- Time zone: UTC−5 (EST)
  - Summer (DST): UTC−4 (EDT)
- Postal code(s): G0A 1A0
- Area codes: 418, 581
- Highways: R-354
- Website: sca.quebec

Sainte-Christine-d'Auvergne (French pronunciation: [sɛ̃t kʁistin dovɛʁɲ]), formerly Sainte-Catherine (Parish Municipality), is located along the banks of the Sainte-Anne River, in the Capitale-Nationale region, Portneuf Regional County Municipality, Quebec, Canada.

The municipality has a population of 617 (2021), on a land area of 144 square kilometres (56 sq mi), divided between logging and agricultural land development. Demonym: Auvergnat, ate (French).

== History ==
In 1893, the local mission was founded, named after Sister Sainte-Christine, born Clara Deschènes, who held a senior position at the Daughters of Charity in Quebec at that time. In 1895, it became a parish by separating from Saint-Raymond, Saint-Basile, and Notre-Dame-de-Portneuf. In 1896, it was incorporated as the Parish Municipality of Sainte-Christine, and its post office opened.

The town was also frequently called Sainte-Christine-de-l'Auvergne, Sainte-Christine-d'Auvergne, or Sainte-Christine-de-Portneuf in order to distinguish it from a namesake municipality in the Montérégie region. In 1991, the place officially changed its name to Sainte-Christine-d'Auvergne.

== Demographics ==
=== Population ===
Canada census – Sainte-Christine-d'Auvergne community profile

	2021	2016	2011
Population	617 (+12.0% from 2016)	704 (+57.1% from 2011)	448 (-3.0% from 2006)
Land area	143.60 km^{2} (55.44 sq mi)	144.28 km^{2} (55.71 sq mi)	143.85 km^{2} (55.54 sq mi)
Population density	4.3/km^{2} (11/sq mi)	4.9/km^{2} (13/sq mi)	3.1/km^{2} (8.0/sq mi)
Median age	54.4 (M: 57.2, F: 51.6)	52.4 (M: 53.4, F: 51.1)	50.9 (M: 51.4, F: 50.2)
Private dwellings	485 (total) 323 (occupied)	502 (total)	411 (total)
Median household income	$64,500	$52,608	$41,293

References: 2021 2016 2011

Historical Census Data - Sainte-Christine-d'Auvergne, Quebec

Year	Pop.	±%
1901	664	—
1911	591	−11.0%
1921	560	−5.2%
1931	499	−10.9%
1941	535	+7.2%
1951	488	−8.8%
1956	471	−3.5%

Year	Pop.	±%
1961	403	−14.4%
1966	377	−6.5%
1971	325	−13.8%
1976	326	+0.3%
1981	349	+7.1%
1986	340	−2.6%
1991	314	−7.6%

Year	Pop.	±%
1996	337	+7.3%
2001	330	−2.1%
2006	462	+40.0%
2011	448	−3.0%
2016	551	+23.0%
2021	617	+12.0%

Source: Statistics Canada

=== Language ===
Canada Census Mother Tongue - Sainte-Christine-d'Auvergne, Quebec
Census	Total	French			English			French & English			Other		
Year	Responses	Count	Trend	Pop %	Count	Trend	Pop %	Count	Trend	Pop %	Count	Trend	Pop %
2021	620	600	▼13.0%	96.8%	10	0.0%	1.6%	0	0.0%	0.0%	5	▲ n/a%	0.8%
2016	705	690	▲55.1%	97.9%	10	▲ n/a	1.4%	0	0.0%	0.0%	0	▼100.0%	0.0%
2011	450	445	0.0%	98.9%	0	0.0%	0.0%	0	0.0%	0.0%	5	▼50.0%	1.1%
2006	465	445	▲13.4%	95.7%	0	0.0%	0.0%	0	0.0%	0.0%	10	▲ n/a%	2.2%
2001	330	330	▼1.5%	100.0%	0	0.0%	0.0%	0	0.0%	0.0%	0	0.0%	0.0%
1996	335	335	n/a	100.0%	0	n/a	0.0%	0	n/a	0.0%	0	n/a	0.0%

== Notable people ==
- It is the place where the Canadian-American actor Glenn Ford was born in 1916.

== See also ==
- Clair Lake (Sainte-Christine-d'Auvergne)
