= Sainte-Anne River (Les Chenaux) =

Sainte-Anne River (Les Chenaux) Telahiar River (Wendat)
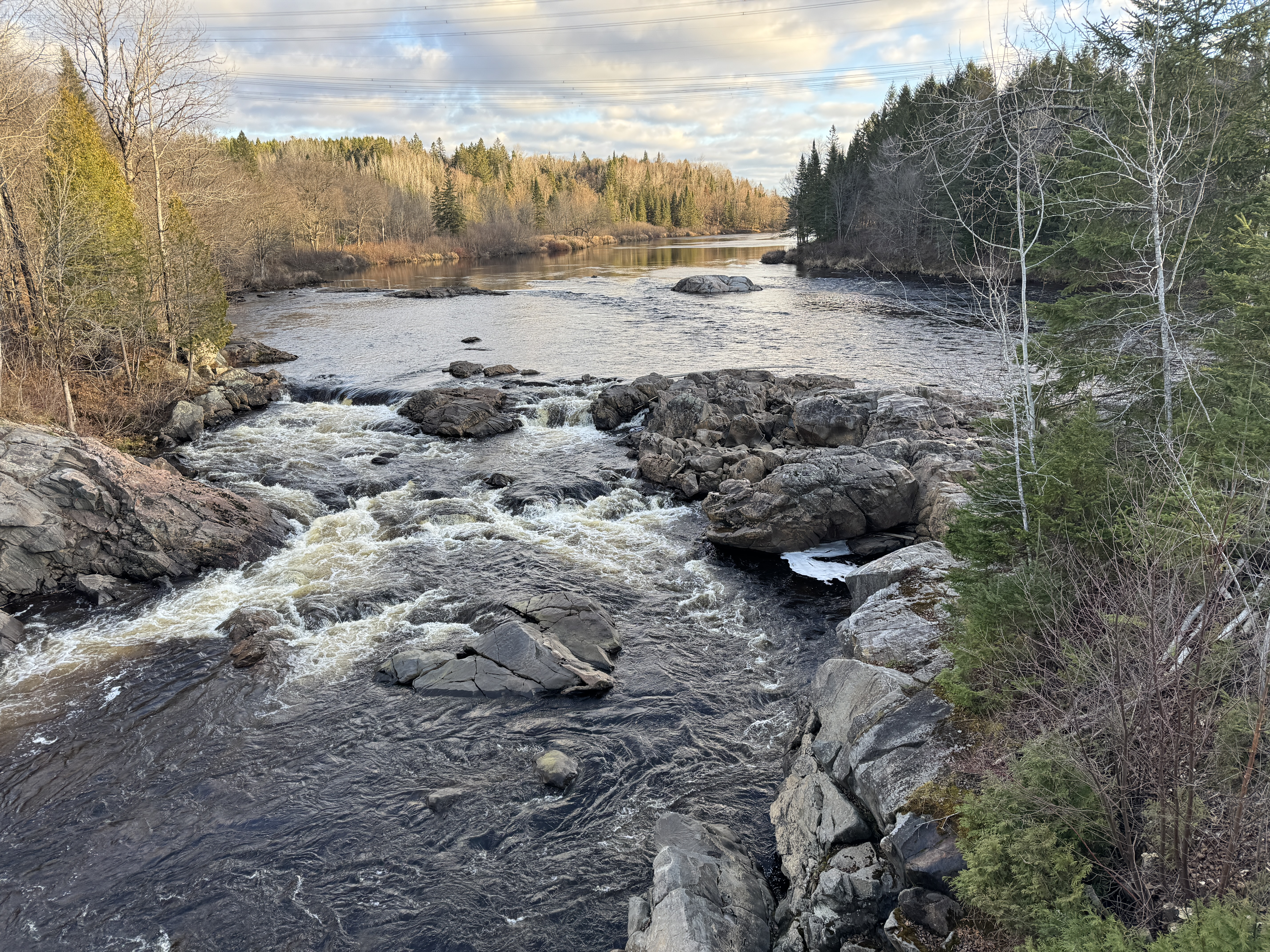
- Upstream, from Ponts des Cascades, Sainte-Christine-d'Auvergne

Location
- Country: Canada
- Province: Quebec

Physical characteristics
- Source: Laurentides wildlife reserve
  - location: Sainte-Anne Lake
- Mouth: Estuary of St. Lawrence River
  - location: Sainte-Anne-de-la-Pérade

Sainte-Anne River (Les Chenaux), Teyaiar River (Wendat), rivière Sainte-Anne (French), flows from north to south on the north shore in the estuary section of the St. Lawrence River, in Les Chenaux, Portneuf and La Jacques-Cartier RCM, Mauricie and National Capital regions, Quebec, Canada.

== Toponymy ==
The Sainte-Anne River has its source in the Laurentides Wildlife reserve, in Lake Sainte-Anne. The river, approximately 120 km long, flows from north to south, crossing the municipalities of Saint-Alban and Saint-Casimir to end its course at Sainte-Anne-de-la-Pérade, on the north shore of the estuarine section. of the St. Lawrence River.

== 1894 Landslide ==
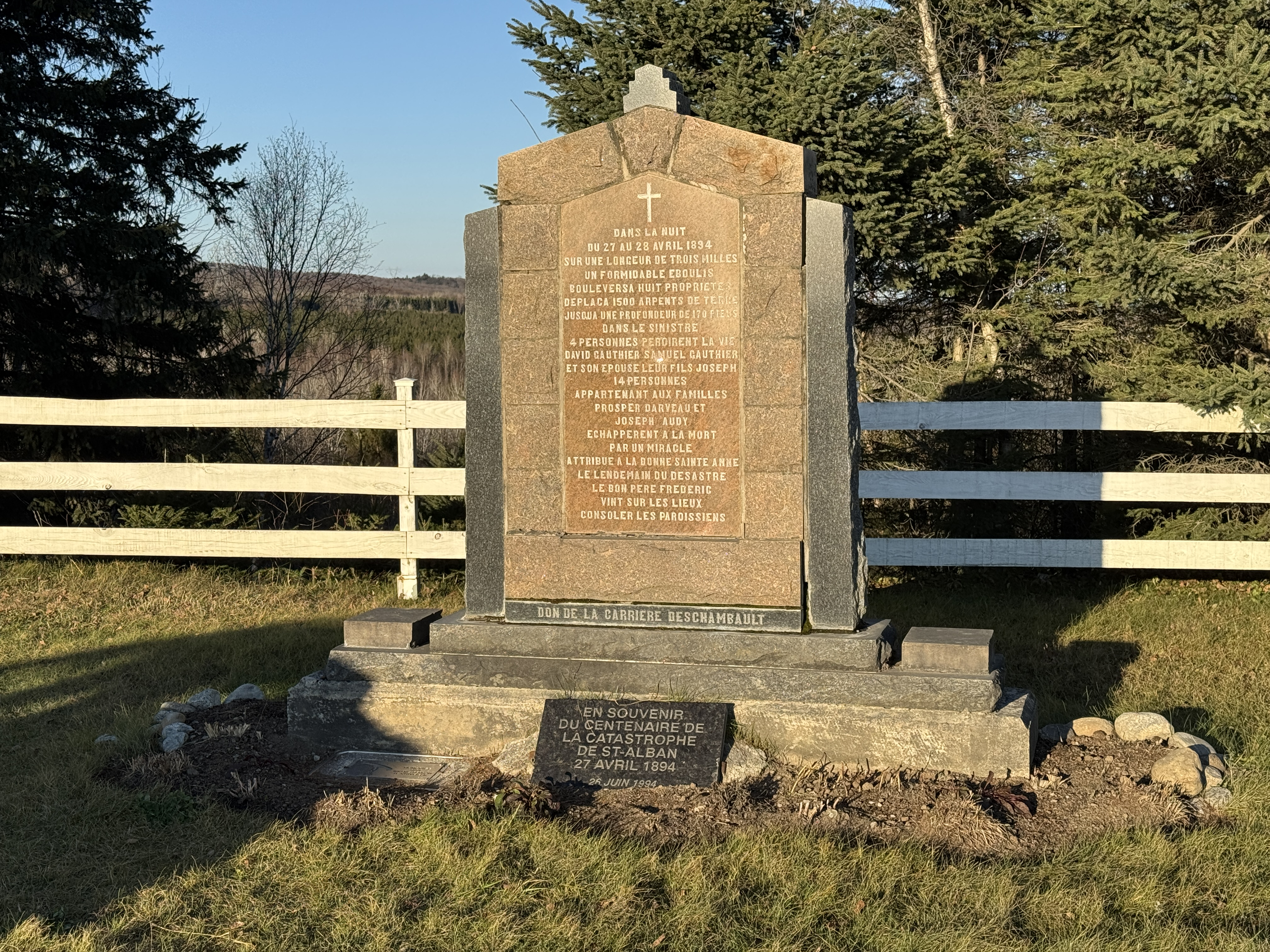
Commemorative plaque of the landslide of April 1894, rank of the Black River, Saint-Alban

In terms of surface area, the 1894 landslide in Saint-Alban would be the largest in the known history of Quebec.

During the night of April 27 to 28, 25 km from the mouth of the Sainte-Anne River, in Saint-Alban, 600 ha of soil slid into the bed of the Noire River. The large quantity of displaced soil modified the geography of several secondary watercourses which fed the Sainte-Anne River. The moving sediments blocked the channel of the Charest River and changed the course of the Gendron stream. 4 km upstream from Sainte-Anne-de-la-Pérade, soil began to be deposited, creating silting, islands, islets and channels, up to the mouth of the river in the St. Lawrence River.

The landslide of 1894 killed 4 people, upset 8 properties, uprooted bridges and docks, slowed down the transport of wood by floating, affected sawmills and put an end to commercial navigation upstream of Sainte-Anne-de-la-Pérade.

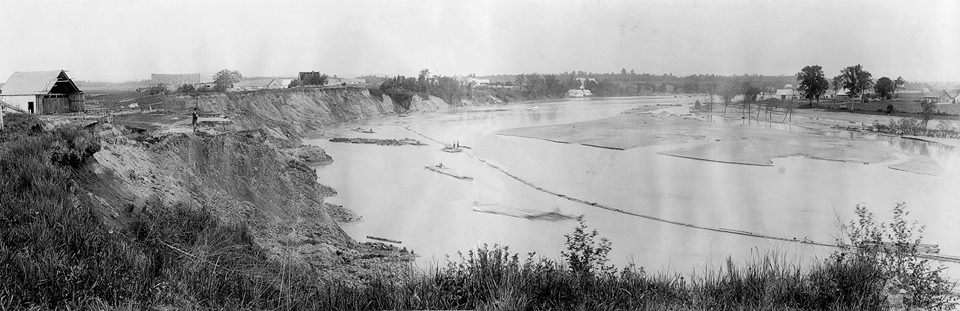
Noire River (Rivière Noire), Saint-Alban landslide 1894

The landslide eroded the banks of the Saint-Anne River, caused numerous secondary landslides and carried earth, sand and gravel. This geological movement modified the watercourses over nearly 25 km. The Sainte-Anne became wider and shallower, this new hydrography creating an exceptional aquatic environment for the reproduction of the Tommy cod. Until April 1894, the Sainte-Anne River was a salmon river.

== Geography ==
In Portneuf RCM, the Sainte-Anne River region has an area of approximately 185 km^{2} (110 square miles). In the North/South axis, the territory goes from Saint-Alban to the St. Lawrence River. From East to West, it stretches between longitudes 72° and 72°15'.

Saint-Marc-des-Carrières, Saint-Alban, Saint-Casimir, Grondines and Saint-Thuribe are the main municipalities of Portneuf RCM bathed by the Sainte-Anne River. The mouth of the river, at Sainte-Anne-de-la-Pérade, is part of Les Chenaux RCM.

== Water Quality ==
The population of the Sainte-Anne River watershed is very concerned about its aquatic ecosystem. On the main course, due to the high water flow, the water quality is good or satisfactory.

In the northern part, sparsely populated and largely dominated by forest, the water of the river and its tributaries is of very good quality.

In St. Lawrence Lowlands, the southern part of the watershed is used for agricultural purposes and is more densely populated, the waters are of poor quality. Agricultural activities are responsible for a large part of the phosphorus loads measured in the sub-basins of the Blanche, Charest, Niagarette rivers and the Gendron Creek.

== Drainage Basin ==
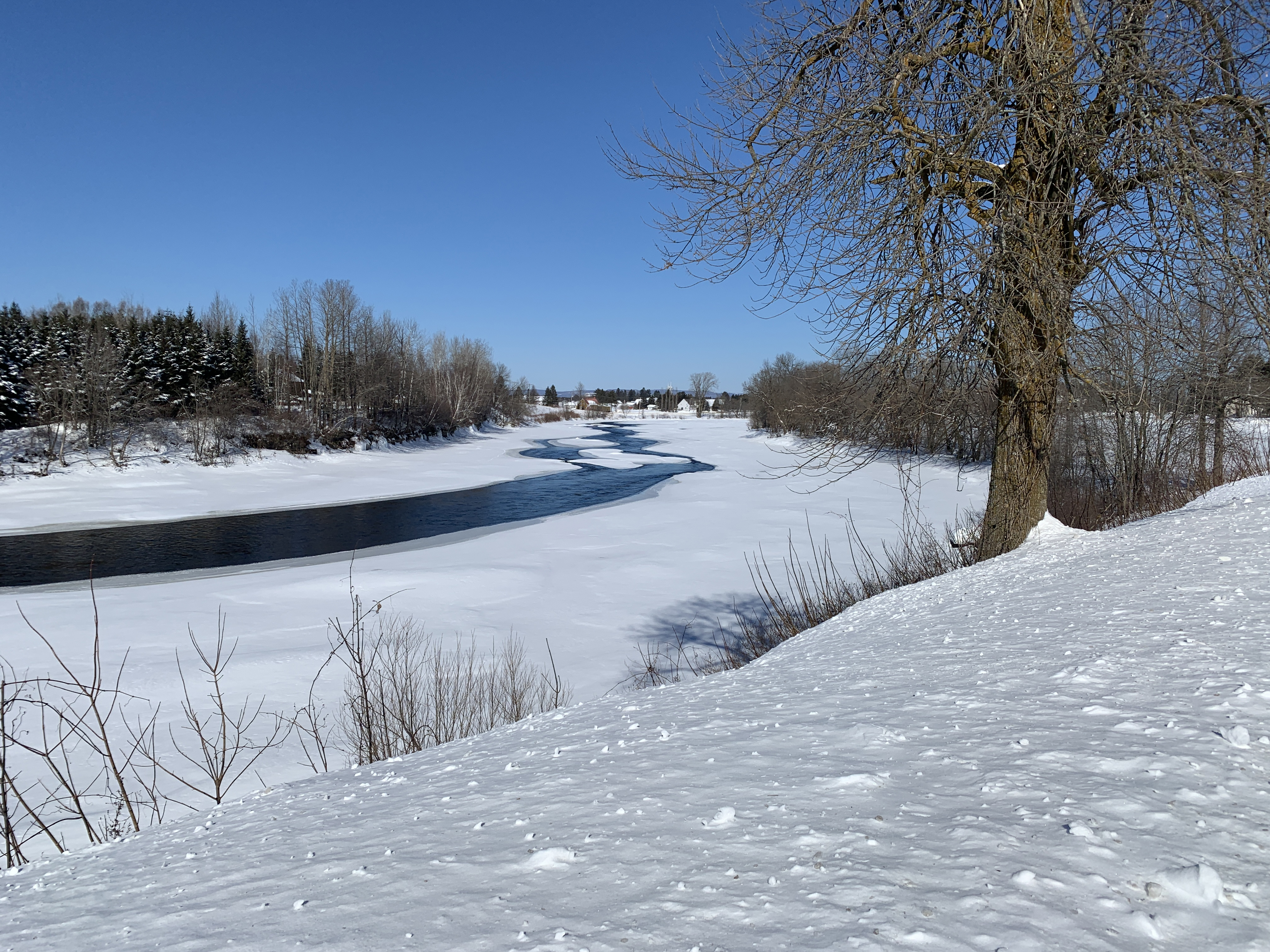
St. Lawrence Lowlands, Sainte-Anne river, rang du Rapide-Sud, Saint-Casimir

The 2,717.47 km² of the territory of the Sainte-Anne River drainage basin, and its sub-drainage-basin, include the Tourilli, Chézine, Talayarde, Bras-du-Nord and Jacquot rivers to the north and the Noire, Niagarette and Charest to the south. We must add the Lacoursière and Grimard streams and 204 km² of marshes and natural peat bogs.

The forest environment and its lakes cover 79% of the territory of the Sainte-Anne River region, mainly in the southern Laurentians Mountains. Agricultural and urban environments occupy 21% of the land located in the St. Lawrence Lowlands. It is estimated that there were 17 769 people who lived in the Sainte-Anne basin in 2004-2006. The town of Saint-Raymond alone has half the population of the basin. Four other villages are located on the course of the river, namely Sainte-Christine-d'Auvergne, Saint-Alban, Saint-Casimir and Sainte-Anne-de-la-Pérade.

The Sainte-Anne River watershed has a little more than 840 lakes, 758 of which have a surface area greater than one hectare. Mainly located on public land, the sector includes several spaces dedicated to the conservation and development of the territory, including the Parc naturel régional de Portneuf, 10 white-tailed deer containment areas and two Controlled Exploitation Zones (ZEC).

Sainte-Anne River (Les Chenaux), overview

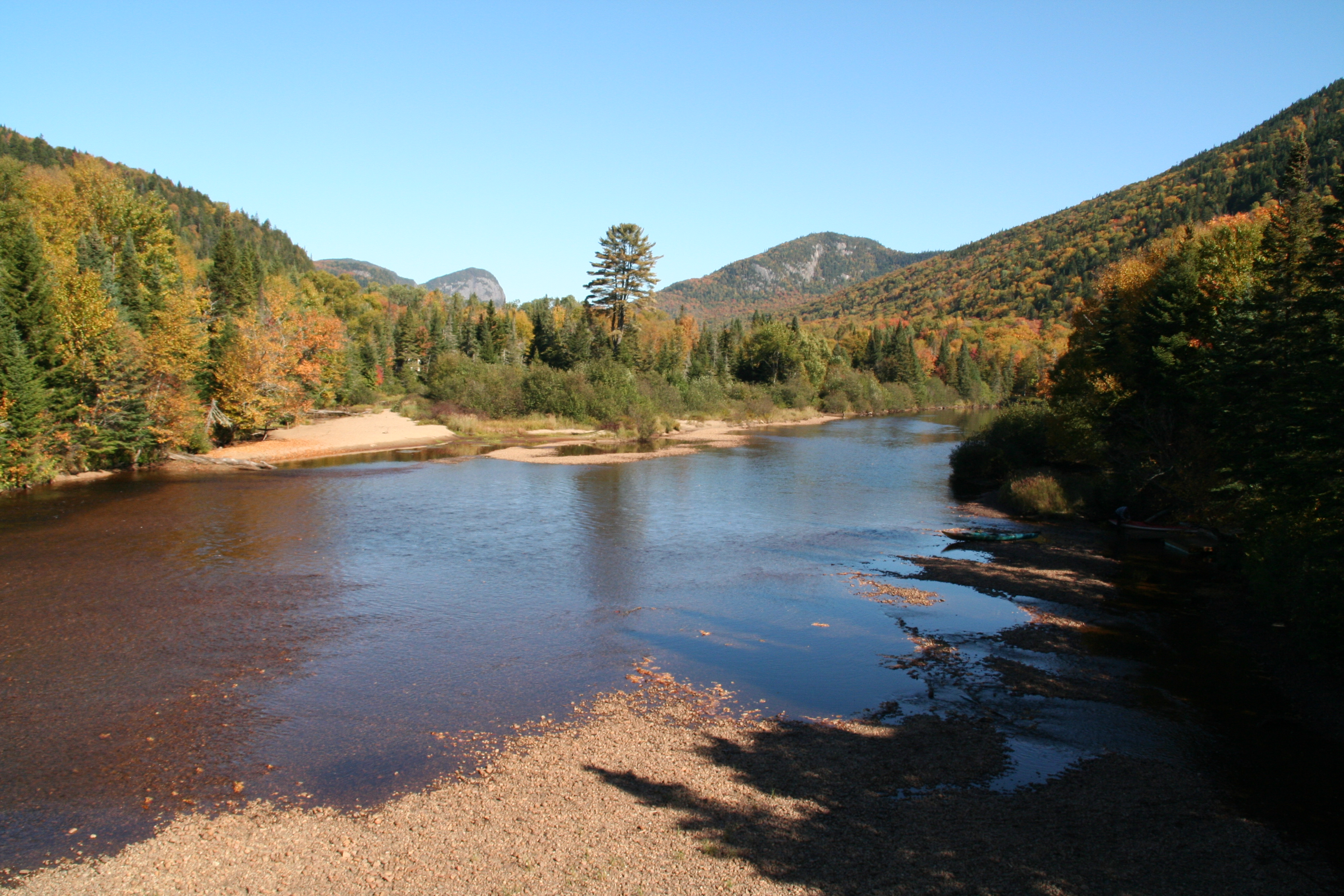
Rivière Bras-du-Nord (Sainte-Anne), Saint-Raymond

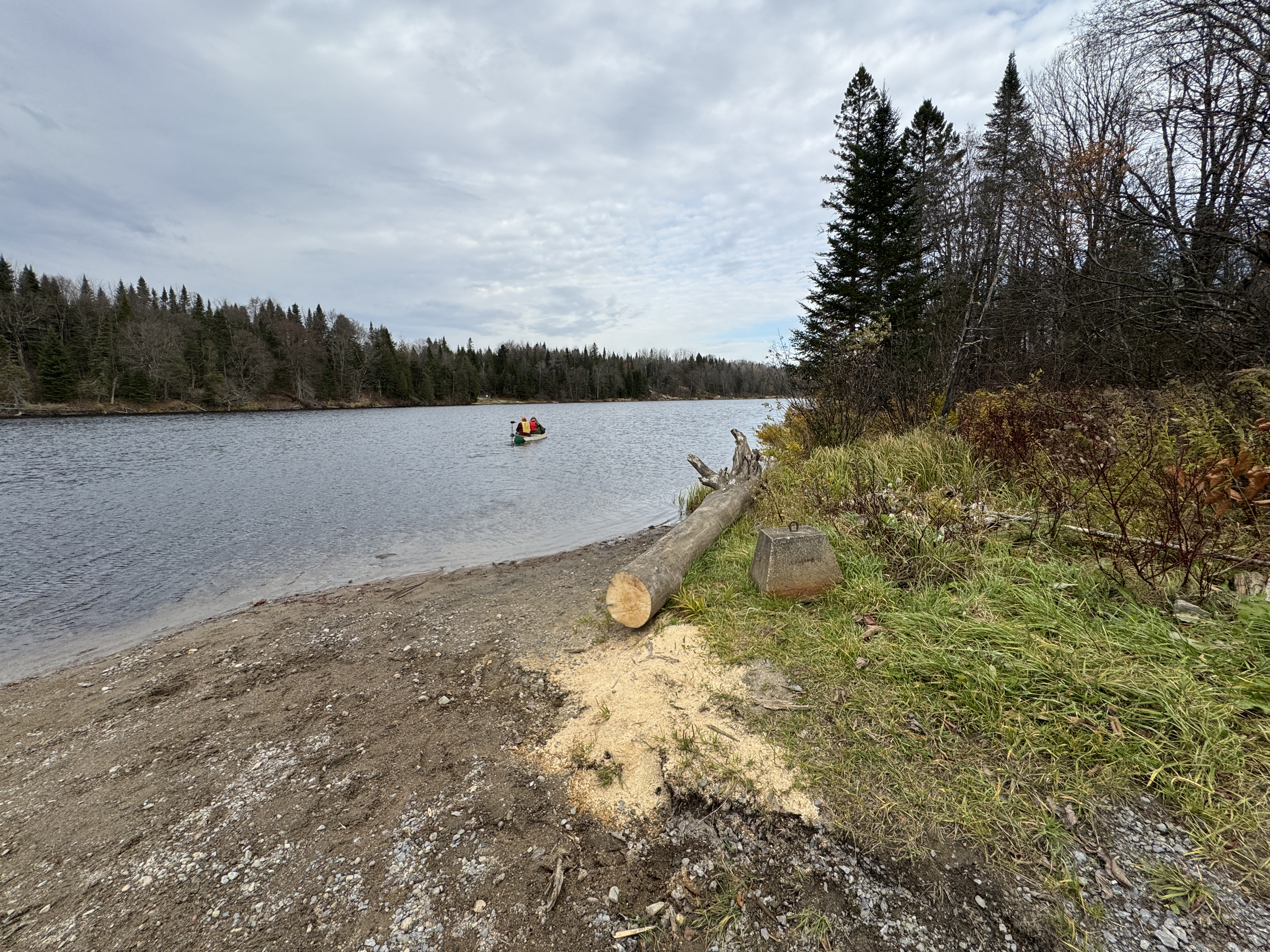
Canoe on the river and landing area, Sainte-Christine-d'Auvergne

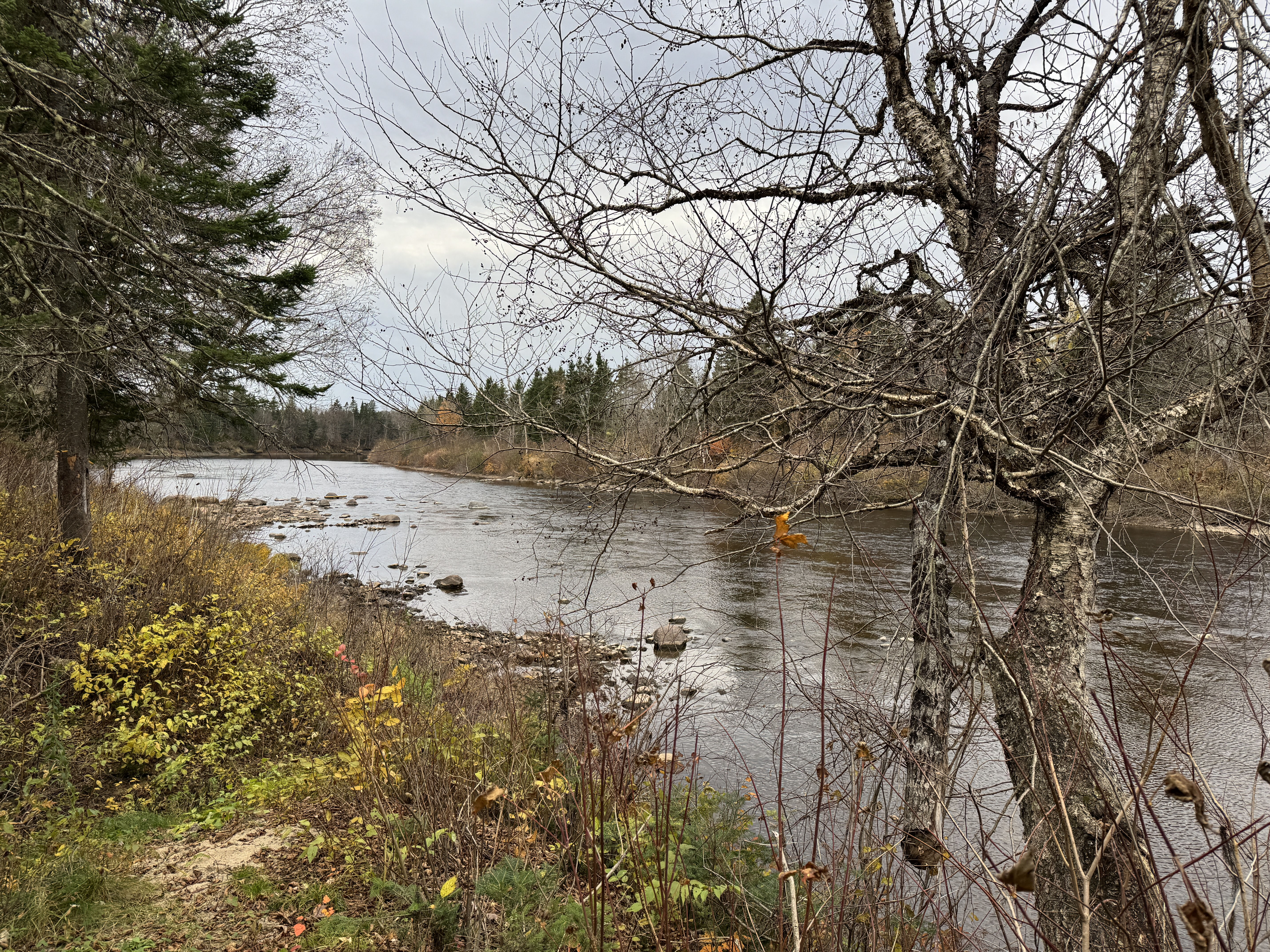
Downstream of the Chutes-Ford Dam, Sainte-Christine-d'Auvergne

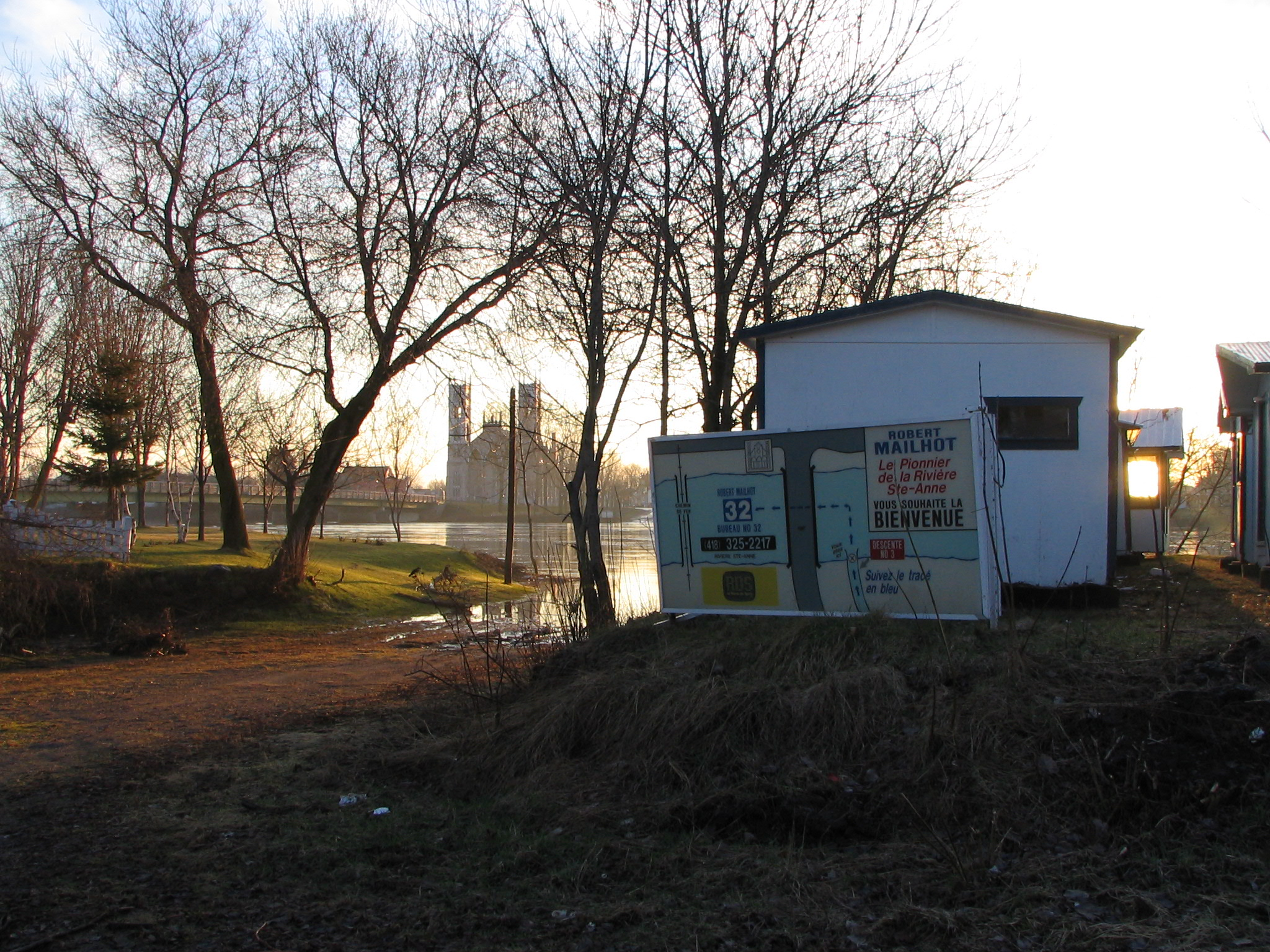
Fishing hut, bridge on the Chemin du Roy, parish church, Sainte-Anne-de-la-Pérade
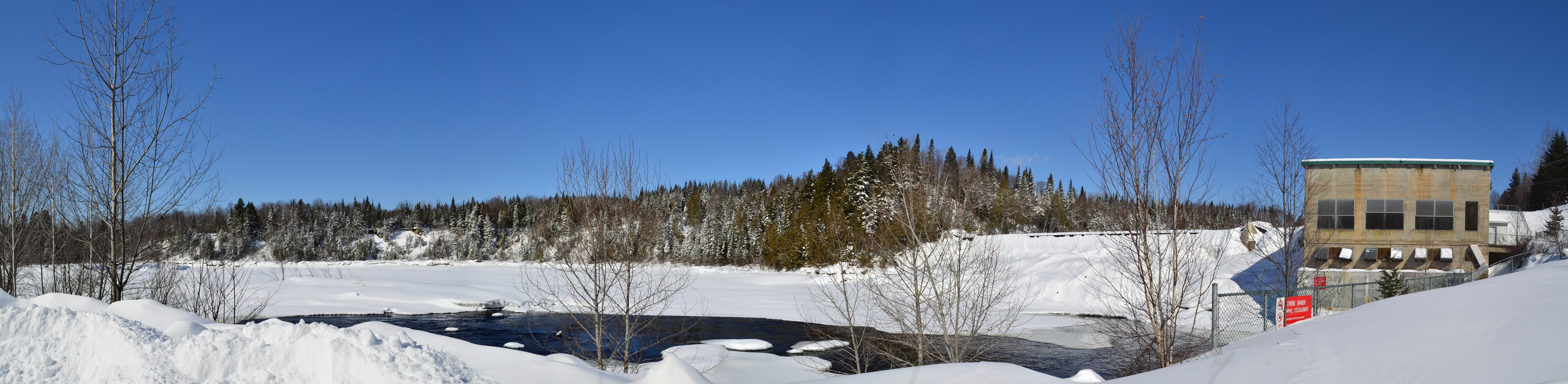
Ford Falls Dam, Sainte-Christine-d'Auvergne
Sainte-Anne River in Saint-Casimir

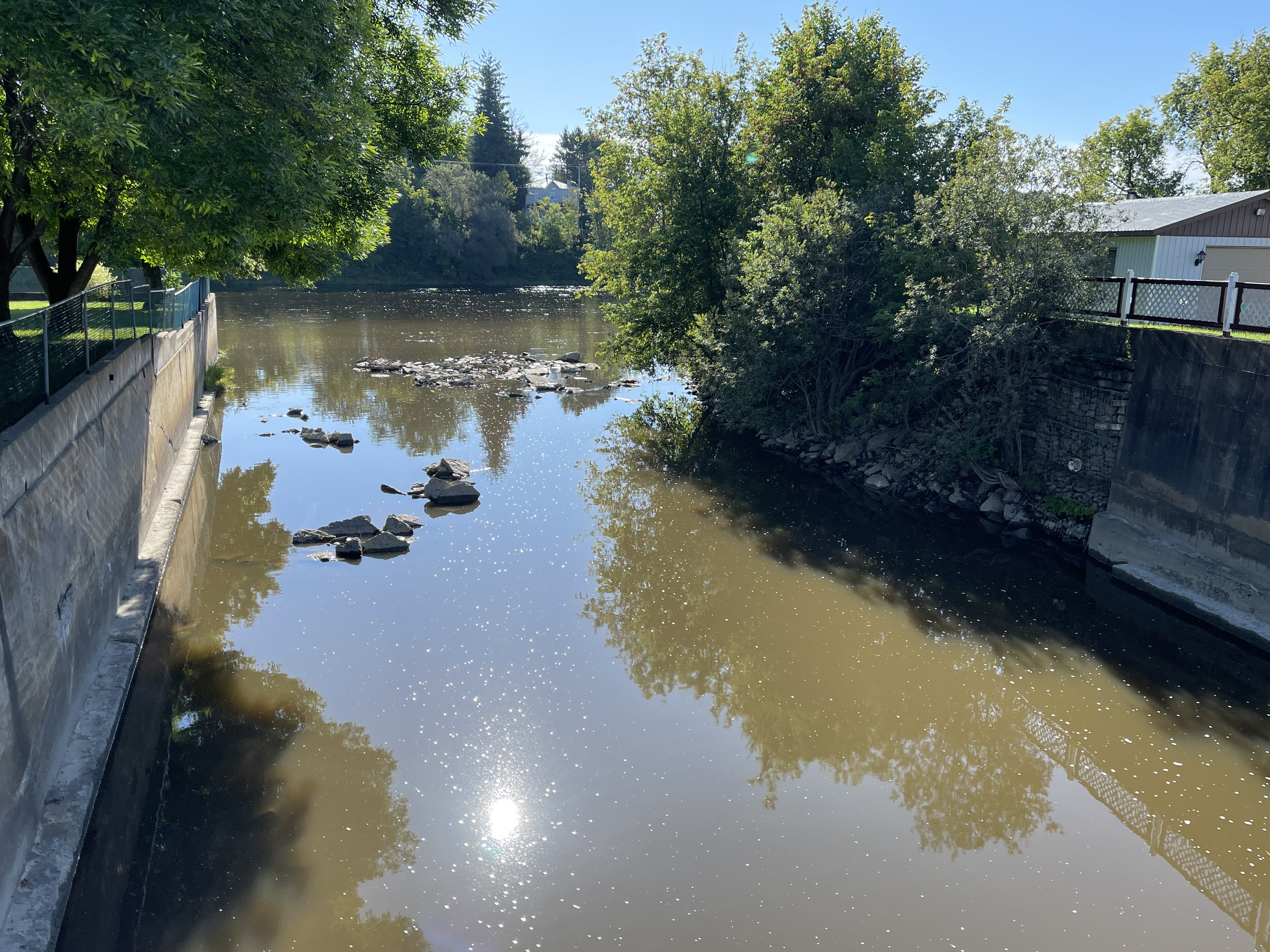
Confluence of the Niagarette and Sainte-Anne rivers, rue Tessier, (Quebec Route 354)

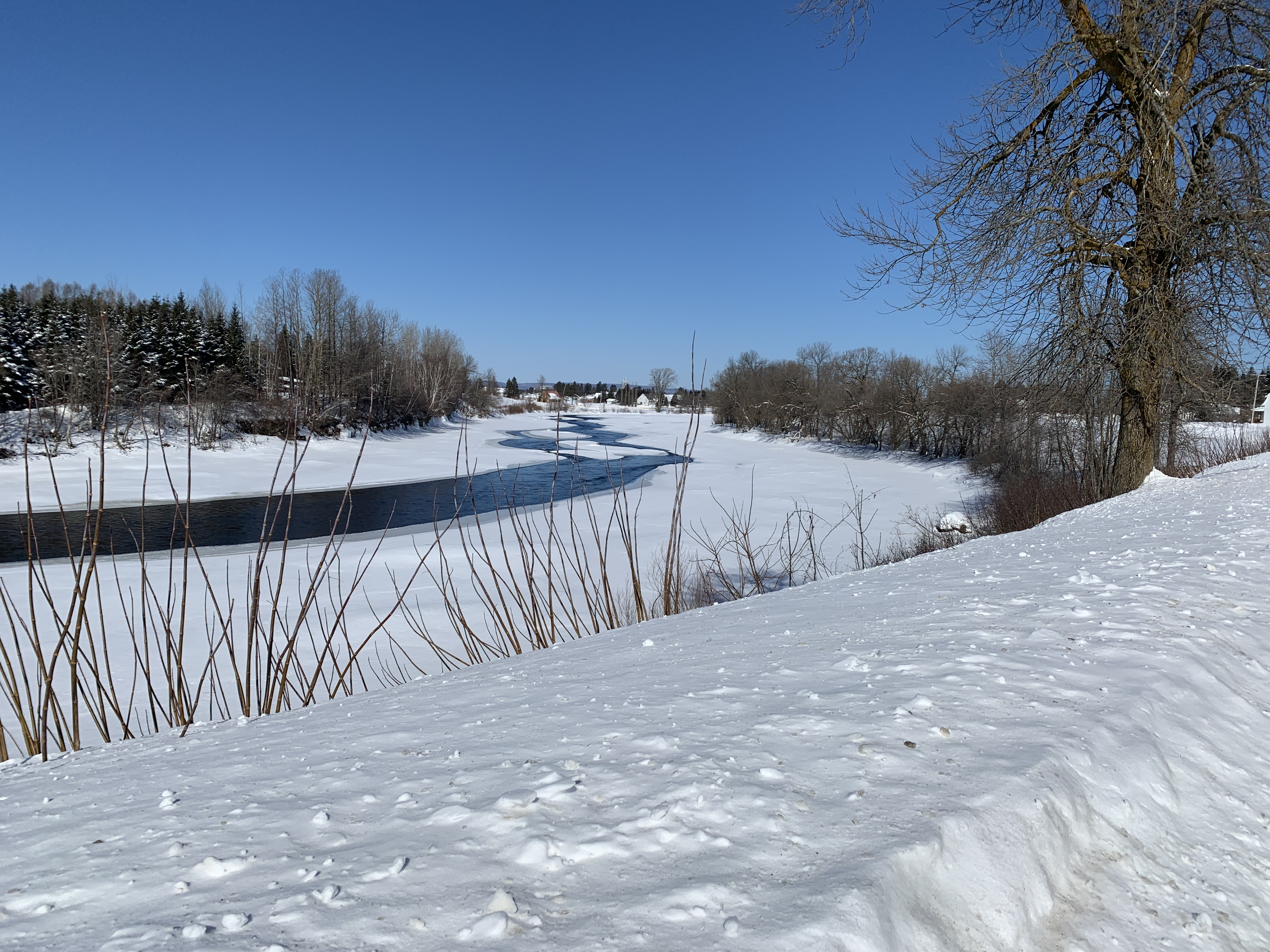
Rang du Rapide Sud

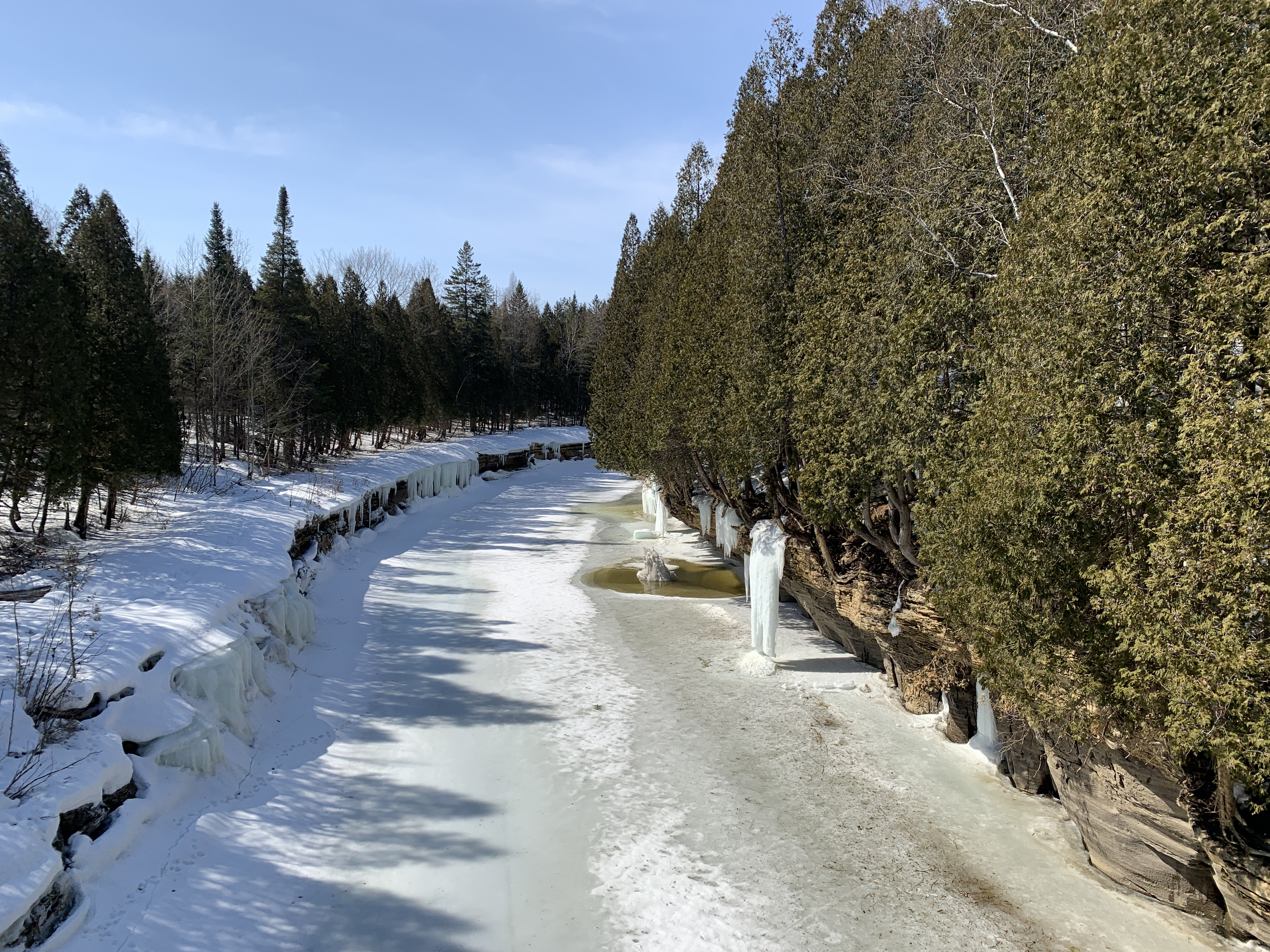
Sedimentary rocks, Trenton Group limestones, rock faces, ice formations

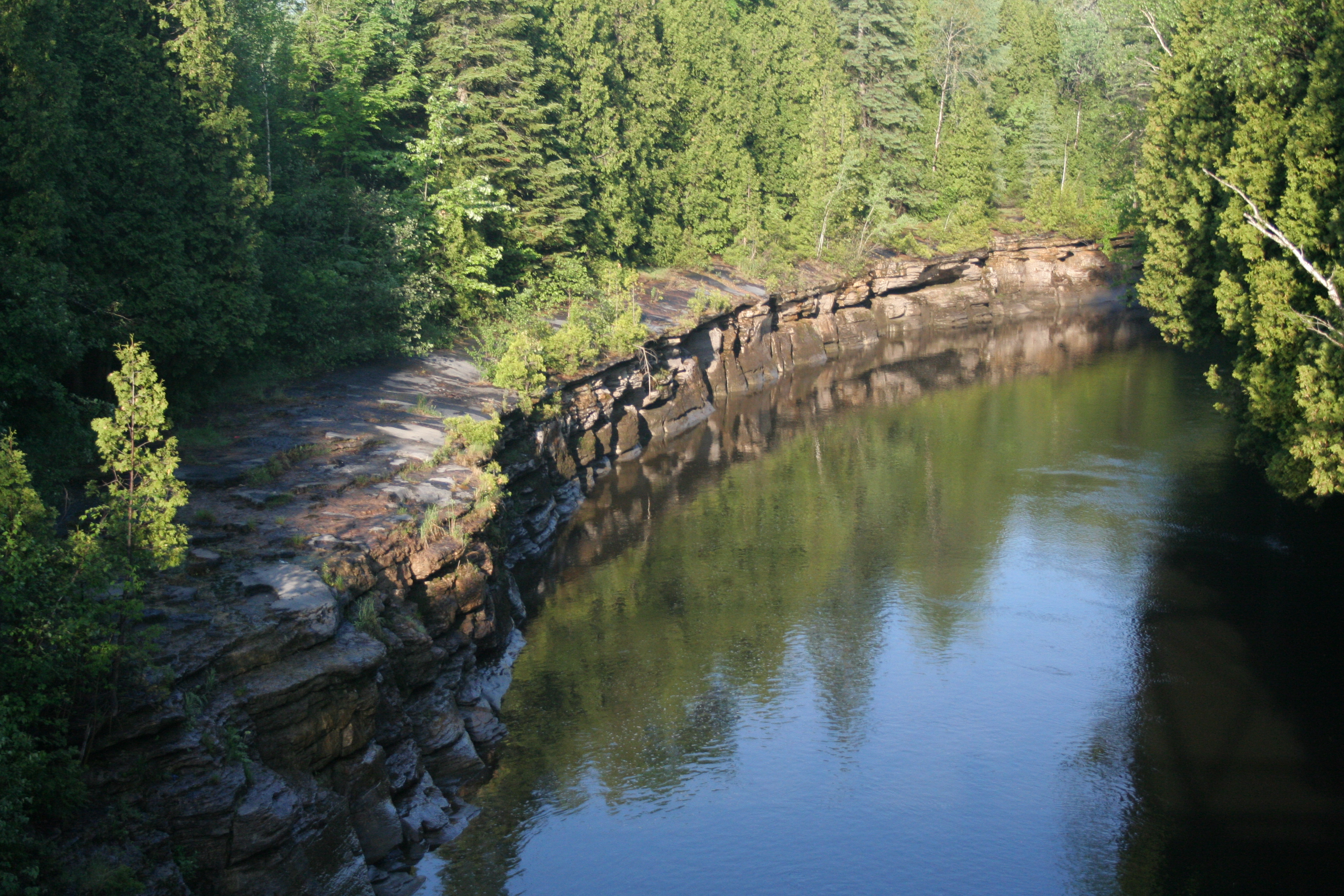
Rock faces of sedimentary Trenton Group limestones, from bridge on Route des Lefebvre

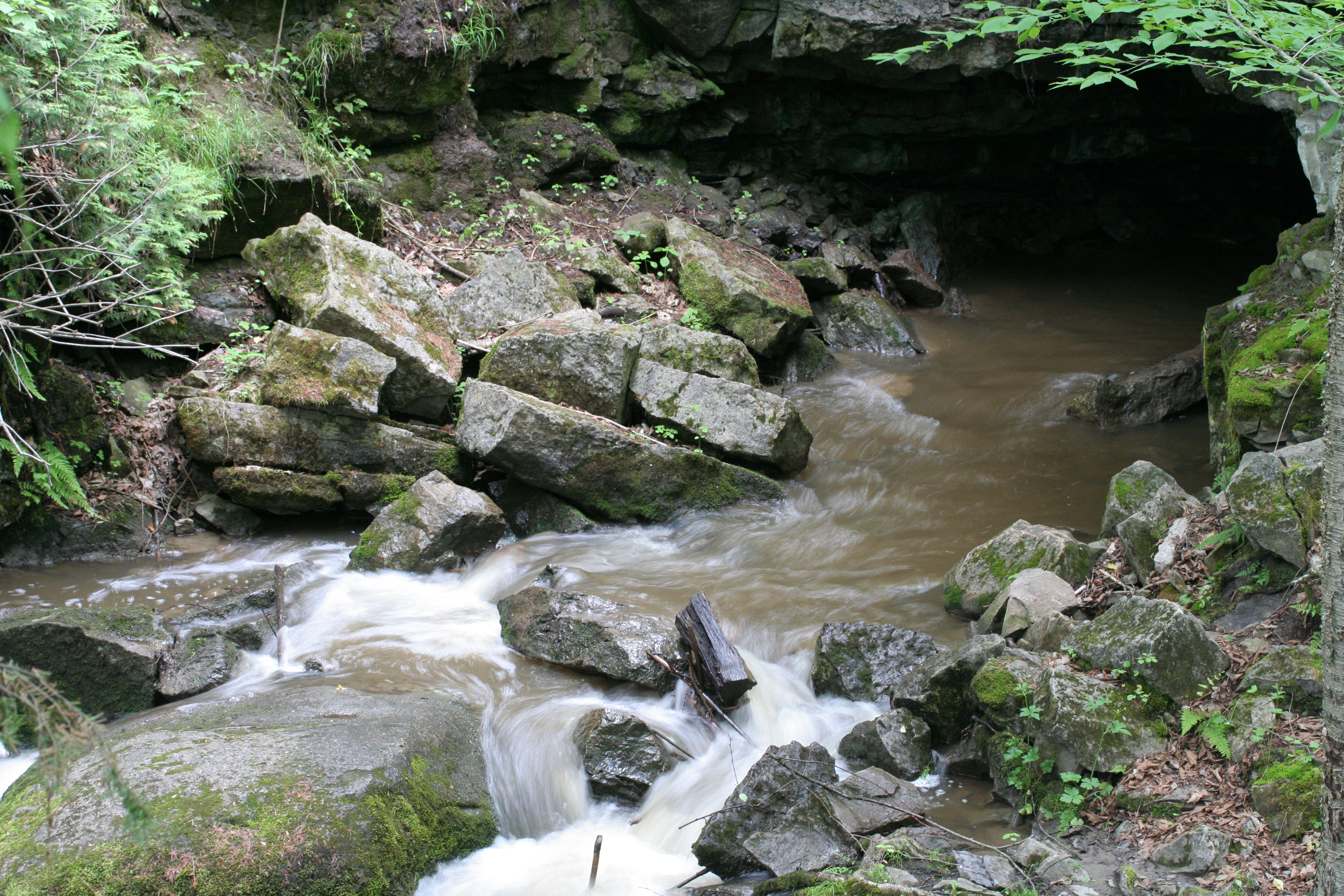
Tributary of the Sainte-Anne River at its exit from the cave of Trou du diable, a few meters from its mouth

== Fauna ==
Fishing is an activity accessible to everyone in Quebec, it allows the discovery of fish species. It is important to know the rules that govern activity in lakes or rivers, in the wilderness as well as in an urban environment.

Ministry of the Environment and the Fight Against Climate publishes a new regulation every two years.

=== Fish Species Present in Sainte-Anne River ===
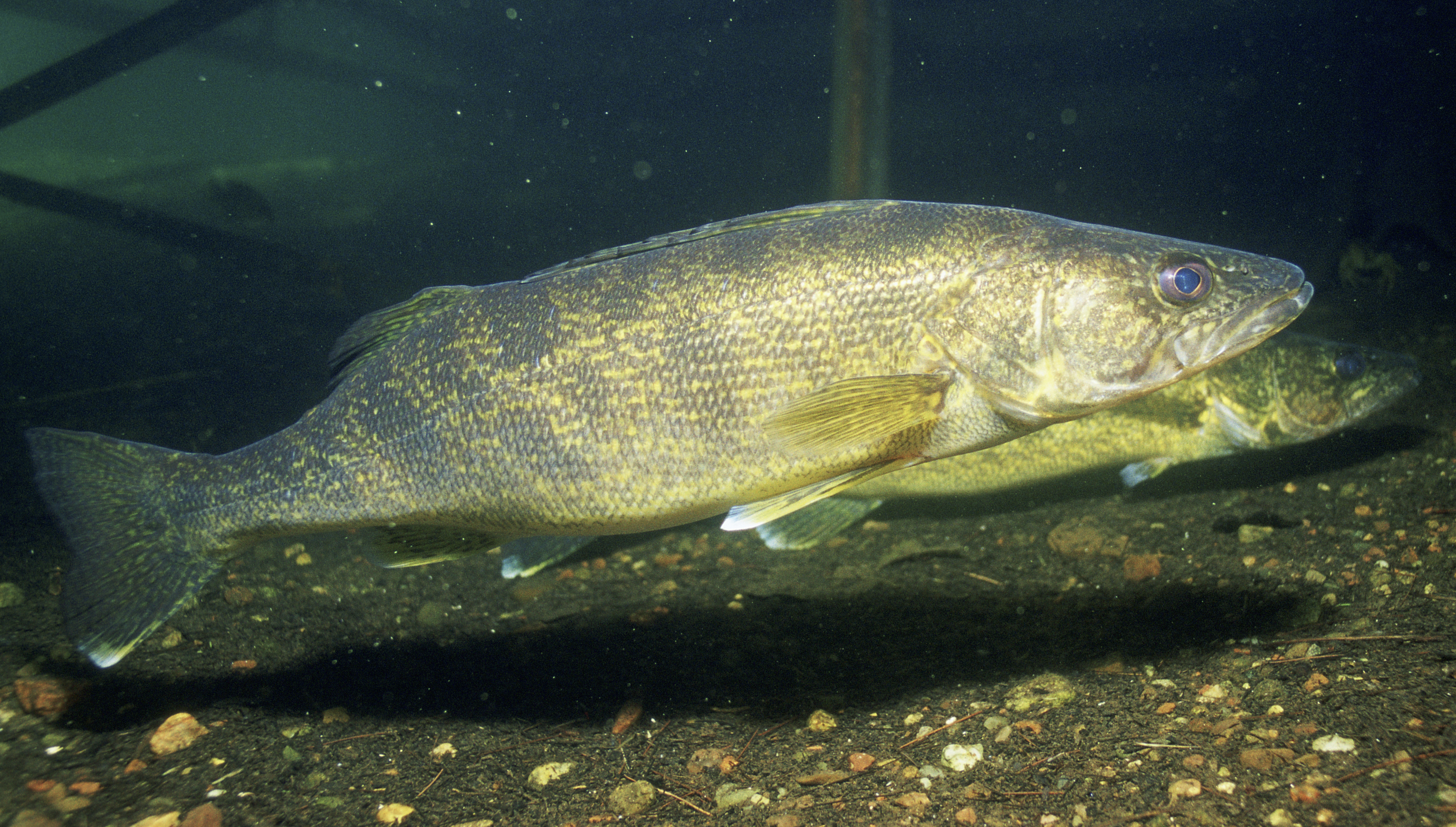
Stizostedion vitreum Mittchill. — Doré jaune. — (Walleye). From water to the plate, recipes

Among the 27 species of fish mentioned in the list below, Cottus ricei Nelson, Cottus bairdii Girard and Margariscus margarita Cope were sampled by the Ministry of Natural Resources and Wildlife between 2003 and 2006, the others by the Sainte-Anne Development and Protection Corporation (CAPSA), in 2002.

- Alosa sapidissima. —Alose savoureuse. — (American Shad).
- Ambloplites rupestris Rafinesque. — Crapet de roche. — (Rock Bass).
- Ameiurus nebulosus Lesueur. — Barbotte brune. — (Brown catfish, Brown bullhead, Bullhead, Catfish, Common bullhead, Common catfish).
- Catostomus catostomus Forster. — Meunier rouge — (Longnose Sucker).
- Catostomus commersoni Lacepède. — Meunier noir — (White sucker).
- Cottus bairdii Girard. —Chabot tacheté. — (Mottled Sculpin.
- Cottus ricei Nelson. — Chabot à tête plate. — (Spoonhead sculpin).
- Culaea inconstans Kirtland. — Épinoche à cinq épines. — (Brook stickleback)
- Etheostoma flabellare Rafinesque — Dard barré. — (Fantail darter).
- Etheostoma nigrum Rafinesque— Raseux-de-terre noir — (Johnny Darter).
- Fundulus diaphanus Lesueur. — Fondule barré. — (Banded killifish).
- Gasterosteus aculeatus Linnaeus. — Épinoche à trois épines. — (Three-spined stickleback).
- Lampetra lamottei Lesueur. — Lamproie de l'Est — (American Brook Lamprey).
- Lepomis gibbosus Linnaeus. — Crapet soleil, Crapet jaune, Perche-soleil, Montre d’or. — (Pumpkinseed, Pumpkinseed sunfish, Yellow sunfish, Common sunfish, Sun bass).
- Luxilus cornutus Rafinesque — Méné à nageoires rouges — (Common shiner).
- Margariscus margarita Cope. — Mulet perlé. — (Allegheny Pearl Dace).
- Micropterus dolomieu Lacepede. — Achigan à petite bouche. — (Smallmouth bass, Bronzeback, Brown bass, Brownie, Smallie, Bronze bass, and Bareback bass).
- Percina caprodes Rafinesque. — Fouille-roche zébré, Dard-perche. —(Logperch).
- Percopsis omiscomaycus Walbaum. — Omisco — (Trout-perch, Grounder, Sand minnow).
- Petromyzon marinus Linnaeus — Lamproie marine — (Sea lamprey).
- Pimephales notatus Rafinesque. — Méné à museau arrondi — (Bluntnose minnow).
- Rhinichthys atratulus Herman. — Naseux noir de l'Est — (Eastern blacknose dace).
- Rhinichthys cataractae Valenciennes. — Naseux des rapides — (Longnose dace).
- Salvelinus fontinalis Mitchill. — Omble de fontaine — (Brook trout).
- Semotilus atromaculatus Mitchill. — Mulet à cornes. — (Creek chub).
- Semotilus corporalis Mitchill. — Ouitouche, Poisson blanc, Mulet. — (Fallfish, American Chub, Chivin, Corporal, Dace, Mohawk, Pennsylvania Giant Chub, Rough-nosed Chub, Shining Dace, Silver Chub, Windfish).
- Stizostedion vitreum Mittchill. — Doré jaune. — (Walleye).

Winter visitor, the Atlantic tomcod spawns between mid-December and the end of January mainly up to the Sainte-Anne and Batiscan rivers, in the Estuary of St. Lawrence River.

- Microgadus tomcod Walbaum. — Poulamon atlantique, Petit poisson des chenaux, poulamon, petite morue, loche. — (Atlantic tomcod, Tomcod, Frostfish, Tommycod).

== Tommy Cod Fishing ==
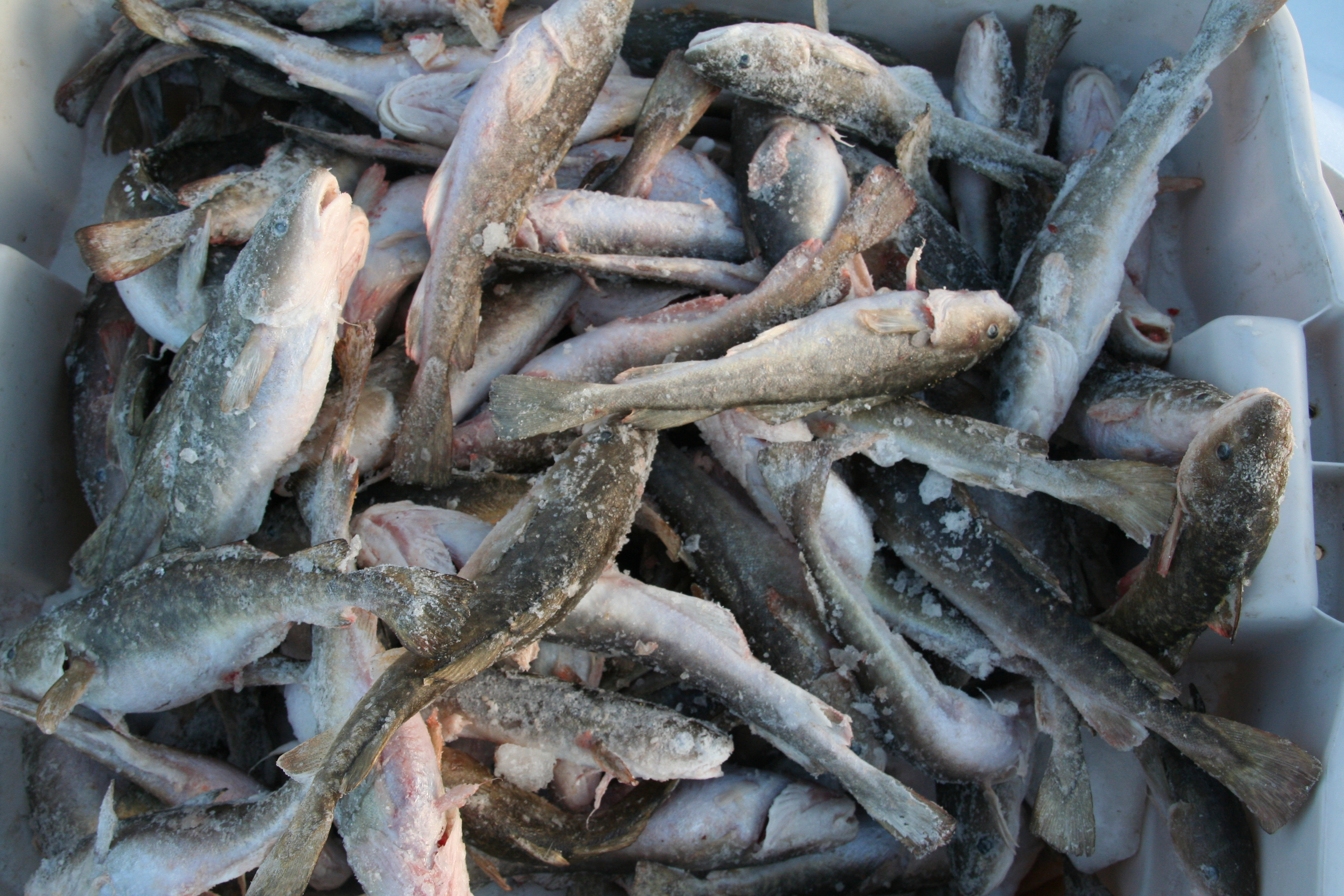
Microgadus tomcod frozen on the ice of the river, at the door of a fishing hut

Tommy cod fishing is a traditional activity in the Mauricie region practiced for several centuries, the Iroquois were already fishing for Tommy cod fish in the year 1000 AD. In Sainte-Anne-de-la-Pérade, in 1938, Eugène Mailhot, busy cutting blocks of ice for the family cooler, discovered that fish were spawning in the Sainte-Anne River.

The tourist vocation of small fish fishing developed in the 1940s, when visitors arrived by train to take advantage of this Christmas gift, suppliers transported travelers from the train station to the river in their dog sleds.

Having become a tradition, as soon as the ice permits, in December, the mouth of the Sainte-Anne comes alive to create what will become the world capital of Tommy Cod fishing. During the season, officially from December 26 to February 14, thousands of tourists arrive from all over the world to fish in this fishing village built on the frozen waters of the Sainte-Anne.

The fishing cabins are rented day from 08:00 to 18:00 and night 20:00 to 06:00, they are heated by wood or electricity, a table, benches, chairs, sometimes a couch, a radio and even a television set constitute the furniture. Fishing is done in holes drilled in the floor and in the ice below. Lines suspended above the hole have a weight and two hooks. Raw shrimp or frozen cubes of porc liver serve as bait. Catches are between 150 and 200 fish, per cabin, per rental period.

Tommy Cod Fishing - Cabin and Fishermen

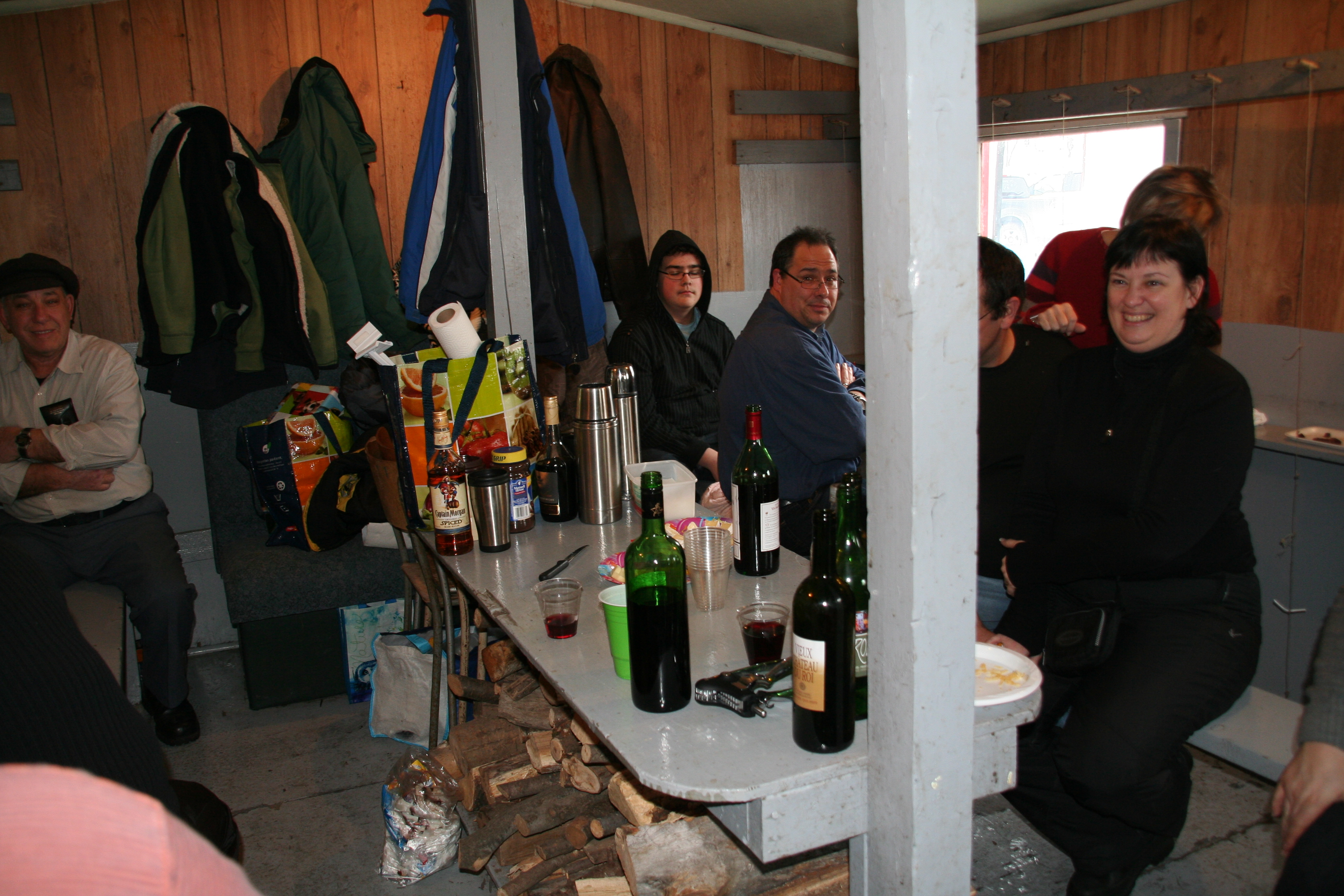
Each group settles into their rental cabin in their own way

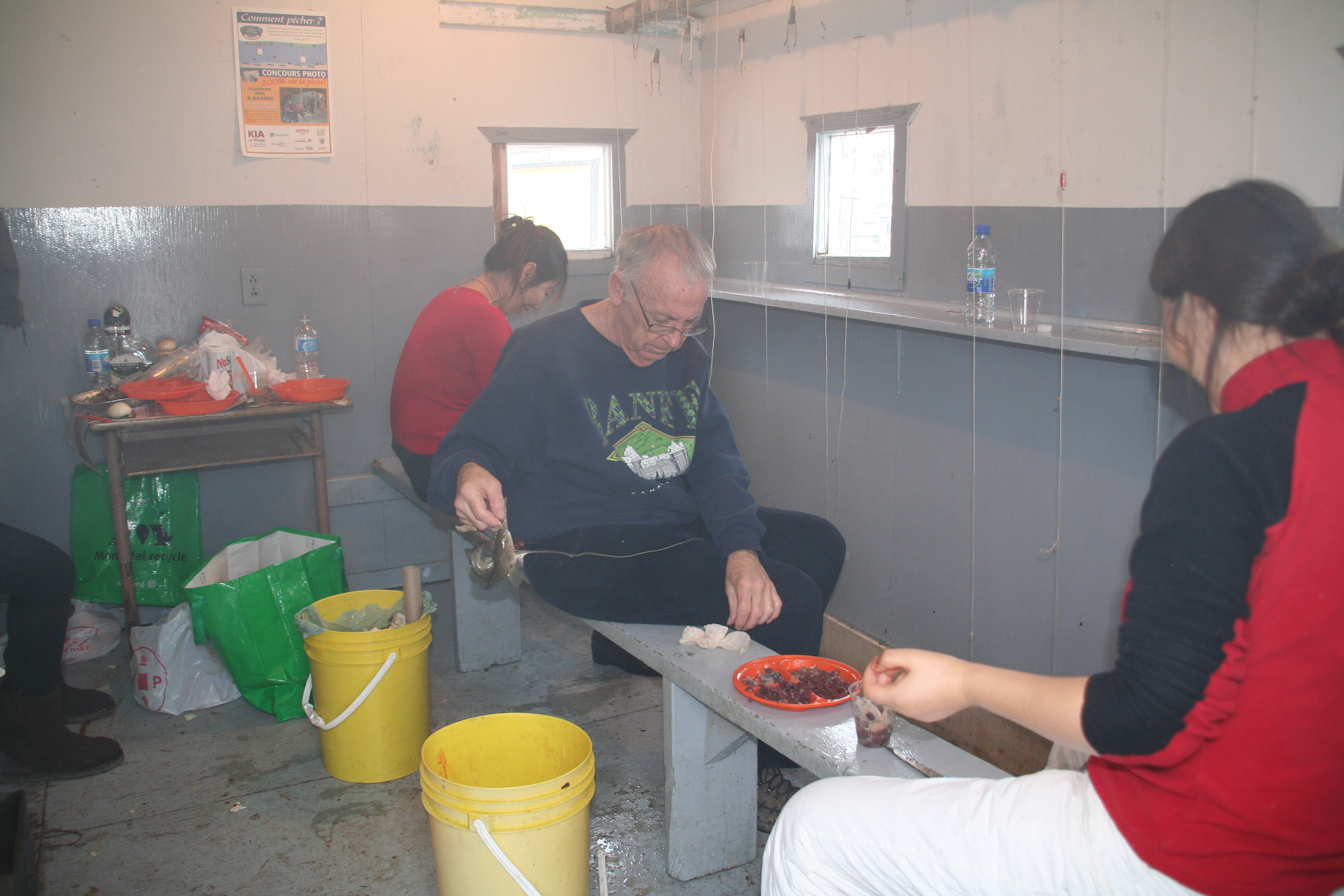
A bench faces the hole drilled in the ice

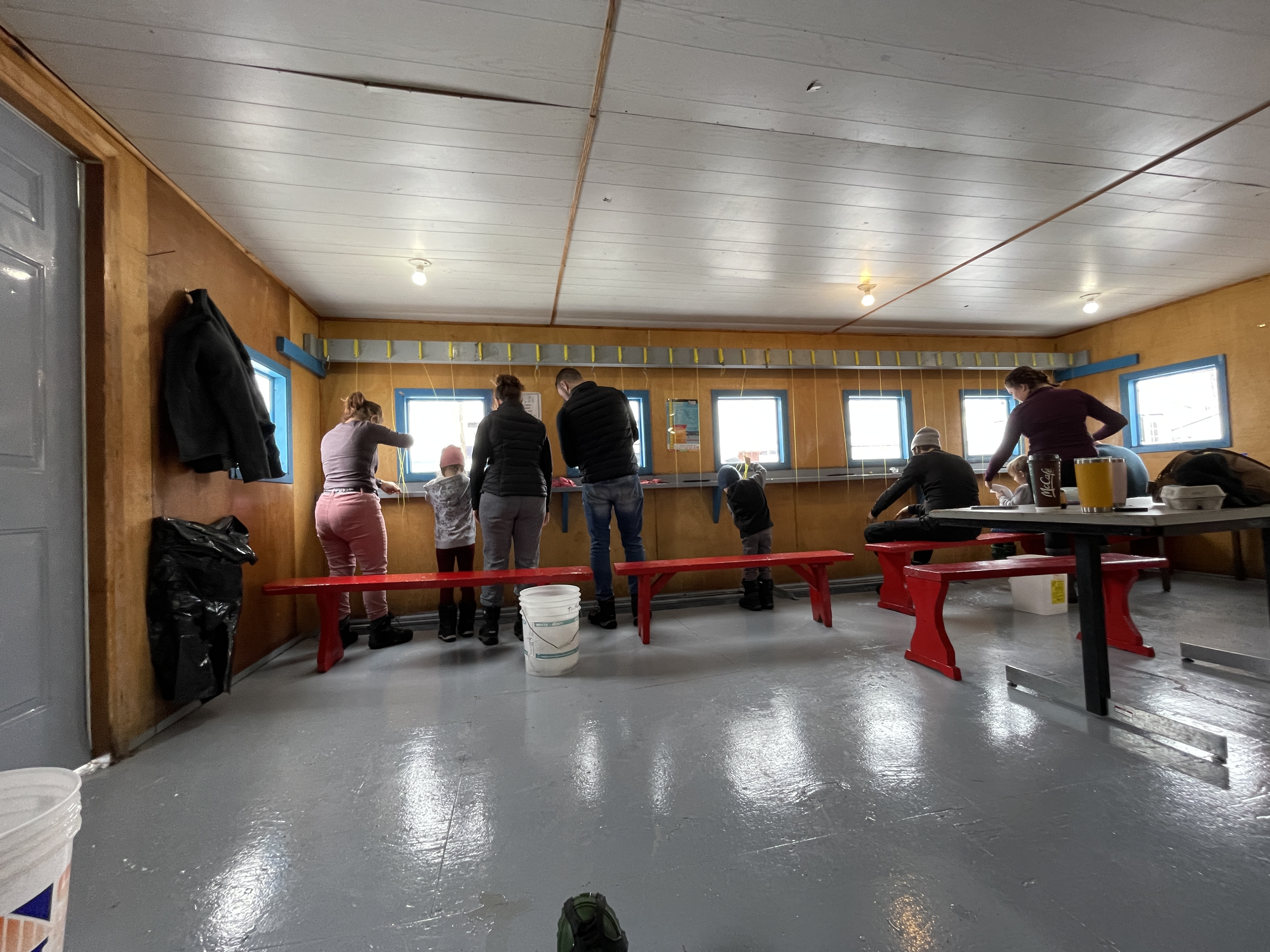
Inside a large fishing hut, group of 4 friendly families, from Montreal area

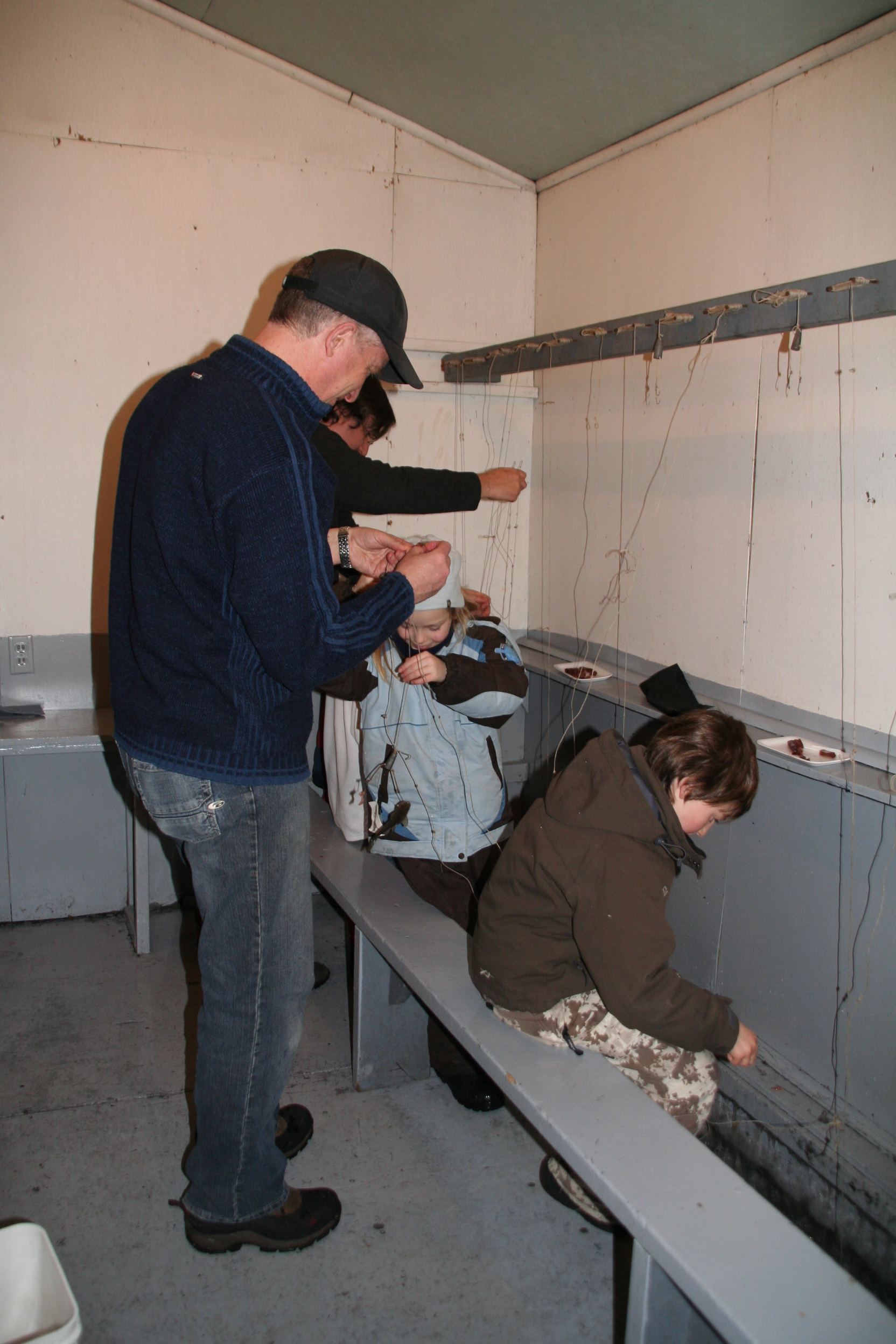
Inside fishing hut 22, small and large fishermen

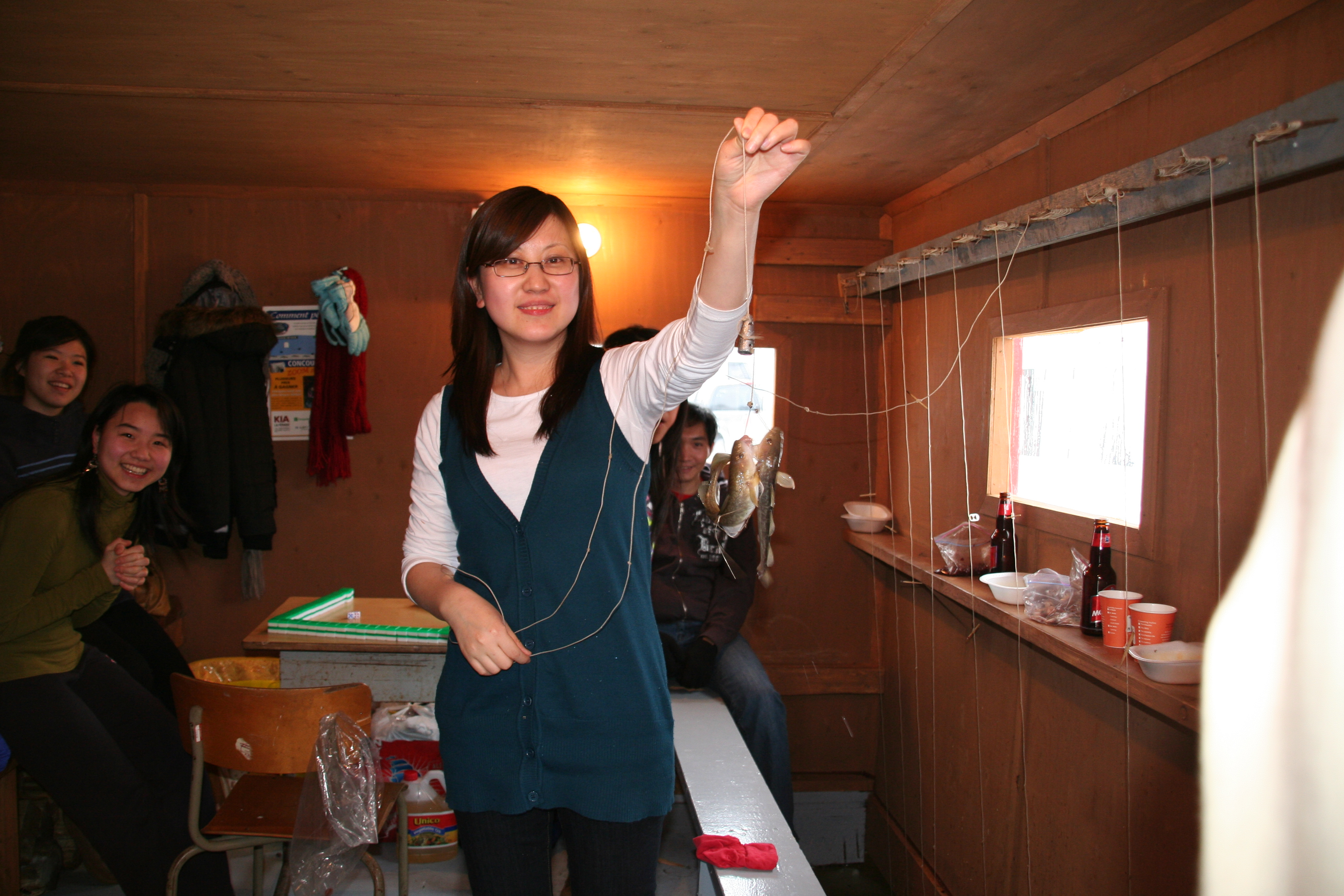
Visitor proud of her catch

This temporary village, crisscrossed by a few roads, is lively day and night with outdoor activities, fishing, ice skating, tobogganing, little train rides, snowmobile, restaurants and others.

Ice Fishing Village - Sainte-Anne River

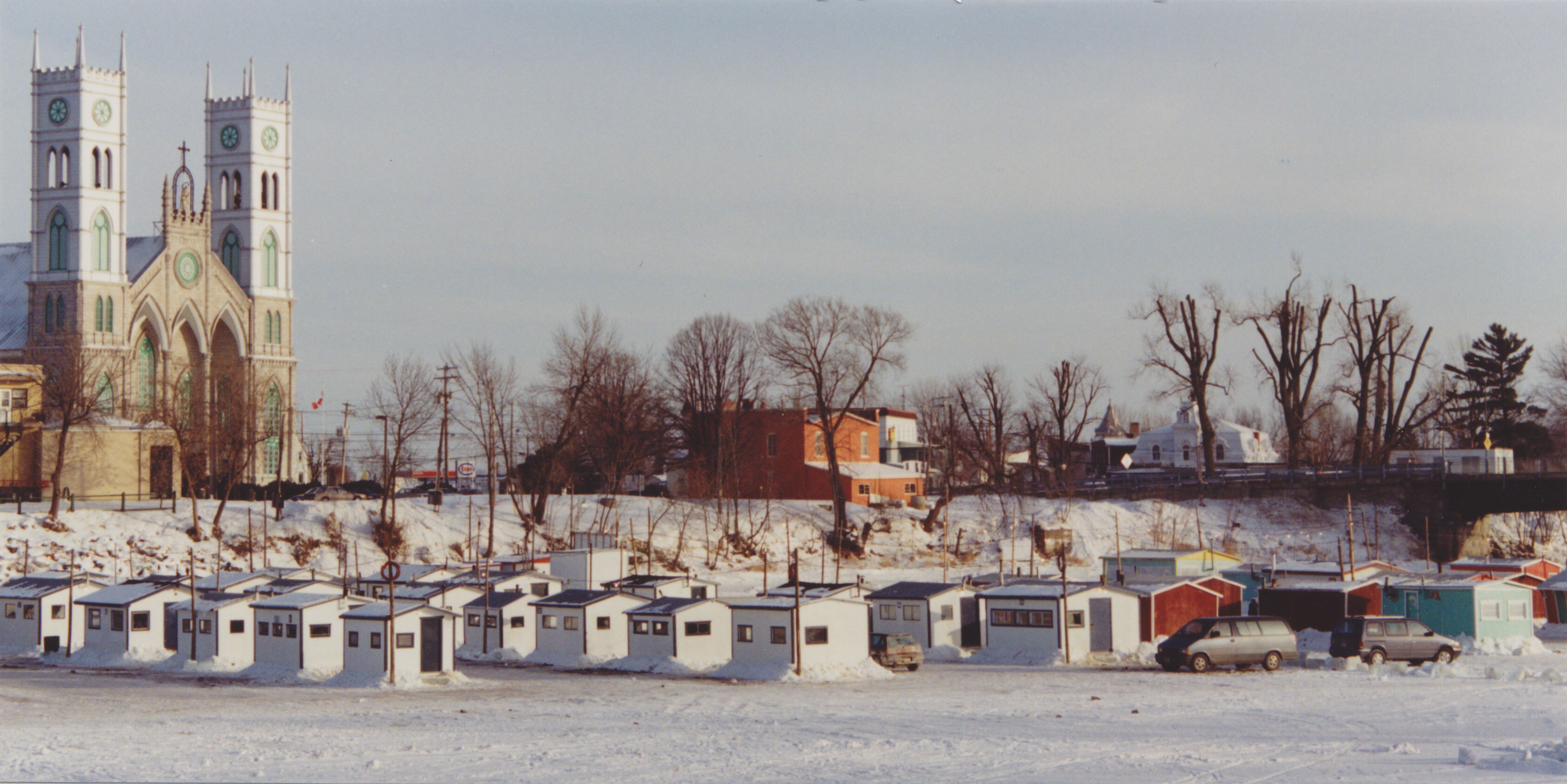
Sainte-Anne-de-la-Pérade and it's seasonal village

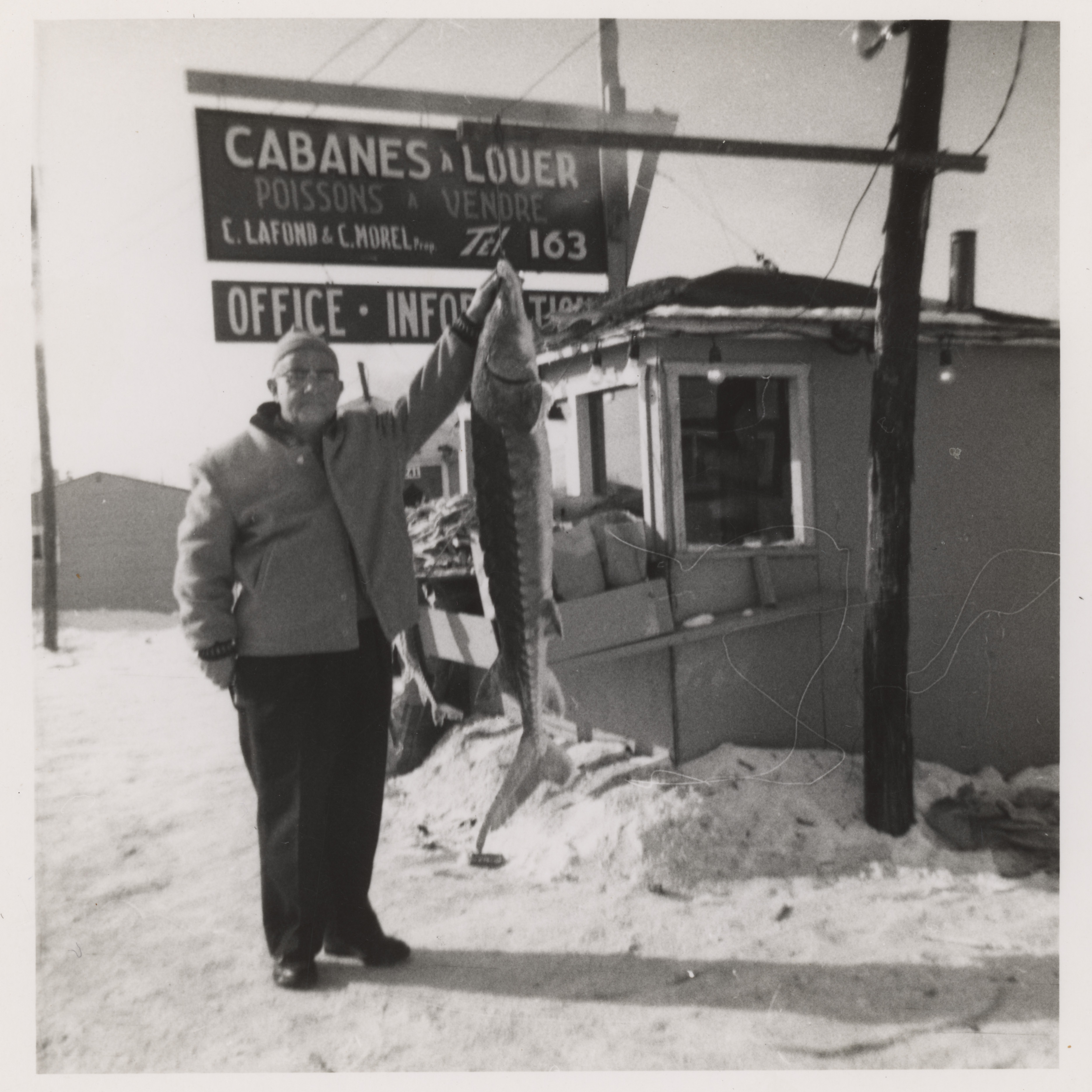
Cabins for rent, fish for sale, office information, good-sized sturgeon

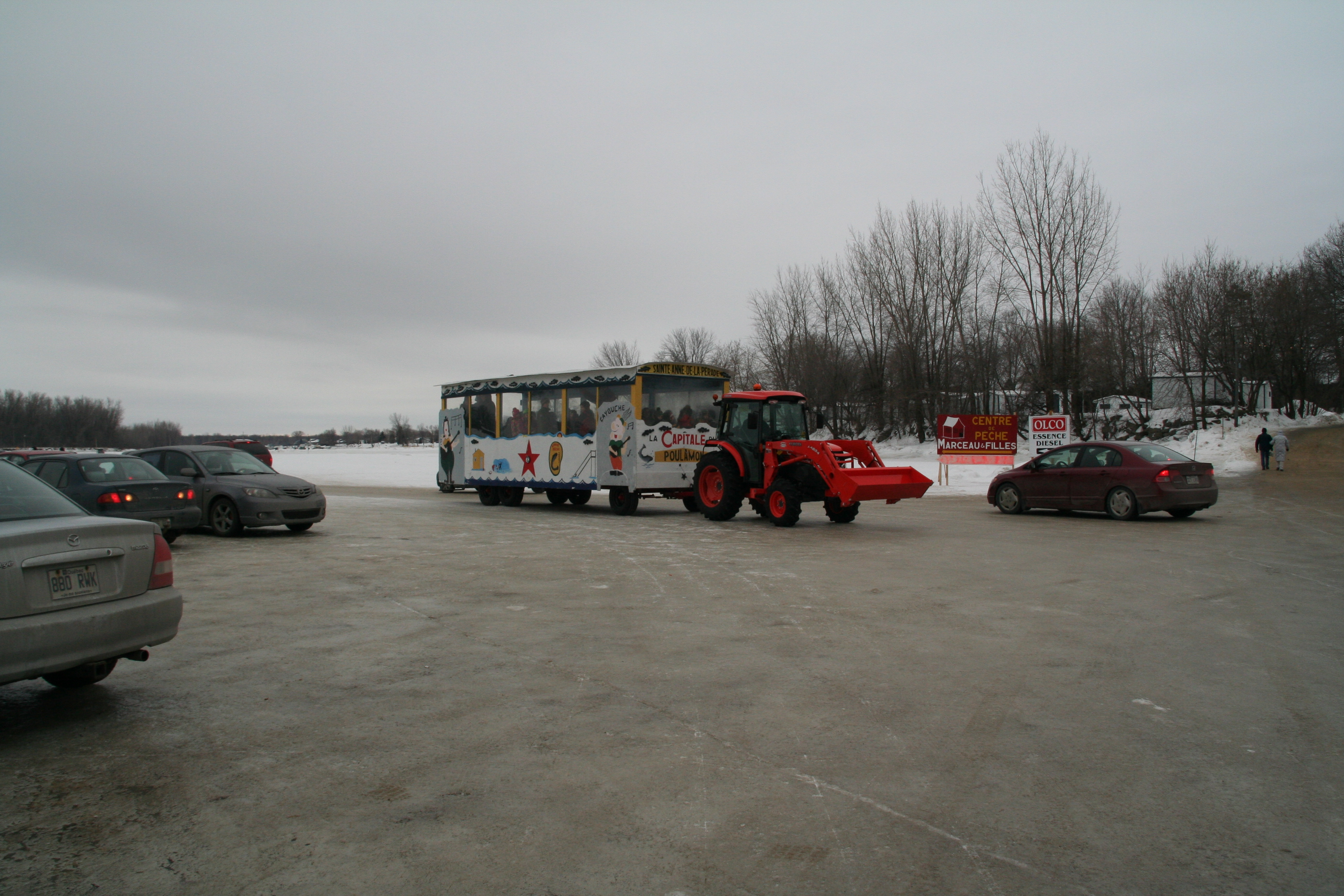
Sightseeing in a train pulled by a tractor, automobiles near descent # 3

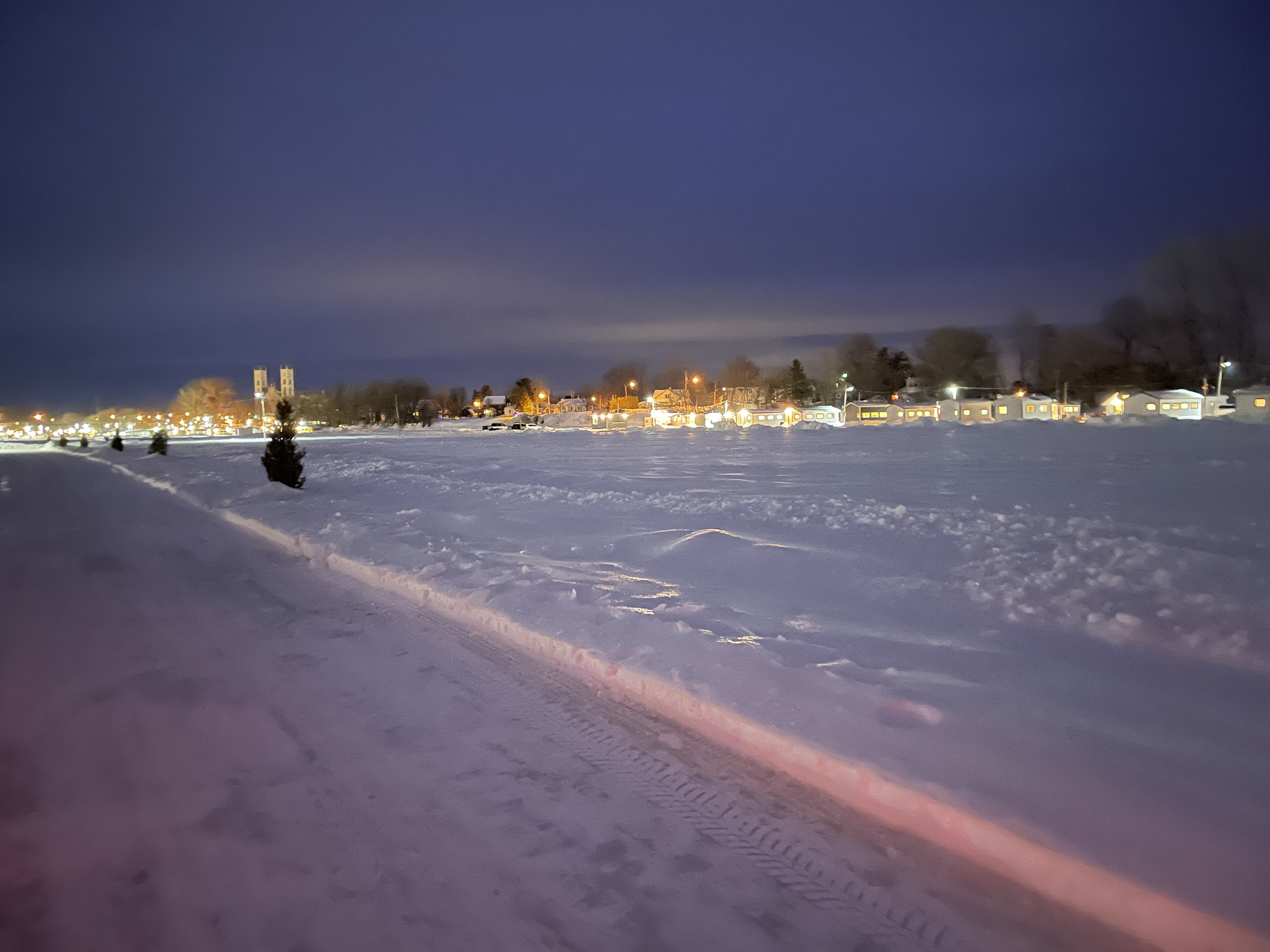
Road near the river mouth in St. Lawrence River
Sainte-Anne-de-la-Pérade - Another Village Rises

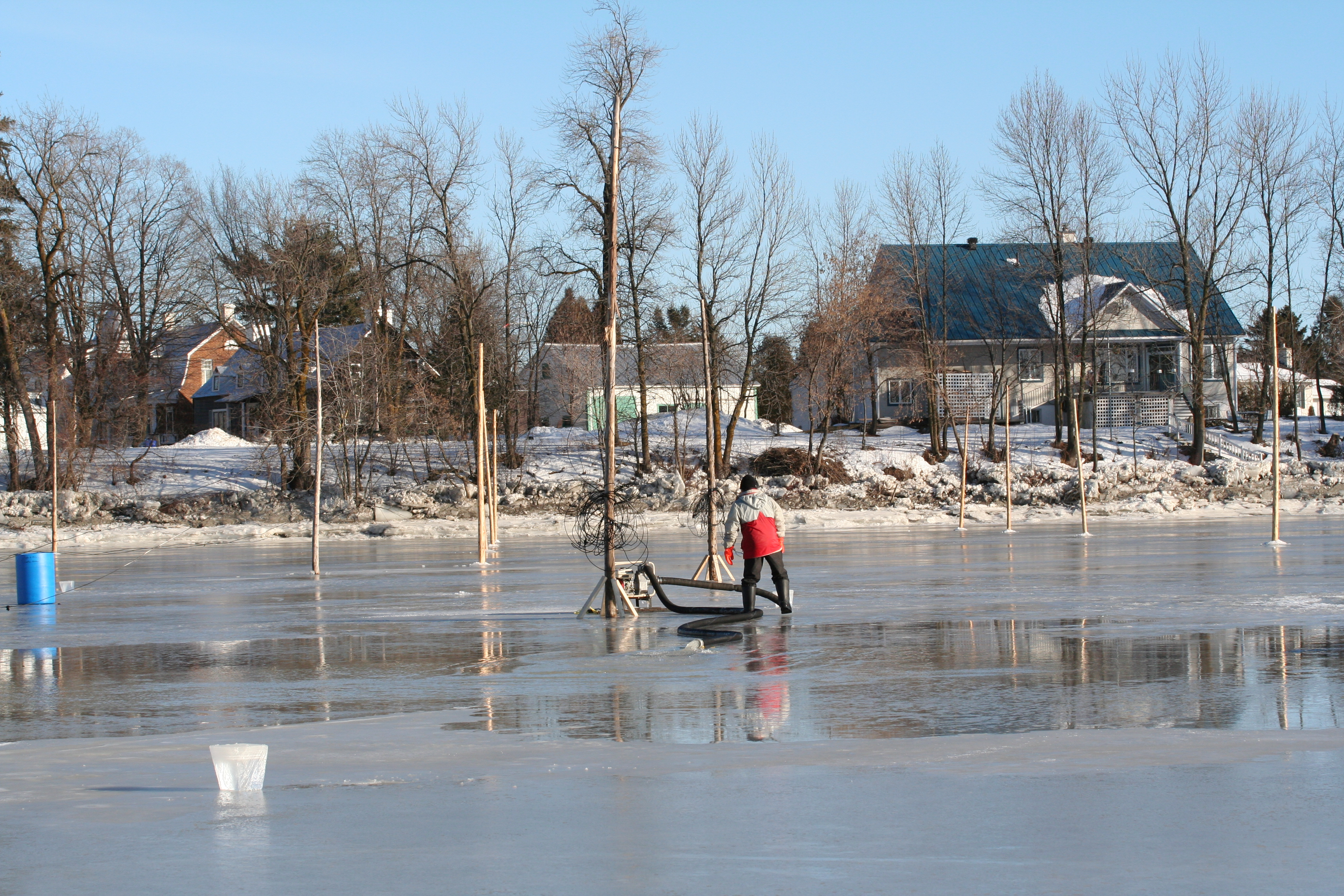
Strengthening ice by watering

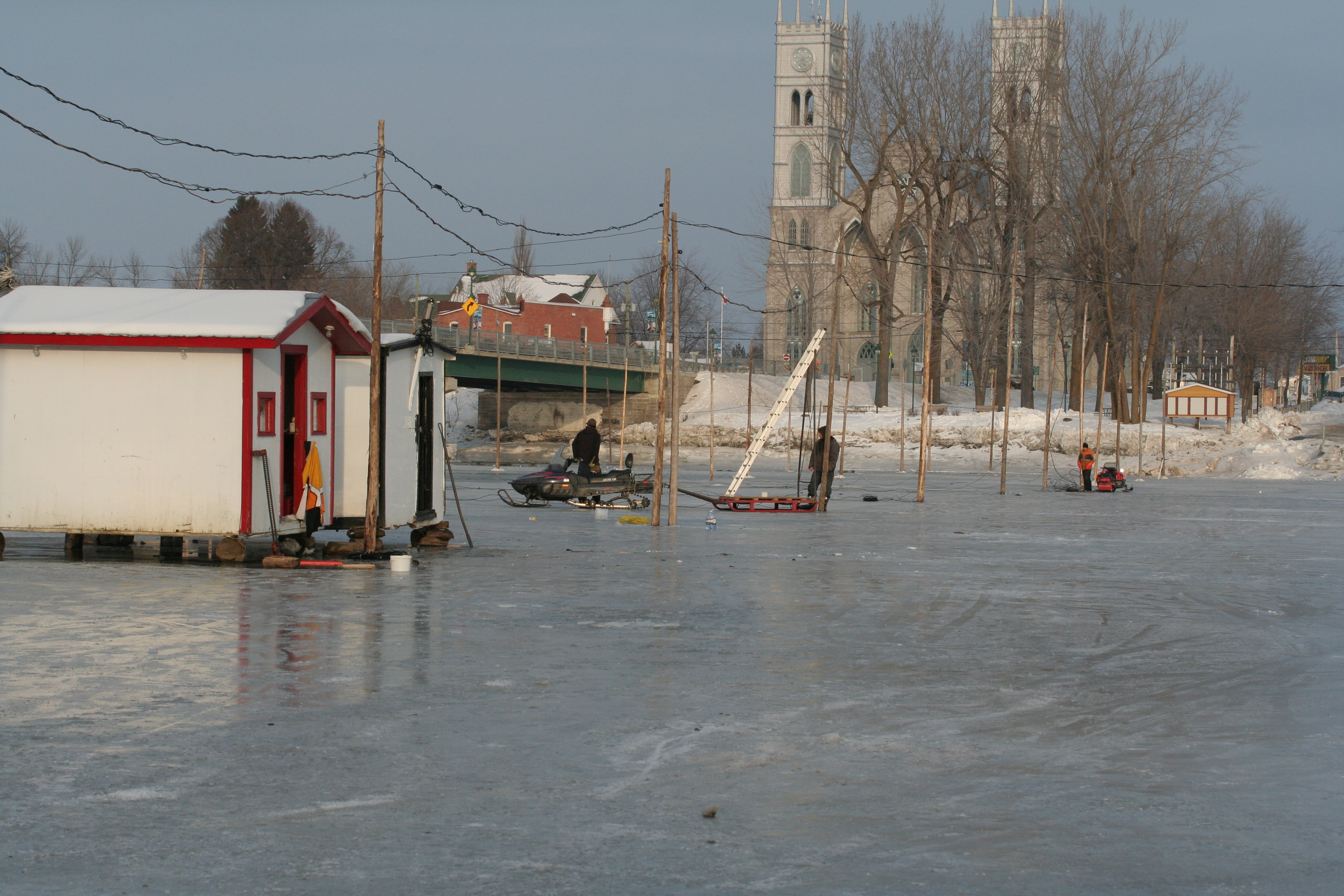
Installation of the electrical network

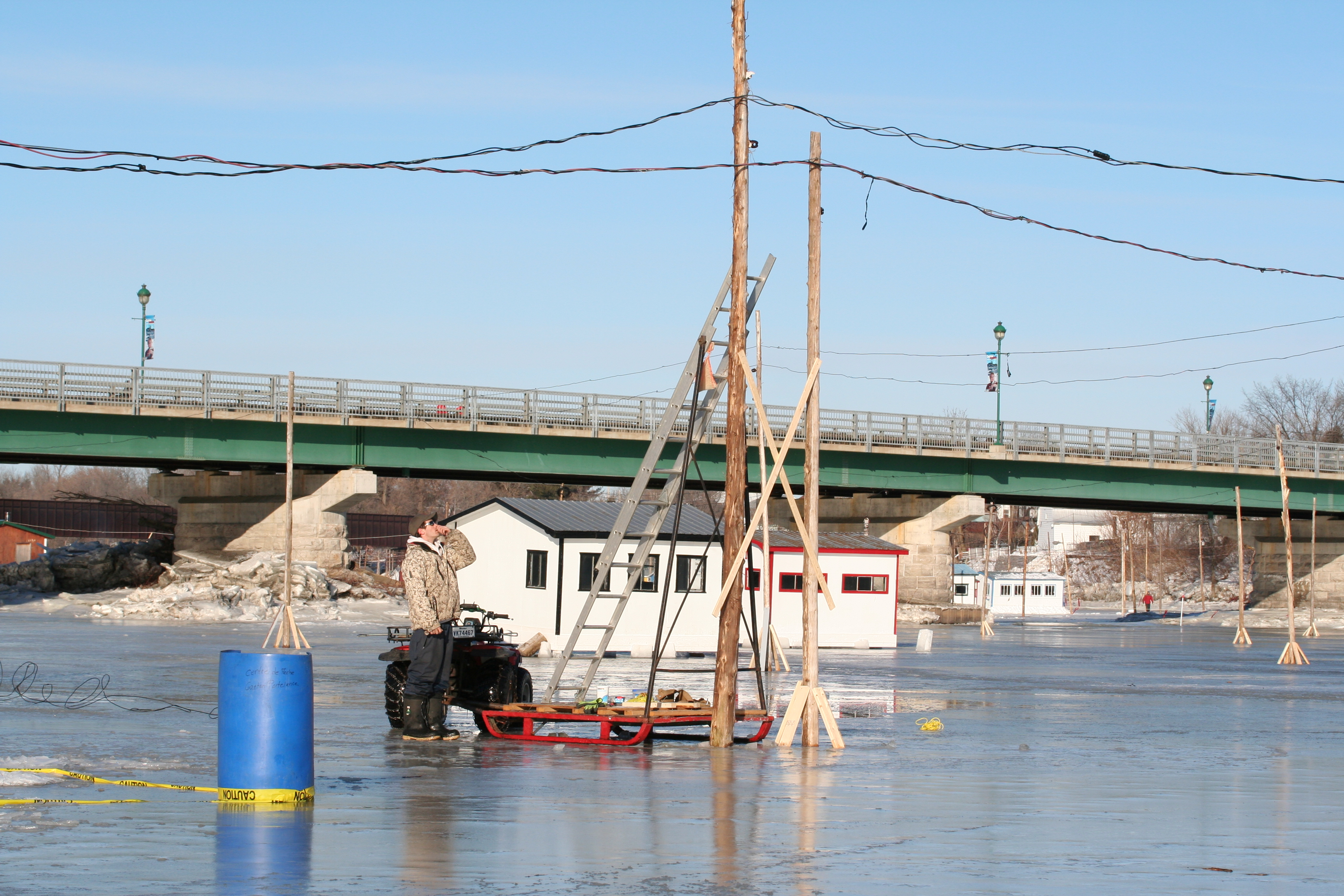
Electrical poles and wires

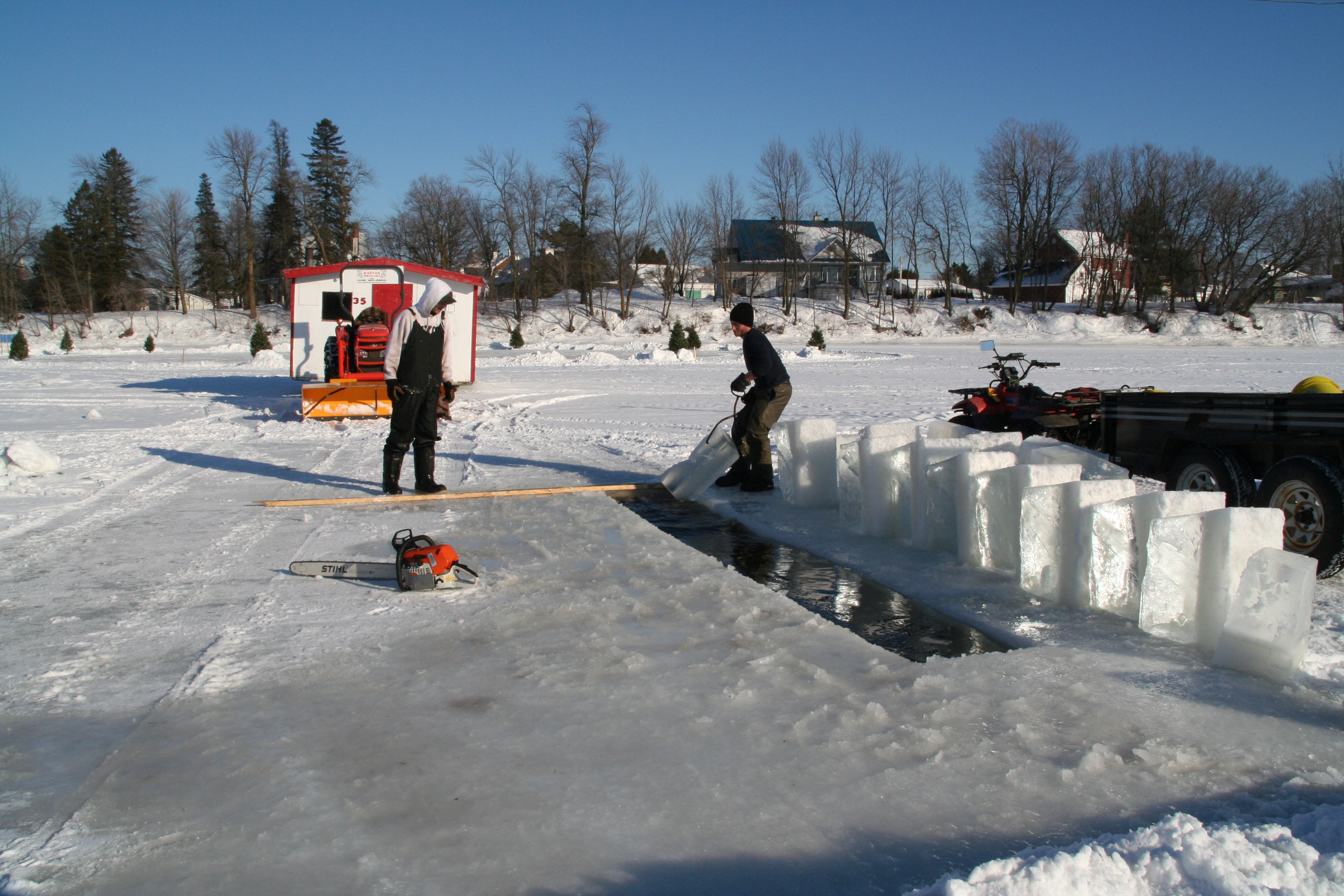
Hole and ice blocks

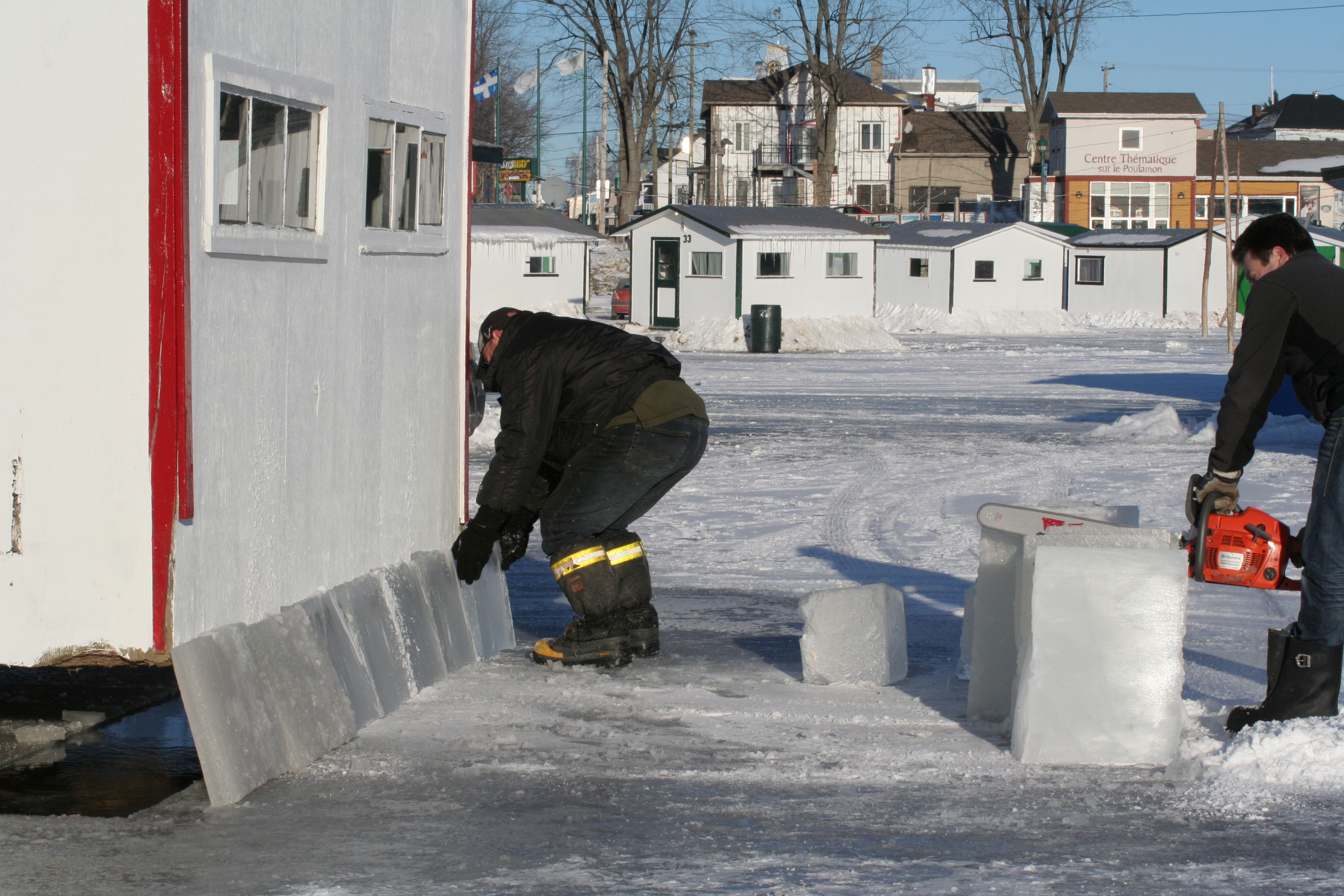
Resurfacing a cabin with ice, which will be covered with snow

== See also ==
- Sainte-Anne-de-la-Pérade municipality
- Saint-Alban municipality
- Saint-Casimir municipality
- Lordship of Sainte-Anne-de-la-Pérade history
- Blanche River Saint-Casimir
- Portneuf Regional County Municipality RCM
- Les Chenaux Regional County Municipality RCM
- List of rivers of Quebec and one million lakes
