= Saint-Léonard-de-Portneuf =

- Municipality
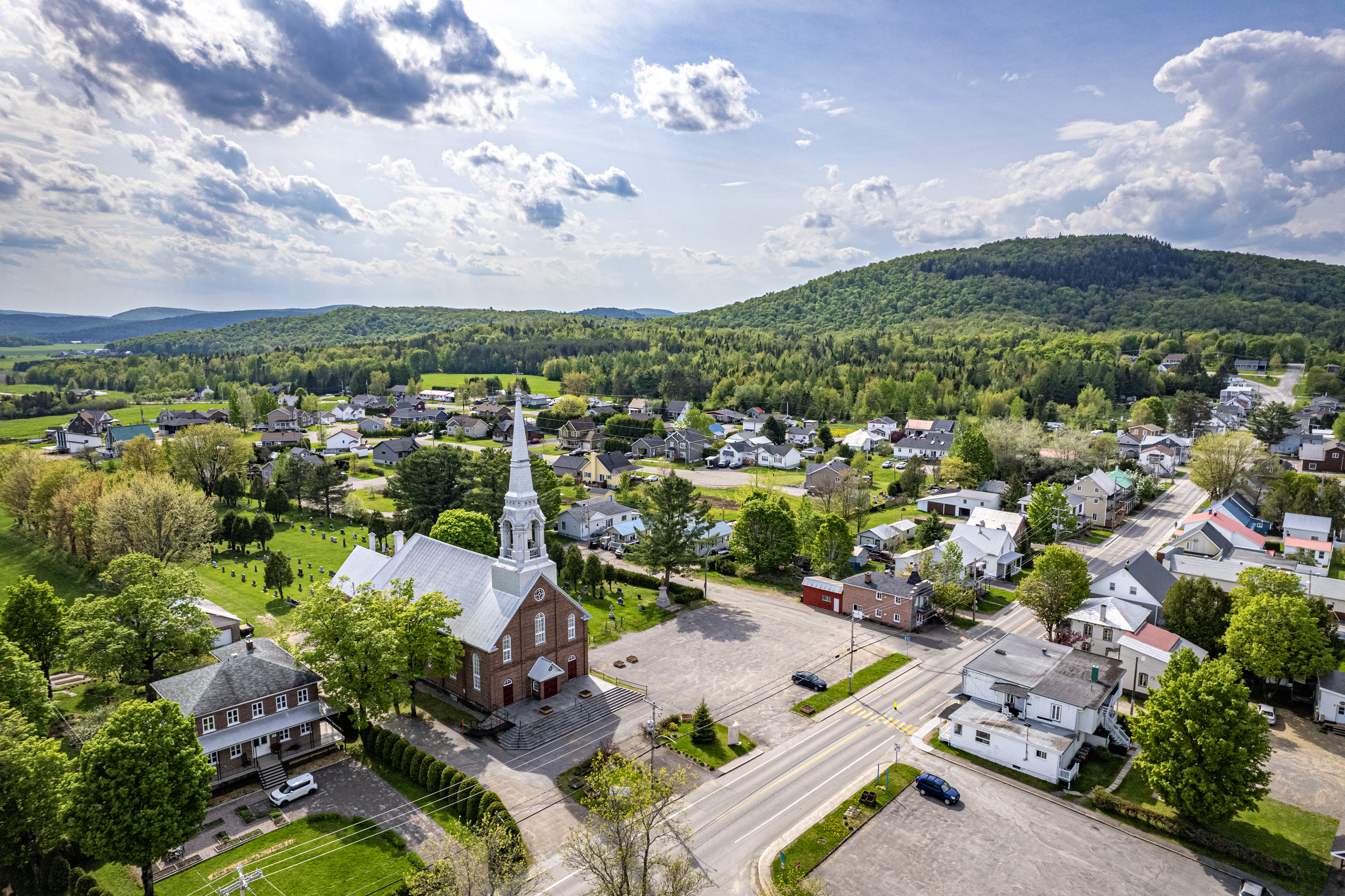

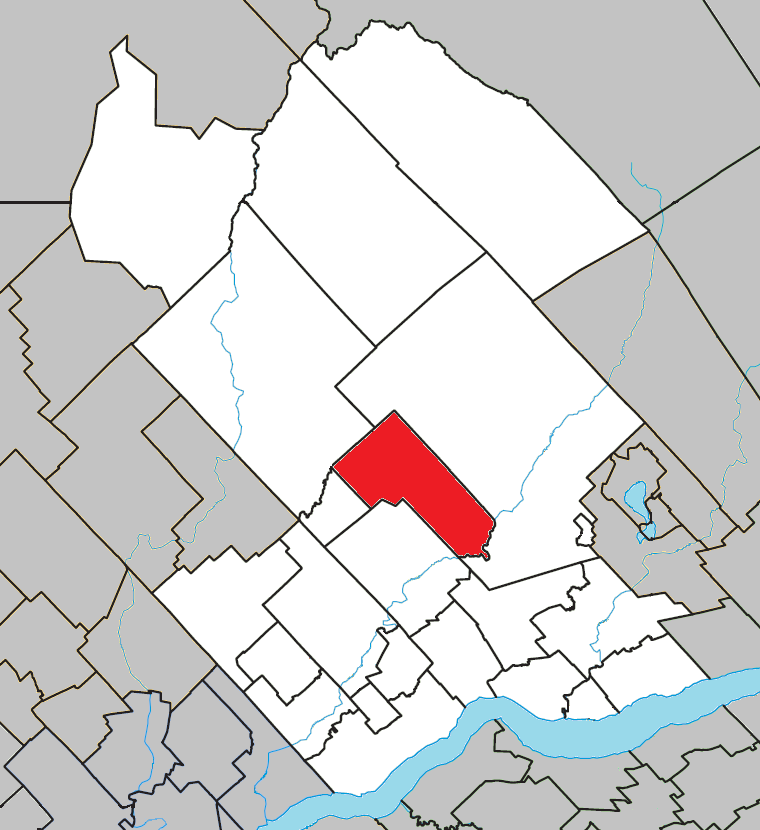
- Location within Portneuf RCM

- Location in central Quebec
- Coordinates: 46°53′N 71°55′W
- Country: Canada
- Province: Quebec
- Region: Capitale-Nationale
- RCM: Portneuf
- Constituted: July 22, 1899

Government
  - Mayor: Archill Gladu
  - Fed. riding: Saint-Augustin—Portneuf—Jacques-Cartier
  - Prov. riding: Portneuf

Area
  - Total: 145.68 km^{2} (56.25 sq mi)
  - Land: 141.80 km^{2} (54.75 sq mi)

Population (2021)
  - Total: 1,140
  - Density: 2.4/km^{2} (6.2/sq mi)
  - Pop (2016-21): ▲2.4%
  - Dwellings: 659
- Time zone: UTC−5 (EST)
  - Summer (DST): UTC−4 (EDT)
- Postal code(s): G0A 4A0
- Area codes: 418, 581
- Highways: R-367
- Website: st-leonard.com

Saint-Léonard-de-Portneuf (French pronunciation: [sɛ̃ leɔnaʁ də pɔʁnœf]) is a municipality in the Capitale-Nationale region of Quebec, Canada.

== History ==
In 1897, the Parish of Saint-Léonard-de-Port-Maurice was formed, named after Leonard of Port Maurice (1676-1751). In 1899, the namesake parish municipality was created when it split off from Saint Raymond Nonnat, and that same year, the post office opened under the name Saint-Léonard-de-Portneuf. In 1950, the Parish Municipality of Saint-Léonard-de-Port-Maurice changed statutes and name to become the Municipality of Saint-Léonard-de-Portneuf.

== Demographics ==
Historical census populations – Saint-Léonard-de-Portneuf

| Year | Pop. | ±% |
|---|---|---|
| 1901 | 765 | — |
| 1911 | 896 | +17.1% |
| 1921 | 821 | −8.4% |
| 1931 | 924 | +12.5% |
| 1941 | 1,065 | +15.3% |
| 1951 | 1,162 | +9.1% |
| 1956 | 1,154 | −0.7% |

| Year | Pop. | ±% |
|---|---|---|
| 1961 | 1,183 | +2.5% |
| 1966 | 1,142 | −3.5% |
| 1971 | 1,093 | −4.3% |
| 1976 | 1,046 | −4.3% |
| 1981 | 1,059 | +1.2% |
| 1986 | 994 | −6.1% |
| 1991 | 997 | +0.3% |

| Year | Pop. | ±% |
|---|---|---|
| 1996 | 988 | −0.9% |
| 2001 | 1,010 | +2.2% |
| 2006 | 1,046 | +3.6% |
| 2011 | 1,019 | −2.6% |
| 2016 | 1,113 | +9.2% |
| 2021 | 1,140 | +2.4% |

Source: Statistics Canada

Private dwellings occupied by usual residents (2021): 523 (total dwellings: 659)

Mother tongue (2021):

- English as first language: 0.4%
- French as first language: 98.2%
- English and French as first languages: 0%
- Other as first language: 0.4%
