= Emeraude Lake =

Lake in Saint-Ubalde, Quebec, Canada

Émeraude Lake
- Location in Quebec
- Location: Saint-Ubalde, Portneuf Regional County Municipality, Capitale-Nationale, Quebec, Canada
- Coordinates: 46.82083°N 72.23472°W
- Lake type: Natural
- Primary inflows: Discharge of two small lakes including Lac à la Hache
- Primary outflows: Discharge from Emerald Lake leading to the northeast shore of Blanc Lake
- Basin countries: Canada
- Max. length: 2.1 km (1.3 mi)
- Max. width: 1.3 km (0.81 mi)
- Surface elevation: 176 m (577 ft)

The lac Émeraude is located in the northern part of the municipality of Saint-Ubalde, in the MRC of Portneuf Regional County Municipality, in the administrative region of the Capitale-Nationale, in the province of Quebec, in Canada.

This lake is famous for the Montagne du Lac Émeraude and is linked to the Portneuf Regional Natural Park and for vacationing because around forty chalets are built there.

The northwest and south of the lake is served by Chemin du Lac-Émeraude. The northern and eastern parts of the lake are served by secondary forest roads.

Forestry is the main economic activity in the sector; recreational tourism, second.

The surface of Emauraude Lake is usually frozen from the beginning of December to the end of March, however the safe circulation on the ice is generally made from mid-December to mid-March.

== Geography ==
With a length of 2.1 kilometres (1.3 mi) and a maximum width of 1.3 kilometres (0.81 mi), Emerald Lake looks like a triangle with its eastern side backed by a cliff of height of 64 metres (210 ft) of the Emerald Lake Mountain whose summit reaches 240 metres (790 ft). This lake has five small bays which each take the shape of a small triangle. This lake is located entirely in the forest.

Emerald Lake is located 0.8 kilometres (0.50 mi) southwest of the boundary of the Portneuf Regional Natural Park. Comprising 70 kilometres (43.50 mi), this park includes the Long lakes, Montauban, Carillon, Sept Îles, Lac en Coeur, "À l'Anguille" and some other more secondary bodies of water. This park is popular for recreational and tourist activities: hiking trails, cross-country skiing, boat launching ramp ... A 5.1 km bike path links Lac Blanc and Lac Carillon in skirting the Emerald Lake Mountain.

The mouth of Emerald Lake is located at the bottom of a small bay on the northwest shore. From there, the current flows on:

- 1.9 kilometres (1.2 mi) north-west, then south-west, to a bay on the north-east shore of Blanc Lake;
- 4.1 kilometres (2.5 mi) to the southwest, then to the south, crossing Blanc Lake;
- 29.25 kilometres (18.18 mi) to the south by the Blanche River;
- 1.8 kilometres (1.1 mi) to the south by the Noire River;
- 11.5 kilometres (7.1 mi) southwards by the Sainte-Anne River which flows on the northwest bank of the Saint-Laurent river.

== Toponymy ==
The term "Emeraud" turns out to be a family name. While the term "Emerald" refers to a mineral, from the group of silicate s, subgroup of cyclosilicate s, variety of beryl, whose green color comes from traces of chromium, vanadium and sometimes iron. The emerald is, with diamond, sapphire and ruby, one of the four precious stones.

The toponym "Lac Émeraude" (Portneuf) was registered on June 7, 1996, in the Place Names Bank of the Commission de toponymie du Québec.

== See also ==
- Portneuf Regional County Municipality (MRC)
- Saint-Ubalde
- Portneuf Regional Natural Park
- Blanc Lake
