= Blanc Lake =

Lake in Saint-Ubalde, Quebec, Canada

- Location in Quebec
- Location: Saint-Ubalde, Portneuf Regional County Municipality, Capitale-Nationale, Quebec, Canada
- Coordinates: 46.81916°N 72.27167°W
- Lake type: Natural
- Primary inflows: (Clockwise from the mouth) Rivière des Pins (Blanc Lake), outlet of Emeraude Lake (Saint-Ubalde), the outlet of a series of lakes: Rond, "à Francis", Travers, Perron, Perreault and lac Froid.
- Primary outflows: Blanche River
- Basin countries: Canada
- Max. length: 3.9 km (2.4 mi)
- Max. width: 1.1 km (0.68 mi)
- Surface elevation: 143 m (469 ft)

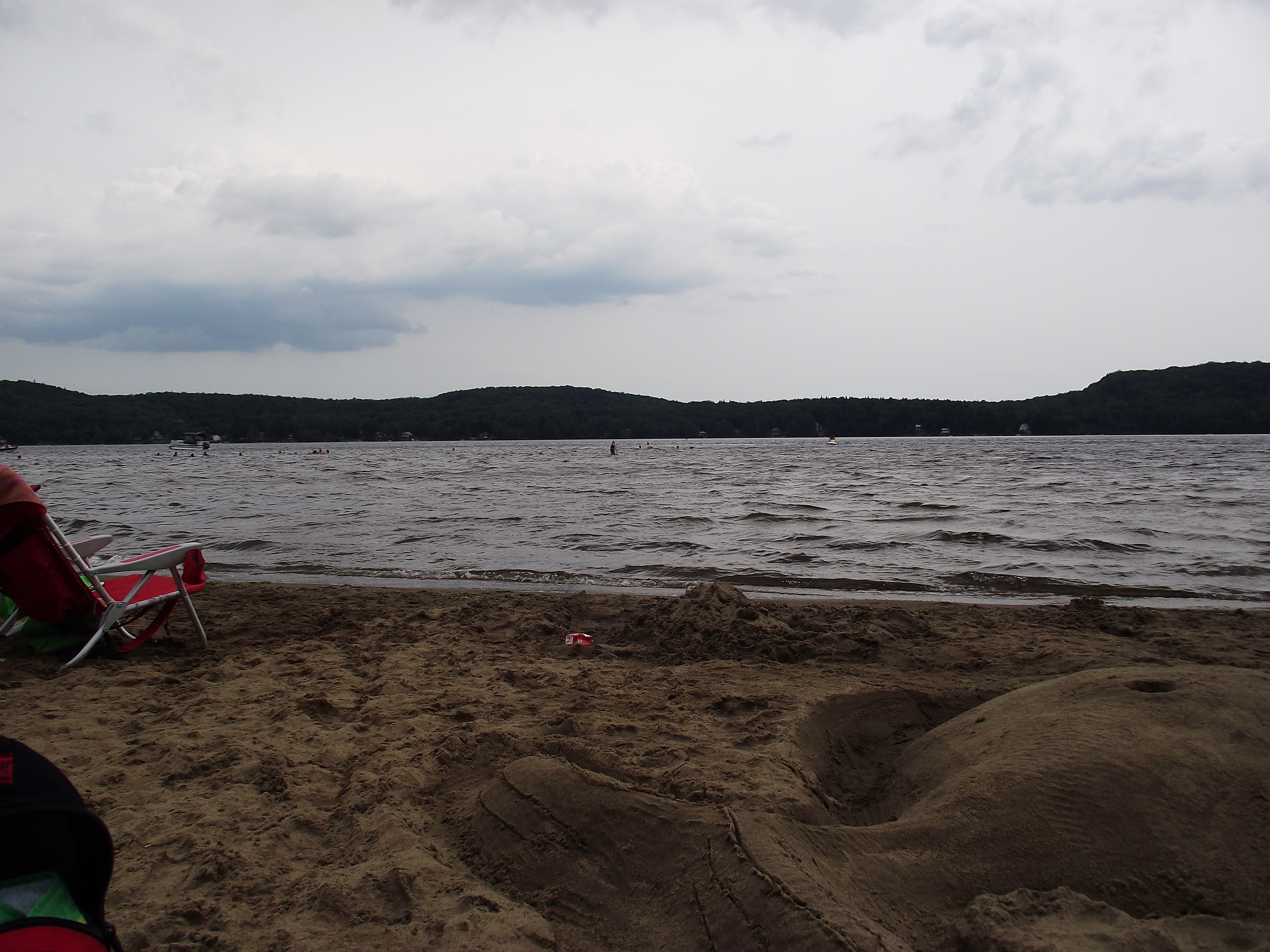

The Lac Blanc is located in the northern part of the municipality of Saint-Ubalde, in the MRC of Portneuf Regional County Municipality, in the administrative region of the Capitale-Nationale, in the province of Quebec, in Canada.

The northwest and south of the lake is served by Chemin du Lac-Émeraude. The northern and eastern parts of the lake are served by secondary forest roads.

Recreational and tourist activities (especially vacationing) constitute the main economic activity in the sector; forestry, second. This lake is linked to Portneuf Regional Natural Park via a 5.1 km cycle path connecting Lac Blanc to Sept Îles Lake.

The surface of Lac Blanc is usually frozen from the beginning of December to the end of March, however the safe circulation on the ice is generally made from mid-December to mid-March.

== Geography ==
Lac Blanc has a length of 3.9 kilometres (2.4 mi) and an altitude of 143 metres (469 ft). He gets his supplies from:

- north side: the Rivière des Pins which receives the waters of "Lac des Pins" (altitude of 183 m), located further north. The latter obtains supplies from the outlet of a series of lakes: Gervais, "du Canard", Saint-Laurent, "de la Galette" and "à l'Équerre";
- northeast side: the outlet of Emeraude Lake (altitude: 176 m) (located near the Lac Richard mountain);
- southwest side: the outlet of a series of lakes: Rond (174 m), "à Francis" (155 m), Travers (161 m), Perron (189 m), Perreault (185 m)) and the Lac Froid (197 m).

Lac Blanc is renowned for its resort and recreational tourism activities, including camping and nautical activities. The "Montagne du Lac Blanc" (English: White Lake Mountain), whose summit reaches 228 metres (748 ft), is located on the west side of the lake. The mouth of the lake is located at the bottom of the southwest bay of the lake.

Lac Blanc is located southwest of the boundary of the Portneuf Regional Natural Park. Comprising 70 kilometres (43.50 mi), this park includes the Long lakes, Montauban, Carillon, Sept Îles, Lac en Coeur, "À l'Anguille" and some other more secondary bodies of water. This park is popular for recreational and tourist activities: hiking trails, cross-country skiing, boat launching ramp... A 5.1 kilometres (3.2 mi) bike path connects the Lac Blanc and Carillon Lake, bypassing the Emerald Lake Mountain.

The mouth of Lac Blanc is located at the bottom of a small bay on the southwest shore. From there, the current flows on:

- 29.25 kilometres (18.18 mi) to the south by the Blanche River;
- 1.8 kilometres (1.1 mi) to the south by the Noire River;
- 11.5 kilometres (7.1 mi) towards the south by the Sainte-Anne River which flows on the northwest bank of the Saint-Laurent river.

== Toponymy ==
The toponym "Lac Blanc" (Saint-Ubalde) was registered on December 5, 1968, in the Place Names Bank of the Commission de toponymie du Québec.

== See also ==
- Portneuf Regional County Municipality (MRC)
- Saint-Ubalde
- Portneuf Regional Natural Park
- Carillon Lake
- Rivière aux Pins
