= Niagarette River =

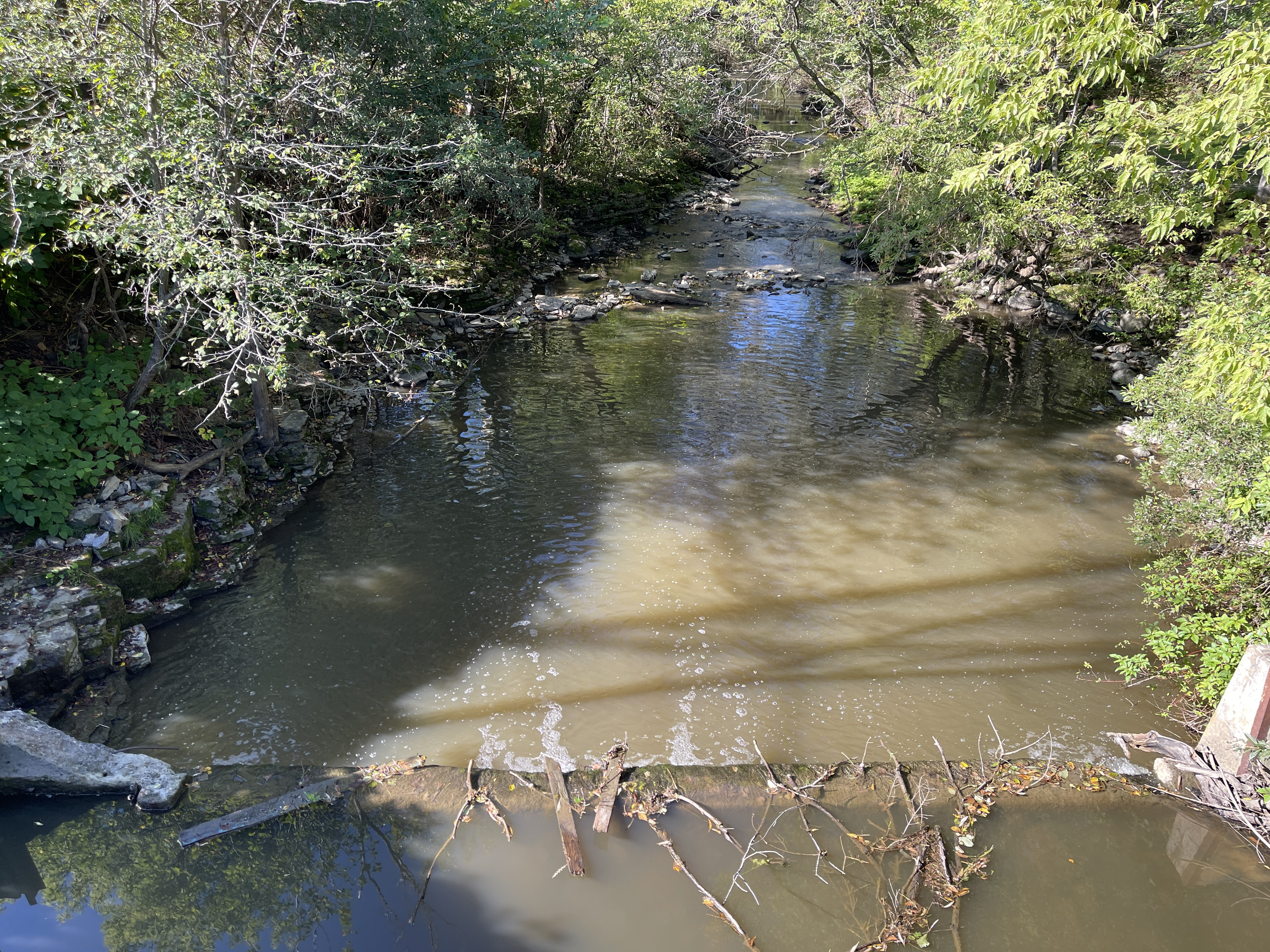
- Mountain Boulevard (Quebec Route 363), Saint-Casimir

- Location within Quebec

Location
- Country: Canada
- Province: Quebec
- Region administrative: Capitale-Nationale, Mauricie
- Regional County Municipality: Portneuf Regional County Municipality
- Municipalities: Saint-Ubalde, Saint-Thuribe, Saint-Casimir

Physical characteristics
- Source: Little unidentified lake
  - location: Saint-Ubalde, MRC Portneuf Regional County Municipality
  - coordinates: 46°44′15″N 72°12′48″W
  - elevation: 138 m (453 ft)
- Mouth: Blanche River
  - location: Saint-Casimir
  - coordinates: 46°39′08″N 72°08′28″W
  - elevation: 30 m (98 ft)
- Length: 20.3 km (12.6 mi)
- Discharge
  - location: Saint-Casimir

Basin features
- Tributaries
  - left: Décharge du lac Saint-Léon
  - right: (Upward from the mouth) Petite rivière Niagarette, rivière du Rang Saint-David.

The Niagarette River is a stream flowing in the municipalities of Saint-Ubalde, Saint-Thuribe and Saint-Casimir, in the Portneuf Regional County Municipality, in the administrative region of Capitale-Nationale, in Quebec, in Canada.

The first segment of 5.4 kilometres (3.4 mi) of the course of the Niagarette river is forest area; the rest of its route flows through an agricultural environment, while passing south of the village of Saint-Casimir at the end of the route.

The surface of the Niagarette River (except the rapids zones) is generally frozen from the beginning of December to the end of March, but the safe circulation on the ice is generally made from the end of December to the beginning of March.

== Geography ==
The watershed of the Niagarette river covers an area of 53.85 square kilometres (20.79 sq mi).

Niagarette River in Saint-Casimir

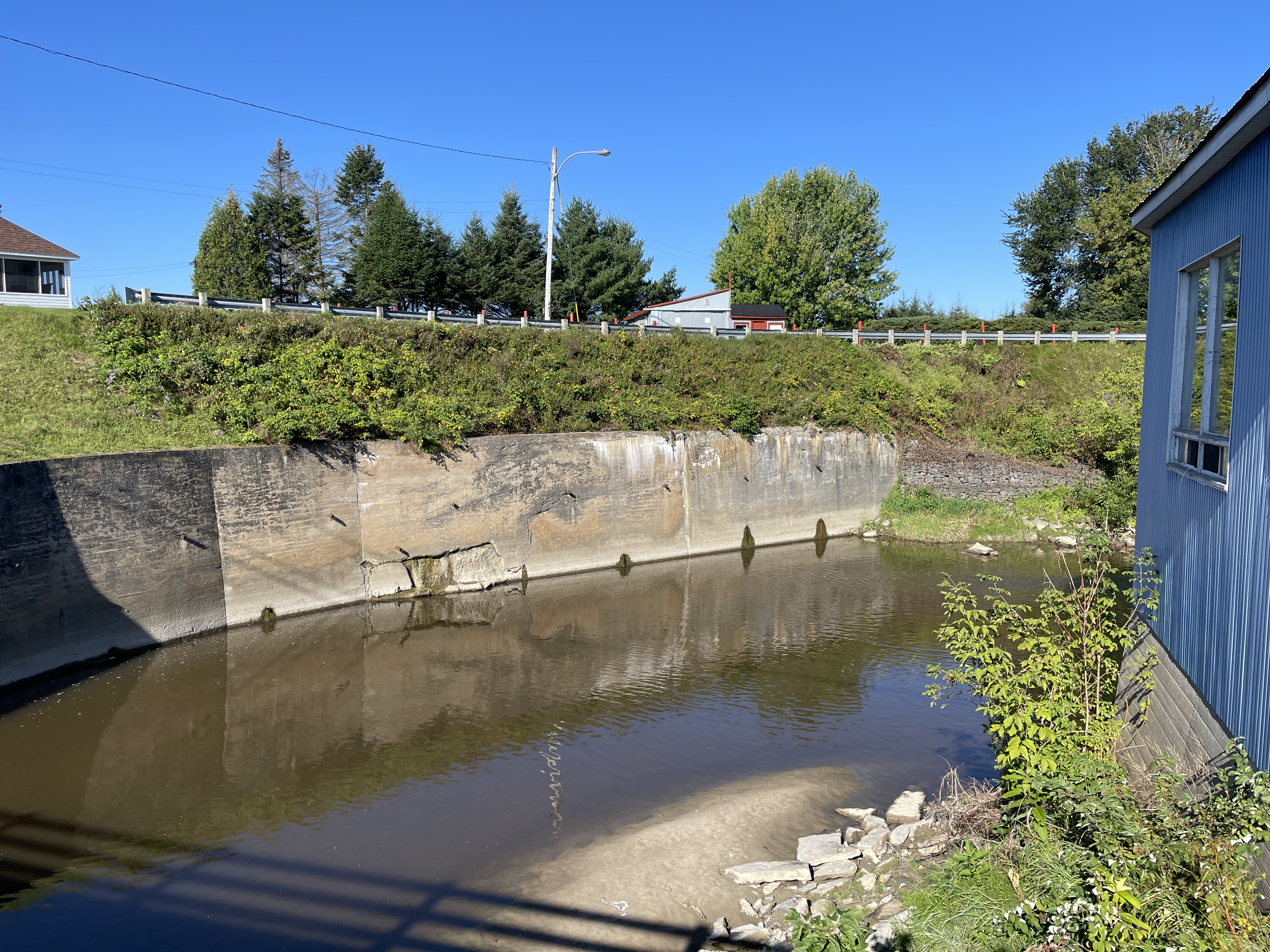
Rue Tessier (Quebec Route 354) from bridge P-16132

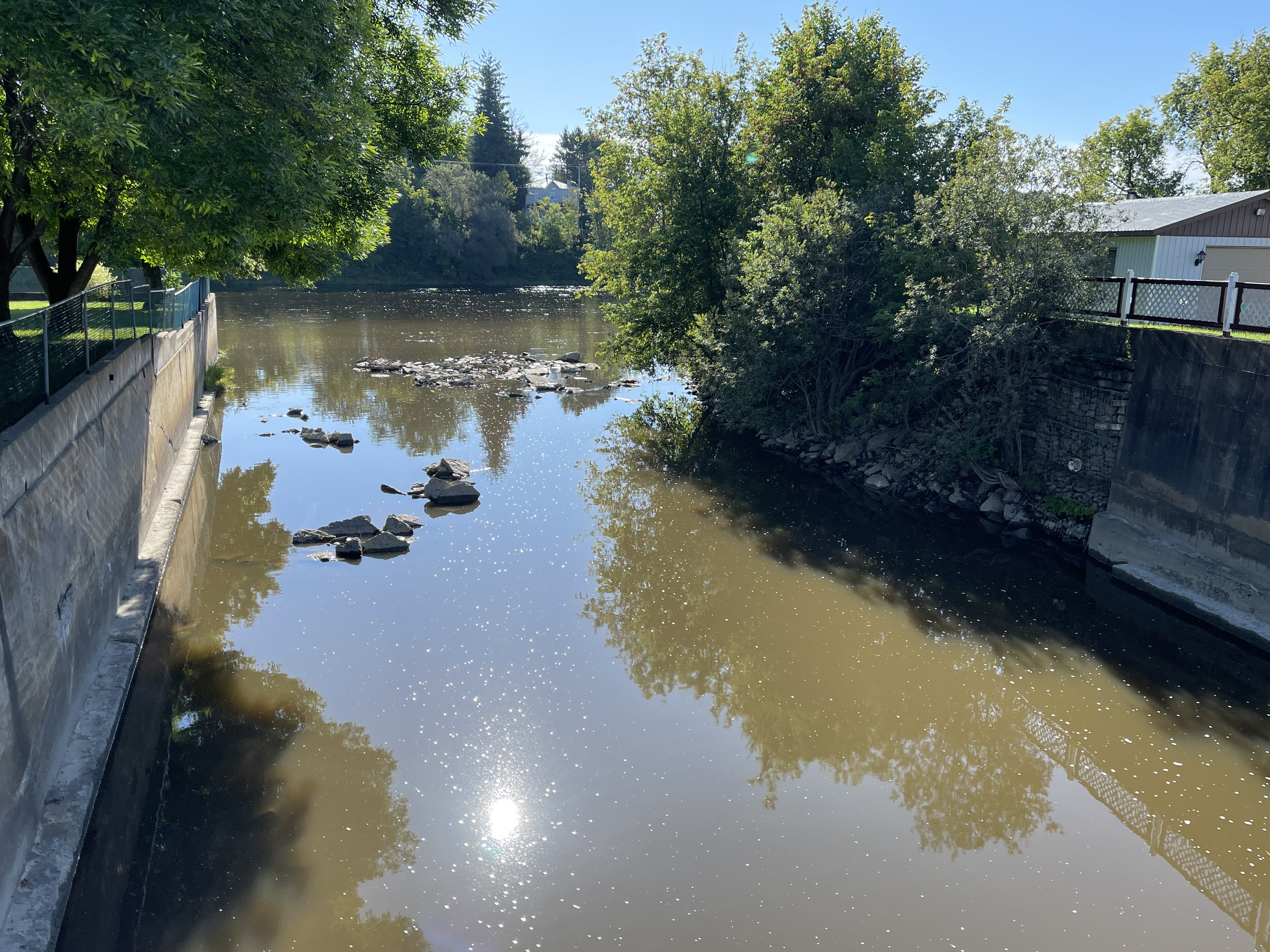
Confluence of Niagarette and Sainte-Anne rivers, rue Tessier, (Quebec Route 354)

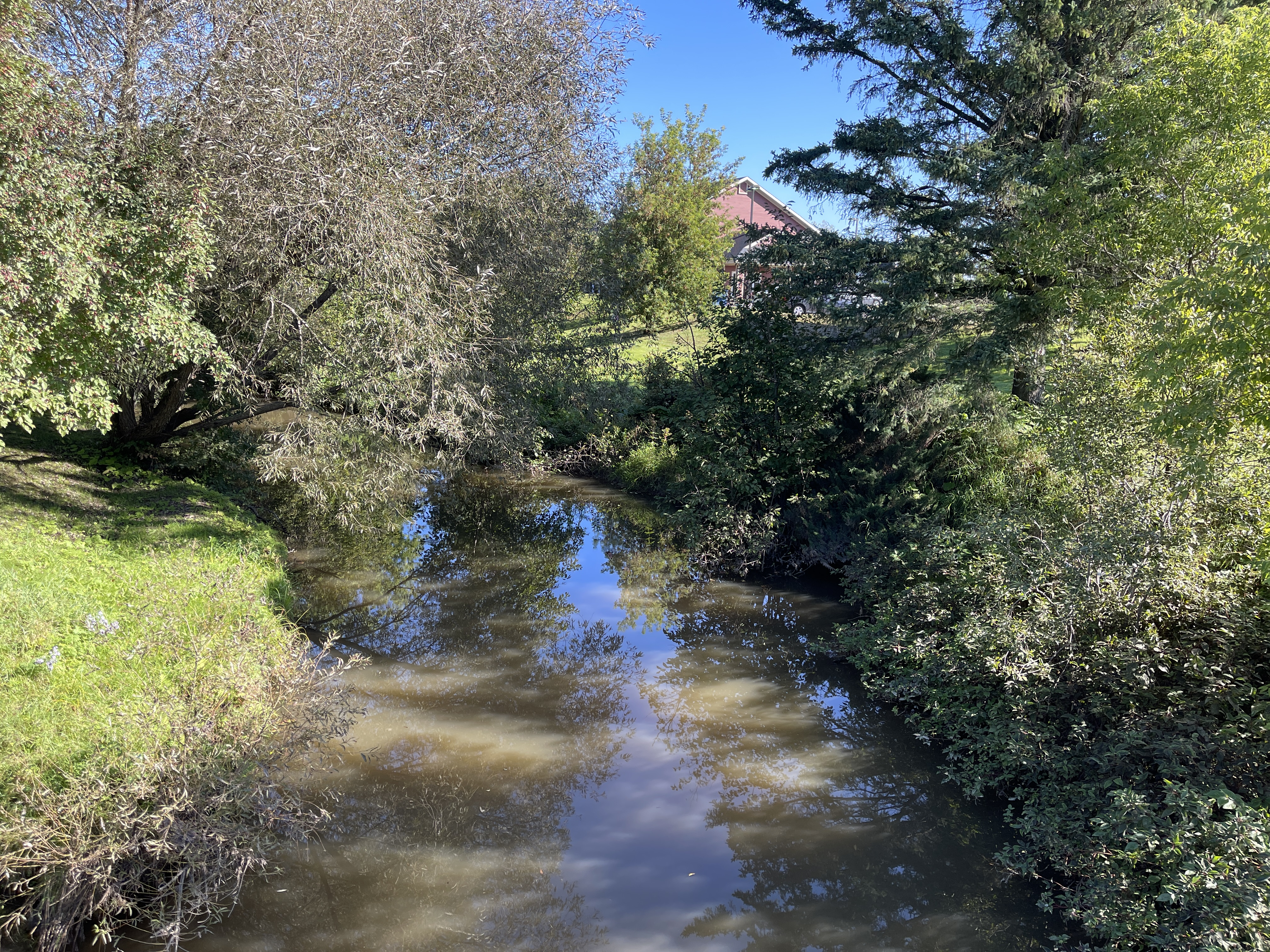
Mountain Boulevard (Quebec Route 363)

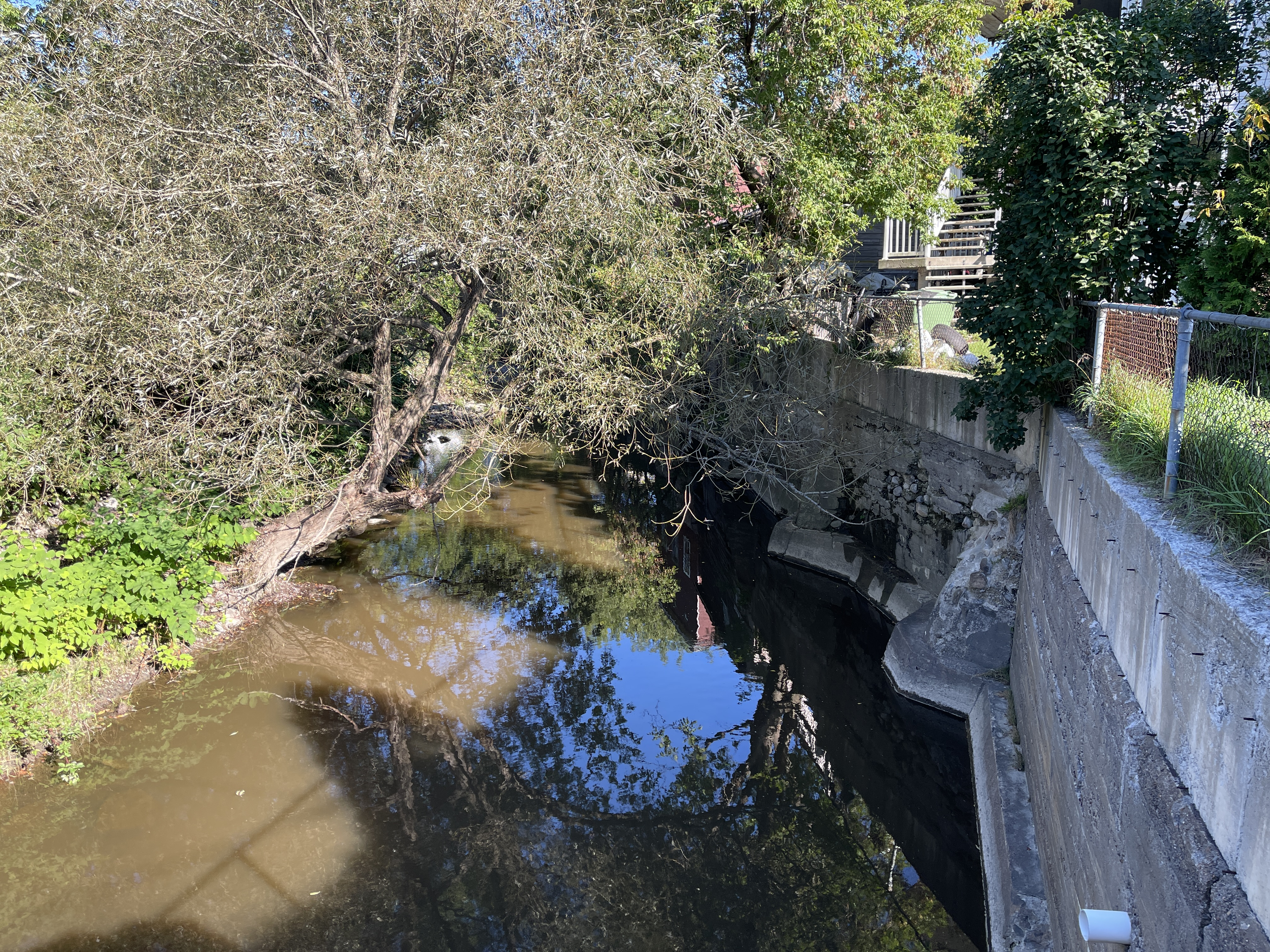
Godin Street from P-06074

The Niagarette river takes its source from a small unidentified lake (altitude of 138 metres (453 ft)), located in a forest area in the eastern part of the municipality of Saint-Ubalde. This lake is located 4.8 kilometres (3.0 mi) east of the village center of Saint-Ubalde and 10.8 kilometres (6.7 mi) northwest of the confluence of the Niagarette River and the Sainte-Anne River.

== Fauna ==
Fish species found in the Niagarette River

Dard barré - Épinoche à cinq épines - Lamproie de l'Est - Méné à museau arrondi - Méné à nageoires rouges - Méné bec-de-lièvre - Méné paille - Meunier noir - Mulet à cornes - Mulet perlé - Naseux des rapides - Omisco - Raseux-de-terre noirs - mulet perlé. Fish photos some with English translation:

The majority of fish species were sampled by the Corporation d'Aménagement et de Protection de la Sainte-Anne in 2002 (CAPSA).

== History ==
Two major floods have been reported in the history of the Niagarette River, in 1939 and in 1973, On August 10, 1939, the erosion of the banks of the Niagarette river had damaged the low walls of cement and the rip-rap of the banks near the buildings south of the village of Saint-Casimir. This sudden flood also damaged the route 363 and swept away the residences of the families of Réjean Lépine and Rolland Duchesneau, located near the course of the river as well as part of their respective terrain. The houses of MM. Victorin Naud and Lévis Tessier were also damaged.

On October 29, 1986, the Gazette officielle du Québec published decree 1512–86 at the request of the municipality of Saint-Casimir for the reconstruction of a dam for the purpose of aqueduct on the bed of the Niagarette river.

In 1998, the municipality of Saint-Casimir had a project to divert the Niagarette river by giving it a more rectilinear route in order to resolve its flooding problems. The Niagarette river then had a meander more than 200 meters long, suitable for the formation of ice jams during the snowmelt.

== Toponymy ==
The spelling of the toponym occasionally took the form "Naigarette River" dating back to the end of the 19th century and perhaps even before. This toponym could be explained as being a diminutive of the famous Niagara Falls. The term Iroquois niagara means "to resonate", "to make noise".

The toponym "Niagarette River" was formalized on August 17, 1978, at the Place Names Bank of the Commission de toponymie du Québec.

== See also ==
- Petite rivière Niagarette
- List of rivers of Quebec
