= Rivière des Pins (Blanc Lake) =

- Location within Quebec

Location
- Country: Canada
- Province: Quebec
- Region: Mauricie and Capitale-Nationale
- Regional County Municipality: Mékinac and Portneuf Regional County Municipality
- Municipalities: Notre-Dame-des-Anges and Saint-Ubalde

Physical characteristics
- Source: Lac de la Galette
  - location: Notre-Dame-des-Anges, MRC Mékinac
  - coordinates: 46°54′30″N 72°13′58″W
  - elevation: 207 m (679 ft)
- Mouth: Blanc Lake
  - location: Saint-Ubalde
  - coordinates: 46°49′43″N 72°16′10″W
  - elevation: 142 m (466 ft)
- Length: 11 km (6.8 mi)
- Discharge
  - location: Saint-Ubalde

Basin features
- Tributaries
  - left: (Upward from the mouth) Discharge from four small unidentified lakes, discharge from four small lakes including Lac du Domaine and Lac à Saint-Pierre, discharge (via Lac des Pins) from a small unidentified lake.
  - right: (Upward from the mouth) Discharge from an unidentified small lake, discharge from Goulet lake, unidentified stream, discharge (via Lac des Pins) from Lac à Matte, discharge (via Lac des Pins) from Lac Gervais, discharge from Lac du Canard, stream not identified.

The Rivière des Pins is a freshwater stream, in Quebec, in Canada. This river crosses the municipalities of:

- Notre-Dame-des-Anges in the Mékinac Regional County Municipality, in the administrative region of Mauricie;
- Saint-Ubalde, in the MRC of Portneuf Regional County Municipality, in the administrative region of Capitale-Nationale.

The White River flows mainly in agricultural and forest environments, being the main economic activities of this small valley.

The lower part of this valley is served by the Chemin du Lac-Blanc which surrounds Lac Blanc, and the Verrette road. The upper part is served by the paths around Lac des Pins (ch. du Lac-des-Pins, rue Carpentier, rue des Pins, rue Gingras) and the chemin du Lac-de-la-Galette and the chemin des Quatre Côtes.

The surface of the Blanche River (except the rapids areas) is generally frozen from the beginning of December to the end of March; however, safe circulation on the ice is generally from late December to early March. The water level of the river varies with the seasons and the precipitation; the spring flood occurs in March or April.

== Geography ==
The Blanche River has its source at Lac de la Galette (length: 0.8 kilometres (0.50 mi) in the shape of a T; altitude of 207 metres (679 ft)), in Notre-Dame-de-Montauban. This lake supplies two streams and the outlet of Lac à l'Équerre (altitude: 212 metres (696 ft)). This lake is mainly located in the forest area for the eastern part. Lac de la Galette has a few chalets on its west shore.

From the mouth of Lac de la Galette, the Pins river flows over 11 kilometres (6.8 mi) in the forest zone, with a drop of 65 metres (213 ft) according to the following segments:

- 3.4 kilometres (2.1 mi) southerly in a straight line, crossing an area of marshland including a small lake, collecting an unidentified stream (coming from the west) and the outlet (coming from the north- west) of Lac du Canard, and crossing on 0.7 kilometres (0.43 mi) Lac des Pins (length: 1.2 kilometres (0.75 mi); altitude: 184 metres (604 ft)) until at its mouth. Note: This lake is famous for vacationing because about 35 cottages are built there;
- 4.2 kilometres (2.6 mi) to the south by crossing the Lac-du-Castor road, then the Verrette road, to the outlet (coming from the east) from Lac to Saint-Pierre;
- 3.4 kilometres (2.1 mi) to the south by collecting the discharge (coming from the east) from four small unidentified lakes and the discharge (coming from the west) from some small unidentified lakes, up to the north shore of Blanc Lake.

From the mouth of the Pins River, the current flows on:

- 3.2 kilometres (2.0 mi) to the south by crossing Lac Blanc;
- 29.25 kilometres (18.18 mi) towards the south following the course of the Blanche River (Saint-Casimir);
- 18 kilometres (11 mi) southwards following the course of the Noire River (Sainte-Anne River);
- 11.5 kilometres (7.1 mi) southwards following the course of the Sainte-Anne River (Mauricie) to the northwest shore of the Saint-Laurent river.

== Toponymy ==
The toponym "Rivière des Pins" (Notre-Dame-des-Anges and Saint-Ubalde) was formalized on May 7, 1981, at the Place Names Bank of the Commission de toponymie du Québec.

== See also ==
- List of rivers of Quebec

== Bibliography ==
- CAPSA (2014). Plans directeurs de l’eau des secteurs d’intervention de la zone de gestion de la CAPSA: Sainte-Anne, Portneuf et La Chevrotière (Water master plans of the intervention sectors of the CAPSA management area: Sainte-Anne, Portneuf and La Chevrotière) (PDF) (in French). Quebec: CAPSA. p. 691. Archived from the original (PDF) on 2019-02-14.
