= Petite rivière Niagarette =

- Location within Quebec

Location
- Country: Canada
- Province: Quebec
- Region administrative: Capitale-Nationale, Mauricie
- Regional County Municipality: Portneuf Regional County Municipality
- Municipalities: Saint-Thuribe, Saint-Casimir

Physical characteristics
- Source: Confluence of two forest streams
  - location: Saint-Thuribe, MRC Portneuf Regional County Municipality
  - coordinates: 46°42′41″N 72°14′06″W
  - elevation: 138 m (453 ft)
- Mouth: Niagarette River
  - location: Saint-Casimir
  - coordinates: 46°39′33″N 72°08′49″W
  - elevation: 32 m (105 ft)
- Length: 12.1 km (7.5 mi)
- Discharge
  - location: Saint-Casimir

Basin features
- Tributaries
  - left: (Upward from the mouth) Ruisseau Genest, ruisseau Martin.

The Petite rivière Niagarette (English: Little Niagarette River) is a tributary of the Niagarette River, crossing the municipalities of Saint-Thuribe and Saint-Casimir, in the Portneuf Regional County Municipality, in the administrative region of Capitale-Nationale, in Quebec, in Canada.

The course of the Petite rivière Niagarette descends first on 3.3 kilometres (2.1 mi) in the forest zone, then entirely in the agricultural environment; thus, forestry and agriculture are the main economic activities in this small valley.

The surface of the Petite Niagarette River (except the rapids zones) is generally frozen from the beginning of December to the end of March, but the safe circulation on the ice is generally made from the end of December to the beginning of March.

== Geography ==
The Little Niagarette River rises at an altitude of 138 metres (453 ft), at the confluence of two streams, on the west side of "La Montagne" in Saint-Thuribe where a ski center is set up. This source is located in a forest area at:

- 1.2 kilometres (0.75 mi) west of the summit of "La Montagne";
- 5.4 kilometres (3.4 mi) southwest of the center of the village of Saint-Thuribe;
- 5.5 kilometres (3.4 mi) south-east of the village center of Saint-Ubalde;
- 9.0 kilometres (5.6 mi) north-west of the confluence of the Petite Rivière Niagarette and the Niagarette River.

From its source, the course of the Little Niagarette River flows over 12.1 kilometres (7.5 mi) with a drop of 106 metres (348 ft) according to these segments:

- 3.3 kilometres (2.1 mi) generally south-east on the west side of "La Montagne" up to the limit between the forest area and the agricultural area;
- 5.9 kilometres (3.7 mi) eastwards in the agricultural area, up to the railway bridge;
- 2.9 kilometres (1.8 mi) to the east in an agricultural zone by crossing route 363 (boulevard de la Montagne), forming a hook towards the south, to its mouth.

The Little Niagarette River flows on the west bank of the Niagarette River, on the west side of the center of the village of Saint-Casimir.

== History ==
Two major floods have been reported in the history of the Niagarette River and the Little Niagarette River, in 1939 and in 1973. The waters of the Little Niagarette River rose by almost 4 meters during the night of September 5 to 6, 1973, following a 6 cm rain accumulation.

== Toponymy ==
The toponyms "Little Niagarette River" and "Niagarette River" are linked.

The toponym "Petite rivière Niagarette" was formalized on August 17, 1978, at the Place Names Bank of the Commission de toponymie du Québec.

== See also ==
- List of rivers of Quebec

== Bibliography ==
- CAPSA (2014). Water master plans of the intervention sectors of the CAPSA management area: Sainte-Anne, Portneuf and La Chevrotière (PDF) (in French). Quebec: CAPSA. p. 691. Archived from the original (PDF) on 2019-02-14.
