= Carillon Lake (Saint-Ubalde) =

Lake in Saint-Ubalde, Quebec, Canada

- Location in Quebec
- Location: Notre-Dame-de-Montauban and Saint-Ubalde, Portneuf Regional County Municipality, Capitale-Nationale, Quebec, Canada
- Coordinates: 46.84666°N 72.20389°W
- Lake type: Natural
- Primary inflows: Six small forest streams
- Primary outflows: Weller River
- Basin countries: Canada
- Max. length: 2.8 km (1.7 mi)
- Max. width: 1.8 km (1.1 mi)
- Surface elevation: 219 m (719 ft)

Lac Carillon

The lac Carillon is located on the north shore of the St. Lawrence River, in the province of Quebec, in Canada. This lake straddles the municipalities of:

- Notre-Dame-de-Montauban part of the MRC Mékinac, in the administrative region of Mauricie;
- Saint-Ubalde part of the MRC of Portneuf Regional County Municipality, in the administrative region of Capitale-Nationale.

The lake area is served by Chemin des Ballades; the northwest part of the lake is served by "Enchantée" and "des Mélodies" streets; the southwest part, by the Lac-Carillon path and the Bernache path.

Forestry is the main economic activity in the sector; recreational tourism, second. This lake surrounded by forest is integrated into the Portneuf Regional Natural Park, except the zone forming part of Notre-Dame-de-Montauban.

The surface of Carillon Lake is usually frozen from the beginning of December to the end of March, however the safe circulation on the ice is generally made from mid-December to mid-March.

== Geography ==
With a length of 2.8 kilometres (1.7 mi) and a maximum width of 1.9 kilometres (1.2 mi), Carillon Lake has five islands. Deformed in nature, this lake has three parts:

- western part: with a length of 0.8 kilometres (0.50 mi), this part is separated from the central part by two facing peninsulas and by an island (length: 0.35 kilometres (0.22 mi)) between the two peninsulas; thus, two small straits allow pleasure craft to connect the central part of the lake;
- central part: of a length: 1.8 kilometres (1.1 mi), this part comprises three islands and is attached to a peninsula attached to the south shore, stretching over 0.8 kilometres (0.50 mi) north and separating the eastern and central part of the lake;
- eastern part: the eastern part has a length of 1.9 kilometres (1.2 mi) in the north–south direction.

Lac Carillon is located 0.4 kilometres (0.25 mi) southwest of Montauban Lake. The mouth of Carillon Lake is located at the bottom of a small bay on the southeast shore of the lake at:

- 4.6 kilometres (2.9 mi) north-east of Blanc Lake;
- 2.8 kilometres (1.7 mi) north-east of Emerald Lake;
- 2.5 kilometres (1.6 mi) northwest of Sept Îles Lake;
- 3.3 kilometres (2.1 mi) southwest of Long Lake;
- 10.5 kilometres (6.5 mi) north of the village center of Saint-Ubalde.

Comprising 70 kilometres (43.50 mi), the Portneuf Regional Natural Park includes in particular the Long lakes, Montauban, Carillon, Sept Îles, Lac en Coeur, "À l'Anguille" and some other more secondary bodies of water. This park is popular for recreational and tourist activities: hiking trails, cross-country skiing, boat launching ramp ...

From the mouth of Carillon Lake, the current flows over:

- 16.7 kilometres (10.4 mi) to the east, then to the south in particular by crossing Sept Îles Lake, following the course of the Weller River;
- 18.1 kilometres (11.2 mi) south and southeast by the Blanche River;
- 1.8 kilometres (1.1 mi) to the south by the Noire River;
- 11.5 kilometres (7.1 mi) towards the south by the Sainte-Anne River which flows on the northwest bank of the Saint-Laurent river.

== Toponymy ==
The toponym "Lac Carillon" (Portneuf) was registered on December 5, 1968, in the Place Names Bank of the Commission de toponymie du Québec.

== See also ==
- Portneuf Regional County Municipality (MRC)
- Notre-Dame-de-Montauban
- Saint-Ubalde
- Portneuf Regional Natural Park
- Weller River
- Sept Îles Lake
