= Sept Îles Lake (Saint-Ubalde) =

Body of water in Quebec, Canada

- Location in Quebec
- Location: Saint-Ubalde and Saint-Alban, Portneuf Regional County Municipality, Capitale-Nationale, Capitale-Nationale, Quebec, Canada
- Coordinates: 46.8125°N 72.17889°W
- Lake type: Natural
- Primary inflows: Carillon Lake
- Primary outflows: Weller River
- Basin countries: Canada
- Max. length: 2.0 km (1.2 mi)
- Max. width: 0.75 km (0.47 mi)
- Surface elevation: 149 m (489 ft)
- Islands: 7

Lac Sept Îles is a freshwater body straddling the municipalities of Saint-Ubalde and Saint-Alban, in the Portneuf Regional County Municipality, in the administrative region of Capitale-Nationale, in the province of Quebec, Canada.

Lake Sept Îles is located entirely in the forest. From the nineteenth century, forestry has been the predominant economic activity. In the twentieth century, recreational tourism activities were highlighted. The lake surface is normally frozen from November to April. However, the period of safe circulation on the ice is usually from mid-December to the end of March.

== Geography ==
"Sept Îles Lake" is located 2.3 km southwest of Long Lake, 2.1 km south of Montauban Lake, 2.4 km south of Carillon Lake, 2.5 km east of Emerald Lake and 1.5 km north of Lac en Coeur.

The "Lac Sept Îles" supplies itself from Lac Carillon, located northwest, whose discharge of 3.5 km flows to the southeast, then to the south. This last lake drinks six small streams. A 360 m strip of land separates it with a bay on the west shore of Lac Montauban. The area north of Sept Îles Lake is marshy.

The mouth of Lac Sept Îles is located at the bottom of a bay in the far west. The lake flows into the Weller River which flows a priori for 3.2 km towards the southwest until the outlet of a small lake located upstream. Then, this river flows for one kilometer south to Lake Weller (length: 0.84 km oriented southwest) whose shape resembles a drum stick. The current crosses it almost over its full length. Then this river generally flows in an agricultural area to the south-east, then south to the Blanche River.

== Toponymy ==
The toponym "Lac Sept Îles" was formalized on December 5, 1968, at the Place Names Bank of the Commission de toponymie du Québec.
