= Emerald Lake =

Emerald Lake may refer to:

- Emerald Lake (British Columbia), Canada
- Emerald Lake (Yukon), Canada
- Emerald Lake (Saskatchewan), Canada
- Emerald Lake (Ooty), India

== United States ==
=== California ===
- Emerald Lake (Lassen Peak), a lake in Shasta County near Lassen Peak
- Emerald Lake (Trinity County, California), a lake in the Trinity Alps of Trinity County
- Emerald Lake Hills, California, a census-designated place in San Mateo County
- Emerald Lake (Mono County, California), a lake near Mammoth Lakes, California

=== Montana ===
- Emerald Lake in Deer Lodge County, Montana
- Emerald Lake in Gallatin County, Montana
- Emerald Lake in Pondera County, Montana
- Emerald Lake in Silver Bow County, Montana
- Emerald Lake in Stillwater County, Montana
- Emerald Lake in Sweet Grass County, Montana

=== Other states ===
- Emerald Lake (Rocky Mountain National Park), a lake near Hallett Peak in Rocky Mountain National Park
- Emerald Lake (San Juan National Forest), a lake in the Weminuche Wilderness
- Emerald Lake (Idaho)
- Emerald Lake in Elko County, Nevada
- Emerald Lake Village, in Hillsborough, New Hampshire
- Emerald Lake (Mount Timpanogos Wilderness) a lake in Utah County, Utah
- Emerald Lake State Park, Vermont

== See also ==
- Lake Emerald (disambiguation)
- Lake Treganowan in Emerald, Victoria, Australia
- Emeraude Lake, Quebec, Canada
- Emerald Lakes, Pennsylvania
- Emerald Lakes, New Zealand
