= Lake Emerald =

Lake Emerald may refer to:

- Emerald Lake (disambiguation)
- Somatochlora cingulata, the Lake Emerald, a North American dragonfly
