= Weller River =

Weller River (Stream)
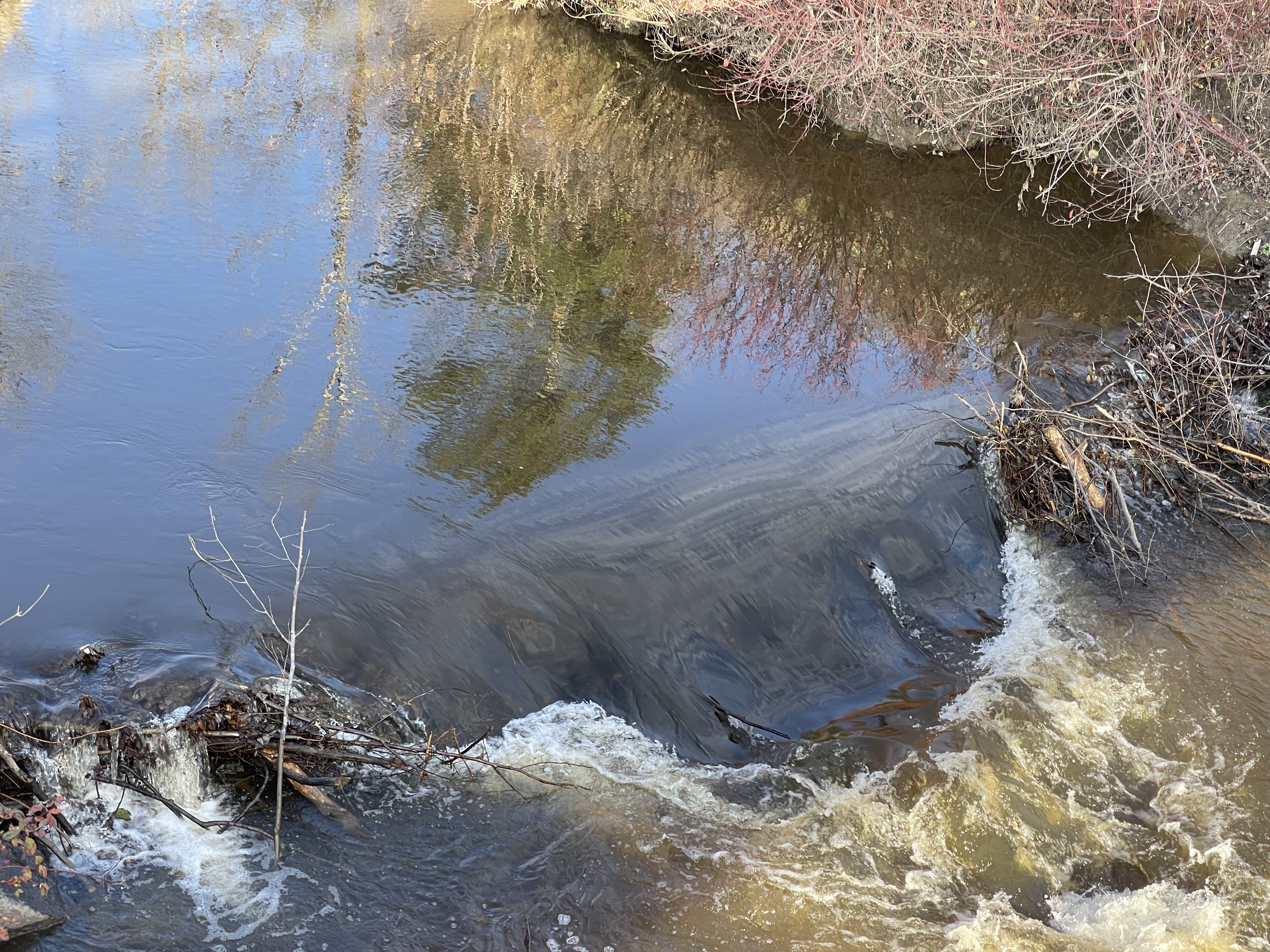
- Rang St-Joseph, Saint-Ubalde

- Location within Quebec

Location
- Country: Canada
- Province: Quebec
- Region: Capitale-Nationale, Mauricie
- Regional County Municipality: Portneuf Regional County Municipality
- Municipalities: Saint-Ubalde

Physical characteristics
- Source: Lac Carillon
  - location: Saint-Ubalde, MRC Portneuf Regional County Municipality
  - coordinates: 46°50′10″N 72°11′46″W
  - elevation: 219 m (719 ft)
- Mouth: Blanche River
  - location: Saint-Ubalde
  - coordinates: 46°45′22″N 72°13′05″W
  - elevation: 146 m (479 ft)
- Length: 16.7 km (10.4 mi)
- Discharge
  - location: Saint-Ubalde

Basin features
- Tributaries
  - left: (Upward from the mouth) Décharge des lacs aux Guêpes, à l'Anguille et en Coeur, décharge d'un ensemble de petits lacs.
  - right: (Upward from the mouth) Décharge du Grand lac à Désalliers, décharge de deux lacs non identifiés.

The Weller River (Stream) is a tributary left bank of the Blanche River (St-Casimir) whose confluence is found east of the municipality of Saint-Ubalde, in the Portneuf Regional County Municipality, in the administrative region of Capitale-Nationale, in the province of Quebec in Canada.

Forestry is the main economic activity in the upper part of this hydrographic slope; agriculture, in the lower part.

== Geography ==
The Weller River rises at Lac Carillon (length: 3.3 kilometres (2.1 mi); altitude: 219 metres (719 ft)) which straddles the boundary of the municipalities of Saint-Ubalde (Quebec) and Notre-Dame-de-Montauban. The resort developed in certain segments of the northwest and southwest shores of the lake because of Enchanted Street (north shore) and Chemin des Ballades (southwest shore). The mouth of the lake is located at the bottom of a small bay southwest of the lake.

== Toponymy ==
The term "Weller" is a surname of German origin.

The toponym "Rivière Weller" was registered with the Place names bank of the Commission de toponymie du Québec on May 5, 1981.

== See also ==
- Blanche River (Saint-Casimir)
- Noire River (Sainte-Anne River)
- Saint-Ubalde
- Lac Sept-Îles (Saint-Ubalde)
- Portneuf Regional County Municipality
- List of rivers of Quebec

== Photos ==
Weller River (Stream) in St-Ubalde

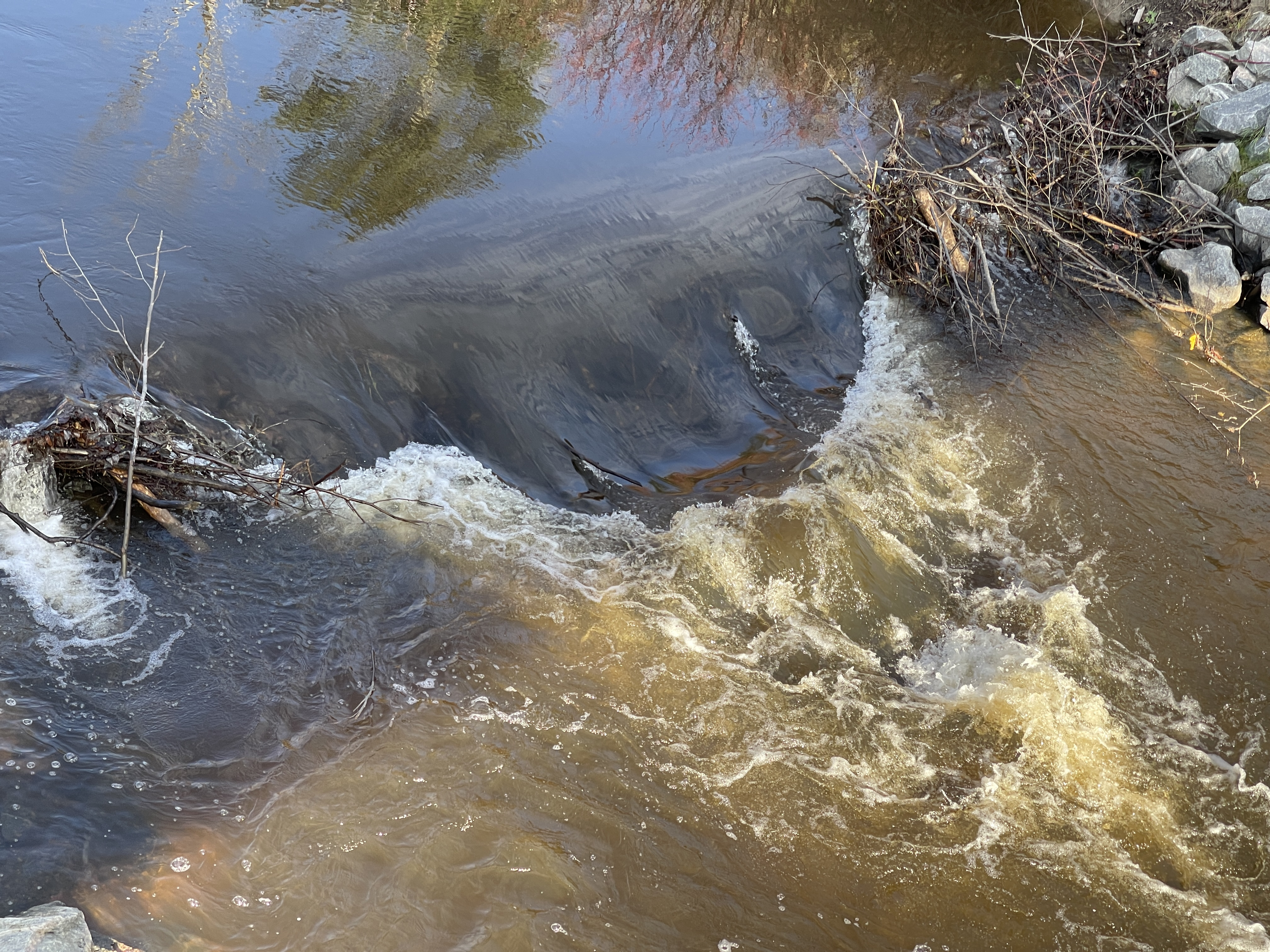
From Steel and wood bridge P-19613, rang Saint-Joseph

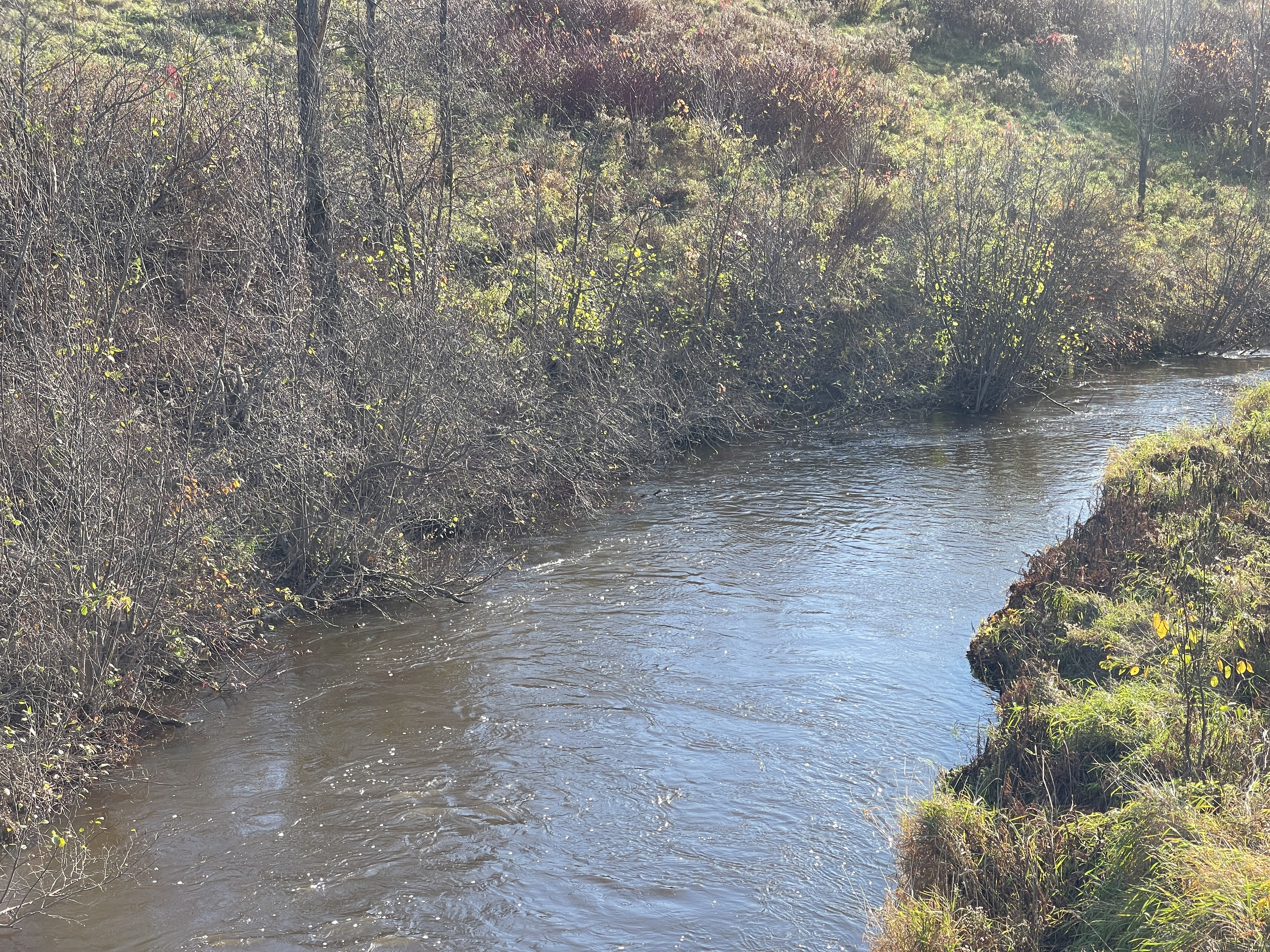
From Steel and wood bridge P-19613, rang Saint-Joseph

== Bibliography ==
- Sainte-Anne Development and Protection Corporation (2006). Sainte-Anne River Watershed Water Master Plan (PDF). p. 92.
