= Saint-Thuribe, Quebec =

Saint-Thuribe
- Parish municipality
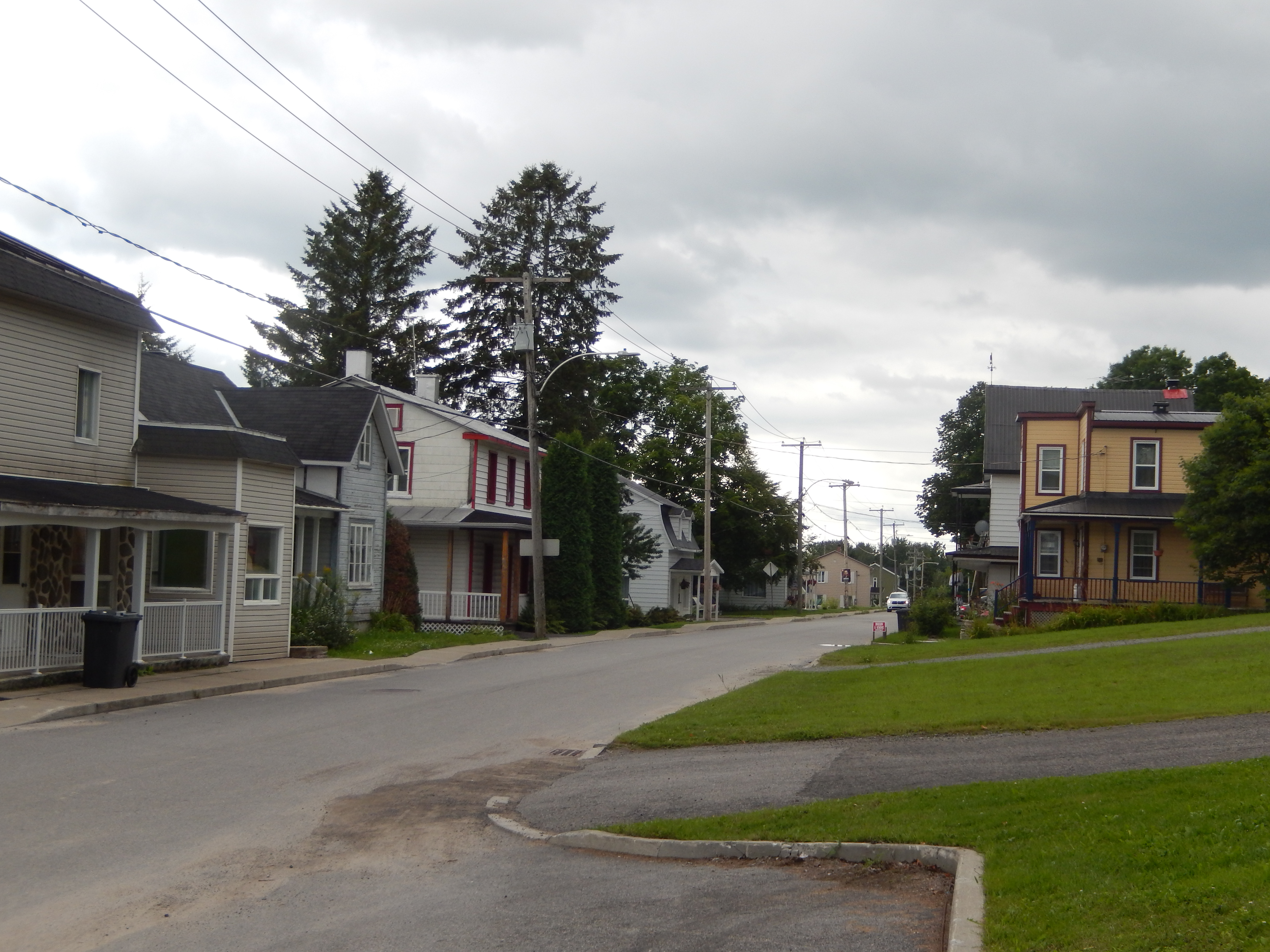

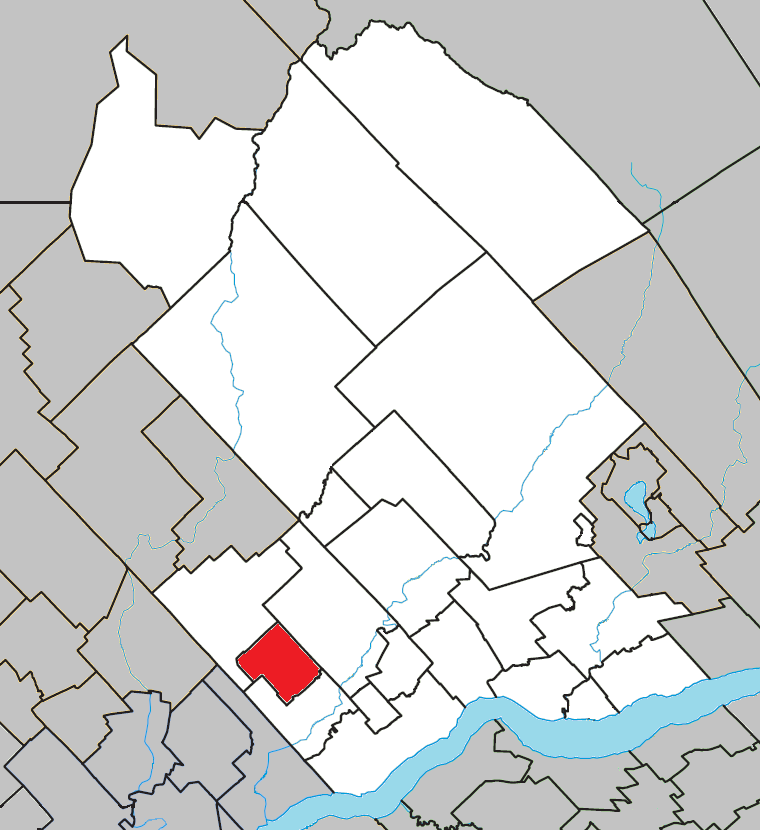
- Location within Portneuf RCM

- Location in central Quebec
- Coordinates: 46°43′N 72°10′W
- Country: Canada
- Province: Quebec
- Region: Capitale-Nationale
- RCM: Portneuf
- Constituted: February 14, 1898

Government
  - Mayor: Jacques Delisle
  - Fed. riding: Saint-Augustin—Portneuf—Jacques-Cartier
  - Prov. riding: Portneuf

Area
  - Total: 51.12 km^{2} (19.74 sq mi)
  - Land: 51.00 km^{2} (19.69 sq mi)

Population (2021)
  - Total: 298
  - Density: 5.8/km^{2} (15/sq mi)
  - Pop (2016-21): ▲4.2%
  - Dwellings: 158
- Time zone: UTC−5 (EST)
  - Summer (DST): UTC−4 (EDT)
- Postal code(s): G0A 4H0
- Area codes: 418, 581
- Highways: No major routes
- Website: www.st-thuribe.net

Saint-Thuribe (French pronunciation: [sɛ̃ tyʁib]) is a parish municipality in the Capitale-Nationale region of Quebec, Canada.

== History ==
In 1897, the Parish of Saint-Thuribe was formed, detached from Saint-Casimir, and named in honour of Turibius of Mogrovejo. The following year, the Parish Municipality of Saint-Thuribe was created and the post office opened, originally with the name Saint-Thuribe-de-Grandbois.

== Demographics ==
In the 2021 Census of Population conducted by Statistics Canada, Saint-Thuribe had a population of 298 living in 133 of its 158 total private dwellings, a change of 4.2% from its 2016 population of 286. With a land area of 51 km^{2} (20 sq mi), it had a population density of 5.8/km^{2} (15.1/sq mi) in 2021.

Historical census populations – Saint-Thuribe, Quebec

Year	Pop.	±%
1901	606	—
1911	642	+5.9%
1921	713	+11.1%
1931	744	+4.3%
1941	771	+3.6%
1951	746	−3.2%
1956	705	−5.5%

Year	Pop.	±%
1961	645	−8.5%
1966	604	−6.4%
1971	510	−15.6%
1976	463	−9.2%
1981	410	−11.4%
1986	404	−1.5%
1991	410	+1.5%

Year	Pop.	±%
1996	360	−12.2%
2001	313	−13.1%
2006	303	−3.2%
2011	288	−5.0%
2016	286	−0.7%
2021	298	+4.2%

Source: Statistics Canada

Mother tongue (2021):

- English as first language: 1.7%
- French as first language: 96.7%
- English and French as first languages: 0%
- Other as first language: 1.7%

== See also ==
- Blanche River
