= Blanche River (Saint-Casimir) =

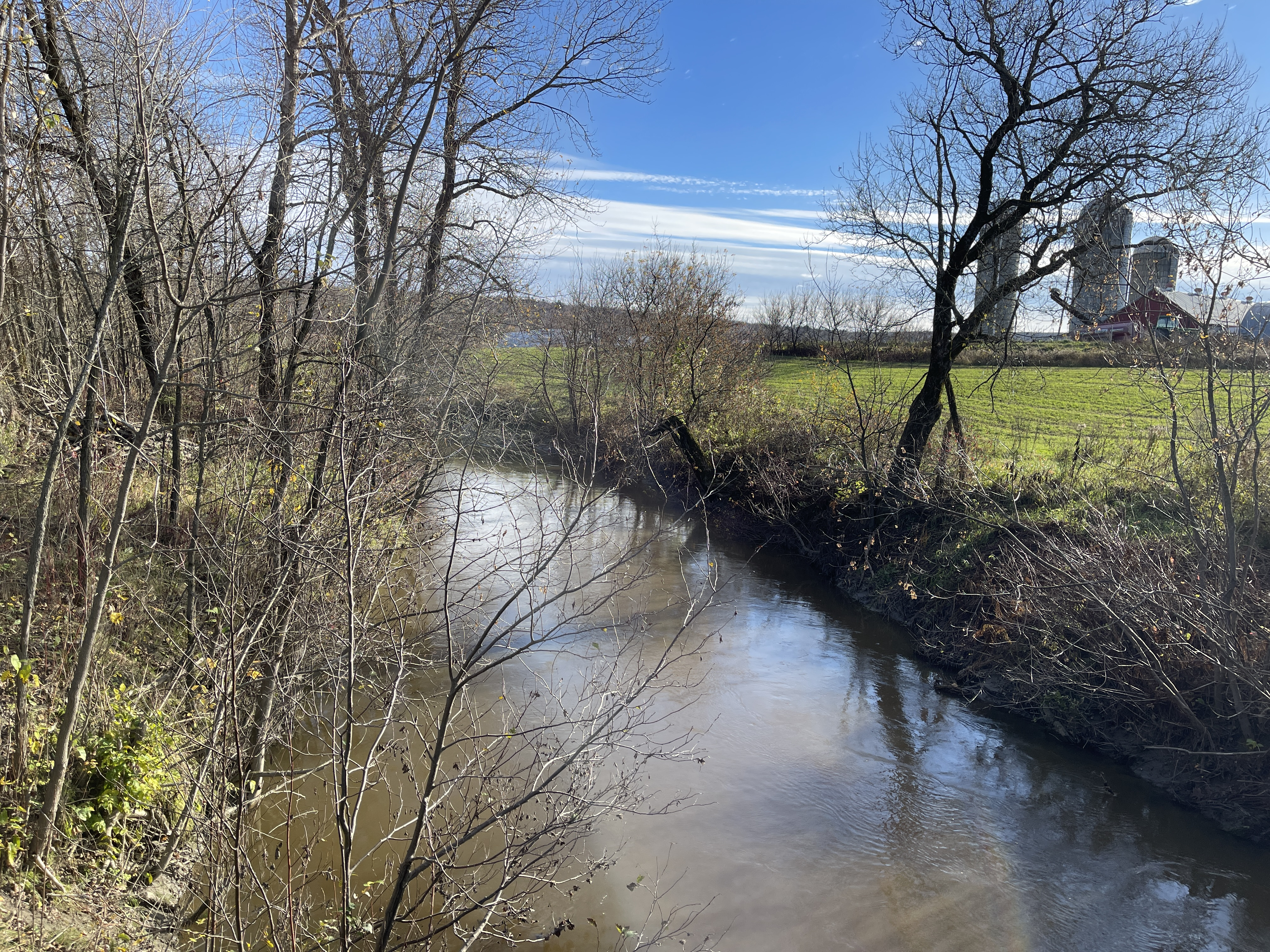
- Rang St-Georges, Saint-Ubalde

- Location within Quebec
- Native name: Rivière Blanche (French) Saint-Ubalde

Location
- Country: Canada
- Province: Quebec
- Region: Capitale-Nationale, Mauricie
- Municipalities: Saint-Ubalde, Saint-Alban, Saint-Casimir

Physical characteristics
- Source
  - coordinates: 46°40′25″N 72°07′52″W
- Mouth: Noire River
  - location: Saint-Casimir

The Blanche River (French: rivière Blanche, pronounced [ʁivjɛʁ blɑ̃ʃ], lit. 'White River') is a stream flowing in the municipalities of Saint-Ubalde, Saint-Thuribe, Saint-Alban and Saint-Casimir, in Portneuf RCM, Capitale-Nationale, Quebec, Canada.

The White River flows mainly in an agricultural environment, while passing near the villages of Saint-Ubalde and Saint-Casimir.

== Geography ==
An undulating plain marks the region of Saint-Casimir (Quebec). This clayey plain is carved out by the Sainte-Anne River and its tributaries, including the Blanche River.

The Blanche River meanders towards the Sainte-Anne River. To the south, the hills are gneissic rocks (Clark and Globensky 1975: 10) belonging to the Laurentian highlands called the “Petite Laurentides of Batiscan”.

Note: Based on a structure number, the Ministry of Transport and Sustainable Mobility of Quebec, under the Inventory and inspection of structures tab, offers a tool that gives a detailed description of the condition of all bridges, culverts, retaining walls and tunnels under the management of the Ministry, by region, road, network. On bridges, numbers are usually found on the bridge. (French)

Blanche River (Saint-Casimir).overview

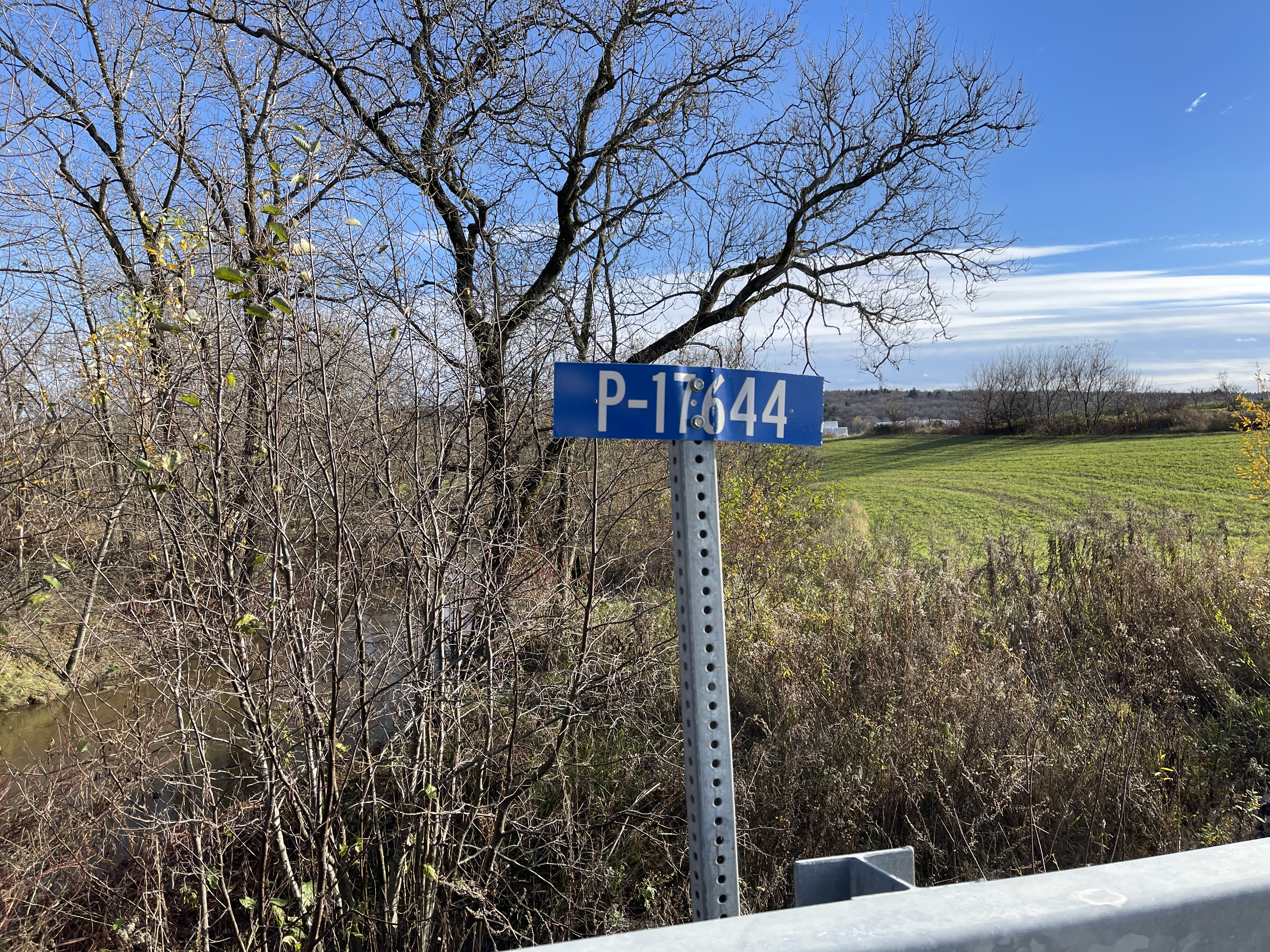
P-17644, reinforced concrete gantry structure, rang Saint-Georges, Saint-Ubalde

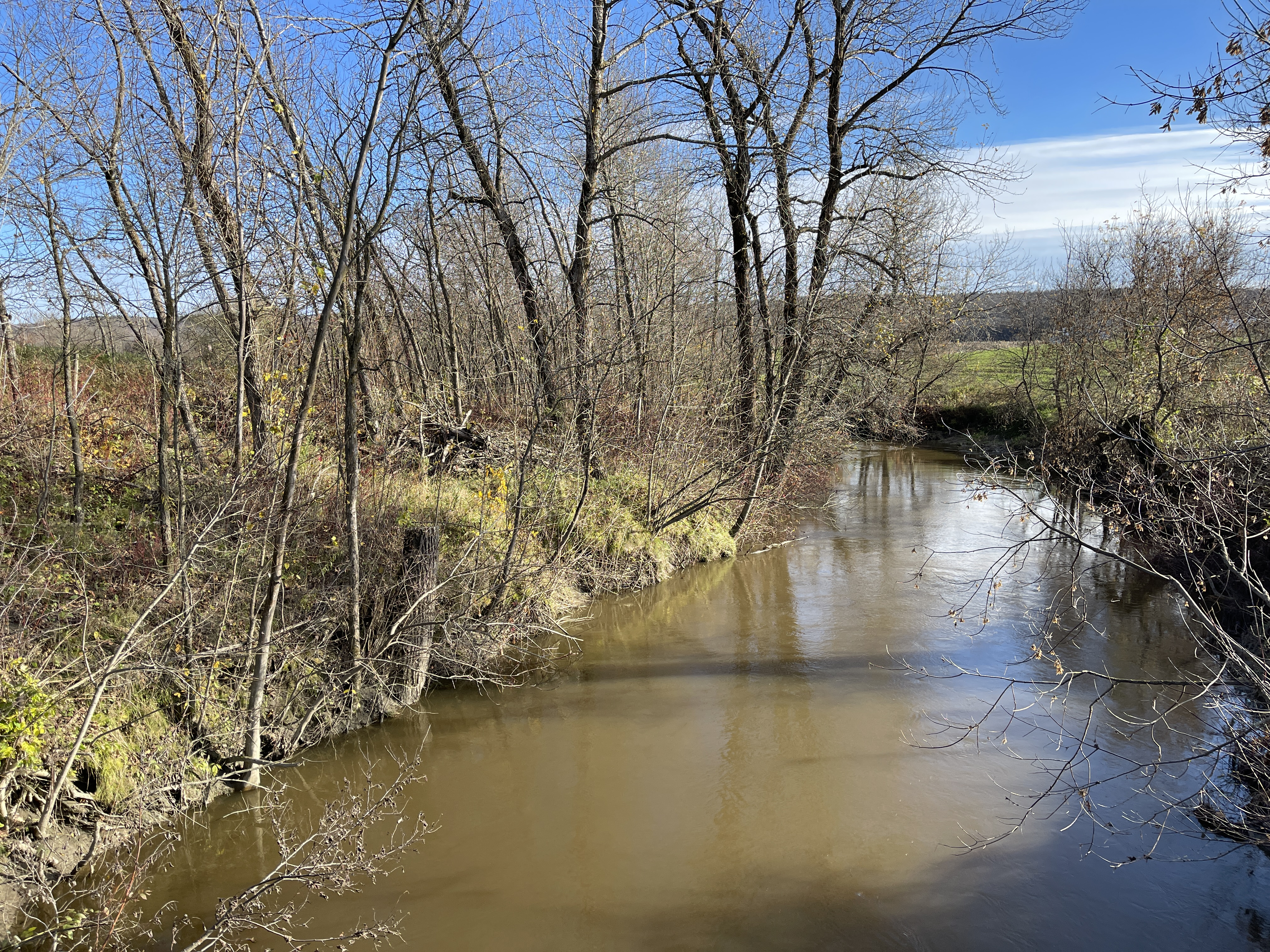
Rang Saint-Georges, Saint-Ubalde

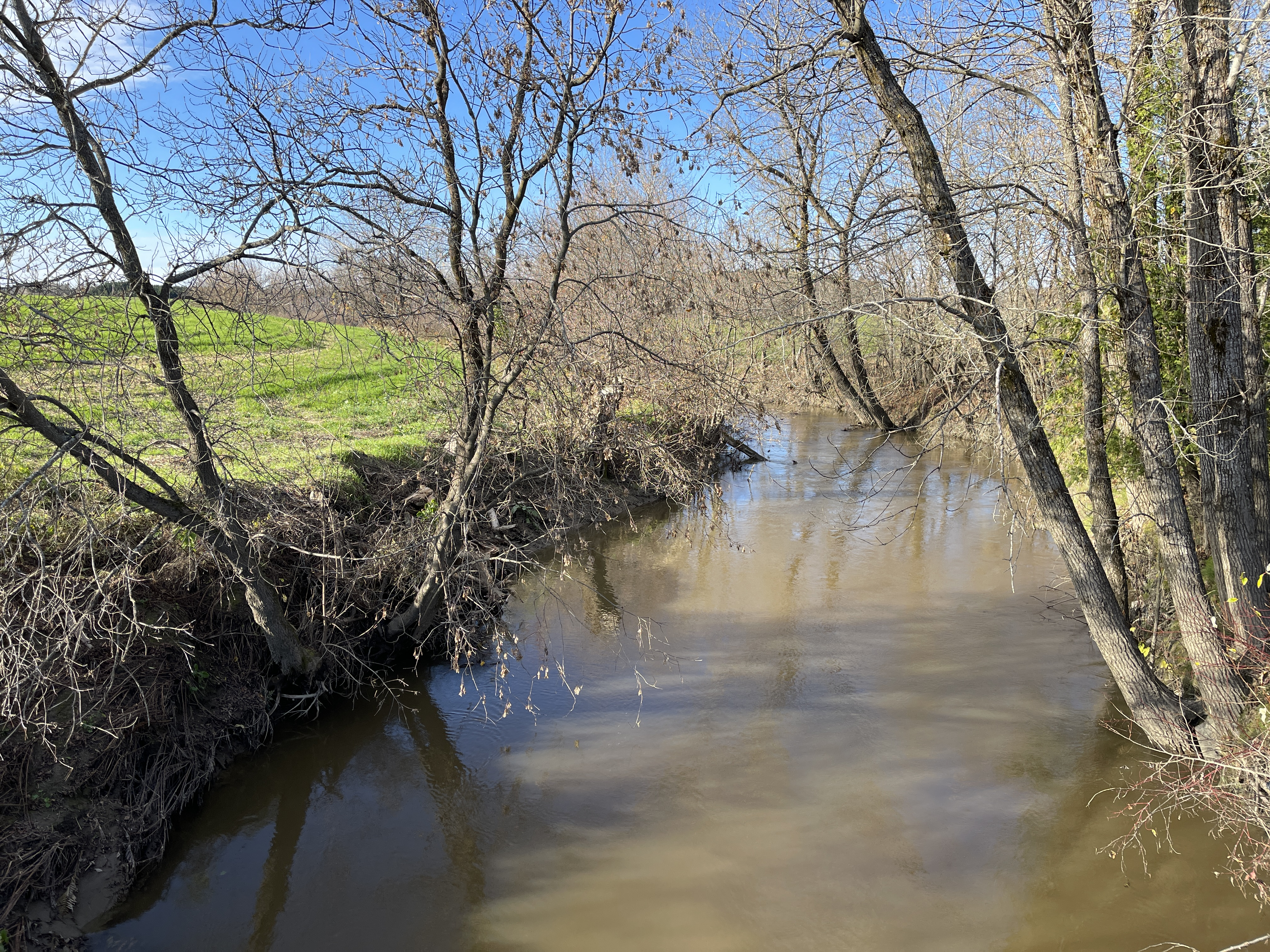
Rang Saint-Georges, Saint-Ubalde

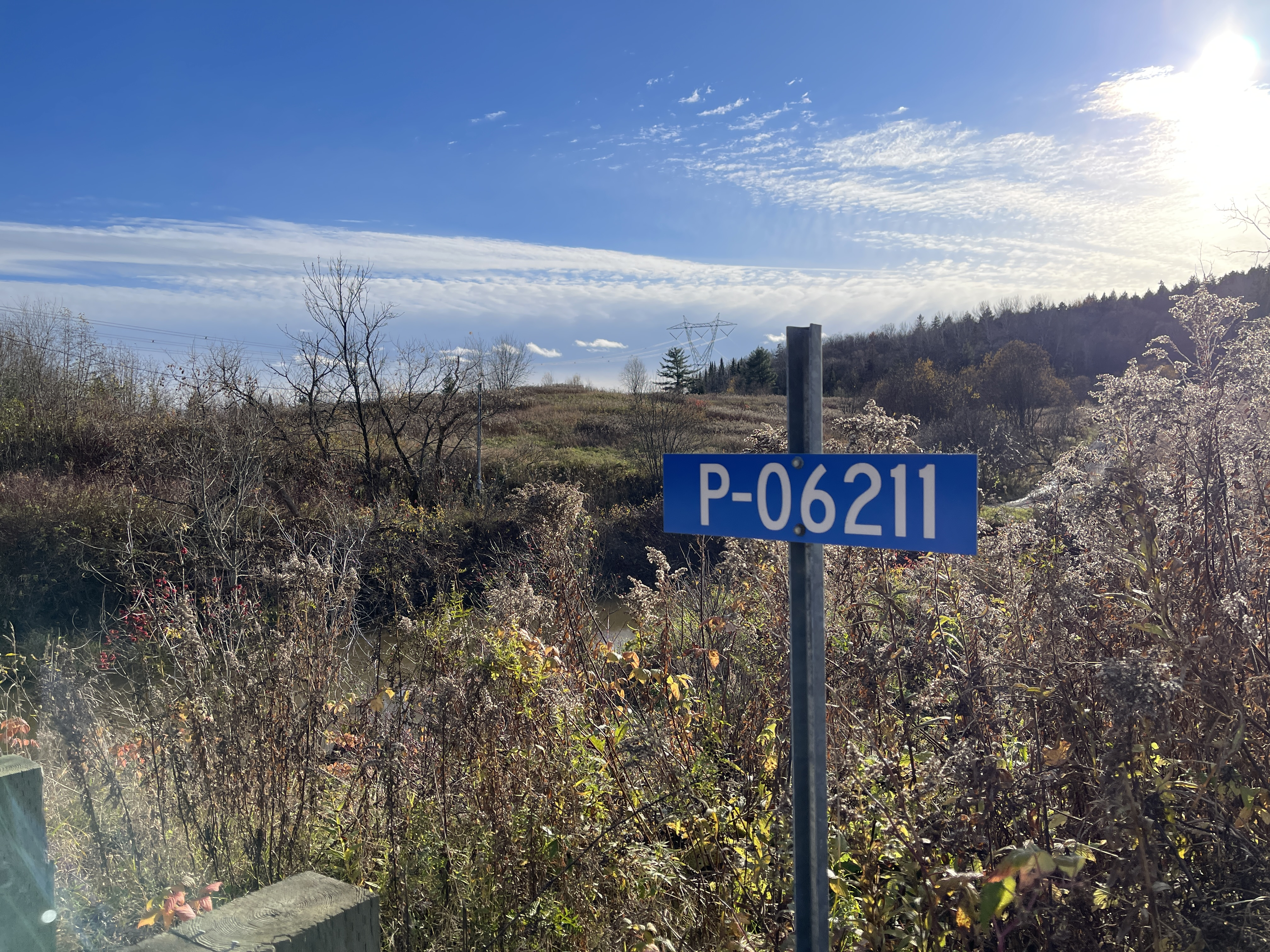
P-06211, steel-wood structure, rang Saint-Joseph, Saint-Thuribe (Québec)

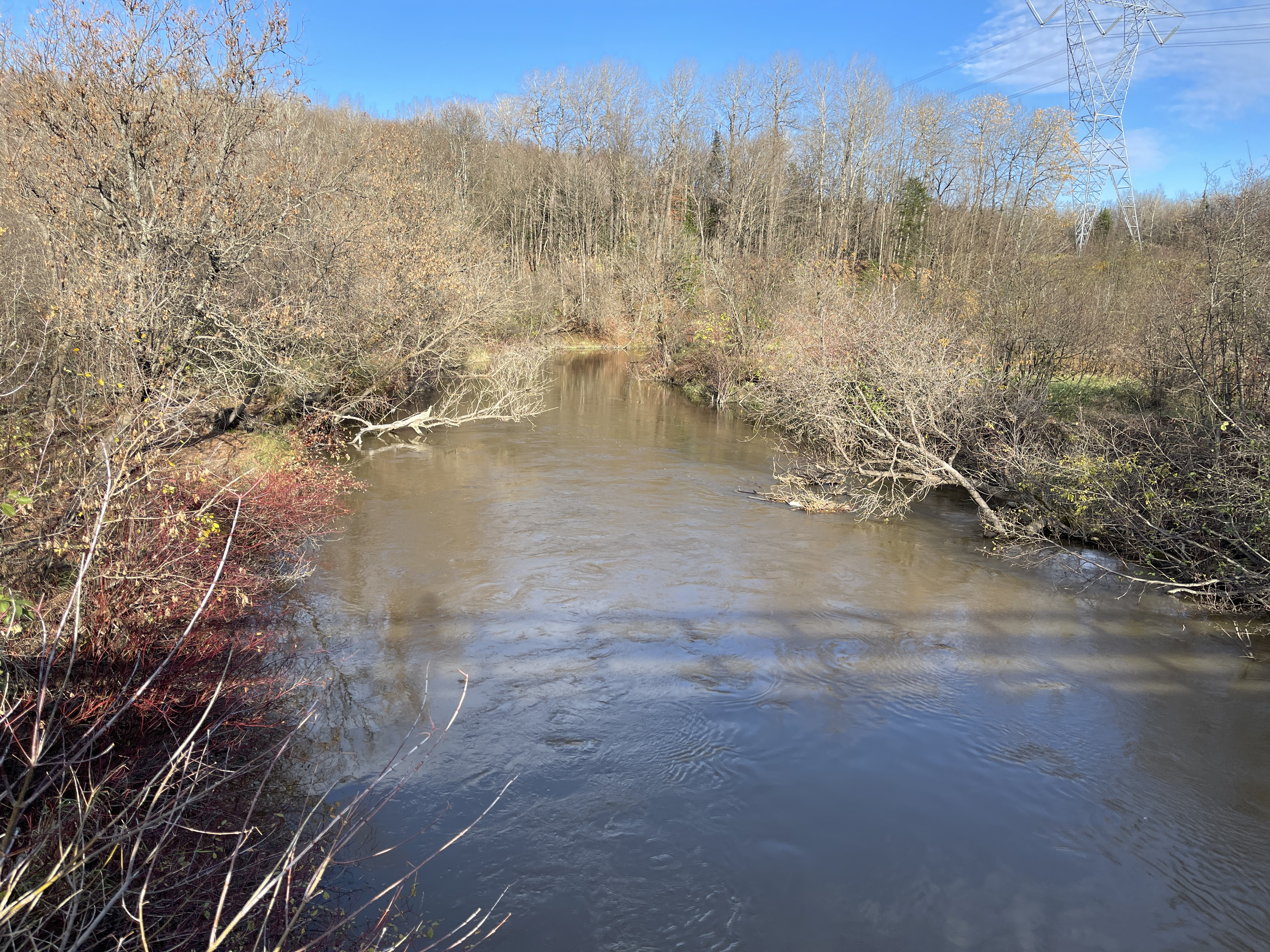
Rang Saint-Joseph, Saint-Thuribe (Québec)
Overview

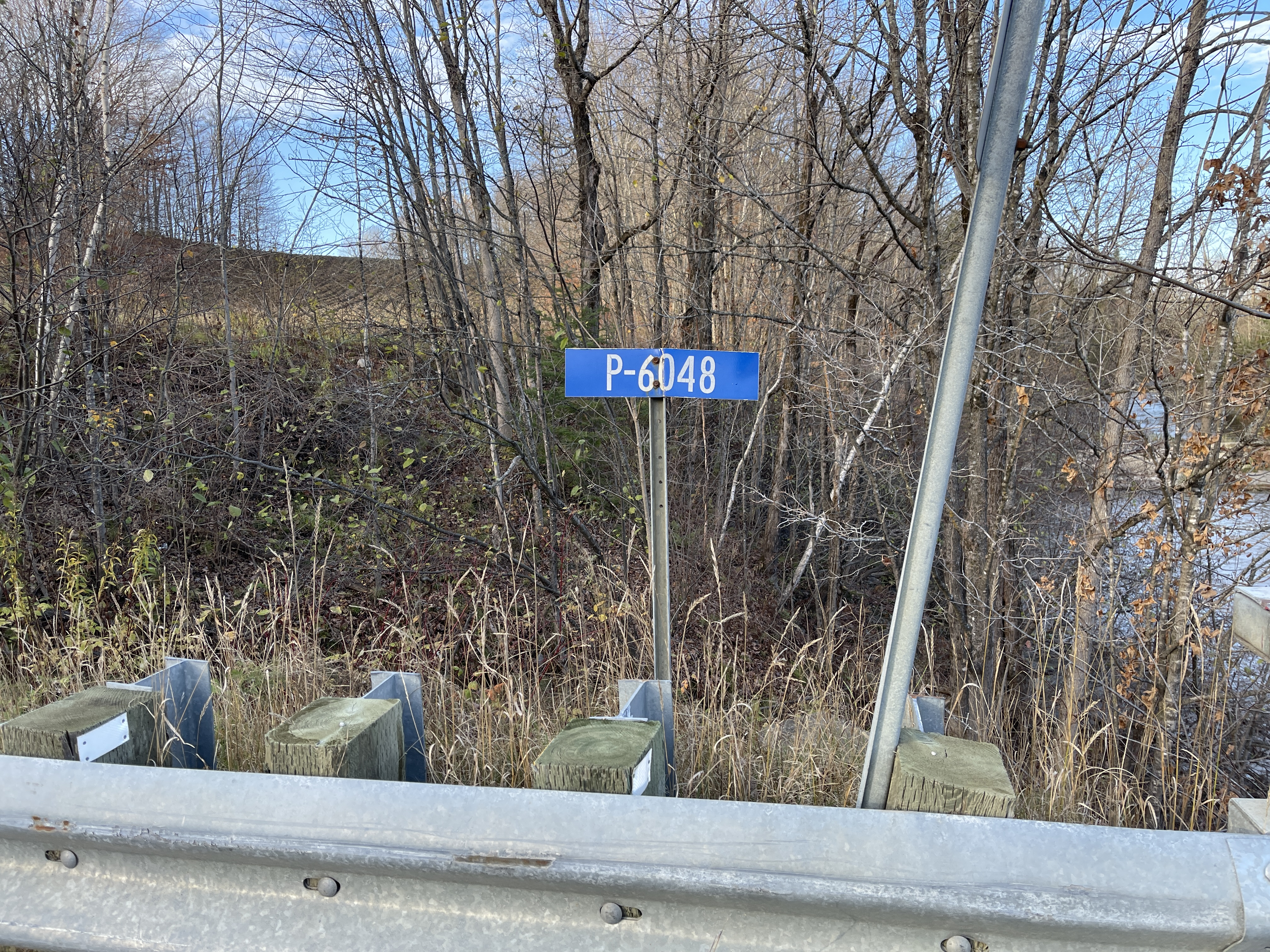
P-6048, steel girder structure, rang de la Rivière Blanche, Saint-Alban

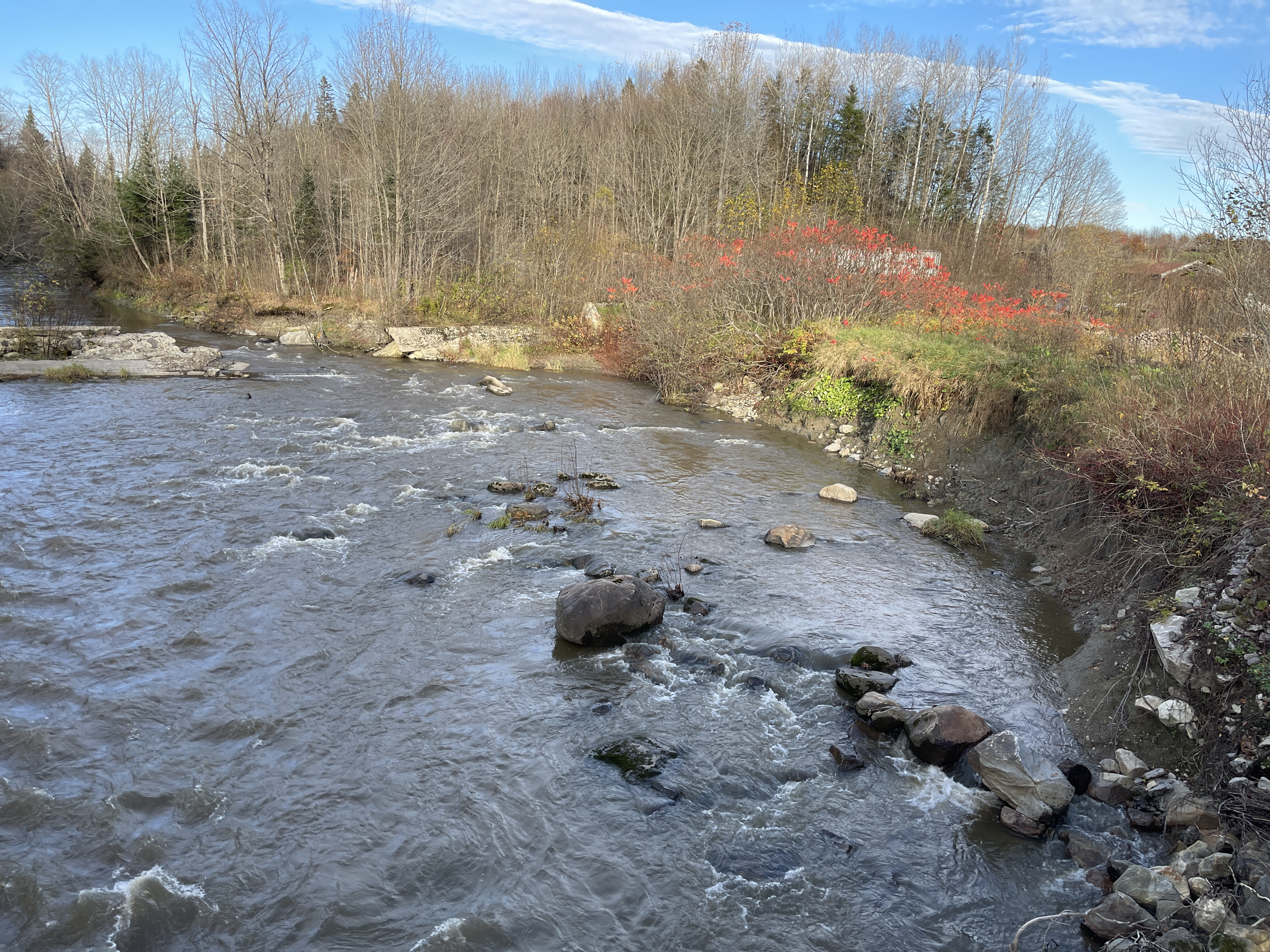
P-6048, rang de la Rivière Blanche, Saint-Alban

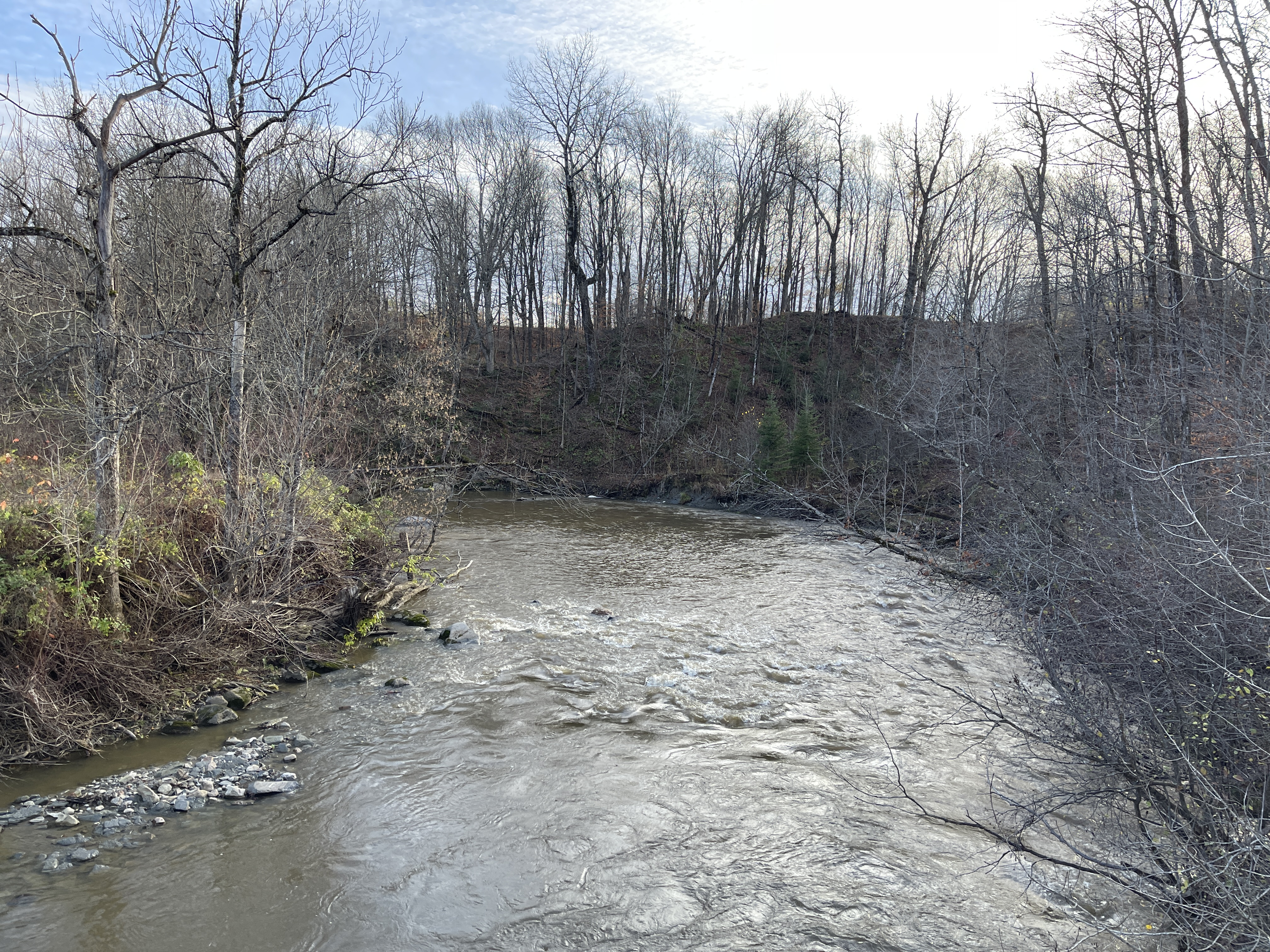
P-6048, rang de la Rivière Blanche, Saint-Alban

== Land use ==
The Blanche River watershed is located mainly in a forest environment, with the exception of the downstream section of the river, i.e. in a highly agricultural environment.

== See also ==
- Saint-Ubalde
- Saint-Thuribe
- Saint-Alban
- Saint-Casimir
- Portneuf Regional County Municipality
- Sainte-Anne River (Mauricie)
- Noire River (Sainte-Anne River)
- Weller River
- List of rivers of Quebec
