= Saint-Ubalde =

- Municipality
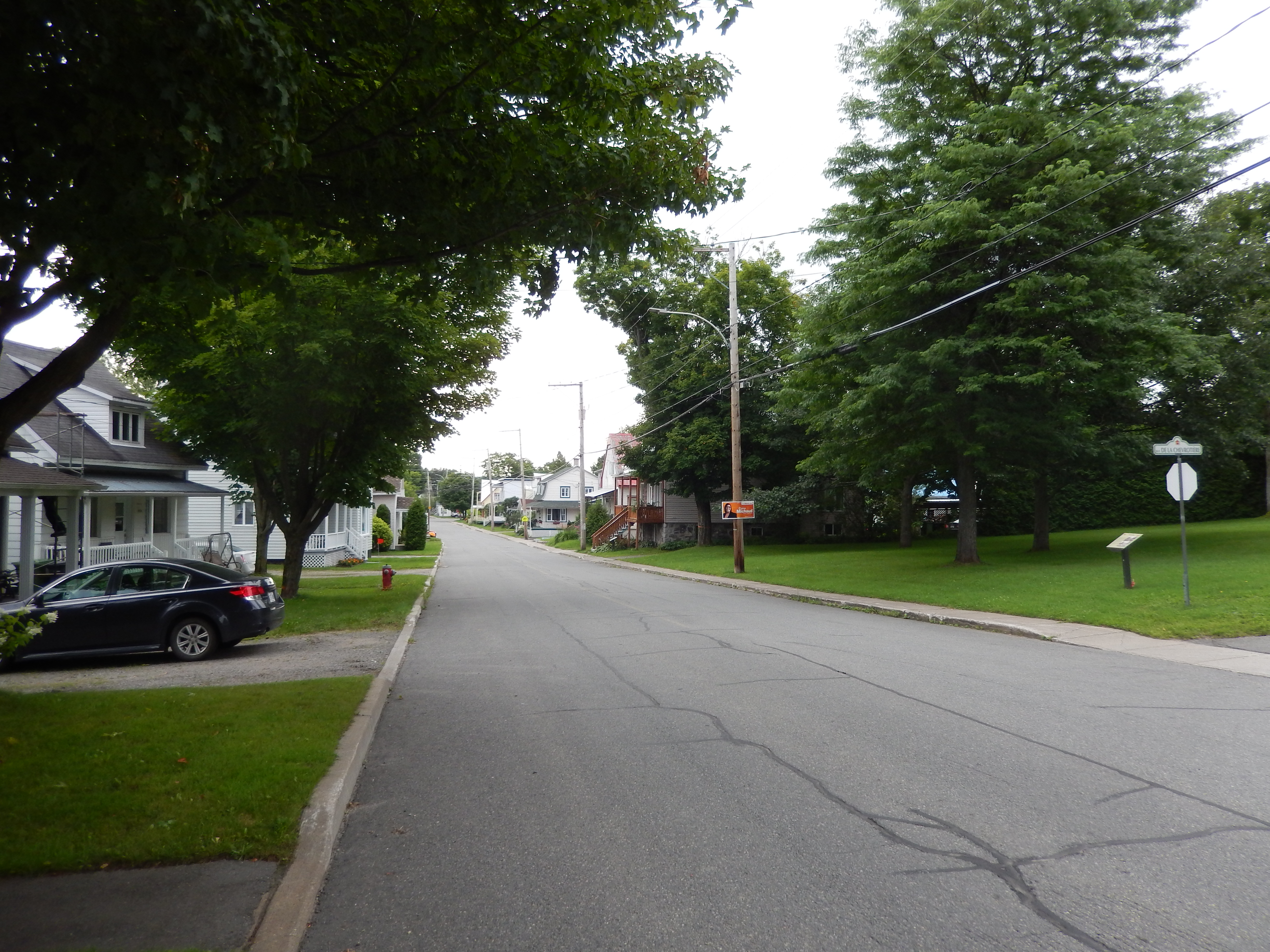
- Saint-Paul Street

- Coat of arms

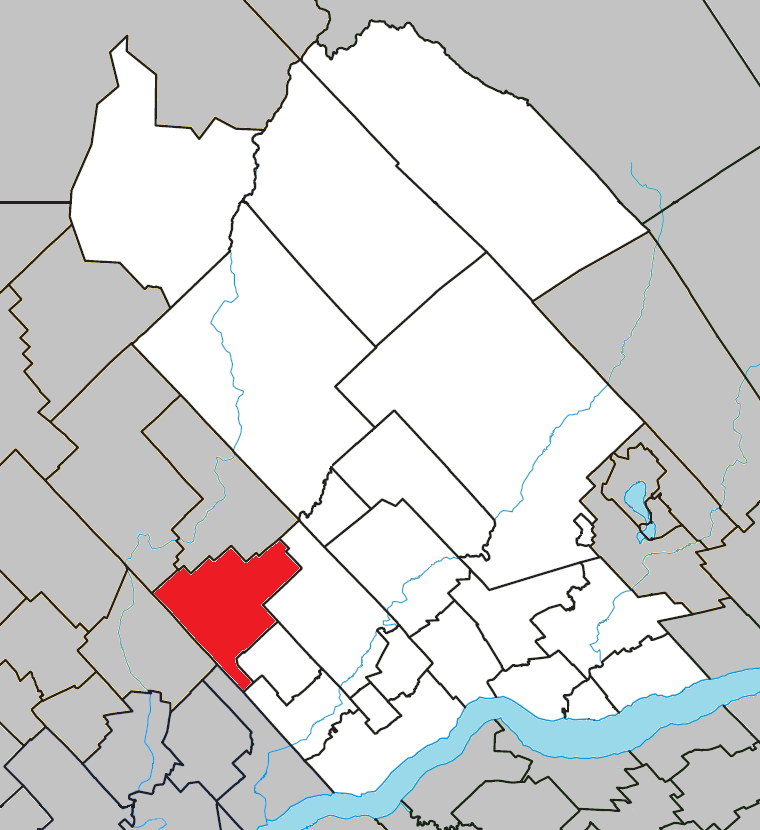
- Location within Portneuf RCM

- Location in central Quebec
- Coordinates: 46°45′N 72°16′W
- Country: Canada
- Province: Quebec
- Region: Capitale-Nationale
- RCM: Portneuf
- Settled: 1860
- Constituted: March 3, 1973

Government
  - Mayor: Guy Germain
  - Fed. riding: Saint-Augustin—Portneuf—Jacques-Cartier
  - Prov. riding: Portneuf

Area
  - Total: 147.42 km^{2} (56.92 sq mi)
  - Land: 140.72 km^{2} (54.33 sq mi)

Population (2021)
  - Total: 1,456
  - Density: 10.3/km^{2} (27/sq mi)
  - Pop (2016-21): ▲3.1%
  - Dwellings: 1,055
- Time zone: UTC−5 (EST)
  - Summer (DST): UTC−4 (EDT)
- Postal code(s): G0A 4L0
- Area codes: 418, 581
- Highways: R-363
- Website: saintubalde.com

Saint-Ubalde (French pronunciation: [sɛ̃t‿ybald]) is a rural municipality in Portneuf Regional County Municipality in the Canadian province of Quebec.

Geographically its territory is marked by an agricultural and populated area in the south-west, and an undeveloped hilly area in the north-east. The inhabited section is located in the southeast.

Numerous watercourses and lakes (Blanc, Sainte-Anne, Ricard, Thom) crisscross and dot is entire territory. Saint-Ubalde is centred on potato cultivation and outdoor recreation (canoeing, water skiing, fishing).

== History ==
Saint-Ubald (originally without an "e") was founded by people from Neuville in 1860, and the Saint-Ubald Mission was established that same year. It was named after Ubald Gingras (1824-1874), first sacristan of the place but originally from Pointe-aux-Trembles (Portneuf), and who was brother-in-law of Charles-François Baillargeon, archbishop of Quebec. The mission became a parish in 1866 by separating from Saint-Casimir. In 1873, the civil parish was formed and incorporated as a parish municipality. A year later, its post office opened.

In 1920, the village centre separated from the parish municipality to form the Village Municipality of Saint-Ubalde. But in 1973, the parish and village municipalities merged again to form the new Municipality of Saint-Ubalde.

== Geography ==
The municipality of Saint-Ubalde is located in the western part of the Portneuf RCM, 30 km north of Sainte-Anne-de-la-Pérade, bordering Saint-Casimir to the south. Numerous rivers and lakes (Blanc, Sainte-Anne, Ricard, Thom) criss-cross and dot the territory. The inhabited section is located in the southeast.

This agricultural community was founded by people from Neuville in 1860 and is focused on vacationing (canoeing, water skiing, trout fishing). Saint-Ubalde is renowned for potato farming, an activity that has given rise to a festival since 1974 that celebrates it as the Kingdom of the Potato.

== Demographics ==
Historical census populations – Saint-Ubalde

Year	Pop.	±%
1976	1,521	—
1981	1,605	+5.5%
1986	1,660	+3.4%
1991	1,552	−6.5%
1996	1,540	−0.8%

Year	Pop.	±%
2001	1,460	−5.2%
2006	1,458	−0.1%
2011	1,403	−3.8%
2016	1,412	+0.6%
2021	1,456	+3.1%

Source: Statistics Canada

Private dwellings occupied by usual residents (2021): 735 (total dwellings: 1055)

Mother tongue (2021):

- English as first language: 1.4%
- French as first language: 97.9%
- English and French as first languages: 0.3%
- Other as first language: 0.7%

== See also ==
- Portneuf Regional Natural Park
- Ubald of Gubbio
