= Zec de la Rivière-Jacques-Cartier =

- Location within Quebec
- Location: Canada, Quebec, Portneuf Regional County Municipality
- Nearest city: Donnacona
- Coordinates: 46°43′N 71°43′W
- Area: Length of 42 kilometres (26 mi)
- Established: 1991

The zec de la Rivière-Jacques-Cartier is a "zone d'exploitation contrôlée" (controlled harvesting zone) (zec) in the municipality of Donnacona, in the Portneuf Regional County Municipality, in the administrative area of the Capitale-Nationale, in Quebec, in Canada.

== Geography ==
With a length of 161 kilometres (100 mi) (or 177 km depending to the references), the Jacques-Cartier River takes it source in Jacques Cartier Lake, in Laurentides Wildlife Reserve, in the region of the Capitale-Nationale. The waters descend south to the mouth that flows into the St. Lawrence River between Cap-Santé and Donnacona, at 30 kilometers west of Quebec City. A lower segment of 41 km of the river is managed by the "zec de la Rivière-Jacques-Cartier".

The Jacques-Cartier River drains a watershed of 2,515 square kilometres (971 sq mi):

- nearly 160 kilometres (99 mi) of massive Laurentides in the Grenville geologic province (one of the youngest Canadian Shield sections formed there 955 million of years);
- in sedimentary rocks Lowlands of St. Lawrence, dating back 500 million years, about 17 kilometres (11 mi) from the municipality of Pont-Rouge to its mouth.

The course of the river is mainly in forested area. However, the last segment of the path of the river is generally in agriculture (some forested areas) and the river pass through different villages (from the north): Vacation Village of Valcaltier, Shannon, Sainte-Catherine-de-la-Jacques-Cartier, Pont-Rouge and Donnacona.

Territory of Zec

A 42 kilometres (26 mi) segment of the river under the administration of the zec begins at the mouth of the Jacques-Cartier River upstream to Shannon, located near the CFB Valcartier. The top part, segments of the river under the aegis of Zec are discontinuous. The upper limit of the zec is just north of the bridge Railway CN in Shannon. The river segment administered by the zec counts 46 small islands.

== Toponymy ==
The names "Zec de la Rivière-Jacques-Cartier", the "Jacques-Cartier National Park" and the La Jacques-Cartier Regional County Municipality are directly related to the name of the river and lake head. This name was formalized on June 7, 1991, at the Bank of place names of the Commission de toponymie du Québec (Geographical Names Board of Quebec).

== See also ==
- Donnacona, a municipality
- Portneuf Regional County Municipality
- Jacques-Cartier River
- Saint-Raymond, a municipality
- Laurentides Wildlife Reserve (Réserve faunique des Laurentides)
- Portneuf Regional County Municipality
- Capitale-Nationale, administrative region of Quebec
- Zone d'exploitation contrôlée (controlled harvesting zone) (ZEC)
