= Andante Mount =

Canadian geological feature

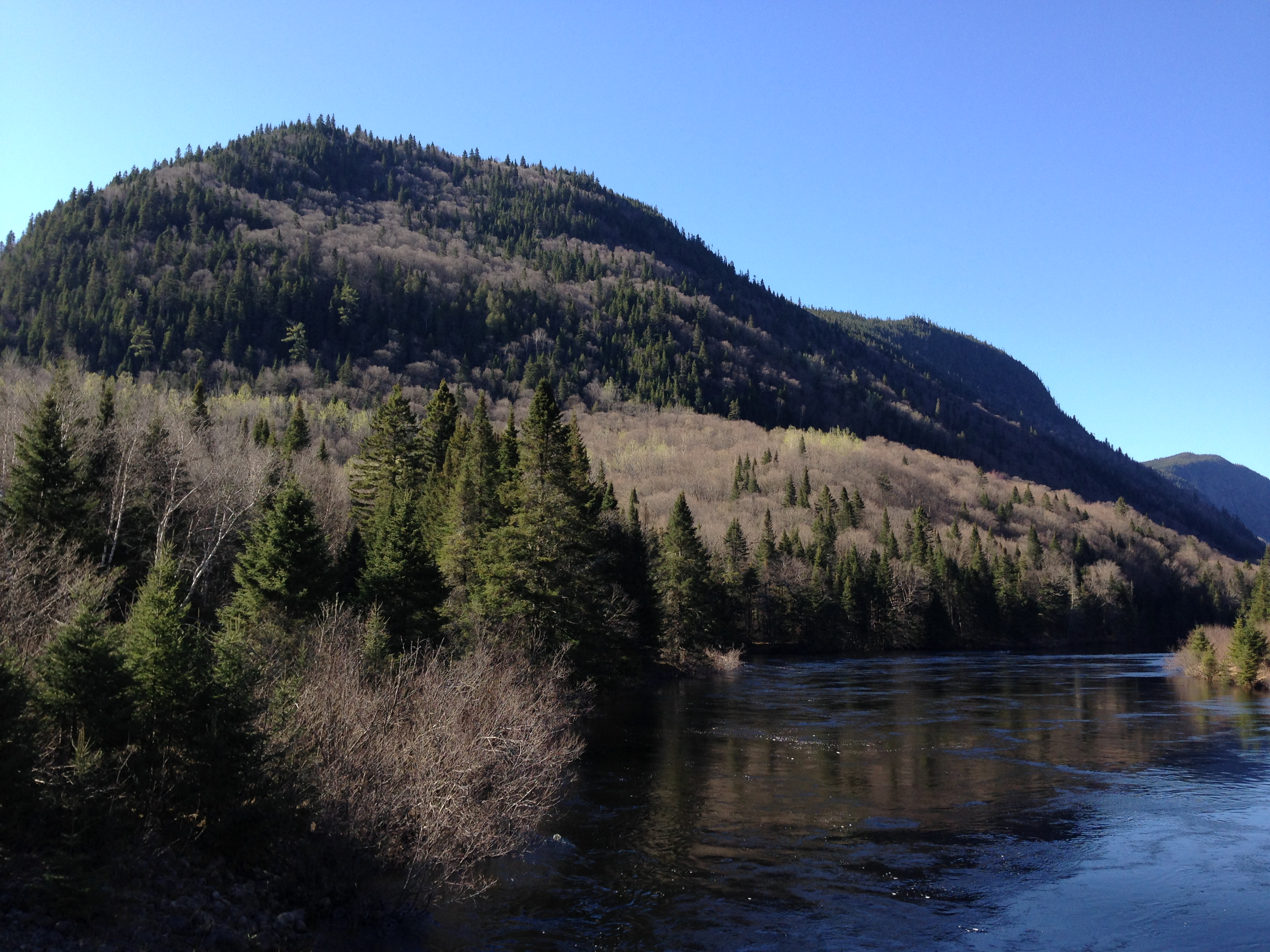

Highest point
- Peak: 810

Geography
- Location within Quebec
- Country: Canada
- Region: Quebec
- Range coordinates: 47°20′10″N 71°27′45″W
- Parent range: Laurentian Mountains

The Mont Andante culminates at 810 metres (2,660 ft) in the western part of Jacques-Cartier National Park, in the unorganized territory of Lac-Croche, in the La Jacques-Cartier Regional County Municipality, in the administrative region of Capitale-Nationale, in Quebec, Canada.

== Geography ==
Mont Andante runs along the west bank of the Jacques-Cartier River north of the city of Quebec. The summit is located at:

- 1.6 kilometres (0.99 mi) west of the course of the Jacques-Cartier River;
- 3.0 kilometres (1.9 mi) of the western limit of Jacques-Cartier National Park;
- 7.3 kilometres (4.5 mi) south-east of Petit lac Jacques-Cartier;
- 19.5 kilometres (12.1 mi) north-west of the village center of Stoneham-et-Tewkesbury;
- 20.4 kilometres (12.7 mi) west of route 175.

The cliff on the east side of Mount Andante overlooks the Jacques-Cartier River. Access to the top of the mountain is easier on the north and west sides.

== Mountain path ==
The Scotora trail from Jacques-Cartier National Park provides access to the summit of Mount Andante. This well-developed trail is the furthest from the park entrance located at 103 chemin du Parc-National in Stoneham-et-Tewkesbury. To reach it from the entrance to the park, it is necessary to take the Chemin du Parc-National until km 30 where a parking lot is provided. From there, hikers cross the bridge on the other side of the road and follow the directions for Le Scotora trail. This stony path is under forest cover and runs along a stream in the valley where the beavers have built dikes.

== History ==
Formerly, this segment of the historic path was taken by the Amerindians and the Jesuit missionaries to walk from Quebec to their mission of Métabetchouane at lac Saint-Jean, where a fur trading post, established in 1676, was closed in 1703.

== Toponymy ==
In 1989, the Commission de toponymie du Québec designated three mountains in the Jacques-Cartier National Park by the names Adagio, Allegro and Andante. Of Italian origin, these three words correspond to three types of movements (adagio, slow; allegro, lively; andante, moderate) that one meets in classical music (symphony, concerto, sonata, etc.). These toponyms evoke the titles of the first literary works of Félix Leclerc (1914–1988), famous singer and prolific writer.

Félix Leclerc's collection of stories Adagio was published in 1943, as well as the fables and poems contained in Allegro and Andante, published in 1944. These literary works reveal the poet's great love for nature and his deep respect for peasant morality, always steeped in the rhythm of the seasons and the needs of the land. Born in La Tuque on August 2, 1914, Félix Leclerc lived in a family who loved music. Félix Leclerc sang for the first time on the radio in 1939, did theater, notably with the Compagnons de Saint-Laurent, between 1943 and 1945, and founded, with others, the VLM theater troupe in 1948. After a stay three years in France, where he won, in 1951, for his song "Moi, mes souliers ...", the Grand Prize of the disc of the Charles-Cros Academy, he returned to Quebec, where his merits will earn him the highest distinctions and numerous awards, including the Order of Canada in 1968, the Calixa-Lavallée award in 1975, the Denise-Pelletier award in 1977 and the Ordre national du Québec in 1985. Félix Leclerc died on August 8, 1988, at Île d'Orléans where he had settled in 1970.

The toponym “Mont Andante” was formalized on February 7, 1989, at the Place Names Bank of the Commission de toponymie du Québec.

== See also ==
- La Jacques-Cartier Regional County Municipality
- Lac-Croche, an unorganized territory
- Jacques-Cartier National Park
- Laurentides Wildlife Reserve
- Lac Jacques-Cartier Massif
