= Cassian River =

Rivière Cassian
- Location within Quebec

Location
- Country: Canada
- Province: Quebec
- Region: Capitale-Nationale
- Regional County Municipality: La Jacques-Cartier Regional County Municipality

Physical characteristics
- Source: Monière Lake
  - location: Stoneham-et-Tewkesbury
  - coordinates: 46°59′36″N 71°36′52″W
  - elevation: 703
- Mouth: Jacques-Cartier River
  - location: Saint-Gabriel-de-Valcartier
  - coordinates: 47°01′26″N 71°29′18″W
  - elevation: 180 m
- Length: 28.5 km (17.7 mi)

Basin features
- Tributaries
  - left: (Clockwise from the mouth) Décharge d'un lac non identifié, décharge du lac Chartré, décharge du lac des Bouleaux, décharge d'un ensemble de lacs (Richou, Demers, Bastien), décharge du lac Barré, du lac Dubois et du Petit lac Dubois.
  - right: (Clockwise from the mouth) Décharge du lac Michel, décharge du lac Pageau et du Petit lac Pageau.

The Cassian River is a tributary of the Jacques-Cartier River, flowing in the municipalities of Saint-Gabriel-de-Valcartier and Stoneham-et-Tewkesbury, in the La Jacques-Cartier Regional County Municipality, in the administrative region of Capitale-Nationale, in Quebec, Canada.

The Cassian River valley is served by secondary forest roads. The lower part is served indirectly by the Tewkesbury road which passes on the east side of the Jacques-Cartier river.

Forestry is the main economic activity in the sector; recreational tourism, second. The Tantaré Ecological Reserve covers part of Cassian Lake. In addition, the hydrographic slope of the Cassian river includes 4.77 square kilometres (1.84 sq mi) in Jacques-Cartier National Park.

The surface of the Cassian River (except the rapids areas) is generally frozen from the beginning of December to the end of March; safe circulation on the ice is generally done from the end of December to the beginning of March. The water level of the river varies with the seasons and the precipitation; the spring flood occurs in March or April.

== Geography ==
The main watersheds adjacent to the Cassian River are:

- north side: Jacques-Cartier River;
- east side: Jacques-Cartier River, Saint-Thomas lake, Saint-Vincent stream;
- south side: rivière aux Pins, Jacques-Cartier River, St. Lawrence River;
- west side: Tourilli River, Chézine River.

From the mouth of lake Monière the course of the river descends on 28.5 kilometres (17.7 mi) according to the following segments:

- 3.4 kilometres (2.1 mi) to the south, in particular by crossing Chandler Lake (length: 0.8 kilometres (0.50 mi); altitude: 669 metres (2,195 ft)), to its mouth;
- 4.9 kilometres (3.0 mi) to the south by collecting the outlet (coming from the north) from Lac Barré and the outlet (coming from the east) from Lakes Richou, Demers and Bastien, as well as crossing the lake Boisselle (length: 1.2 kilometres (0.75 mi); altitude: 624 metres (2,047 ft)), to its mouth;
- 0.7 kilometres (0.43 mi) westward crossing a series of rapids and collecting the discharge (coming from the north) from Lac Pageau and Petit lac Pageau, to a bend in the river;
- 2.8 kilometres (1.7 mi) to the south, in particular by collecting the outlet (coming from the east) from Lac des Bouleaux and crossing Lake Levraut (length: 0.6 kilometres (0.37 mi); altitude : 559 metres (1,834 ft)), to its mouth;
- 5.4 kilometres (3.4 mi) to the south, crossing consecutively on 2.0 kilometres (1.2 mi) Lac de la Vessie (altitude: 556 metres (1,824 ft)) and on 2.2 kilometres (1.4 mi) Lac Cassian (altitude: 556 metres (1,824 ft)), to the dam at its mouth. Note: The shape of Cassian Lake resembles a boot whose toes touch the dam to the southeast. A strait of a hundred meters connects Lac de la Vessie and Lac Cassian;
- 1.4 kilometres (0.87 mi) to the east, collecting the outlet from Lac Chartré, to a bend in the river;
- 7.5 kilometres (4.7 mi) to the south in a deep valley gradually bending eastwards, up to a bend in the river;
- 1.2 kilometres (0.75 mi) to the south in a small plain, in parallel on the west side over the Jacques-Cartier river, to its mouth.

The Cassian River flows onto the west bank of the Jacques-Cartier River. From this confluence, the current descends on 31.8 kilometres (19.8 mi) generally towards the south following the course of the Jacques-Cartier River which flows on the northwest bank of the Saint-Laurent River.

== Toponymy ==
The toponym "Cassian River" was formalized on December 5, 1968 at the Place Names Bank of the Commission de toponymie du Québec.

== See also ==
- Saint-Gabriel-de-Valcartier, a municipality
- La Jacques-Cartier Regional County Municipality
- Jacques-Cartier River
- Jacques-Cartier National Park
- Tantaré Ecological Reserve
- List of rivers of Quebec

== Bibliography ==
- Jacques-Cartier Basin Corporation (2013). Plan directeur de l'eau de la zone de gestion intégrée de l'eau de la Jacques-Cartier (English: Water Master Plan for the Jacques-Cartier Integrated Water Management Zone) (PDF). p. 391.(in French).
