= Cachée River =

Cachée river may refer to:

- Cachée River (Jacques-Cartier River tributary), a stream of Stoneham-et-Tewkesbury, Quebec, Canada
- Cachée River (Mauvaise River tributary), a watercourse of Saint-Raymond, Quebec, Canada
- Cachée River (Saint-Maurice River tributary), on the north bank of the Saint Lawrence River in Notre-Dame-du-Mont-Carmel, Quebec, Canada
