= Cachée River (Jacques-Cartier River tributary) =

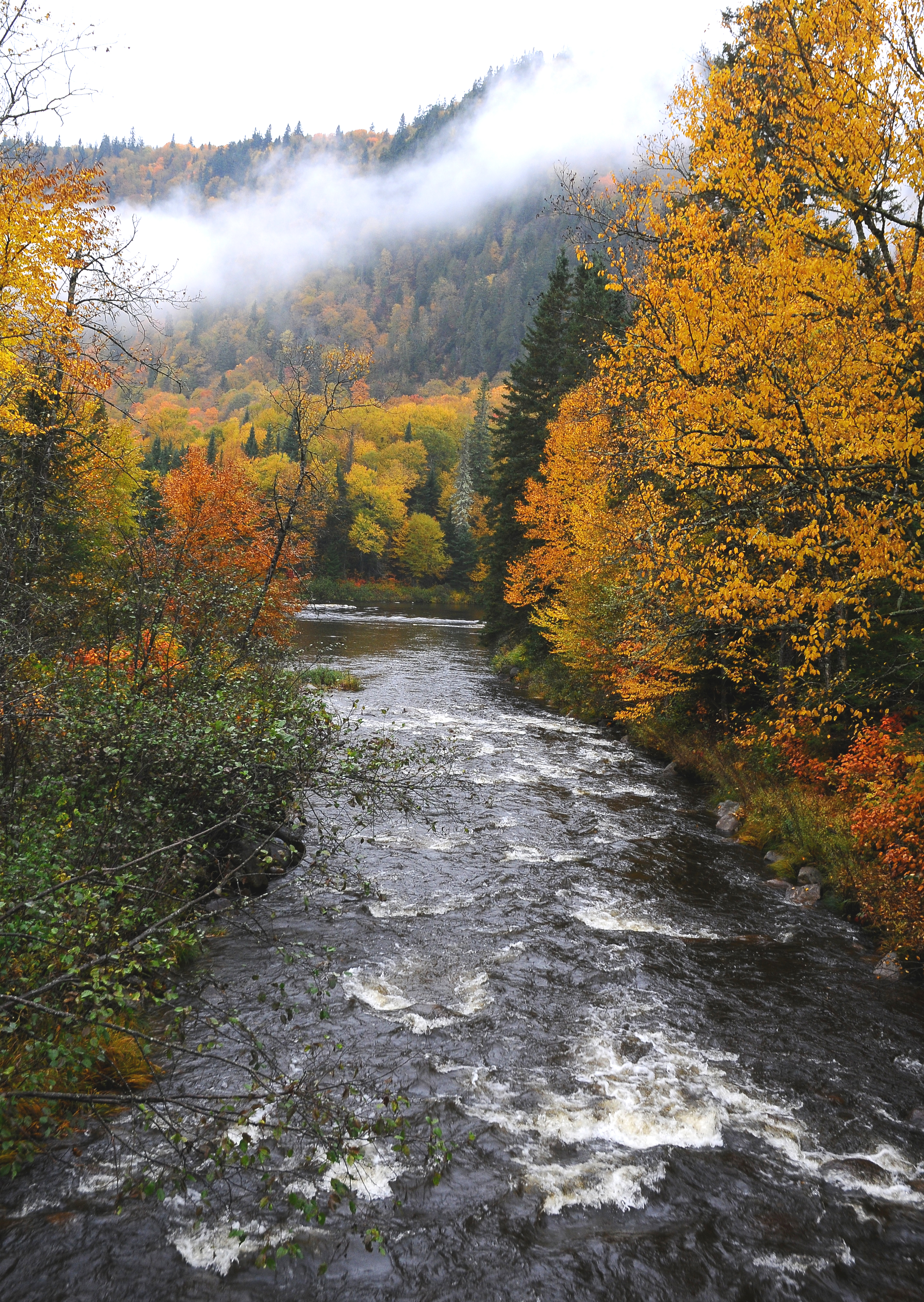

- Location within Quebec

Location
- Country: Canada
- Province: Quebec
- Region: Capitale-Nationale
- Regional County Municipality: La Jacques-Cartier and La Côte-de-Beaupré
- Unorganized territory and a municipality: Lac-Jacques-Cartier and Stoneham-et-Tewkesbury

Physical characteristics
- Source: Cachée Lake
  - location: Lac-Jacques-Cartier
  - coordinates: 47°14′36″N 71°09′54″W
  - elevation: 768
- Mouth: Jacques-Cartier River
  - location: Stoneham-et-Tewkesbury
  - coordinates: 47°06′43″N 71°21′56″W
  - elevation: 250 m
- Length: 26.9 km (16.7 mi)

Basin features
- Tributaries
  - left: (Upward from the mouth) Décharge des lacs Côté et Taché, décharge du lac Garneau, ruisseau Bureau (décharge du lac Bureau).
  - right: (Upward from the mouth) Ruisseau non identifié, décharge du Lac de l'Entrée, décharge du lac Joncas.

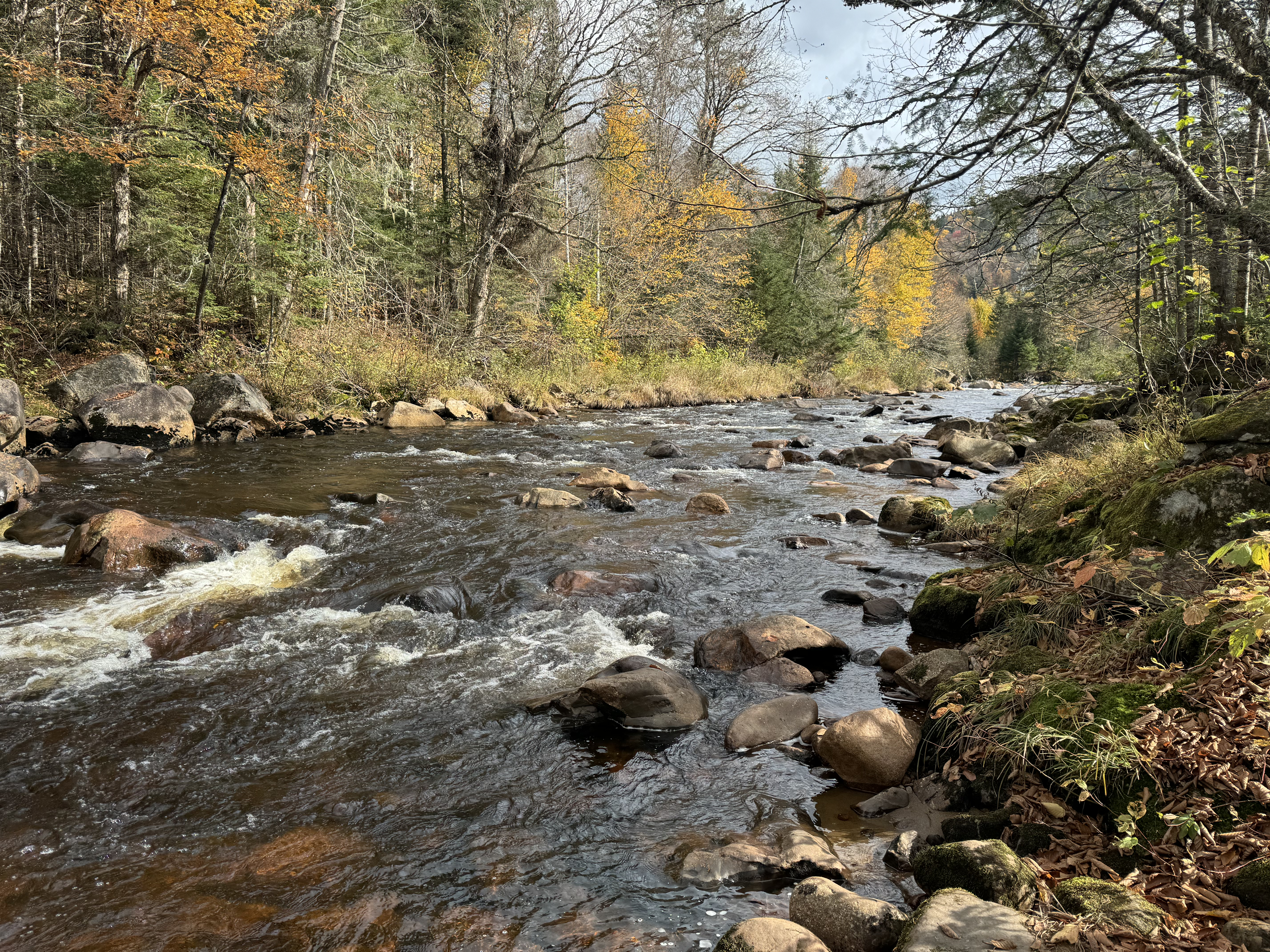
The river in fall 2024

The Rivière Cachée is a tributary of the Jacques-Cartier River, flowing in the administrative region of Capitale-Nationale, in Quebec, Canada. The course of the river crosses the unorganized territory of Lac-Jacques-Cartier in the La Côte-de-Beaupré Regional County Municipality, as well as the township municipality unis de Stoneham-et-Tewkesbury, located in the MRC La Jacques-Cartier Regional County Municipality.

The course of the river flows entirely in a forest zone in the Jacques-Cartier National Park which is affiliated with the Société des établissements de plein air du Québec (Sépaq).

The Cachée river valley is mainly served by the route 175 which links the towns of Quebec and Saguenay. A few secondary roads serve this area for forestry and recreational tourism activities.

Forestry is the main economic activity in the sector; recreational tourism, second.

The surface of the Cachée River (except the rapids areas) is generally frozen from the beginning of December to the end of March; safe circulation on the ice is generally done from the end of December to the beginning of March. The water level of the river varies with the seasons and the precipitation; the spring flood occurs in March or April.

== Geography ==
The Cachée river draws its source from Lac Caché (length: 0.5 kilometres (0.31 mi); altitude: 768 metres (2,520 ft)), located in the unorganized territory of Lac-Jacques-Cartier, in the Laurentides Wildlife Reserve (at the eastern limit of Jacques-Cartier National Park), in the MRC of La Côte-de-Beaupré Regional County Municipality. This head lake is located between two mountains, on the southern slope of the watershed with the hydrographic slope of the Montmorency River.

The Cachée River drains a catchment area of 93 square kilometres (36 sq mi).

From the mouth of the Cachée, the course of the Cachée river descends on 26.9 kilometres (16.7 mi) towards the southwest generally up to the Jacques-Cartier River with a drop of 518 metres (1,699 ft) according to the following segments:

- 3.5 kilometres (2.2 mi) to the south in a deep valley, forming a loop to the northwest and another to the east, up to the two bridges of the route 175;
- 3.5 kilometres (2.2 mi) to the south in a deep valley, more or less along route 175 to Bureau stream (coming from the east),
- 3.7 kilometres (2.3 mi) to the south in a deep valley, more or less along route 175, up to the hamlet "Barrière-de-Stoneham";
- 14.3 kilometres (8.9 mi) to the southwest in a deep valley, more or less along route 175 to Taché stream (coming from the southeast);
- 1.9 kilometres (1.2 mi) to the west almost entirely in the rapids zone with a drop of 80 metres (260 ft) in this segment by crossing numerous rapids and forming a hook towards the south west to its mouth.

The Cachée river flows on the east bank of the Jacques-Cartier River, south of the Montagne de l'Épaule and opposite the Montagne de la Cachée. Facing this confluence, the hamlet Rivière-Cachée is located on the south bank of the Cachée river and on the east side of the Jacques-Cartier river. From this confluence, the current descends the Jacques-Cartier River for 42.2 kilometres (26.2 mi) generally south to the northeast bank of the St. Lawrence River.

== Toponymy ==
The 1852 map of provincial surveyor Frederic William Blaiklock mentions "River Caché". The traditional indigenous variant of the toponym is Taontaraseti, the name the Wendats use to speak of the Hidden River.

The toponym "Rivière Cachée" was formalized on December 5, 1968 at the Place Names Bank of the Commission de toponymie du Québec.

== See also ==
- Laurentides Wildlife Reserve
- Jacques-Cartier National Park
- Montagne de l'Épaule
- Montagne de la Cachée
- Lac-Jacques-Cartier, a TNO
- Stoneham-et-Tewkesbury, a municipality
- La Côte-de-Beaupré Regional County Municipality
- La Jacques-Cartier Regional County Municipality
- Jacques-Cartier River
- List of rivers of Quebec

== Bibliography ==
- Jacques-Cartier Basin Corporation (2013). Plan directeur de l'eau de la zone de gestion intégrée de l'eau de la Jacques-Cartier [Water Master Plan for the Jacques-Cartier Integrated Water Management Zone)] (PDF) (in French). p. 391..
