= Andante =

Andante may refer to:

== Arts ==
- Andante (tempo), a moderately slow musical tempo
- Andante (manga), a shōjo manga by Miho Obana
- "Andante" (song), a song by Hitomi Yaida
- "Andante, Andante", a 1980 song by ABBA from Super Trouper
- Andante (TV series), a South Korean television series
- "Andante" (Homeland), an episode of Homeland
- "Andante", a song by Super Junior from A-Cha, a repackage of Mr. Simple

== Toponyms ==
- Andante Mount, a peak in Jacques-Cartier National Park, Capitale-Nationale, Quebec, Canada

== See also ==
- Winsome Andante, a British sport horse
- The Andantes, a 1960s female sessions group for Motown
- Andante ticket, a public transport ticketing system in Porto, Portugal
