= Cook River (Jacques-Cartier River tributary) =

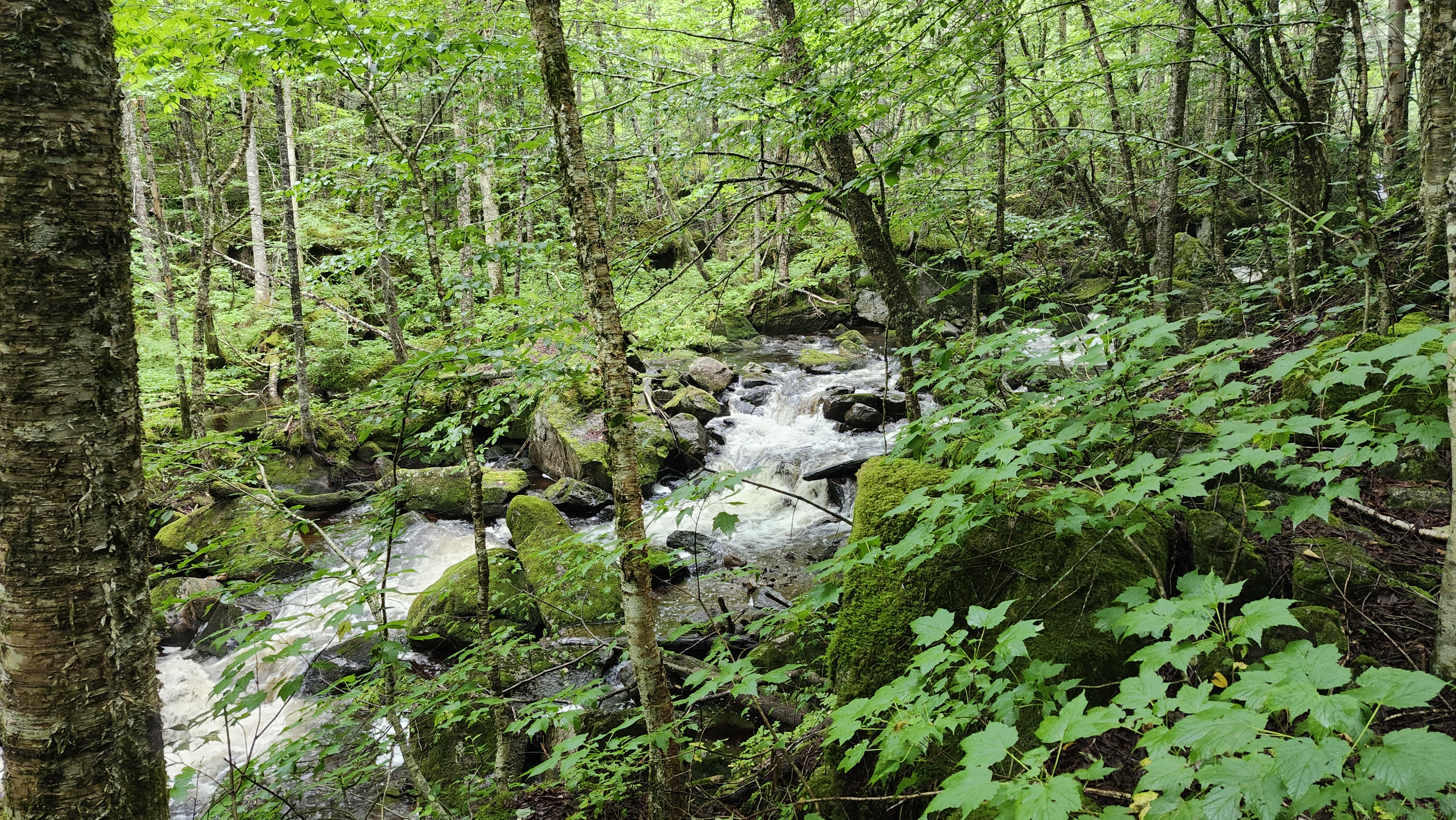

- Location within Quebec

Location
- Country: Canada
- Province: Quebec
- Region: Capitale-Nationale
- Regional County Municipality: La Jacques-Cartier Regional County Municipality
- Unorganized territory: Lac-Croche

Physical characteristics
- Source: Cook Lake
  - location: Lac-Croche
  - coordinates: 47°21′20″N 71°29′20″W
  - elevation: 730
- Mouth: Jacques-Cartier River
  - location: Lac-Croche
  - coordinates: 47°18′55″N 71°27′29″W
  - elevation: 610 m
- Length: 4.5 km (2.8 mi)

Basin features
- Tributaries
  - left: Discharge of an unidentified lake.
  - right: Discharge of lac Bréboeuf.

The Cook River is a tributary of the Jacques-Cartier River, flowing in Jacques-Cartier National Park, in the unorganized territory of Lac-Croche, in the La Jacques-Cartier Regional County Municipality, in the administrative region of Capitale-Nationale, in Quebec, Canada.

The upper part of the Cook River valley is served by secondary forest roads.

Forestry is the main economic activity in the sector; recreational tourism activities, second.

The surface of the Cook River (except rapids) is generally frozen from early December to late March; safe circulation on the ice is generally done from the end of December to the beginning of March. The water level of the river varies with the seasons and the precipitation; the spring flood occurs in March or April.

== Geography ==
The main watersheds adjacent to the Cook River are:

- north side: Petit lac Jacques-Cartier, rivière Jacques-Cartier Nord-Ouest, Jacques-Cartier River;
- east side: Jacques-Cartier River;
- south side: Chézine River, North Chézine River;
- west side: Batiscan Lake.

The Cook River rises at Cook Lake (length: 1.3 kilometres (0.81 mi); altitude: 730 metres (2,400 ft)). From the mouth of Cook Lake, the course of the Cook River descends over 4.5 kilometres (2.8 mi) according to the following segments:

- 2.3 kilometres (1.4 mi) south-east, to the outlet (coming from the west) of Lac Bréboeuf;
- 2.2 kilometres (1.4 mi) south-east in a deep valley, to its mouth.

The Cook River flows onto the west bank of the Jacques-Cartier River in an area of rapids. From this confluence, the current descends on 55.4 kilometres (34.4 mi) generally towards the south following the course of the Jacques-Cartier River which flows on the northwest bank of the St. Lawrence River.

== Toponymy ==
The term Cook is a family name of English origin.

The Cook River toponym was formalized on November 7, 1985 at the Place Names Bank of the Commission de toponymie du Québec.

== See also ==
- Lac-Croche, an unorganized territory
- La Jacques-Cartier, a MRC
- Jacques-Cartier River
- Jacques-Cartier National Park
- List of rivers of Quebec

== Bibliography ==
- Jacques-Cartier Basin Corporation (2013). Water Master Plan for the Jacques-Cartier Integrated Water Management Zone (PDF). p. 391.
