= Jacques-Cartier Lake =

Lake in Québec, Canada

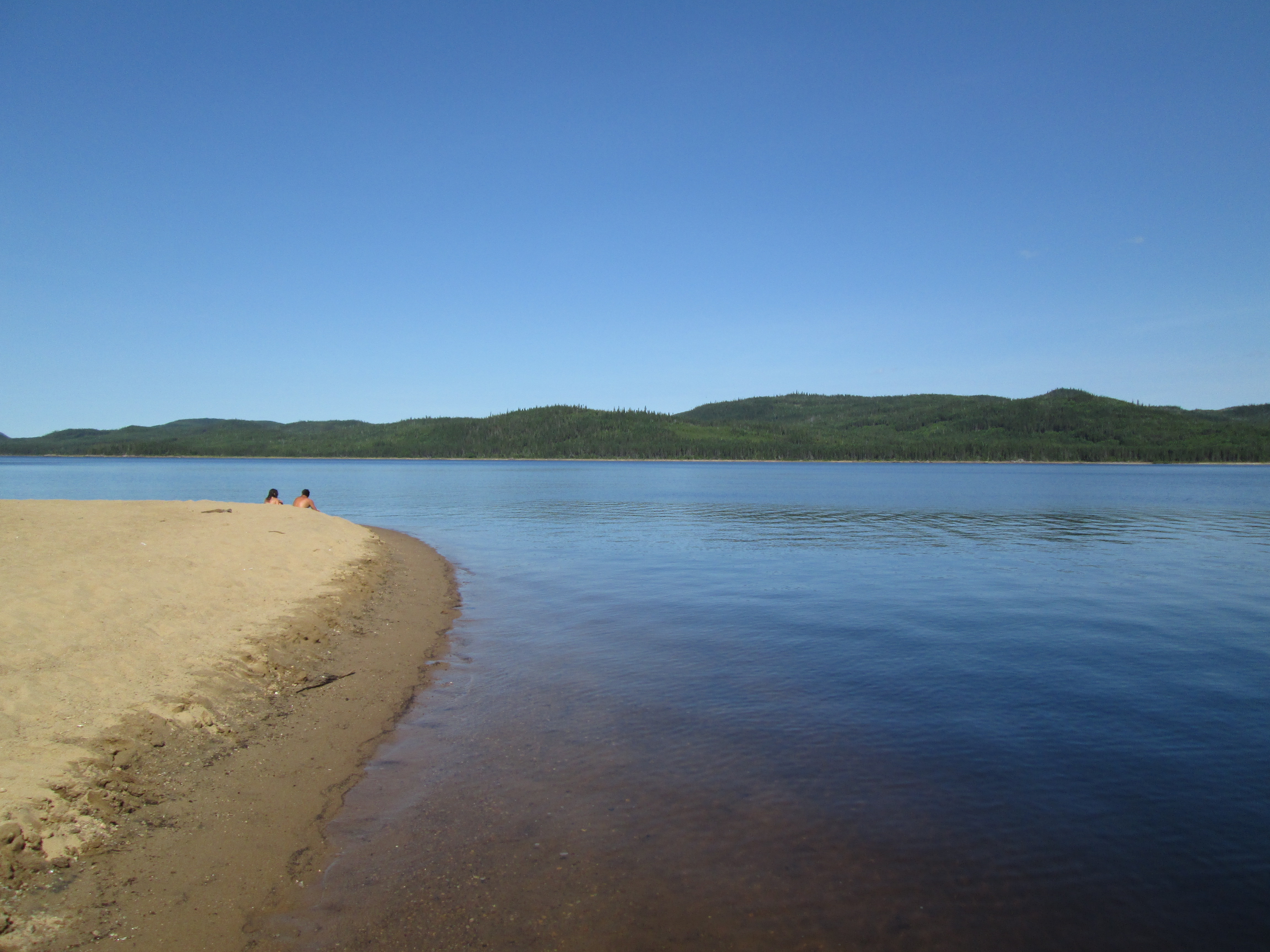
- A beach of Jacques-Cartier Lake

- Location in Quebec
- Location: Lac-Jacques-Cartier, La Côte-de-Beaupré Regional County Municipality
- Coordinates: 47.5852°N 71.2073°W
- Lake type: Natural
- Primary inflows: (clockwise from the mouth) Décharge du lac Plamondon et décharge des lacs Nadreau, Grandpré et "lac Petit Pré".
- Primary outflows: =Jacques-Cartier River
- Basin countries: Canada
- Max. length: 9.2 km (5.7 mi)
- Max. width: 1.8 km (1.1 mi)
- Average depth: 69 m (226 ft)
- Surface elevation: 783 m (2,569 ft)

The lac Jacques-Cartier, main source of the Jacques-Cartier River, is a glacial lake located in the Laurentides Wildlife Reserve, about 90 km to the north of the city of Quebec, in the unorganized territory of Lac-Jacques-Cartier, in the La Côte-de-Beaupré Regional County Municipality, in the administrative region of Capitale-Nationale, in the province of Quebec, in Canada.

The area around the lake is served by the route 175 which passes on the west shore, for the needs of forestry and recreational tourism activities.

Forestry is the main economic activity in this sector; recreational tourism, second.

The surface of Lake Jacques-Cartier is usually frozen from the beginning of December to the end of March, however the safe circulation on the ice is generally made from mid-December to mid-March.

== Geography ==
The main hydrographic slopes near Lac Jacques-Cartier are:

- north side: Pikauba River, Lac des Pas Perdus, Verchères Lake, Jacqueline Lake, Franchère Lake;
- east side: Montmorency River, Malbaie River, Malbaie Lake, Neiges Lake, rivière du Gouffre, rivière à la Loutre;
- south side: Montmorency River, Sept-Îles Lake, Jacques-Cartier River, Jacques-Cartier North-West River, Sautauriski River;
- west side: Beauséjour lake, Launières River, Banville lake.

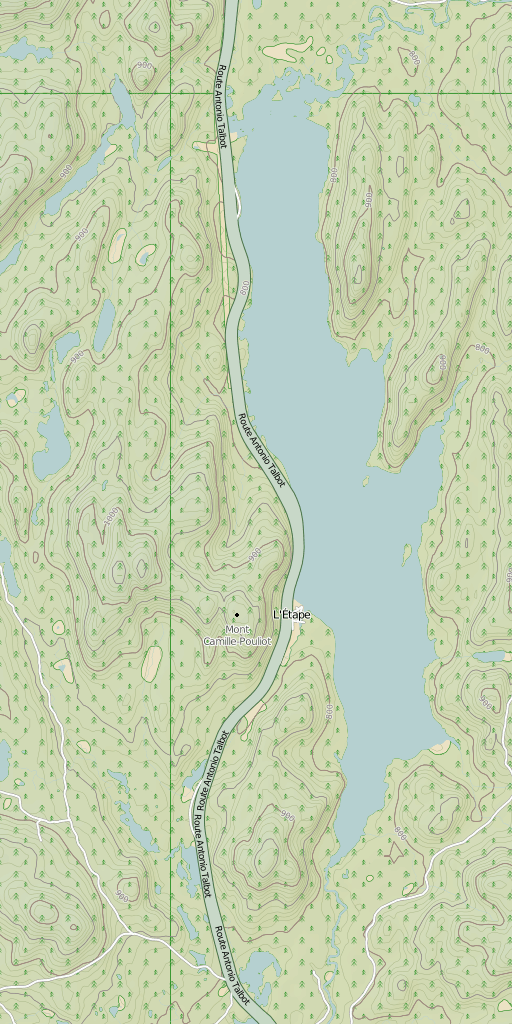
Lake map

The lake is located in the unorganized territory of Lac-Jacques-Cartier. The Nadreau Lake constitutes the head water body of the Jacques-Cartier River. This lake receives the waters on the west side of two small lakes: Plamondon lake (altitude: 844 metres (2,769 ft)) and an unnamed lake (862 metres (2,828 ft)). Lake Nadreau discharges 180 m north into Lake Grandpré (altitude: 847 m). The latter empties westwards into "Petit Pré lake" (440 m long; altitude: 838 m).

From the mouth of "Lac Petit Pré", the Jacques-Cartier River flows 15.6 km northwest in the county of Montmorency to reach Lake Jacques-Cartier.

Lake Jacques-Cartier, 9.2 km long, 1.8 km wide on average and 69 m deep, is the largest lake in the Laurentides Wildlife Reserve. At an altitude of approximately 795 m, it borders, to the east, Mont Camille-Pouliot (1,006 metres or 3,301 feet). At its southern end is a hydroelectric dam, built in 1922.

Between the lake and the mountain, pass boulevard Talbot(or route 175), same as a highway rest area called L'Étape.

== Attractions ==
In this lake, you can fish for gray trout (lake trout).

There is also the "Petit lac Jacques-Cartier" (47.405785°N 71.529751°W). This is why we have long talked about the Great Jacques-Cartier Lake to distinguish it from the Small.

== Galerie ==
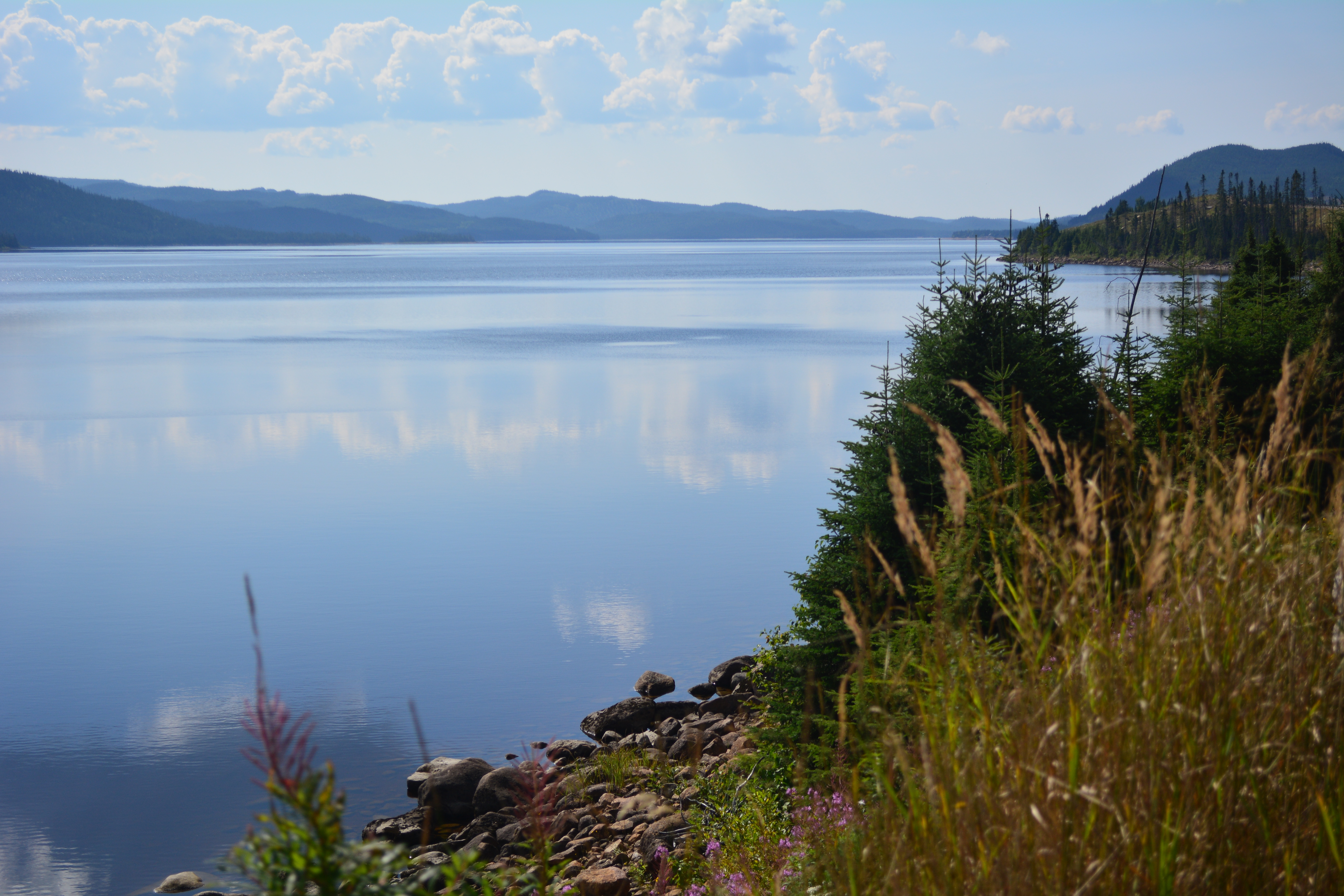
Viewpoint on the lake along Route 175

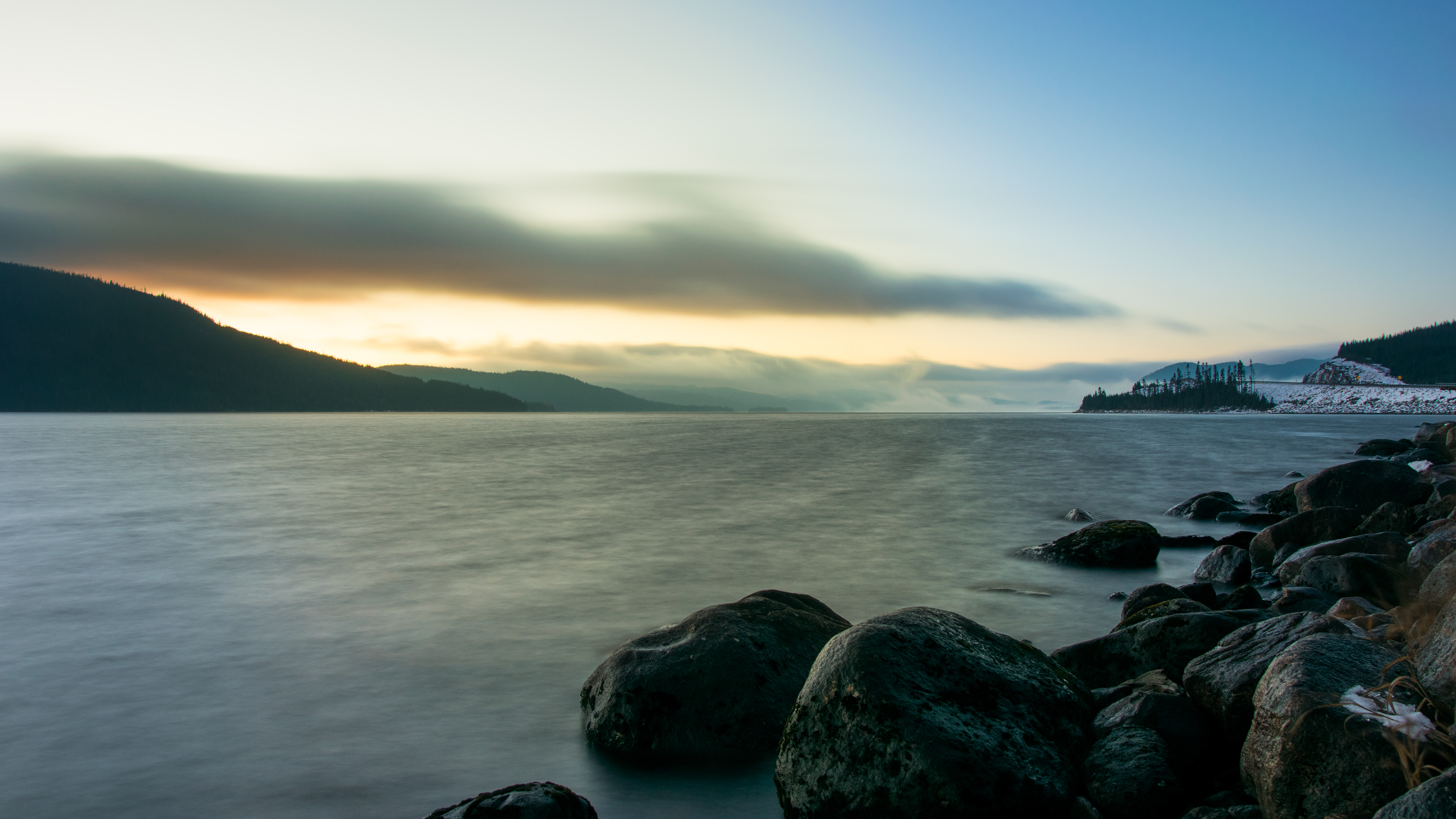
Jacques-Cartier Lake at sunrise

== Toponymy ==
Jacques Cartier (Saint-Malo, France, 1491 – Saint-Malo, 1557), explorer and navigator, made three trips to Canada between 1534 and 1542. He ventured to the New World in 1534, charged by François I to find gold and a passage to Asia. He explored the Anticosti Island, the Gulf of St. Lawrence and, on July 24, he erected a cross in the bay of Gaspé as a sign of 'appropriation of the premises. During his second journey, in 1535, Cartier went up the St. Lawrence River to Hochelaga (Montreal) and spent a difficult winter in Stadaconé (Quebec). Finally, in 1541, under the orders of Roberval, Cartier attempted to establish the first French colony in America. It attaches to the mouth of the Cap-Rouge river which it names Charlesbourg-Royal. Cartier left the colony in June 1542, while Roberval was on his way to Canada. They meet in Newfoundland, and Cartier chooses to return to Saint-Malo. First cartographer of the St. Lawrence, he recognized that the gold and diamonds found turned out to be iron pyrite and quartz.

The toponym "lac Jacques-Cartier" was formalized on December 5, 1968, by the Commission de toponymie du Québec.

== See also ==
- La Côte-de-Beaupré Regional County Municipality
- Lac-Jacques-Cartier, a TNO
- Laurentides Wildlife Reserve
- Jacques-Cartier River
- Lac Jacques-Cartier Massif
