= Nadreau Lake =

Lake in Quebec, Canada

- Location in Quebec
- Location: Lac-Jacques-Cartier (TNO), La Côte-de-Beaupré Regional County Municipality (MRC), Capitale-Nationale, Quebec, Canada
- Coordinates: 47.58583°N 71.07916°W
- Lake type: Natural
- Primary outflows: Jacques-Cartier River
- Basin countries: Canada
- Max. length: 1.8 km (1.1 mi)
- Max. width: 1.1 km (0.68 mi)
- Surface elevation: 838 m (2,749 ft)
- Islands: 3

The Nadreau Lake is a freshwater body located in the unorganized territory of Lac-Jacques-Cartier, in the La Côte-de-Beaupré Regional County Municipality, in the administrative region of Capitale-Nationale, in the province of Quebec, in Canada.

The hydrographic side of this lake is mainly served by a few forest roads for the needs of forestry and recreational tourism activities.

Because of its altitude, the surface of Lake Nadreau is generally frozen from the end of November to the beginning of April; however, safe circulation on the ice is generally done from mid-December to the end of March. The water level is controlled by a dam built at its mouth.

== Geography ==
Lake Nadreau is the head water body of the Jacques-Cartier River. This lake receives the waters on the west side of two small lakes: Plamondon lake (altitude: 844 metres (2,769 ft)) and an unnamed lake (862 metres (2,828 ft)). Lake Nadreau discharges 180 metres (590 ft) north into Lake Grandpré (altitude: 847 metres (2,779 ft)). The latter empties westwards into "Petit Pré lake" (440 metres (1,440 ft) long; altitude: 838 metres (2,749 ft)).

From the mouth of "Lac Petit Pré", the Jacques-Cartier River flows 15.6 kilometres (9.7 mi) northwest in the county of Montmorency to reach Jacques-Cartier Lake, which is the main body of water on the Jacques-Cartier River.

A mountain whose summit reaches 994 metres (3,261 ft) is located southwest of Lac Nadreau, and another of 993 metres (3,258 ft) on the west side. This forest area includes several swamps at several altitude levels: 813 metres (2,667 ft) to 847 metres (2,779 ft); especially around the lakes of Petit Pré, Grandpré, Gariépy, Étang des Silènes, Saulmer; as well as in the Malbaie River area, around Lac des Frelons and Lac des Sixty Six (this area seems to have 66 small lakes through swamps).

== Toponymy ==
The surname "Nadreau" is of French origin.

The toponym "Lac Nadreau" was formalized on December 5, 1968 at the Place Names Bank of the Commission de toponymie du Québec.

== See also ==
- Jacques-Cartier River
- Lac-Jacques-Cartier, an unorganized territory
- La Côte-de-Beaupré Regional County Municipality
- Capitale-Nationale, administrative region
