= L'Étape, Quebec =

L'Étape (La Loutre)
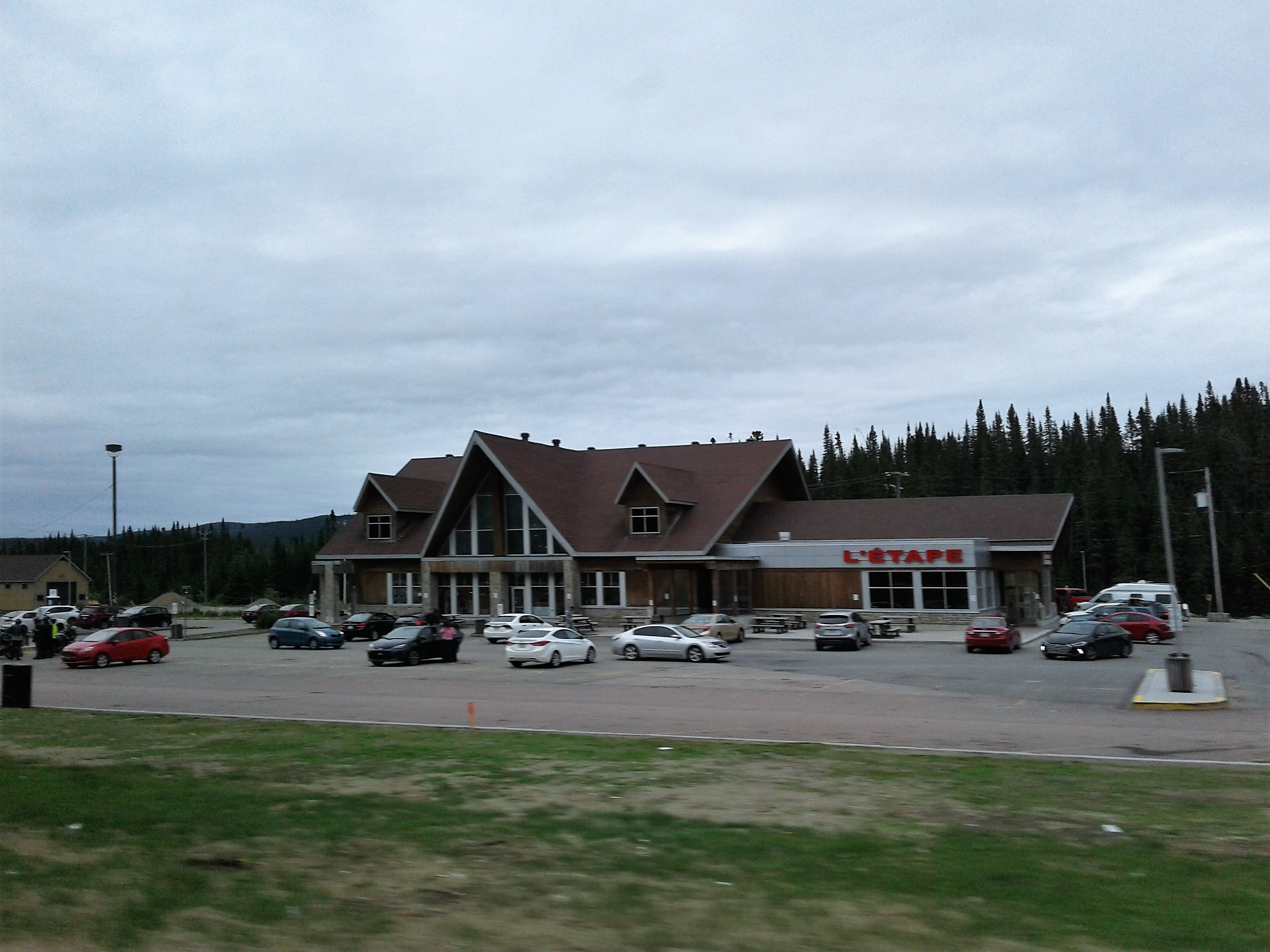
- L'Étape in 2018
- Interactive map of L'Étape (La Loutre)
- Location: Jacques-Cartier Lake, Quebec, Canada
- Coordinates: 47.5599°N 71.2274°W
- Elevation: 800 metres (2,600 ft)
- Type: Rest area
- Campsites: 108
- Facilities: Toilets, Restaurant, Cornerstore
- Operated by: Sépaq
- Established: 1869 (relay); 2006 (actual)

L'Étape (English: The Halt) is a rest area and a campground located on route 175 at km 135, on the shores on Jacques-Cartier Lake, halfway between Québec City and Saguenay. In the heart of the Laurentides Wildlife Reserve, where about 1.7 million pass through on a yearly basis.

== History ==
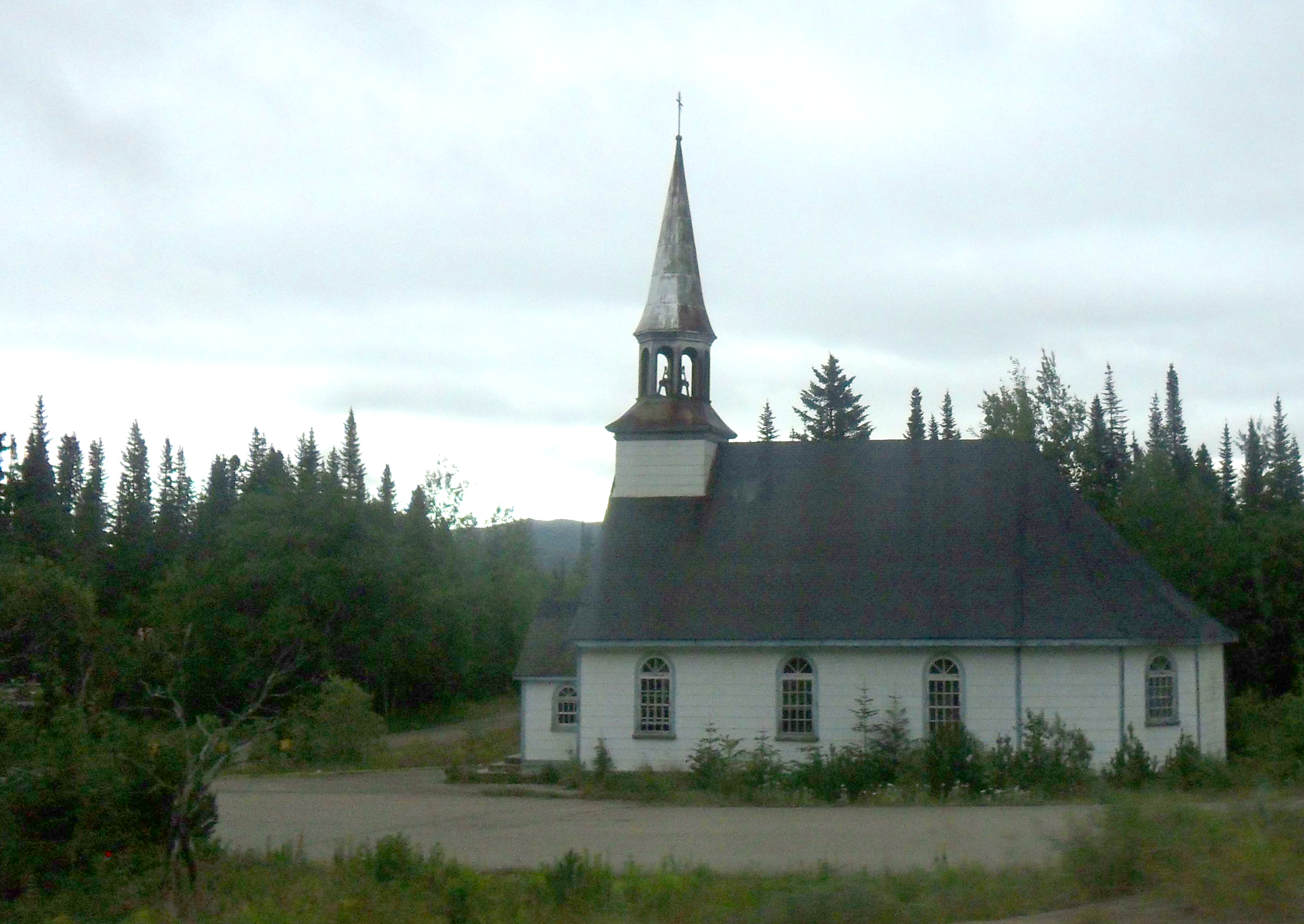
The Notre-Dame-de-L'Assomption chapel, near L'Étape, abandoned in 1989.

A first relay was built on this location in 1869. It was at that time only a wooden shack containing a bread oven. This type of relay was frequent in the region. Between the two world wars, L'Étape became the end of road 54 (now road 175) and a forest protection outpost was installed there. In 1951, the road was completed to Saguenay and the Quebec Government decided to build a hostel, a restaurant and a gas station to provide services to motorists and promote sport fishing the area. The hostel was later demolished in 1973 but the restaurant and gas station remain in operation to this day. In 1967, the Notre-Dame-de-L'Assomption chapel open its registers only to be abandoned shortly after in 1989.

L'Étape was completely burned down by a violent fire on 5 September 2003. Following the disaster, it was replaced by small dépanneur and rebuilt anew in 2006. On the night of 12 December 2007, the gas station was entirely destroyed by a fire. The main building housing the restaurant was not affected.

== Today ==
Currently, l'Étape provides motorists with such services as a restaurant, a depanneur, a Petro-Canada gas station that offers towing and boarding for workers. During the summer and fall season, the Sépaq's Laurentides Wildlife Reserve La Loutre registration center and campground is opened to visitors.

== Climate ==
Due to the high elevation, L'Étape experiences a subarctic climate (Köppen climate classification Dfc) with long, snowy winters and short summers. Since 1993, temperatures have ranged from 31.2 °C (88.2 °F) on 2 July 2002 to −44.7 °C (−48.5 °F) on 4 February 1996. The weather station is located at an elevation of 791 metres (2,595 ft).

Climate data for L'Étape (1993–2020 averages and extremes)
Month	Jan	Feb	Mar	Apr	May	Jun	Jul	Aug	Sep	Oct	Nov	Dec	Year
Record high °C (°F)	8.7 (47.7)	7.3 (45.1)	20.1 (68.2)	22.3 (72.1)	28.0 (82.4)	30.9 (87.6)	31.2 (88.2)	27.7 (81.9)	28.8 (83.8)	22.7 (72.9)	16.2 (61.2)	10.6 (51.1)	31.2 (88.2)
Mean daily maximum °C (°F)	−10.0 (14.0)	−8.2 (17.2)	−2.9 (26.8)	3.8 (38.8)	12.4 (54.3)	18.2 (64.8)	20.4 (68.7)	19.2 (66.6)	14.8 (58.6)	6.7 (44.1)	−0.3 (31.5)	−6.5 (20.3)	5.6 (42.1)
Daily mean °C (°F)	−16.3 (2.7)	−15.0 (5.0)	−9.8 (14.4)	−2.0 (28.4)	5.9 (42.6)	11.6 (52.9)	14.5 (58.1)	13.2 (55.8)	9.3 (48.7)	2.5 (36.5)	−4.4 (24.1)	−11.5 (11.3)	−0.2 (31.6)
Mean daily minimum °C (°F)	−22.6 (−8.7)	−21.7 (−7.1)	−16.7 (1.9)	−7.9 (17.8)	−0.6 (30.9)	5.0 (41.0)	8.5 (47.3)	7.2 (45.0)	3.8 (38.8)	−1.7 (28.9)	−8.5 (16.7)	−16.5 (2.3)	−6.0 (21.2)
Record low °C (°F)	−44.5 (−48.1)	−44.7 (−48.5)	−39.7 (−39.5)	−28.9 (−20.0)	−15.3 (4.5)	−4.7 (23.5)	0.0 (32.0)	−1.1 (30.0)	−7.0 (19.4)	−19.0 (−2.2)	−25.3 (−13.5)	−39.4 (−38.9)	−44.7 (−48.5)
Average precipitation mm (inches)	79.2 (3.12)	80.0 (3.15)	102.8 (4.05)	91.5 (3.60)	99.1 (3.90)	112.1 (4.41)	153.1 (6.03)	105.3 (4.15)	120.5 (4.74)	142.1 (5.59)	113.6 (4.47)	118.4 (4.66)	1,317.7 (51.88)
Average precipitation days (≥ 1 mm)	16.3	14.1	17.5	16.1	14.9	13.7	16.9	14.4	14.1	18.9	17.6	19.4	193.9
Source: Environment Canada
