= Tantaré Ecological Reserve =

Protected area in Quebec, Canada

Coordinates: 47.0694°N 71.5375°W

- IUCN category Ia (strict nature reserve)
- Interactive map of Tantaré Ecological Reserve
- Location: Saint-Gabriel-de-Valcartier, La Jacques-Cartier Regional County Municipality, Québec, Canada
- Established: March 1, 1978

Tantaré Ecological Reserve is an ecological reserve in Quebec, Canada. It was established on March 1, 1978.
