= Donnacona, Quebec =

Donnacona
- City
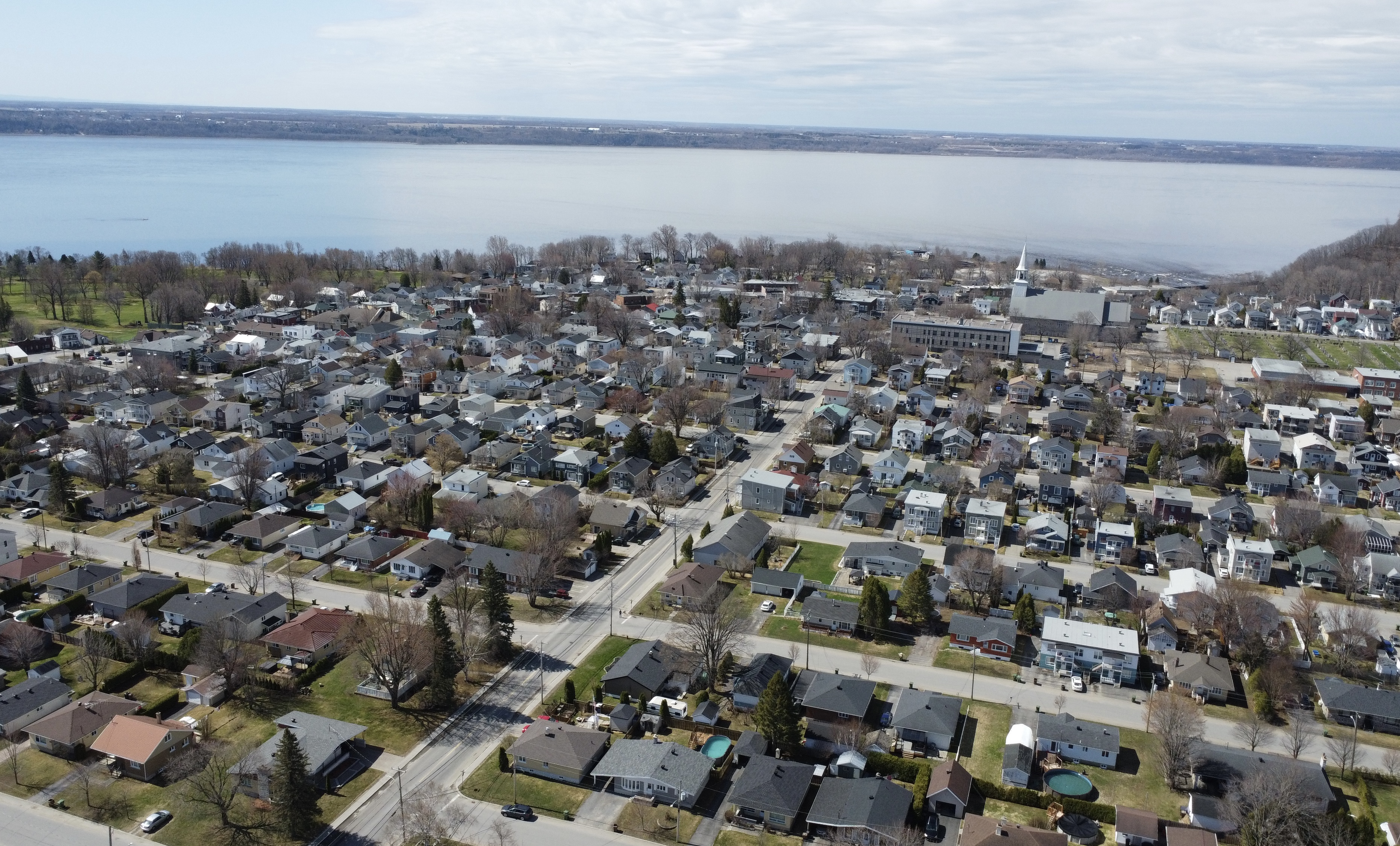

- Coat of arms
- Motto: Mets l'Épaule à la Roue (Put the shoulder to the wheel)
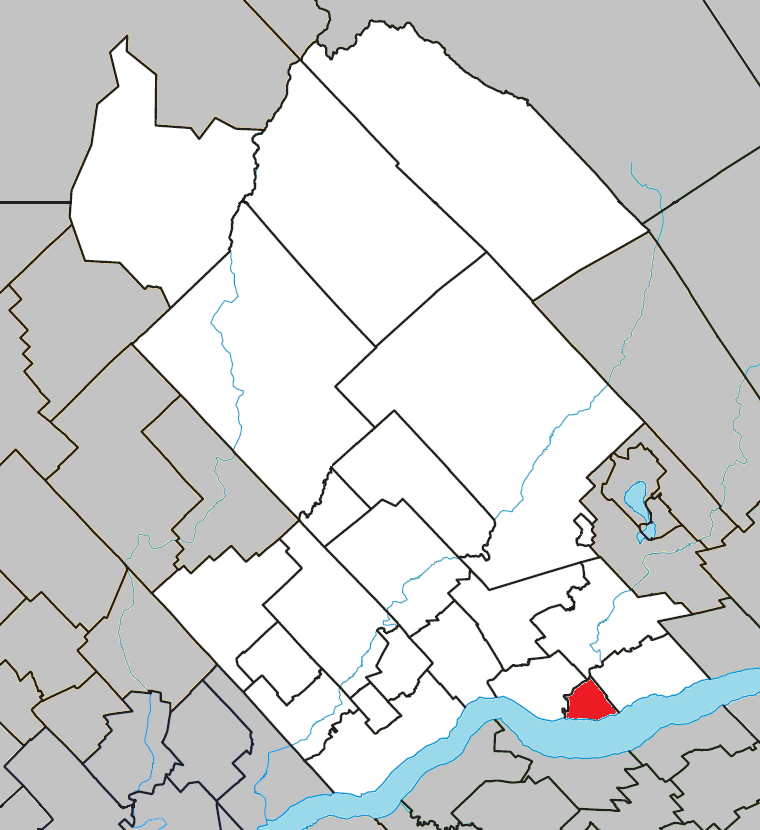
- Location within Portneuf RCM

- Location in central Quebec
- Coordinates: 46°40′29″N 71°43′46″W
- Country: Canada
- Province: Quebec
- Region: Capitale-Nationale
- RCM: Portneuf
- Constituted: 21 January 1967

Government
  - Mayor: Jean-Claude Léveillée
  - Fed. riding: Saint-Augustin—Portneuf—Jacques-Cartier
  - Prov. riding: Portneuf

Area
  - City: 37.42 km^{2} (14.45 sq mi)
  - Land: 20.20 km^{2} (7.80 sq mi)
  - Urban: 9.78 km^{2} (3.78 sq mi)

Population (2021)
  - City: 7,436
  - Density: 368.2/km^{2} (954/sq mi)
  - Urban: 8,952
  - Urban density: 915.1/km^{2} (2,370/sq mi)
  - Pop (2016-21): ▲3.3%
  - Dwellings: 3,410
- Time zone: UTC−5 (EST)
  - Summer (DST): UTC−4 (EDT)
- Postal code(s): G3M 1A1
- Area codes: 418 and 581
- Highways A-40: R-138
- Website: villededonnacona.com

Donnacona (French pronunciation: [dɔnakɔna]) is an industrial town located about 40 kilometres (25 mi) west of Quebec City in Portneuf County, Quebec, Canada.

== History ==
Some people believe the city was named after Donnacona, a 16th-century St. Lawrence Iroquois chief who was taken to France. The chieftain lived further down-river in Stadacona.

It was actually named after the first paper mill erected at the mouth of the Jacques-Cartier River, The Donnacona Paper Ltd. It was located where the Jacques-Cartier River meets the St. Lawrence River. The local paper mill played a key role in creating and quickly developing the local settlement to the point of making Donnacona the most populous urban town in Portneuf County. Economic difficulties affected the lumber and pulp and paper industry and the local factory was sold a number of times. In 2007, Bowater had a debt of $7 billion and merged with Abitibi-Consolidated. The merger was to sell off Abitibi's assets and close its mills for liquidity to settle Bowater's debt. It closed in January 2008. It had employed 240 people manufacturing of 230,000 tonnes per annum of commercial grade paper. The demolition was scheduled to take 12 to 14 months. For three years, the town unsuccessfully tried to find an entrepreneur to restart the industry. Demolition began in March 2011.

Prior to the chartering of Donnacona as a town in 1915, the area was named Pointe-aux-Écureuils. A New France Seigneurie existed under the name of Les Écureuils as a surrounding rural parish municipality prior to its final merge with Donnacona in 1967.

== Geography ==
The Jacques-Cartier River forms the north-western boundary of the municipality, flowing south-west to its mouth in the estuary of St. Lawrence. The Rivière aux Pommes crosses the centre of the municipality from east to west towards its confluence with the Jacques-Cartier River.

=== Climate ===
Donnacona has a humid continental climate with vast seasonal differences. Summers are mild and moderated by its proximity to the Gulf of Saint Lawrence. In winter, interior Canada influences the climate with frequent cold waves.

Climate data for Donnacona
Month	Jan	Feb	Mar	Apr	May	Jun	Jul	Aug	Sep	Oct	Nov	Dec	Year
Record high °C (°F)	11.0 (51.8)	15.0 (59.0)	18.3 (64.9)	29.0 (84.2)	33.3 (91.9)	34.5 (94.1)	35.0 (95.0)	34.0 (93.2)	34.0 (93.2)	26.1 (79.0)	22.5 (72.5)	14.0 (57.2)	35.0 (95.0)
Mean daily maximum °C (°F)	−7.6 (18.3)	−4.5 (23.9)	0.9 (33.6)	9.2 (48.6)	17.5 (63.5)	22.6 (72.7)	25.0 (77.0)	23.9 (75.0)	18.9 (66.0)	11.5 (52.7)	3.8 (38.8)	−3.1 (26.4)	9.8 (49.6)
Daily mean °C (°F)	−12.3 (9.9)	−9.6 (14.7)	−3.9 (25.0)	4.4 (39.9)	11.8 (53.2)	17.1 (62.8)	19.7 (67.5)	18.6 (65.5)	13.9 (57.0)	7.3 (45.1)	0.5 (32.9)	−6.8 (19.8)	5.1 (41.2)
Mean daily minimum °C (°F)	−17 (1)	−14.7 (5.5)	−8.7 (16.3)	−0.5 (31.1)	6.1 (43.0)	11.5 (52.7)	14.4 (57.9)	13.2 (55.8)	8.9 (48.0)	3.1 (37.6)	−2.8 (27.0)	−10.5 (13.1)	0.3 (32.5)
Record low °C (°F)	−37.8 (−36.0)	−37.2 (−35.0)	−31 (−24)	−18.9 (−2.0)	−6.7 (19.9)	0.0 (32.0)	3.3 (37.9)	0.6 (33.1)	−5 (23)	−10.6 (12.9)	−22.2 (−8.0)	−36 (−33)	−37.8 (−36.0)
Average precipitation mm (inches)	81.9 (3.22)	62.8 (2.47)	73.4 (2.89)	86.0 (3.39)	106.7 (4.20)	117.2 (4.61)	128.9 (5.07)	106.1 (4.18)	113.4 (4.46)	108.5 (4.27)	99.1 (3.90)	84.4 (3.32)	1,168.2 (45.99)
Average rainfall mm (inches)	20.9 (0.82)	14.3 (0.56)	31.7 (1.25)	77.5 (3.05)	106.6 (4.20)	117.2 (4.61)	128.9 (5.07)	106.1 (4.18)	113.4 (4.46)	107.8 (4.24)	77.6 (3.06)	26.4 (1.04)	928.3 (36.55)
Average snowfall cm (inches)	61.0 (24.0)	48.5 (19.1)	41.7 (16.4)	8.6 (3.4)	0.1 (0.0)	0 (0)	0 (0)	0 (0)	0 (0)	0.7 (0.3)	21.5 (8.5)	58.0 (22.8)	240.0 (94.5)
Average precipitation days (≥ 0.2 mm)	15.9	11.6	12.5	12.9	14.3	13.8	14.9	13.0	13.5	14.6	15.0	15.7	167.5
Average rainy days (≥ 0.2 mm)	2.1	2.4	5.3	11.5	14.1	13.8	14.9	13.0	13.5	14.3	10.7	3.6	119.3
Average snowy days (≥ 0.2 cm)	14.7	10.1	8.5	2.2	0.11	0	0	0	0	0.22	5.3	12.8	53.9
Source: Environment Canada

== Demographics ==
In the 2021 Census of Population conducted by Statistics Canada, Donnacona had a population of 7,436 living in 3,300 of its 3,410 total private dwellings, a change of 3.3% from its 2016 population of 7,200. With a land area of 20.2 km^{2} (7.8 sq mi), it had a population density of 368.1/km^{2} (953.4/sq mi) in 2021.

Historical census populations – Donnacona, Quebec

Year	Pop.	±%
1921	1,225	—
1931	2,631	+114.8%
1941	3,064	+16.5%
1951	3,663	+19.5%
1956	4,147	+13.2%
1961	4,812	+16.0%

Year	Pop.	±%
1966	4,815	+0.1%
1971	5,940	+23.4%
1976	5,800	−2.4%
1981	5,731	−1.2%
1986	5,435	−5.2%
1991	5,659	+4.1%

Year	Pop.	±%
1996	5,739	+1.4%
2001	5,479	−4.5%
2006	5,564	+1.6%
2011	6,283	+12.9%
2016	7,200	+14.6%
2021	7,436	+3.3%

Source: Statistics Canada

Mother tongue (2021):

- English as first language: 1.0%
- French as first language: 95.8%
- English and French as first languages: 0.9%
- Other as first language: 2.0%

== Economy ==
A Canadian National rail line through Donnacona borders the St. Lawrence. There is no rail station.

The Federal Correctional Service Canada maximum security Donnacona Institution is located along Route 138.

== Infrastructure ==
- Autoroute 40 passes through the town.

== Sister cities ==
Its sister city is Jarnac, France.

== Notable people ==
- Gérald Gallant, (May 5, 1950), a contract killer who admitted to committing 28 murders and 12 attempted murders between 1978 and 2003.
- Nicole Martin, singer-songwriter
