= Jacques-Cartier River =

River of Capitale-Nationale (Québec, Canada)

Jacques-Cartier River Rivière Jacques-Cartier
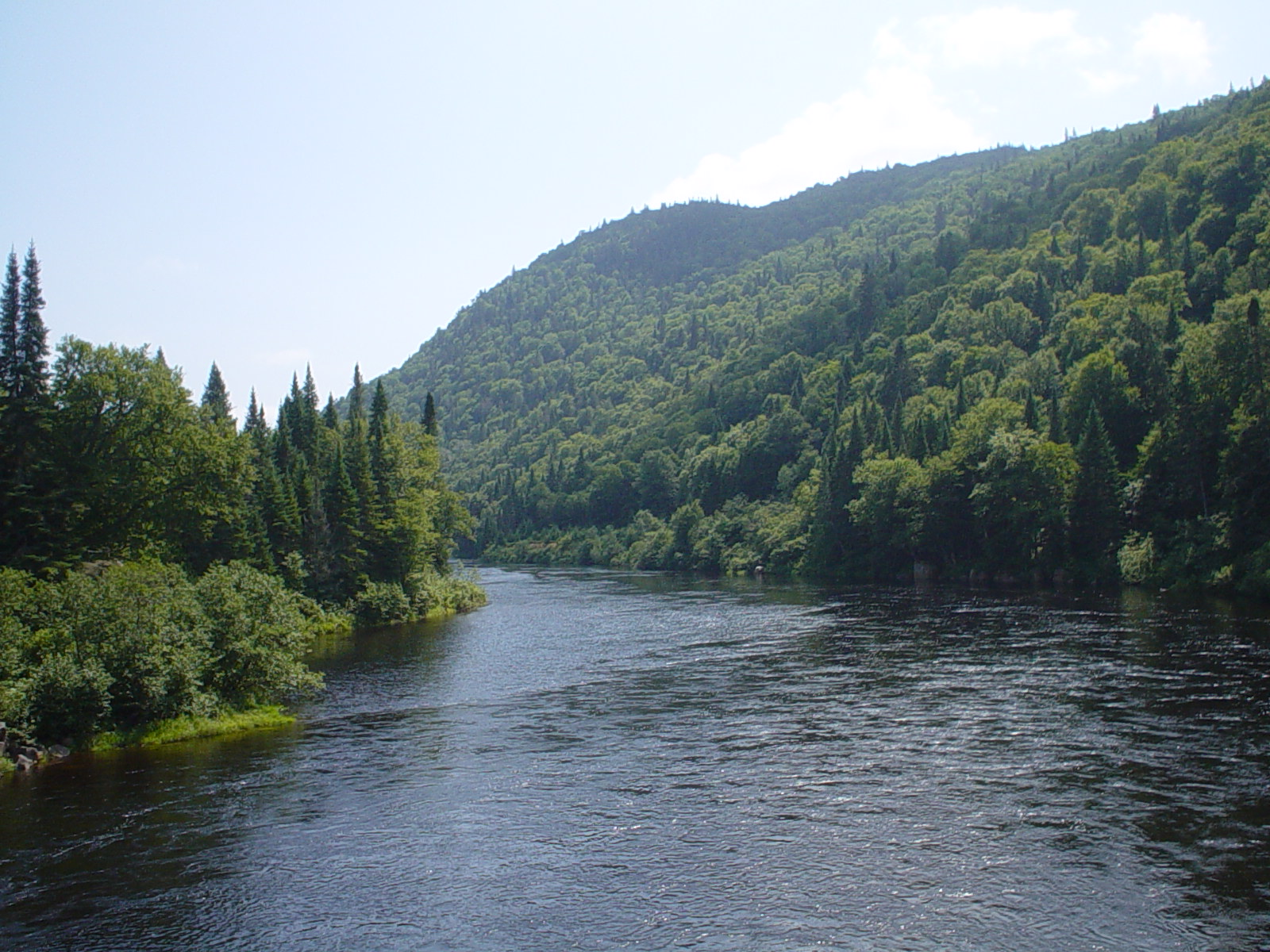
- The Jacques-Cartier River in the Jacques-Cartier National Park

Location
- Country: Canada
- Province: Quebec
- Region: Capitale-Nationale

Physical characteristics
- Source: Nadreau Lake
  - location: Lac-Jacques-Cartier
  - coordinates: 47.593115°N 71.081103°W
  - elevation: 842 m (2,762 ft)
- Mouth: Saint Lawrence River
  - location: Donnacona
  - coordinates: 46°40′17″N 71°44′50″W
  - elevation: 4 m (13 ft)
- Length: 161 km (100 mi)
- Basin size: 2,515 km^{2} (971 sq mi)

Basin features
- Tributaries
  - left: (Upward from the mouth) Rivière aux Pommes, cours d'eau Pageau, cours d'eau Faucher, décharge du lac Bonhomme, ruisseau Bonhomme, décharge du lac Ferré, décharge du lac Jacques, décharge du Lac des Ventres Rouges, ruisseau du Moulin, décharge du lac Hibou, rivière Cachée, rivière à l'Épaule, Sautauriski River, décharge du lac Pers, rivière du Malin, décharge du lac Lanoraye, décharge du lac Bouchard, décharge du lac Bossé, décharge du lac Laforest, décharge du lac Chartier, décharge du lac Bayon.
  - right: (Upward from the mouth) Ruisseau du Domaine, cours d'eau Lizotte, cours d'eau Dansereau, décharge du lac Jaro, décharge du lac Lesage, décharge du lac Frenette, ruisseau à l'Eau Froide, Ontaritzi River, décharge des lacs Griffin, Woodlock et Laurie, Cassian River, ruisseau Saint-Vincent, ruisseau Tintin, décharge du lac Gobeil, décharge des lacs Saurtney et Hartel, décharge du lac Larabelle, décharge du lac McLish, Cook River, décharge du lac Chalout, rivière Jacques-Cartier Nord-Ouest, décharge de l'étang Nicol, décharge des lacs Luc, Deslauriers et Brugnon, Launière River, décharge du lac Vaudry, décharge du lac Wabo, décharge du lac Beauséjour.

The Jacques-Cartier River is a river in the province of Quebec, Canada. It is 161 km long and its source is Jacques-Cartier Lake in Laurentides Wildlife Reserve, and flows in a predominantly southern direction before ending in the Saint Lawrence River at Donnacona, about 30 km upstream from Quebec City.

It is currently under nomination for Canadian Heritage River status.

Forestry is the main economic activity in the sector; recreational tourism, second; agriculture activities in lower part, third.

The surface of the Jacques-Cartier River (except the rapids areas) is usually frozen from the beginning of December to the end of March, however the safe circulation on the ice is generally done from end of December to the beginning of March.

== Geography ==
The Jacques-Cartier River drains an area of 2,515 square kilometres (971 sq mi), starting in and flowing for nearly 160 kilometres (99 mi) through the Laurentian Mountains in the geological region of Grenville (one of the youngest sections of the Canadian Shield, formed 955 million years ago), then flows through the sedimentary rocks of the St. Lawrence Lowlands for approximately 17 kilometres (11 mi), from the municipality of Pont-Rouge to its mouth.

The area covered by the drainage basin is for the most part undeveloped or protected, especially its source. In fact, 77% of its length is protected by the Laurentides Wildlife Reserve and the Jacques-Cartier National Park where one finds a steep glaciated valley formed during the last glaciation. Nevertheless, about 25,000 people live on the shores of this river close to its mouth, where it crosses the regional municipality of Portneuf and the municipalities of Tewkesbury, Saint-Gabriel-de-Valcartier, Shannon, Sainte-Catherine-de-la-Jacques-Cartier, Pont-Rouge and Donnacona.

Important tributaries of Jacques-Cartier river are:

- Rivière aux Pommes (English: Apple River)
- Sautauriski River
- Ontaritzi River
- Rivière à l'Épaule (English: Shoulder River)
- Cachée River (Jacques-Cartier River tributary) (English: Hidden River)
- Launière River
- Rivière Jacques-Cartier Nord-Ouest

=== Course of the river ===
The Nadreau Lake (elevation: 842 metres (2,762 ft)) constitutes the head water body of the Jacques-Cartier river. This lake receives the waters on the west side of two small lakes: Plamondon lake (elevation: 844 metres (2,769 ft)) and an unnamed lake (elevation: 862 metres (2,828 ft)). The mouth is located on the north bank. From the mouth of Nadreau Lake, the Jacques-Cartier river flows on 110.1 kilometres (68.4 mi) with a drop of 858 metres (2,815 ft) according to the following segments:

Upper course of Jacques-Cartier River (segment of 27.6 kilometres (17.1 mi))

From the mouth of Nadreau Lake, the Jacques-Cartier river flows towards the northwest in the county of Montmorency to reach Jacques-Cartier Lake. In this course, the river descends on:

- 1.6 kilometres (0.99 mi) westward into Lake Grandpré (length: 1.3 kilometres (0.81 mi); elevation: 847 metres (2,779 ft)) and along 440 metres (1,440 ft) into "Lac Petit Pré" (length: 1.3 kilometres (0.81 mi); elevation: 838 metres (2,749 ft)) to its mouth;
- 1.6 kilometres (0.99 mi) westward, to the discharge waters of Currier Lake (elevation: 886 metres (2,907 ft)) and Fantôme Lake (elevation: 960 metres (3,150 ft));
- 6.5 kilometres (4.0 mi) westward, to the outlet of Lakes Nissard (elevation: 841 metres (2,759 ft) coming from south) and Durue (elevation: 894 metres (2,933 ft), coming from North);
- 1.2 kilometres (0.75 mi) westward, to the outlet of Asselin, “du Vison” and Gaudreau lakes;
- 4.0 kilometres (2.5 mi) westwards receiving from the north the outlet of an unnamed stream, to the outlet (coming from south-east) of Joyal and Beauvais lakes;
- 2.1 kilometres (1.3 mi) southwesterly, to Jacques-Cartier Lake, which is the main body of water in the Jacques-Cartier river;
- 10.6 kilometres (6.6 mi) south across Jacques-Cartier Lake (elevation: 783 metres (2,569 ft)) over its full length to its mouth;

Intermediate course of the Jacques-Cartier river (downstream of Jacques-Cartier Lake) (segment of 22.3 kilometres (13.9 mi))

- 5.0 kilometres (3.1 mi) to the south, forming a hook to the west to cross the southern part of Lac Sept Îles, Lac Noir and Lac Lafontaine, to its mouth;
- 7.8 kilometres (4.8 mi) to the south, then southwest to the confluence of the Launière River (coming from the north)
- 9.5 kilometres (5.9 mi) southwards in a deep valley to the outlet (coming from the west) of the rivière Jacques-Cartier Nord-Ouest;

Intermediate course of the Jacques-Cartier river (downstream of the Jacques-Cartier North-West river) (segment of 38.8 kilometres (24.1 mi))

- 5.5 kilometres (3.4 mi) to the south by collecting the confluence of the Cook River, up to the outlet (coming from the south) of Lac McLish;
- 7.6 kilometres (4.7 mi) towards the south-east, collecting at the end of the segment the confluence of the Sautauriski River (coming from the east) to the confluence of the rivière Jacques-Cartier Nord-Ouest (coming from the north);
- 4.9 kilometres (3.0 mi) south-east then south to the confluence of the Cachée River (Jacques-Cartier River tributary) (coming from the east);
- 10.4 kilometres (6.5 mi) to the south, then the southwest by forming two large curves until the confluence of the Cassian River (coming from the west);
- 10.4 kilometres (6.5 mi) towards the south-east, by forming a loop towards the east, then towards the south, until the bridge of the village of Valcartier;

Lower course of the Jacques-Cartier river (downstream from Valcartier) (segment of 21.4 kilometres (13.3 mi))

- 5.7 kilometres (3.5 mi) first towards the south, then towards the southwest, up to the bridge in the village of Sainte-Catherine-de-la-Jacques-Cartier;
- 7.1 kilometres (4.4 mi) towards the south by forming a hook towards the east while crossing an agricultural zone, until the railway bridge in the village of Pont-Rouge;
- 7.0 kilometres (4.3 mi) to the south, forming two loops to the east in the agricultural and forestry zone, to the Pont de l’autoroute 40;
- 1.6 kilometres (0.99 mi) towards the south by forming a loop towards the northwest, to its mouth.

== Flood zones ==
The main flood zones of the Jacques-Cartier river are in the cities of Sainte-Catherine-de-la Jacques-Cartier, Shannon, Saint-Gabriel-de-Valcartier, Stoneham-et-Tewkesbury, Donnacona (Parc familial des Berges, south of route 138) and Pont-Rouge (upstream from rue Dupont, east of boulevard NotreDame, and on rue Auclair, in the Grand Remous sector).

== History ==
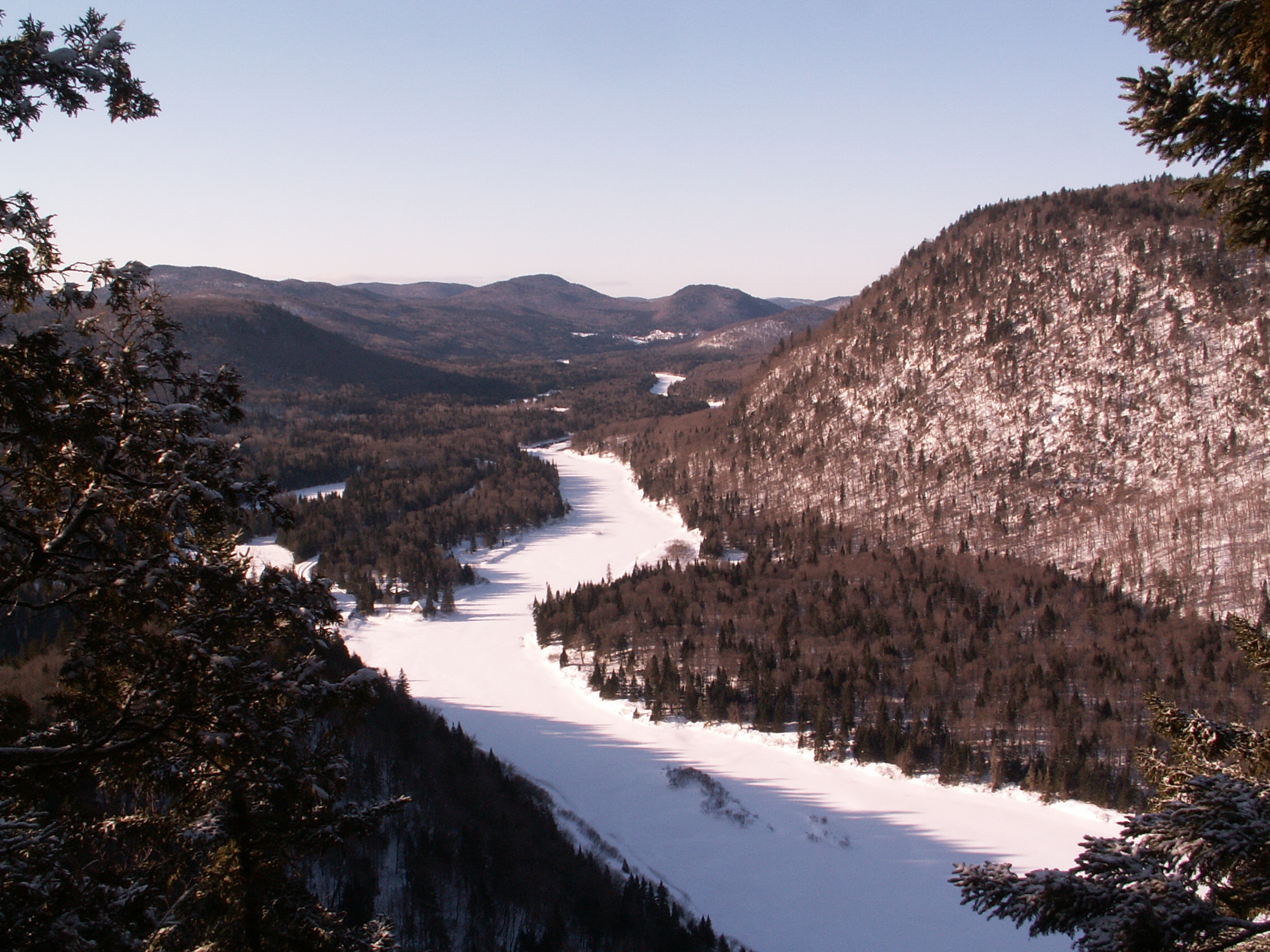
Downstream view in winter from de l'Épaule hill, Jacques-Cartier National Park.

The reports that according to surveyor John Adams, in 1829, the river was known by the Hurons as Lahdaweoole, meaning "coming from far". They and the Montagnais used its shores for fishing and trapping. It is estimated that this region has been used by First Nations for over 7,000 years. Explorer Samuel de Champlain mentioned this river in 1632 as the "Sturgeon and Salmon River". In 1656, a map of Samson of Abbeville showed "R. J. Quartier" as the river's designation, probably so named according to the popular belief that Jacques Cartier had passed by the river's mouth. This natural highway was used among others by Jesuit missionaries to reach the Lac Saint-Jean area during the 17th century.

Logging in the Laurentian highlands became an important economic activity during the second half of the 18th century. The Jacques-Cartier River was used for log drives to transport the logs to the Saint-Lawrence River and to the mills downstream. This practice was only stopped in 1975. With the settlement of French immigrants near the river's mouth came the formation of townships (modelled after English townships after their conquest of 1759) and new industries appeared such as flour mills.

In 1895 the Laurentian Wildlife Reserve was created to provide fishing, hunting, and recreation opportunities for the people. From 1918 on, the construction of fishing camps made fishing more and more popular. The end of the First World War and the construction of nearby roads to Lac Saint-Jean also contributed to this popularity. Then hydro-electric dams started to be built, taking advantage of the river's geography up until the 1970s. In 1972, a proposed Hydro-Québec project would have flooded the Jacques-Cartier River valley, but the project was strongly opposed by the population. The government reversed its decision and in 1981 Jacques-Cartier Park was created out of the wildlife reserve as a 671 km^{2} (259 sq mi) conservation park, accessible to the public for nature interpretation and nature friendly recreation activities.

== Flora and fauna ==
The river bank is typically mixed forest, consisting of yellow birch and sugar maple, whereas the surrounding areas show rather the boreal forest rich in conifers, in particular the black spruce. This distinction is clearly visible in the steeper sections of the valley where a milder microclimate prevails.

The fauna therefore is typical of a Canadian mixed forest. One can find in the Jacques-Cartier River valley the American black bear, bobcat, common raccoon, gray wolf, river otter, porcupine, moose, white-tailed deer, and caribou; in all 23 species of mammals. There are 104 species of birds, including birds of prey such as the barred owl, American kestrel, and osprey. Finally, there are 16 species of fish, of which brook trout in particular can be found frequently. In addition, a reintroduction program has been established for Atlantic salmon, which disappeared from the river in the 19th century.

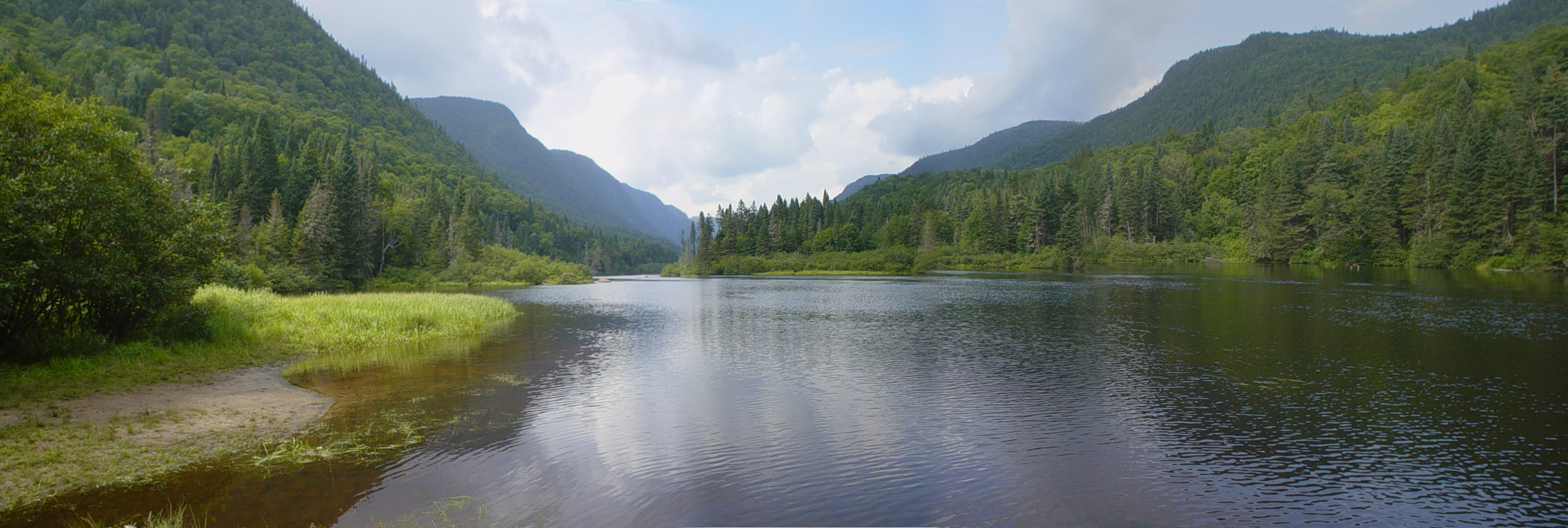

== See also ==
- Jacques-Cartier National Park
- Zec de la Rivière-Jacques-Cartier
- Municipality of Donnacona,
- La Jacques-Cartier Regional County Municipality
- Portneuf Regional County Municipality
- Capitale-Nationale
- Saint-Joseph Lake
- Jacques-Cartier Lake
- Nadreau Lake
- List of rivers of Quebec
