= Laurentides Wildlife Reserve =

Wildlife reserve in Quebec, Canada

Réserve faunique des laurentides
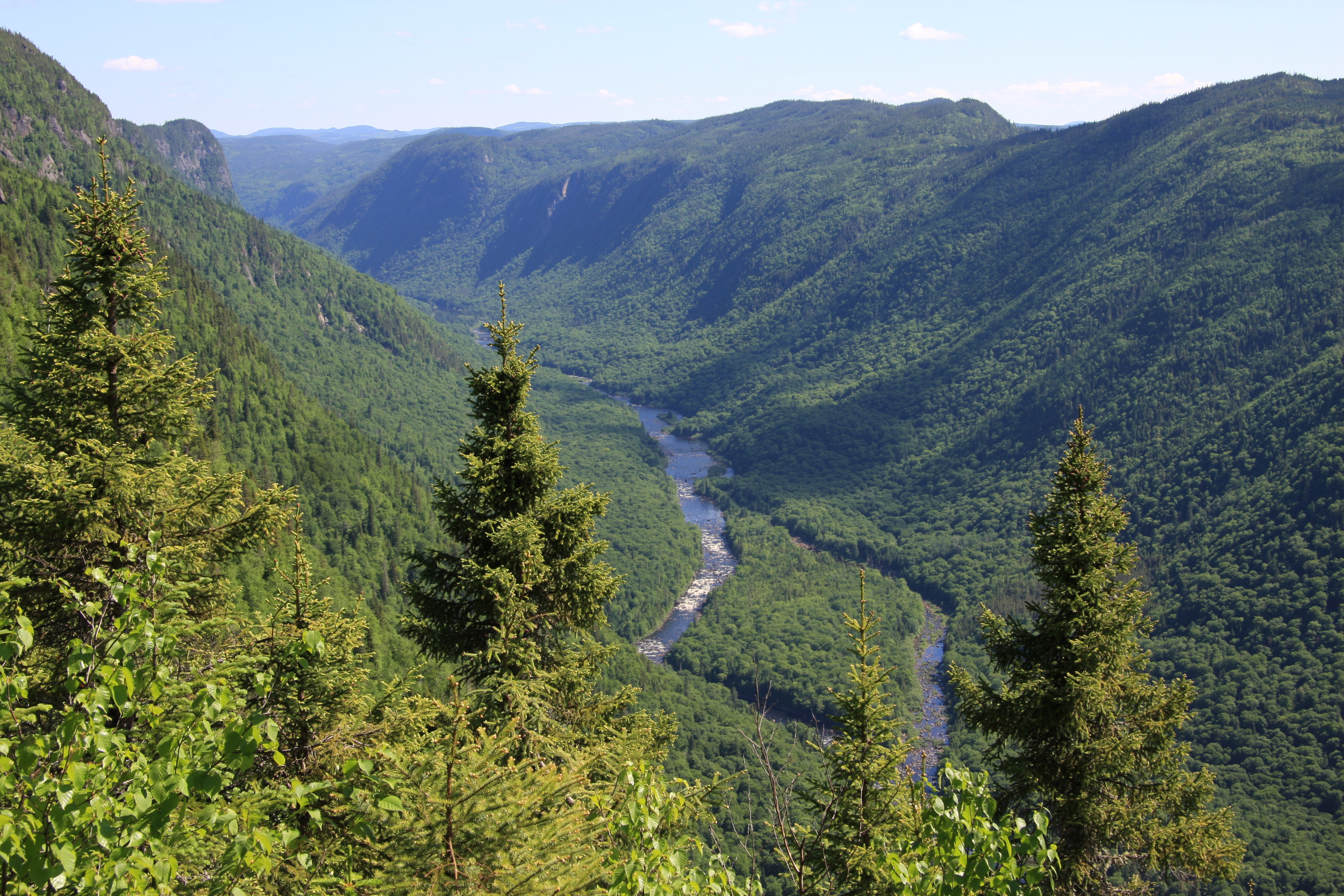
- View of the Jacques-Cartier River valley

- Location within Quebec
- Location: Canada, Quebec
- Nearest city: Quebec City, Saguenay, Quebec, Charlevoix Regional County Municipality; La Côte-de-Beaupré Regional County Municipality; La Jacques-Cartier Regional County Municipality; La Tuque; Le Fjord-du-Saguenay Regional County Municipality; Lac-Saint-Jean-Est Regional County Municipality
- Coordinates: 47°45′00″N 71°15′00″W
- Area: 7,861 km^{2} (3,035 sq mi)
- Established: 1895
- Governing body: Sépaq
- Administrator: Ministère des ressources naturelles et de la faune Sépaq
- Website: www.sepaq.com/rf/lau/fr/

Réserve faunique des Laurentides (transl. Laurentides Wildlife Reserve), also known by its former name of parc des Laurentides, is a wildlife reserve in Quebec, Canada, located between Quebec City and the Saguenay–Lac-Saint-Jean region. This reserve is part of the network of wildlife reserves of Quebec (Canada) managed by the Ministry of Energy and Natural Resources (Quebec) and the Société des établissements de plein air du Québec. It is located halfway between Saguenay and Quebec.

The territory of the reserve (7,861 square kilometres (3,035 sq mi)) has over 2000 lakes and many summits of over 1000 meters. The reserve is known by outdoor enthusiasts for hunting and fishing.

== History ==
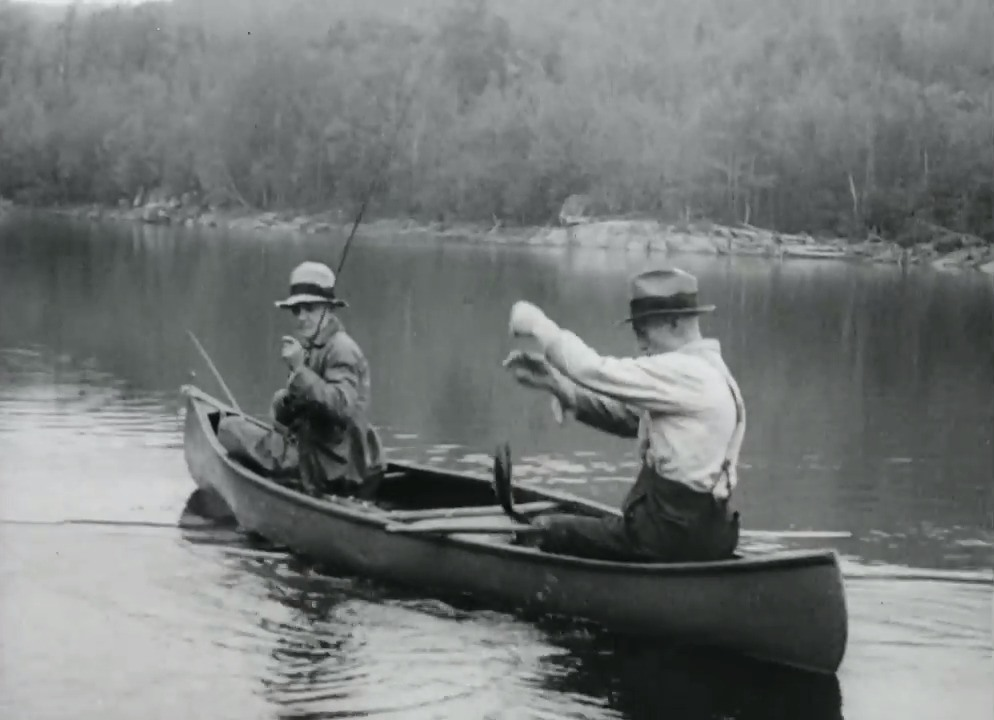
The Pikauba River, in 1940.

Parc des Laurentides was created in 1895 as a forest reserve and as a recreational area for the public. In 1981, two large parcels were split off to become Jacques-Cartier National Park in the south and the Grands-Jardins National Park in the east, while the remaining territory was established as a wildlife reserve.

The Jesuit trail, the first road to cross the sector, was cleared in 1676 and linked Quebec to lac Saint-Jean in three days via Saint-Charles Lake, the valley of the Jacques-Cartier River to Jacques-Cartier Lake, the Pikauba River, the rivière aux Écorces and the Métabetchouane River.

The first more or less passable road, the "road of Quebec" allows from 1881 to connect Hébertville to Lac Saint-Jean in Quebec in 40 hours. A branch to Chicoutimi was built in 1882. The reserve was created in 1895 under the name of "Parc des Laurentides".

In 1944 and 1945, survey work enabled the current road to be put in place, the route 175, inaugurated in 1948. The park being of limited access, there were barriers at the three entrances to the road to check the comings and goings. These barriers will be removed in 1977. At the center of the route, there is a rest area called L'Étape, located on the shores of Jacques-Cartier Lake, and the Provincial Police. After a fire, they will be demolished in 2005. In 2009, there is an old chapel, several chalets, a reconstructed franchise restaurant, the Patrouille Secours post (a special unit of the Transports Québec specializing in the extrication of vehicles involved in accidents in the wildlife reserve), an ambulance vehicle and a CTAQ barracks.

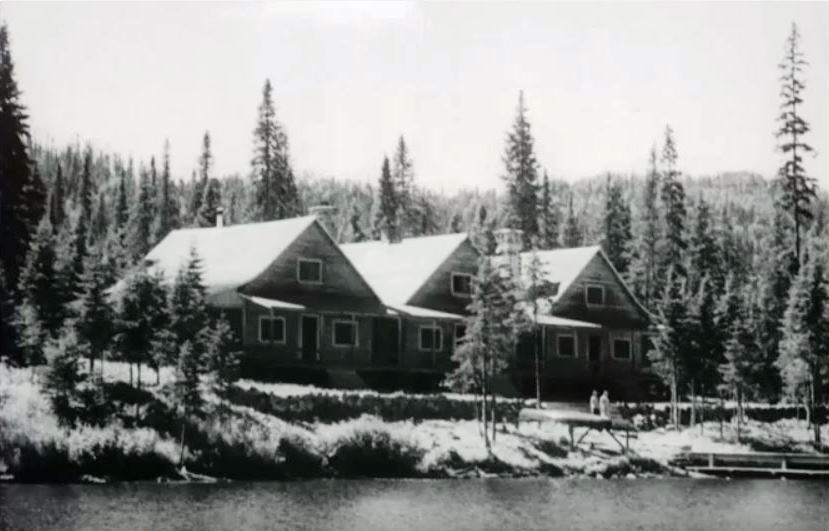
Portes-de-l'Enfer, in 1940.

In July 1952, a Pinetree Line radar station was established at Mont Apica, in the center of the reserve, as part of the establishment of a line of defense of North America against bombers from the Soviet Union. The radar station was officially closed in 1993.

In 1981, the reserve was cut from two portions of its territory at its southern border and its eastern border to allow the creation, respectively, of Jacques-Cartier National Park and Grands-Jardins National Park.

The traditional practice of moose hunting among Native communities is the cause of disputes between the Hurons-Wendat and the Montagnais of Mashteuiatsh.

== Geography ==
As its name suggests, the reserve is included in the Laurentian Mountains range, and more particularly the Jacques-Cartier Massif. It is essentially mountainous territory, the highest peak of which, Mount Belle Fontaine, culminates at 1151 m.

The 7,861 kilometres (4,884.60 mi) wildlife reserve is located in the regions of Capitale-Nationale, Saguenay–Lac-Saint-Jean and Mauricie. It shares its limits with the zec Mars-Moulin to the northeast, the zec des Martres and the Grands-Jardins National Park to the east, the Jacques-Cartier National Park to the south, the zec Batiscan-Neilson to the west, the Zec de la Rivière-Blanche to the west and the zec Kiskissink to the north-west. The reserve also encloses the ecological reserves Thomas-Fortin and Victor-A.-Huard. A part to the east of the reserve is part of the Charlevoix Biosphere Reserve.

== Natural heritage ==
=== Vegetation ===
Parc des Laurentides is part of the boreal forest. There are mainly firs, spruces and white birches. The bioclimatic domain varies according to altitude, from balsam fir to yellow birch further south, going up to certain places to black spruce-cladonia on certain dry summits.

=== Fauna ===
Insects, mammals, birds and fish live together in Réserve faunique des Laurentides.

==== Insects ====
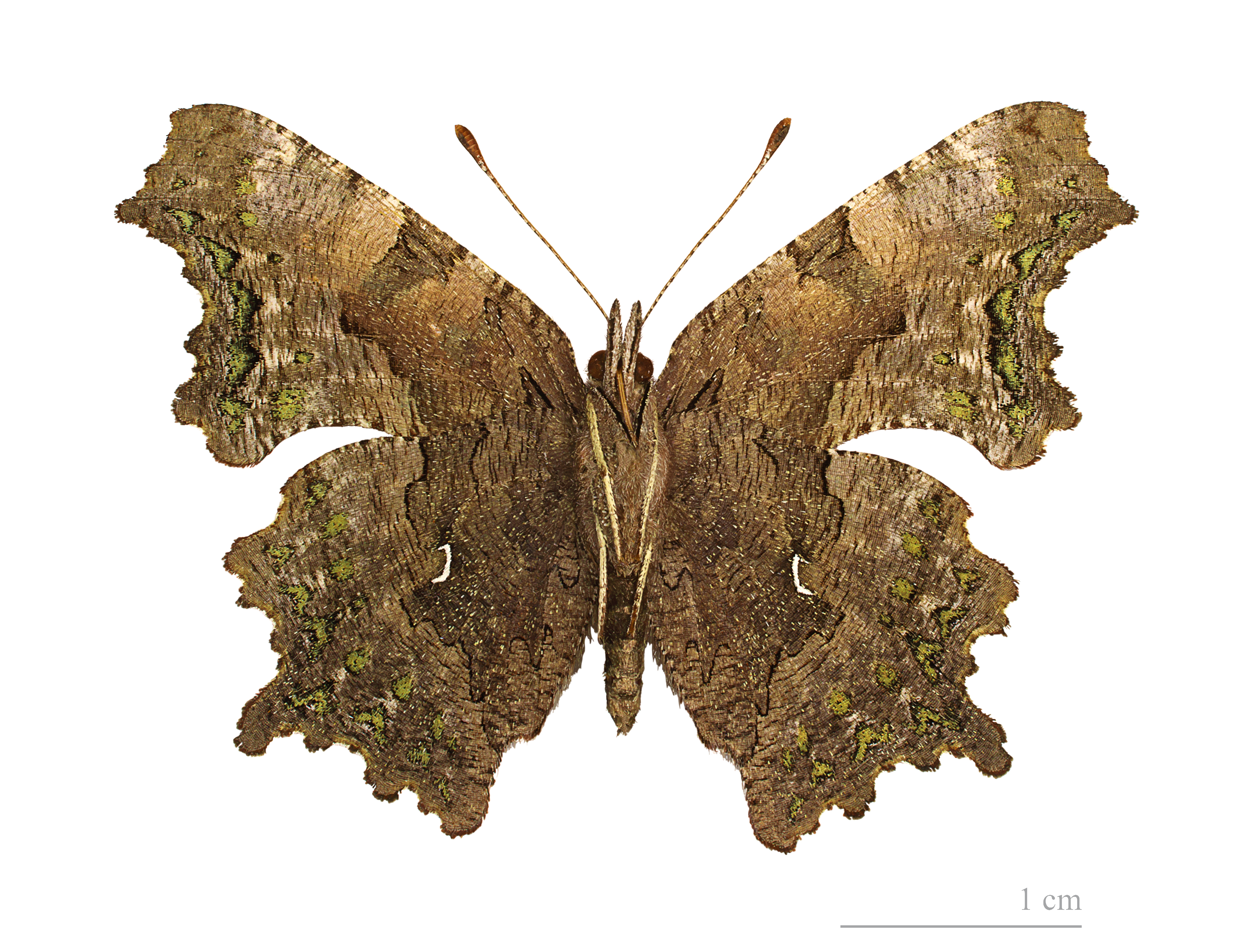
Polygonia faunus - Toulouse Museum, collected at Camp Mercier

- Polygon with green spots (Polygonia faunus)
- Histeridae (Mylabris quadripunctata)

==== Mammals ====
- Woodland Caribou (reintroduced in the 60s and 70s after the destruction of the original herd)
- Beaver
- Cougar s (increasingly seen in certain specific sectors)
- Snowshoe Hare
- Wolves
- Canada Lynx
- American marten
- Moose
- Black bear
- Pékans (in some areas) (Fishers)
- Porcupines
- Foxes

==== Birds ====
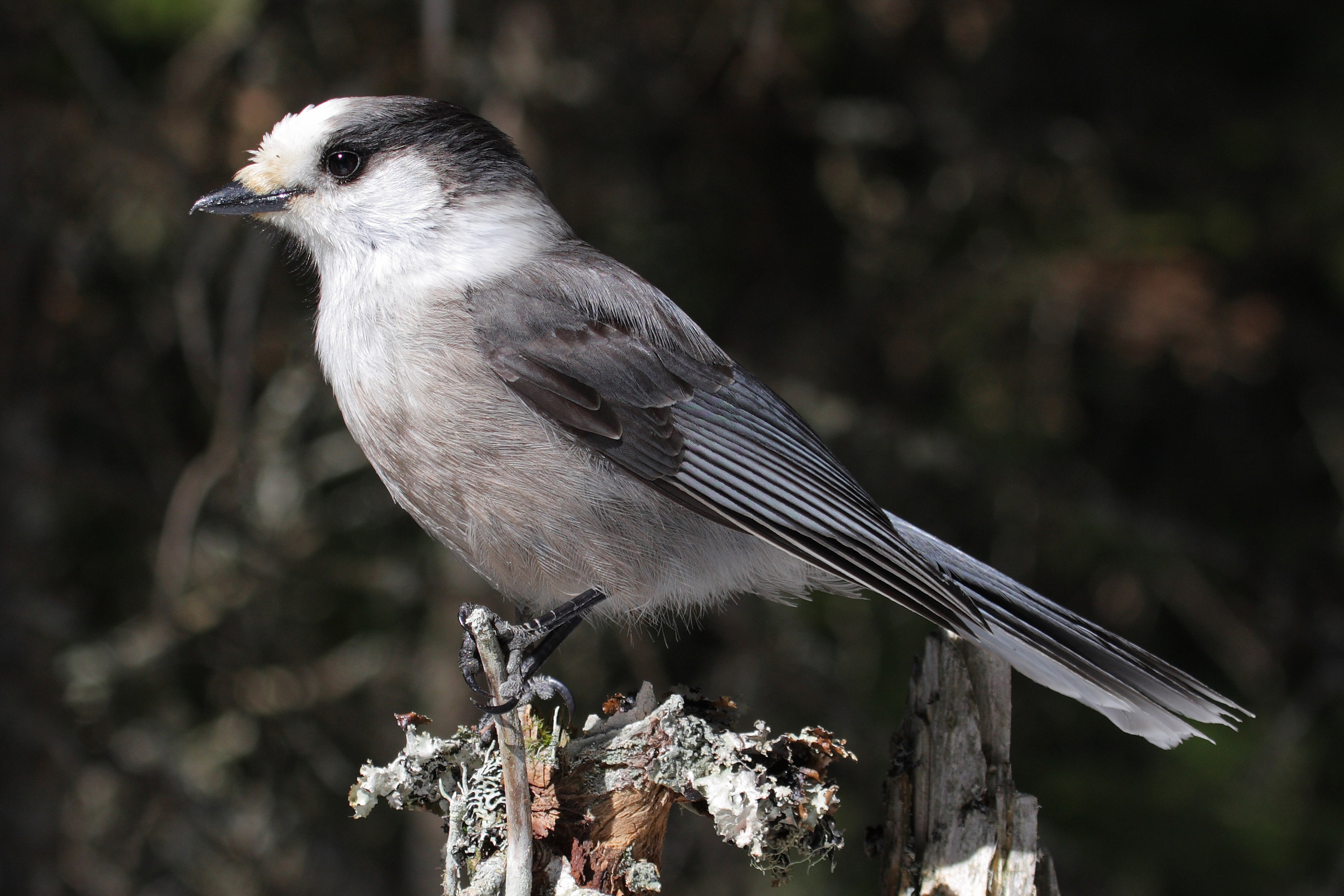
Canada Jay

- Ruffed grouse
- Heron
- Common loon
- Spruce Grouse

==== Fish ====
- Char
- Ouananiche (landlocked salmon)
- Brook trout
- Touladi (lake trout)

== Activities and facilities ==
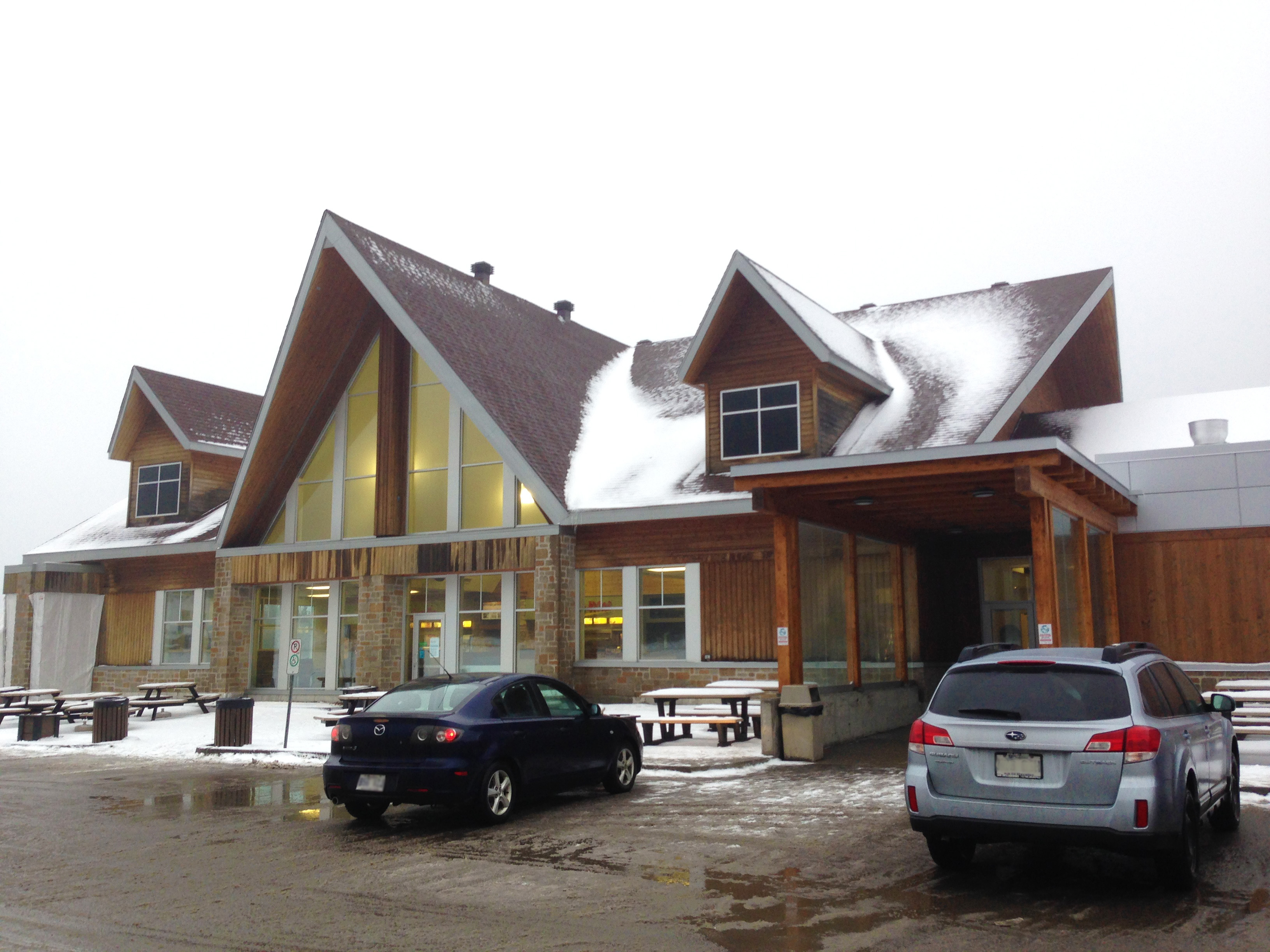
L'Étape

In the middle of the Réserve faunique des Laurentides, on the shores of Jacques-Cartier Lake and on Route 175, we find L'Étape, a rest area with food and refuelling Facilities. This stopover is the only one between Stoneham and Hébertville (Lac-Saint-Jean) or Saguenay.

Nearby, there is a rescue patrol station (extrication clamps) as well as an ambulance station. There is also the La Loutre reception center with its chalets and several camping pitches with or without services.

Camp Mercier is located at km 94 of Route 175. It has a reception centre with 14 cabins, food, first aid and equipment rental service. You can practice fishing, small and big game hunting, cross-country skiing, snowshoeing and snowmobiling depending on the season on the provincial snowmobile trail only.

== Access ==
The reserve, often called "the park" by locals, is split in half by route 175, linking the cities of Quebec and Saguenay. Route 169 leads to Hebertville, the main entrance to the Lac St-Jean area.

The route 175, named Boulevard Talbot in honor of Antonio Talbot, Member of Parliament for Chicoutimi and Minister of Roads under Maurice Duplessis, crosses the wildlife reserve between the city of Quebec, on the one hand, and the cities of Saguenay and Hébertville, on the other hand. It is a road which had, depending on the sector, one or two lanes in each direction.

Significant work was undertaken in 2006 and was completed in 2012, the road now has two lanes in each direction.

The year 2020 was the 125th anniversary of the Laurentides Wildlife Reserve.
