= Jacques-Cartier National Park =

National park in Quebec, Canada

Parc national de la Jacques-Cartier
- IUCN category II (national park)
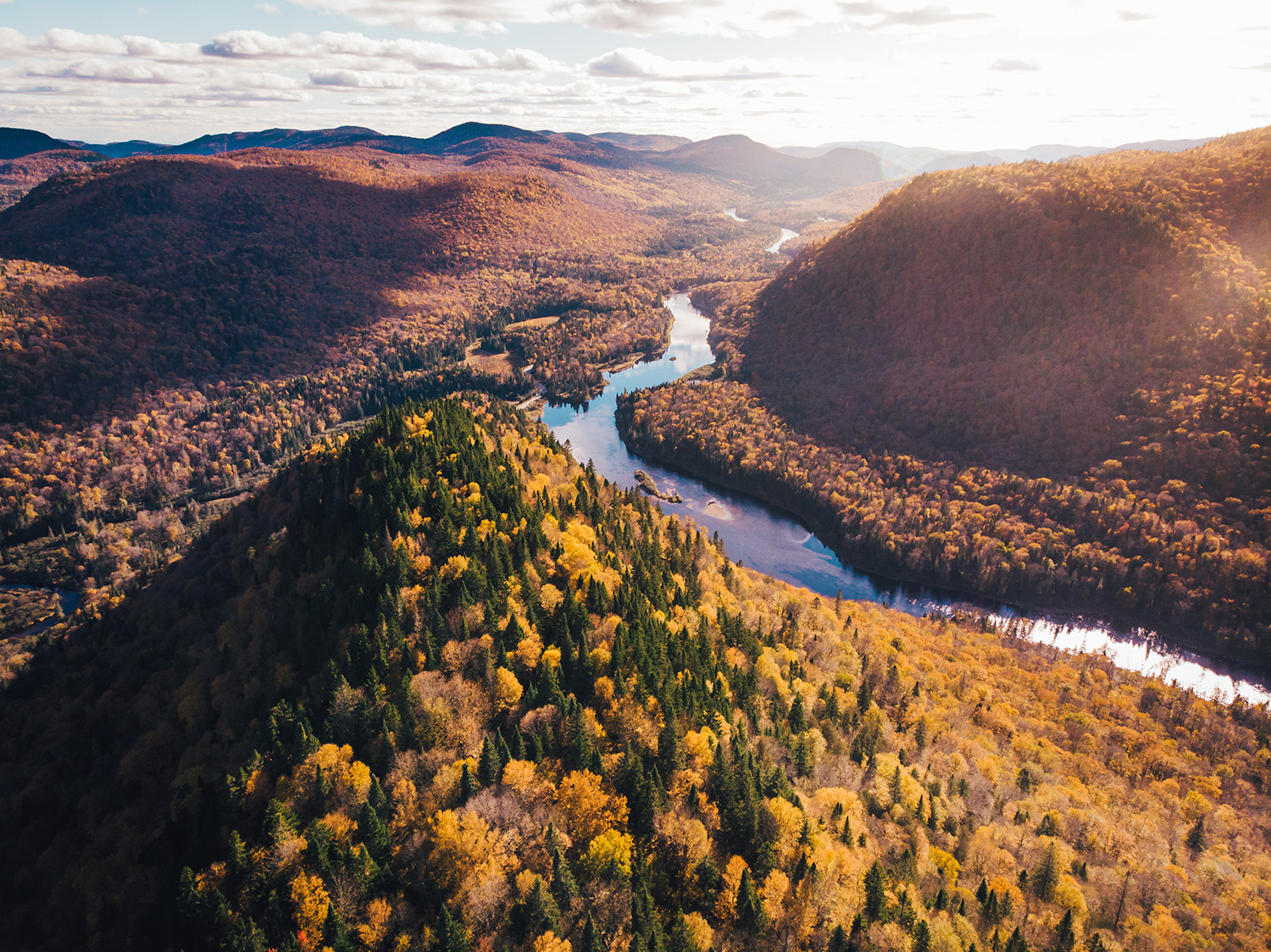
- View of the Jacques-Cartier River valley in October

- Location within Quebec
- Interactive map of Parc national de la Jacques-Cartier
- Location: La Jacques-Cartier and La Côte-de-Beaupré RCMs, Quebec, Canada
- Nearest city: Quebec City
- Coordinates: 47°20′00″N 71°21′00″W
- Area: 670 km^{2}
- Established: November 25, 1981
- Governing body: Sépaq

Jacques-Cartier National Park (French: Parc national de la Jacques-Cartier, pronounced [paʁk nɑsjɔnal də la ʒak kaʁtje]) is a provincial park located 50 kilometres (31 mi) north of Quebec City. The park aims to protect wildlife in the Laurentian massif. It lies within the Eastern forest-boreal transition ecoregion.

== History ==
The Innu (Montagnais) and the Wendat (Huron) peoples used to inhabit lands that currently make up Jacques-Cartier National Park. During the 17th century, Hurons worked as guides for Jesuits who wanted to travel between Quebec City and Lac Saint-Jean without using the St. Lawrence River.

Starting in the mid-19th century, the area was a major producer of lumber. Due to pressure from the American conservationist movement, the Laurentian Wildlife Reserve, whose lands the park was formed from, was created in 1895. The end of World War II, as well as improved road networks, brought in a considerable increase in the number of visitors to the area. In 1972, Hydro-Québec proposed building a dam on the Jacques-Cartier river, which would have resulted in flooding the valley. Due to public pressure, the project was abandoned in 1975. That same year also saw the end of the lumber industry in the region. In 1981, Jacques-Cartier National Park was created from the southernmost lands of the Laurentian Wildlife Reserve.

== Geography and geology ==
Jacques-Cartier National Park is located in the Laurentian Mountains along the Jacques-Cartier River valley, to the west of Quebec Route 175. Jacques-Cartier is a 30 minutes drive from Québec City. Grands-Jardins National Park is located to the northeast of the park, while the Laurentian Wildlife Reserve is located to the north. The park is also located near the Canadian Forces military base CFB Valcartier.

The park contains several glacial landforms such as drumlins and moraine. The most prominent glacial landform in Jacques-Cartier National Park is the Jacques-Cartier Valley (French:Vallée de la Jacques-Cartier). The U-shaped valley is 550 metres (1,804 ft) deep and was formed during the last glacial period.

== Flora and fauna ==
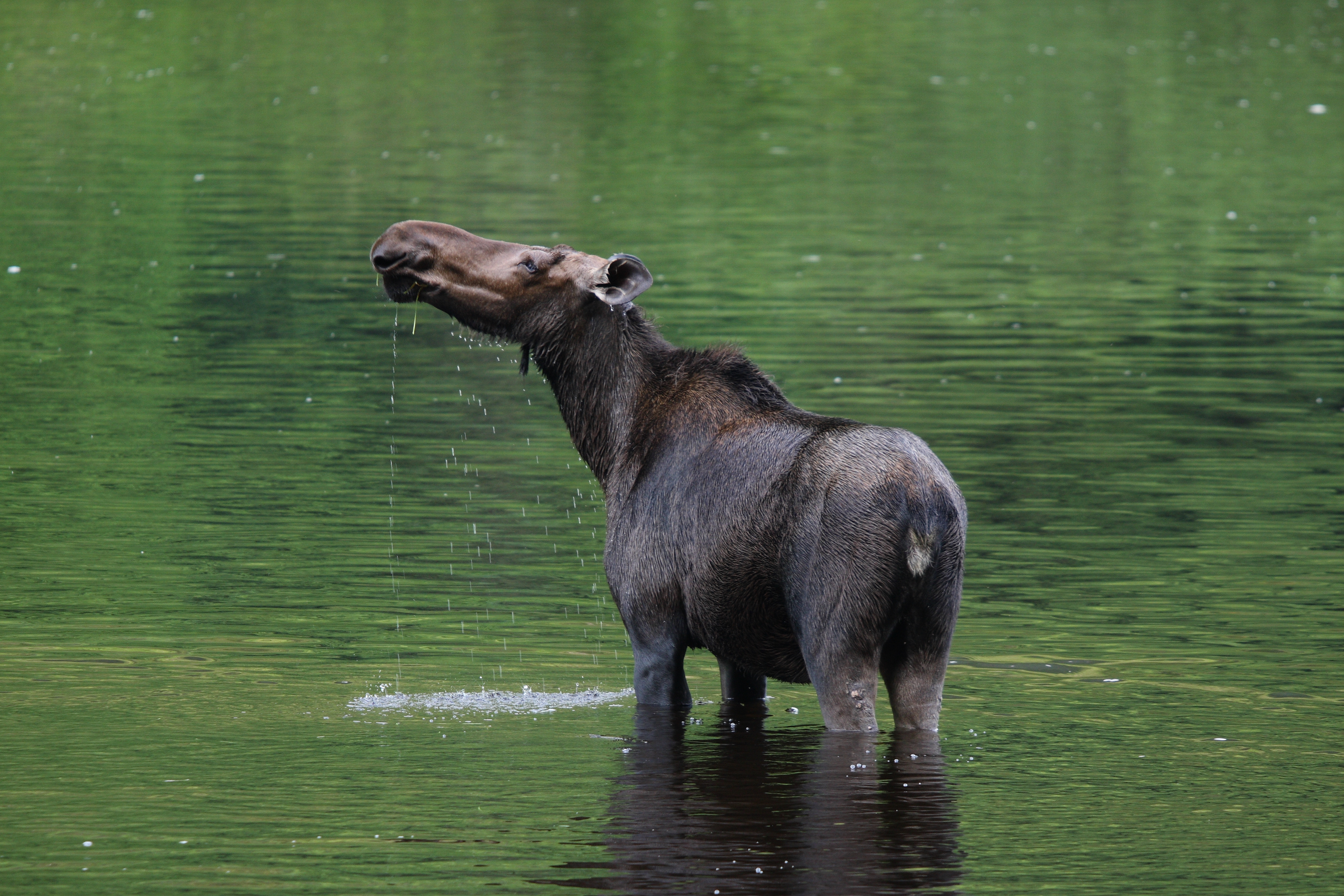
Female moose inside the park.

The plateau consists mainly of coniferous trees such as the black spruce, while the valley consists mainly of deciduous trees such as sugar maple and yellow birch. The invasive Japanese knotweed has also appeared in the park's boundaries.

The wildlife is typical of a boreal forest. Animals that can be found in the park include moose, caribou, white-tailed deer, eastern wolf, red fox, the Canada lynx, the black bear, river otter, porcupine and the Canadian beaver. Atlantic salmon, brook trout and the Arctic char can be found in the lakes and in the Jacques-Cartier river. The park is also visited by more than 100 species of birds.

== Tourism ==
Jacques-Cartier National Park had 145,600 visitors in 2005, with a third of those visitors coming from outside the region. Activities at the park include 100 kilometres (62 mi) of hiking trails, 30 kilometres (19 mi) of biking trails, kayaking, fishing, canoeing, tubing, snowshoeing and skiing. Accommodations at the park include 9 cabins, 5 yurts and 114 campsites.

In 2009, the park underwent a $2.3 million renovation to both modernize and build new infrastructure such as roads and cottages.

== Gallery ==
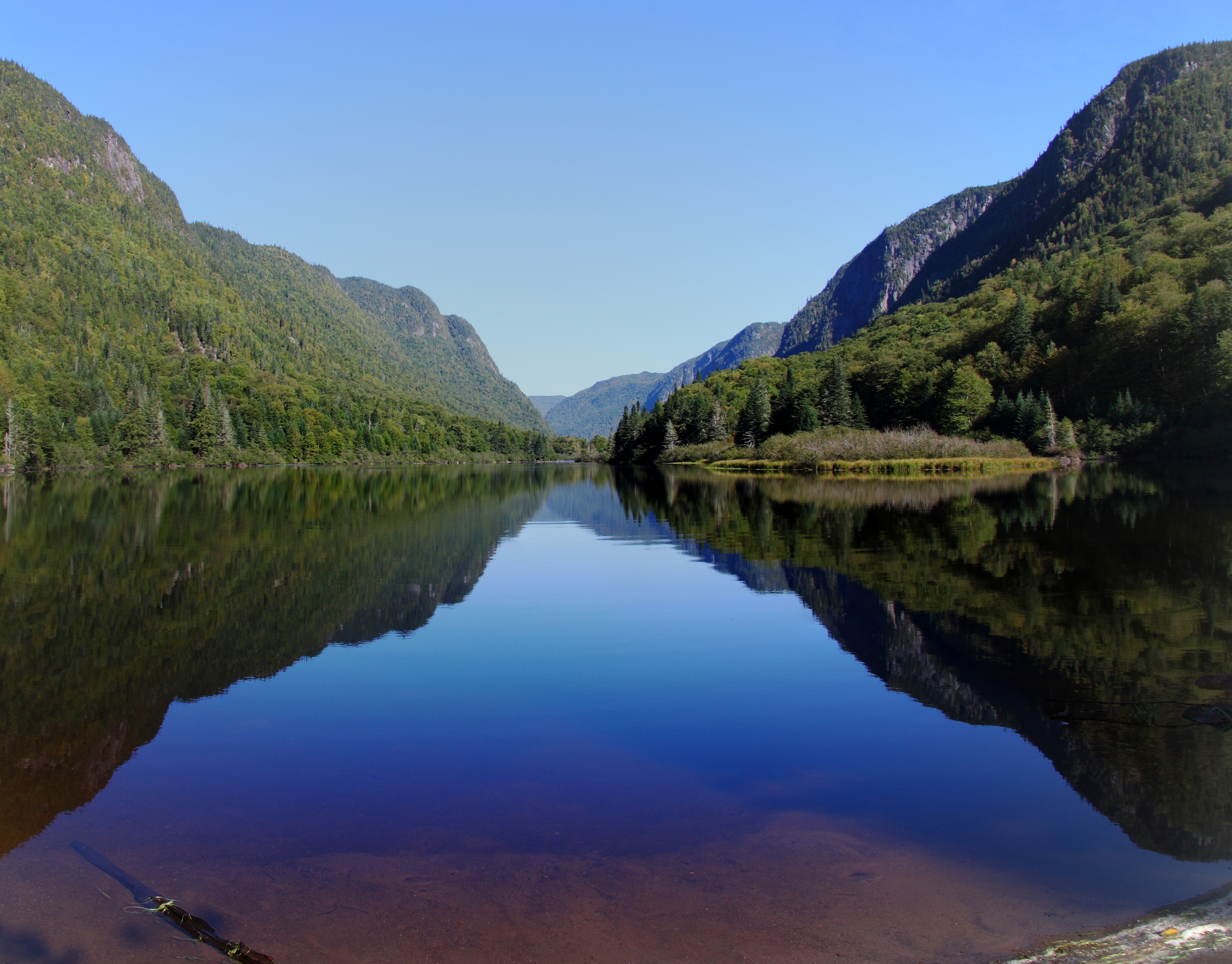
Jacques-Cartier River

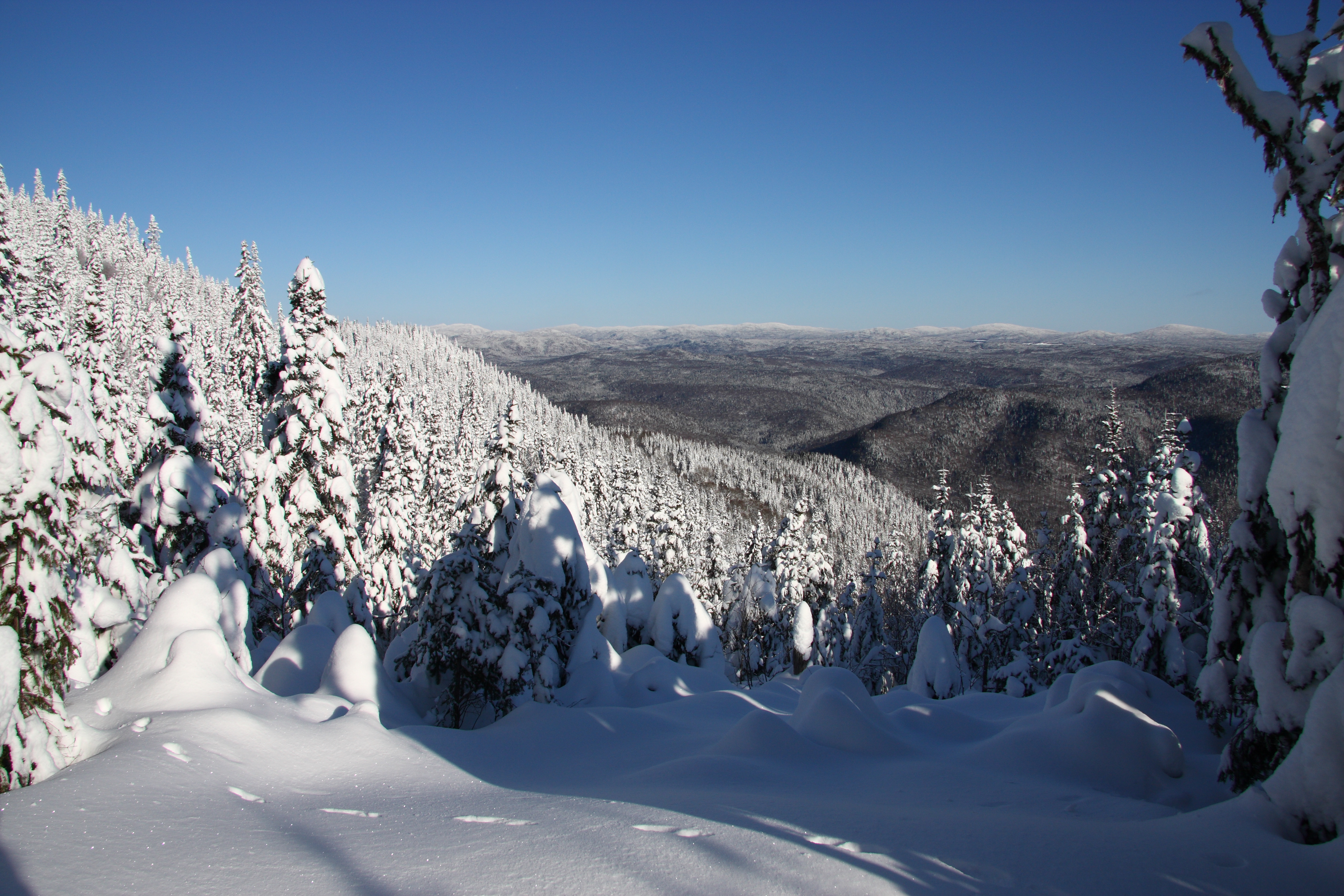
View of the park in the winter

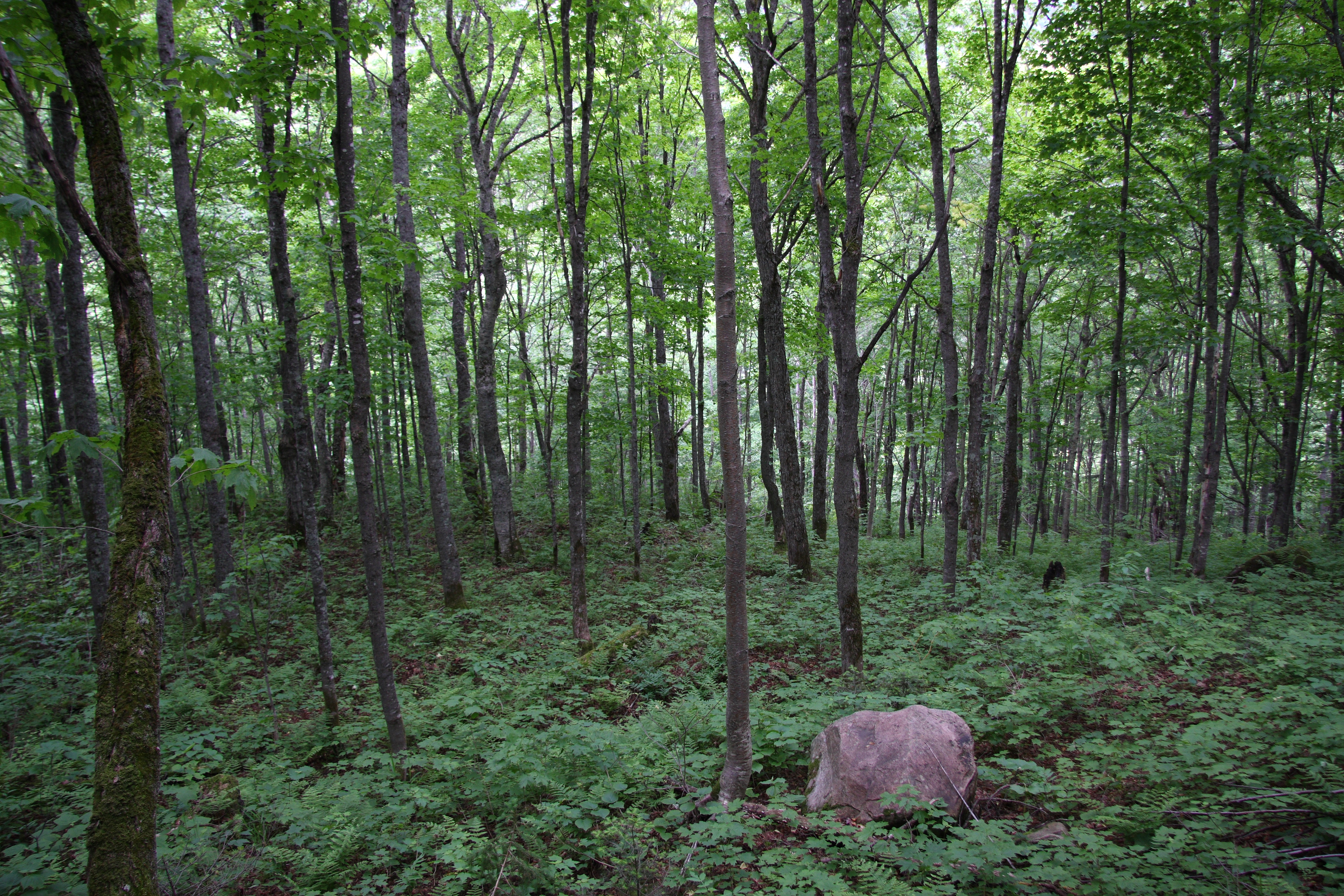
Yellow birch forest understorey

== See also ==
- List of Quebec national parks
- List of National Parks of Canada
- National Parks of Canada
