= Mount Belle Fontaine =

Mountain in Canada

Highest point
- Elevation: 1,151 m (3,776 ft)
- Coordinates: 47.3975°N 71.11°W

Geography
- Country: Canada
- Province: Quebec
- Administrative region: Capitale-Nationale
- Parent range: Jacques-Cartier Massif (Laurentian Mountains)
- Topo map: NTS 21M6 Lac Sautauriski

The Mont Belle Fontaine (in English: Mount beautiful fountain), culminating at 1,151 metres (3,776 ft) of altitude, is the highest summit of the Laurentides Wildlife Reserve.

== Toponymy ==
The summit owes its name to Lac Belle Fontaine located to the west.

== Geography ==
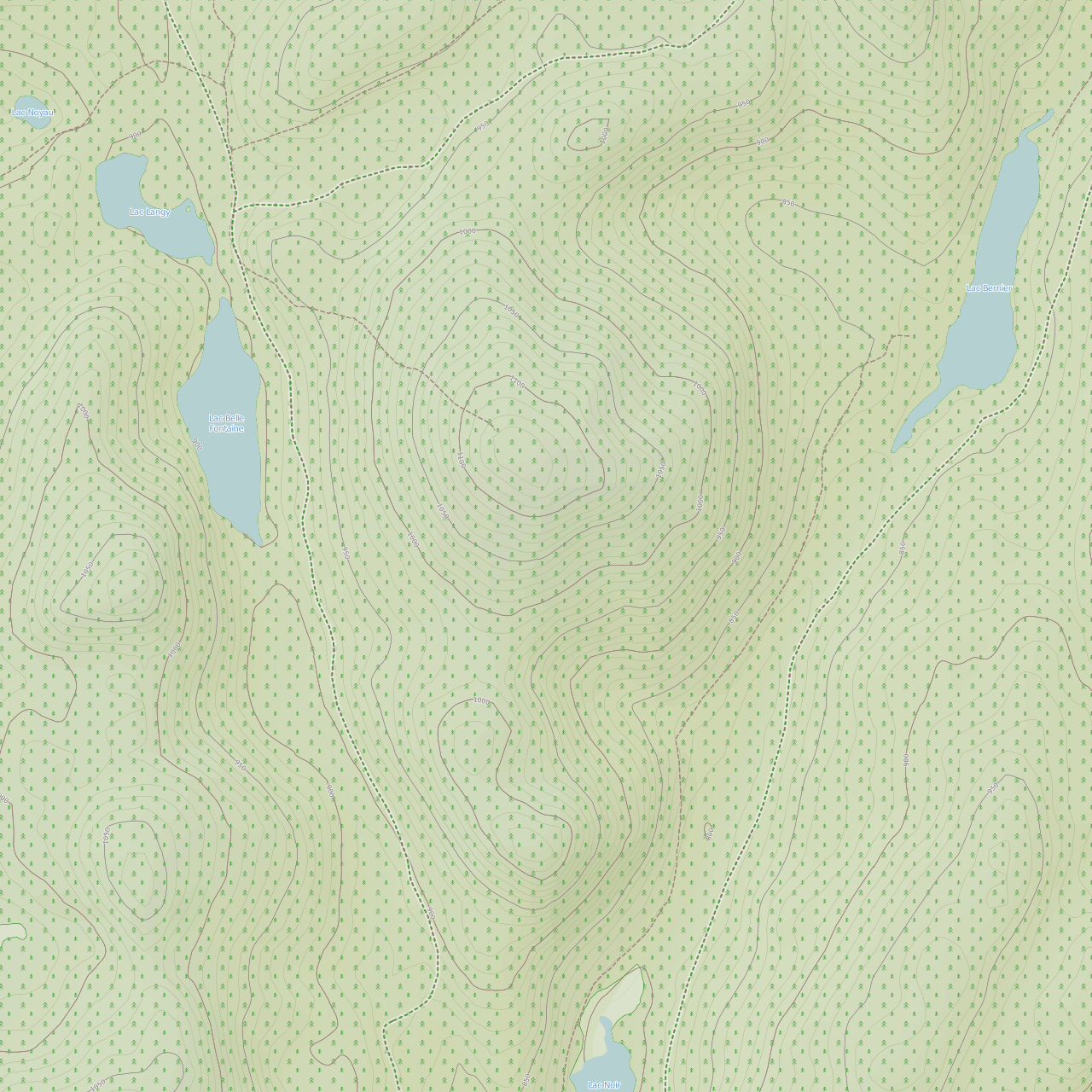
Topographic map of the mountain.

Mount Belle Fontaine is, in a straight line, 5 kilometres (3.1 mi) east of route 175 and 20 km south of L'Étape.

It is the highest point of the Jacques-Cartier Massif and the second summit of the Laurentian Mountains range, after Mount Raoul Blanchard (1,181 metres (3,875 ft)).
