= Aberdeen River =

Location
- Country: Canada
- Province: Quebec
- Region: Mauricie
- City and municipality: La Tuque and Lac-Édouard

Physical characteristics
- Source: Aberdeen Lake
  - location: La Tuque
  - coordinates: 47°43′38″N 72°06′48″W
  - elevation: 429 (m?)
- Mouth: Rivière aux Castors Noirs (via Lac aux Biscuits)
  - location: Lac-Édouard
  - coordinates: 47°38′16″N 72°11′45″W
  - elevation: 343 m
- Length: 17.5 km (10.9 mi)

Basin features
- Tributaries
  - left: (Upward from the mouth) Décharge (via le lac Cleveland) d'un lac non identifié, décharge (via le lac Cleveland) de deux lacs non identifiés, décharge d'un ensemble de lacs dont Hall et McMillen, décharge d'un lac non identifié, décharge d'un lac non identifié, ruisseau non identifié, décharge d'un lac non identifié (via le Lac Edgar), ruisseau non identifié (via le Lac Edgar), décharge du lac Witherbee.
  - right: (Upward from the mouth) Décharge d'un ensemble de petits lacs non identifiés, décharge d'un lac non identifié, décharge (via le lac Cleveland) d'un lac non identifié, décharge (via le lac Cleveland) d'un lac non identifié, décharge d'un ensemble de lacs dont le lac Paré, du Mâle et Boily, décharge du lac du Portage, décharge (via le lac Edgar) de deux lacs non identifiés dont le lac Pierre.

The Aberdeen River is a tributary of the rivière aux Castors Noirs, flowing in the town of La Tuque and in the municipality of Lac-Édouard, in Haute-Batiscanie, in Mauricie, in the province of Quebec, in Canada.

This hydrographic slope is served by some forest roads.

Forestry is the main economic activity in the sector; recreational activities, second.

The surface of the Aberdeen River (except rapids) is generally frozen from early December to late March, but safe circulation on the ice is generally from late December to early March. The water level of the river varies with the seasons and the precipitation.

== Geography ==
The Aberdeen River originates from Aberdeen Lake (length: 3.0 kilometres (1.9 mi); altitude: 429 metres (1,407 ft)) in the city's territory from La Tuque. This long, landlocked lake is mainly fed by seven discharges from the surrounding mountains. Its outfall is located at the bottom of a small bay in the southeastern part of the lake.

The Aberdeen River flows to the bottom of a bay on the eastern shore of Lac aux Biscuits. This confluence is located 4.3 kilometres (2.7 mi) northeast of the Canadian National railway, 3.9 kilometres (2.4 mi) northwest of Lac des Trois Caribous, and 6.2 kilometres (3.9 mi) east of the village center of Lac-Édouard.

== Toponymy ==
Aberdeen is the third largest city in Scotland, located in the north-east of Great Britain, on the banks of the North Sea. In Canada, the term Aberdeen is included in some 50 toponyms.

The toponym “Aberdeen River” was formalized on December 5, 1968 in the Place Names Bank of the Commission de toponymie du Québec.

== See also ==
- La Tuque, a city
- Lac-Édouard, a municipality
- Aberdeen Lake
- Lac aux Biscuits
- Batiscanie
- Batiscan River
- Rivière aux Castors Noirs
- List of rivers of Quebec
