= Mont du Lac à Moïse =

Mountain in Grands-Jardins National Park, Quebec

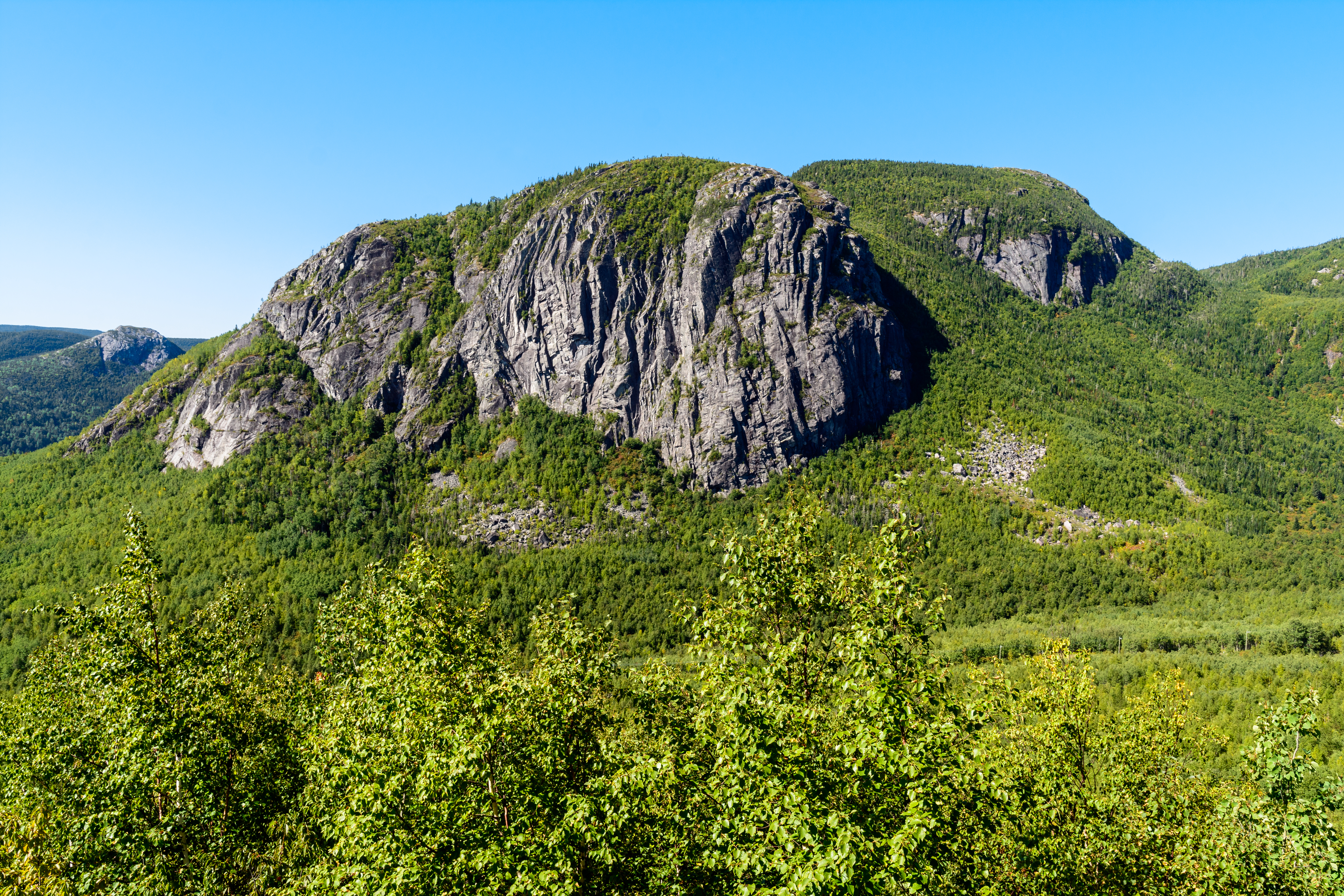
- Summit of Lac à Moïse Mountain

Highest point
- Elevation: 960 m (3,150 ft)
- Coordinates: 47.665833°N 70.644044°W

Geography
- Location: Charlevoix, Capitale-Nationale, Quebec
- Country: Canada

The mont du Lac à Moïse is a mountain of the Jacques-Cartier Massif (chain of the Laurentian Mountains) located within the Grands-Jardins National Park, in the unorganized territory of Lac-Pikauba, in the Charlevoix Regional County Municipality, in the administrative region of Capitale-Nationale, in Quebec, in Canada. It peaks at 960 metres (3,150 ft).

The sector of this mountain is mainly served by the forest road route 381 which passes through the valley along the mountain on the northeast side.

== Toponymy ==
The mountain is named after the lake that sits on top of it. The mention of mont du Lac à Moïse appears for the first time in 1931 in a text by Jacques Rousseau. In 1945, Damase Potvin preferred montagne à Moïse ('Moses' s mountain') in Thomas, Le dernier des coureurs de bois ('Thomas, The Last of the Woodrunners'). Montagne du Gros Bras ('Big Arm Mountain') is also a name used. The toponym was formalized on August 8, 1977, by the Commission de toponymie du Québec.

== Geography ==
The summit of Mont du Lac à Moïse is located at:

- 0.8 kilometres (0.50 mi) southwest of route 381;
- 3.1 kilometres (1.9 mi) west of the summit of Mont du Lac des Cygnes;
- 3.3 kilometres (2.1 mi) north of the summit of Mont du Gros Ruisseau;
- 10.3 kilometres (6.4 mi) south of a bend in the rivière du Gouffre;
- 27.5 kilometres (17.1 mi) northeast of Malbaie Lake which is crossed by the Malbaie River.

Lac à Moïse (length: 559 metres (1,834 ft); maximum width: 279 metres (915 ft); altitude: 817 metres (2,680 ft)) is located 646 metres (2,119 ft) northwest of the summit of Mont du Lac à Moïse. The summit of Lac à Moïse is located 2.5 kilometres (1.6 mi) north of the summit of Mont du Gros Ruisseau and 3.0 kilometres (1.9 mi) west of the summit of Mont du Lac des Cygnes. The cliff on the south side, facing the Rivière du Gouffre, imposes itself with a drop of 603 metres (1,978 ft) comparing the summit and the point of the route 381 which enters the park along Le Gros Bras (at the limit of Saint-Urbain). The camping "Le Pied-des-Monts" is located near the entrance to the park, at the foot of Mont du Lac à Moïse.

The Mont du Lac à Moïse is drained on the north and west side by Le Gros Bras whose upper course establishes a segment of the eastern limit of the Grands-Jardins National Park.

== Activities ==
Unlike its neighbour, the mont du Lac des Cygnes, there is no path allowing its ascent. The project to build a trail to the summit of Mont du Lac à Moïse is often relaunched in the region's media. The south face of the mountain is an expert climbing area. The Gros-Bras sector is among the most difficult rock faces to climb in the Charlevois region. In March 2005, one death occurred and one seriously injured in a climbing accident. The mountain is best climbed from the north face.

== See also ==
- Grands-Jardins National Park
- List of mountains in Canada
- Lac-Pikauba, an unorganized territory
- Grands-Jardins National Park
