= Jacques-Cartier Massif =

Jacques-Cartier Lake Massif
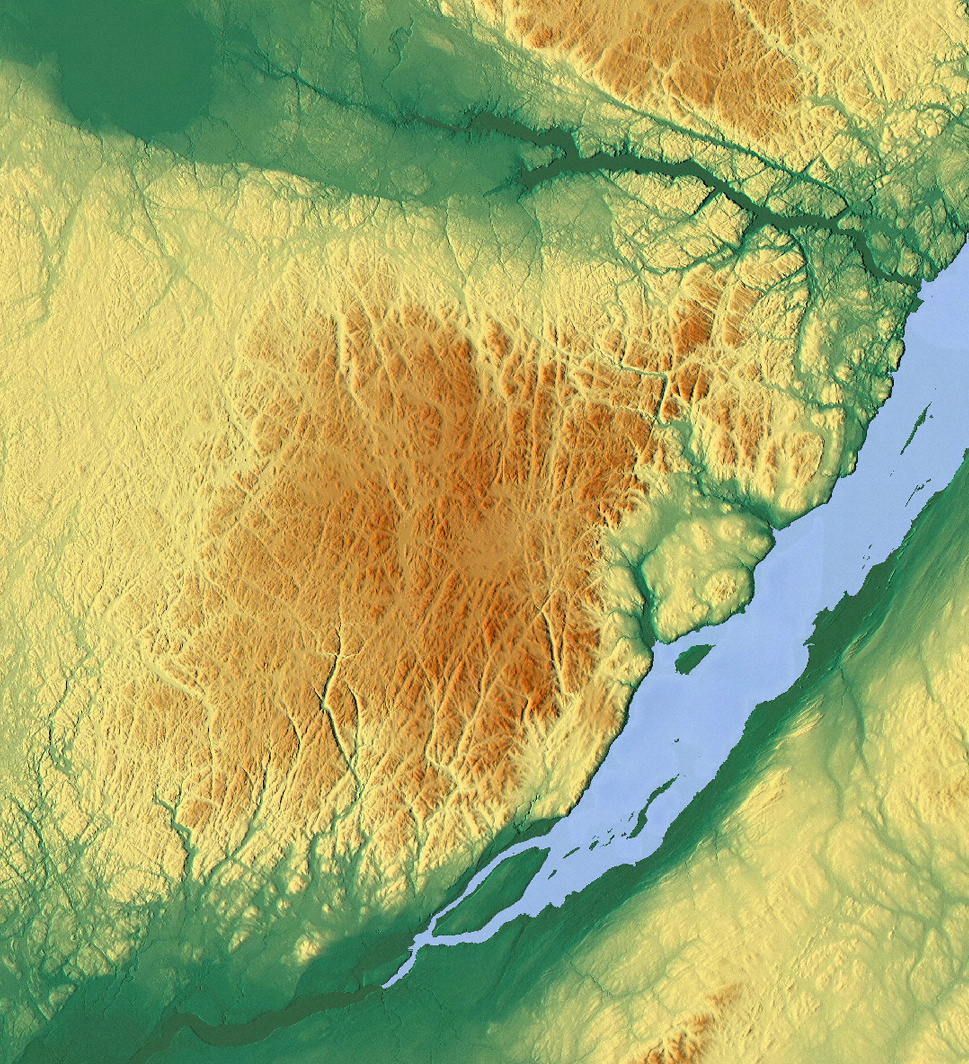
- Topographic map of the massif.

Highest point
- Peak: Mont Raoul Blanchard
- Elevation: 1,181 m (3,875 ft)

Geography
- Country: Canada
- Province: Quebec
- Range coordinates: 47°23′02″N 71°13′02″W

The Lac Jacques-Cartier massif is a massif and the highest mountain range of the Laurentian Mountains, in the Canadian province of Quebec. Located between the St. Lawrence River and the Saguenay Graben, the altitude of its plateau varies between 800 and 900 meters while its highest point, Mount Raoul Blanchard, reaches 1,181 metres (3,875 ft) of altitude.

== Toponymy ==
The massif owes its name to the Jacques-Cartier Lake, a glacial lake located in its geographic center.

== Geography ==
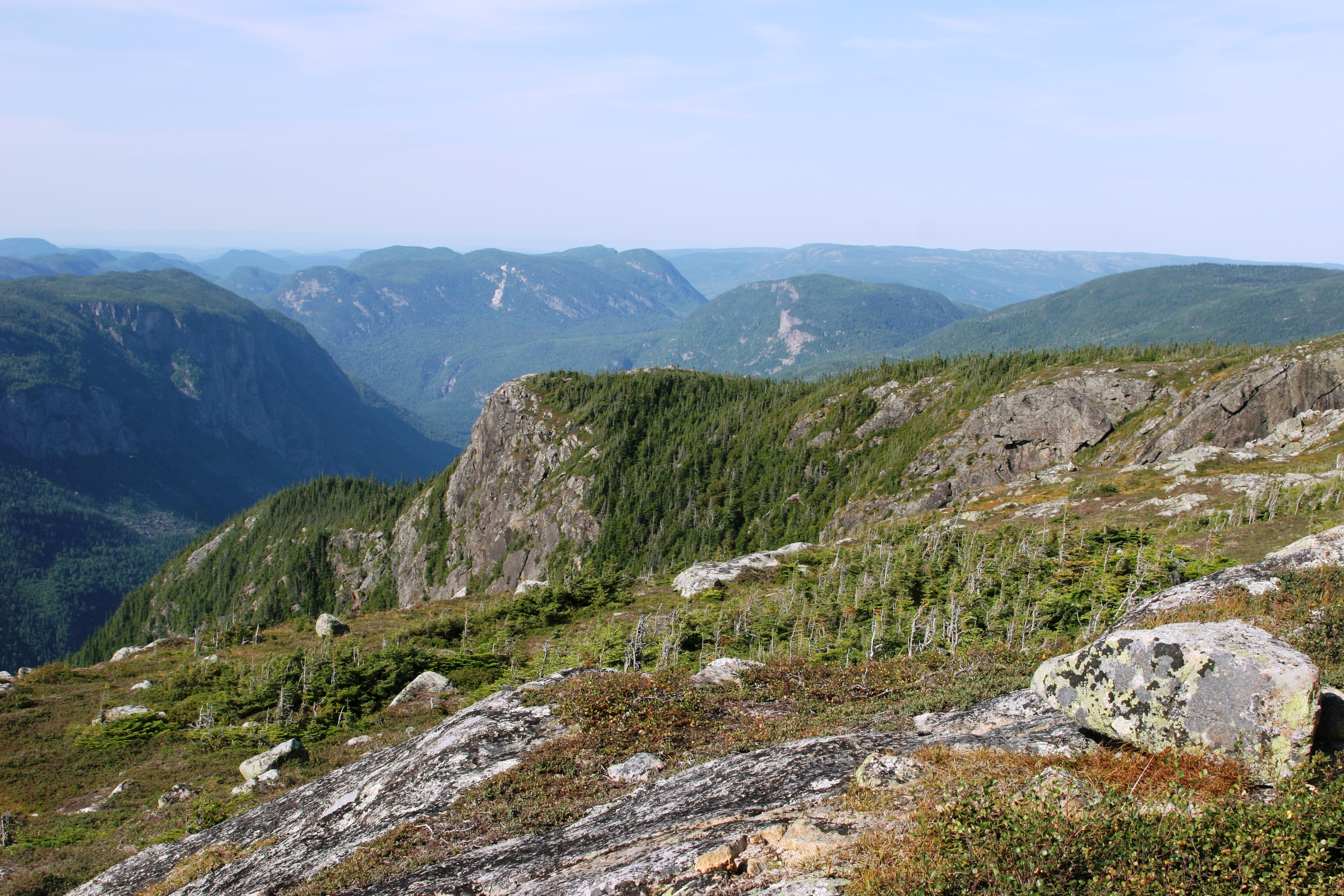
View of the massif in the vicinity of Montagne des Érables.

=== Location ===
The massif roughly covers the entire region of Capitale-Nationale (with the exception of the banks of the St. Lawrence River) as well as the extreme south of the region of Saguenay–Lac-Saint-Jean.

=== Topography ===
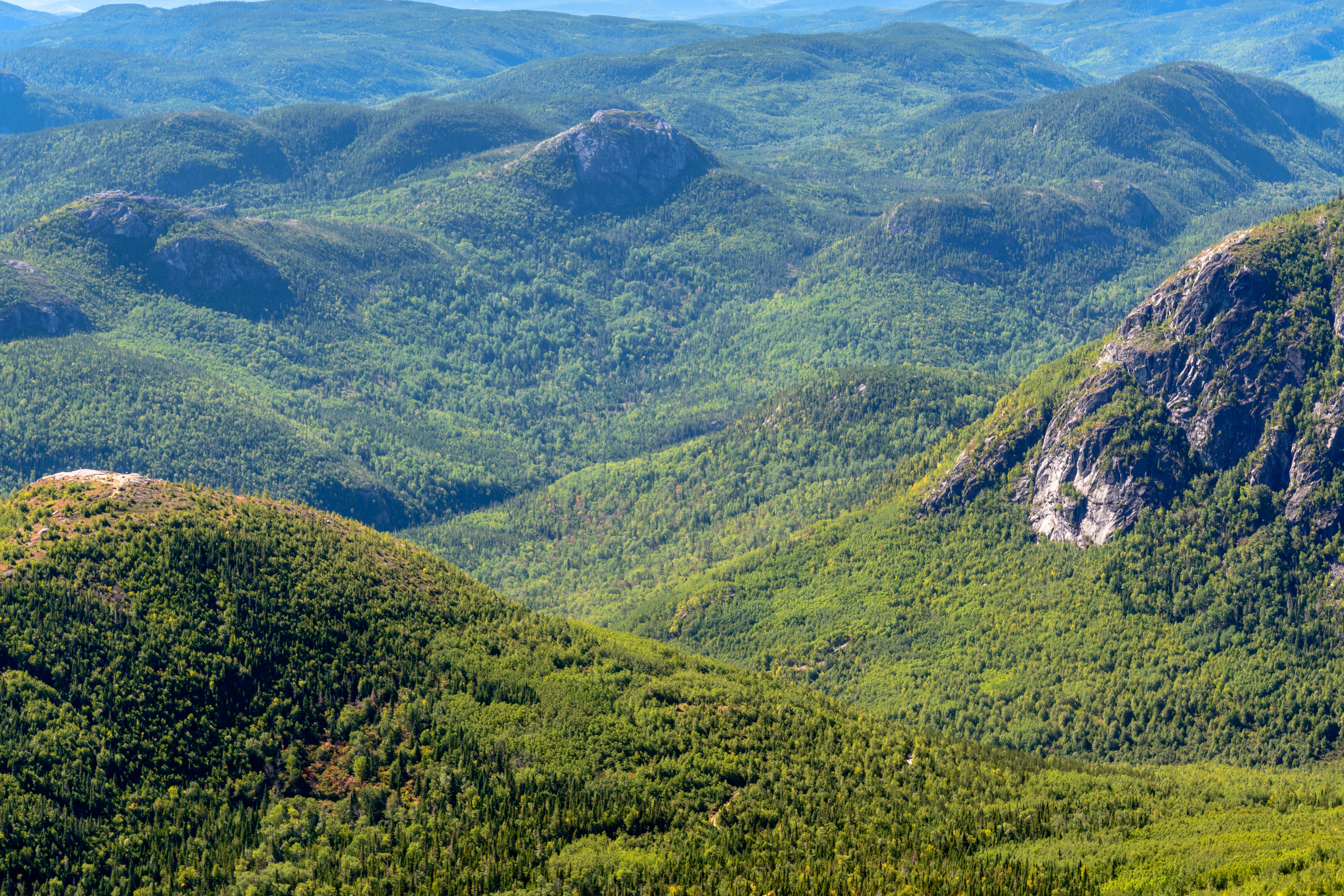
The massif is made up of hundreds of corroded peaks, some of which exceed 1,000 metres (3,300 ft).

The Jacques-Cartier Lake massif is one of the geographical features of the Laurentian Mountains. With the Valin Mountains, its altitude exceeds by several hundred meters the rest of the peaks of the chain. The presence of hundreds of lakes and a few glacial valleys (such as the Jacques-Cartier River valley) represents another distinctive facet of the massif.

The main peaks are:

- Mount Raoul Blanchard (1,181 metres (3,875 ft));
- Mount Belle Fontaine (1,151 metres (3,776 ft));
- Mont de la Québécoise (1,112 metres (3,648 ft));
- Mont François-De Laval (1,082 metres (3,550 ft));
- Mont Jean-Hubert (1,065 metres (3,494 ft));
- Montagne des Érables (1,048 metres (3,438 ft));
- Mont Élie (1,038 metres (3,406 ft));
- Mont Francine-C.-McKenzie (1,000 metres (3,300 ft));
- Mont du Lac des Cygnes (980 metres (3,220 ft));
- Mont du Dôme (975 metres (3,199 ft));
- Mont du Lac à Moïse (960 metres (3,150 ft));
- Mount Apica (884 metres (2,900 ft));
- Mountain in Liguori (790 metres (2,590 ft)).

This list is incomplete and in several sectors of the territory the altitude exceeds 1,000 metres (3,300 ft) without having a physiognomy of mount. In addition, not all high peaks have been officially named as a mountain.

=== Ecosystem ===
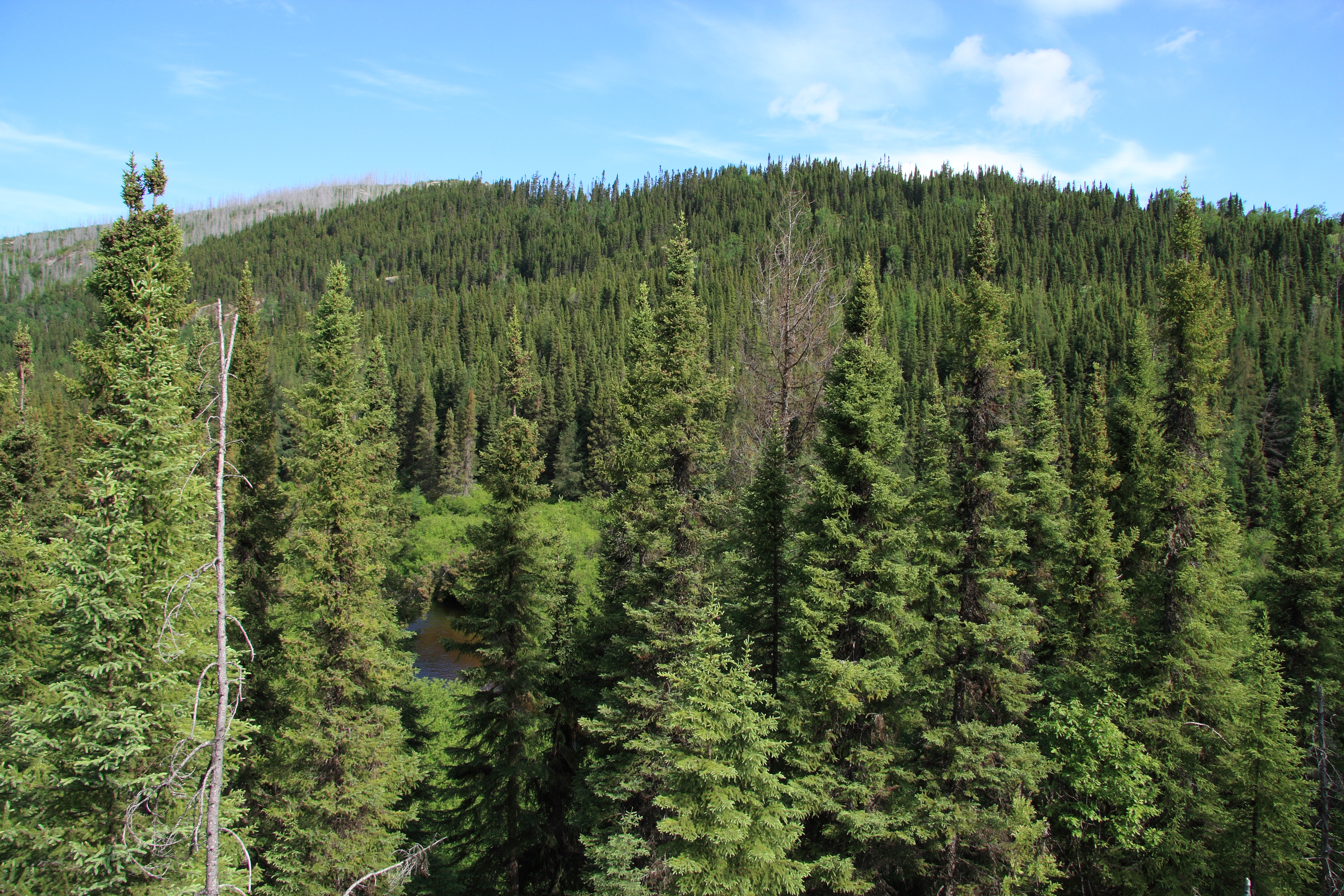
Due to the altitude of the massif, boreal species such as black spruce are abundant.

The massif has an ecosystem boreal that cannot be found elsewhere at this latitude in Quebec. Being part of the domain of white birch fir (sector 5ef), the most common tree species is black spruce. The massif is home to one of the last herds of forest caribou in southern Quebec, the Charlevoix herd.

== Environmental protection ==
The massif is one of the last wilderness areas in southern Quebec. Almost entirely public territory, it is covered among others by the Laurentides Wildlife Reserve, Jacques-Cartier National Park, Grands-Jardins National Park and Hautes-Gorges-de-la-Rivière-Malbaie National Park.

== See also ==
- Laurentian Mountains
- Lac-Jacques-Cartier
- List of mountains of Quebec
