= Aberdeen Lake =

Aberdeen Lake may refer to:

- Aberdeen Lake (Nunavut), Canada
- Aberdeen Lake (La Tuque), Mauricie, Québec, Canada
- Aberdeen Lake (Mississippi), US

== See also ==
- Aberdeen (disambiguation)
- Aberdeen Lake Formation, Ontario, Canada
