= Seigneurie du Triton =

Coordinates: 47.61689°N 72.21770°W

The Seigneurie du Triton is a hunting and fishing outfitter located in the municipality of Lake Edouard, in the administrative region of Mauricie, in Quebec, Canada. The outfitter has exclusive rights to 50 square kilometres (19 sq mi) of wilderness, and is a private enterprise accessible only by water.

== Geography ==
This outfitter territory is part of the biodiversity reserve of the territory of Triton, which covers an area of 407.7 square kilometres (157.4 sq mi). It is located about 45 kilometres (28 mi) (in direct line) northeast of La Tuque downtown. The larger reserve is part of the territory of La Tuque in the administrative region of Mauricie, and in part on the unorganized territory of Lac-Croche, Quebec, the La Jacques-Cartier Regional County Municipality of the Capitale-Nationale administrative region. The coordinates of this reserve, located in the natural province of the Laurentian Mountains, are between 47° 28' and 47° 43' north latitude and 71° 50' and 72° 15' west longitude. This area includes the area of "Lake of Three Caribous" and "Lake Brûlé".

== History ==
The Seigneurie du Triton, originally known as the "Triton Fish & Game Club", is one of the oldest clubs of hunting and fishing in North America. The railway engineer Alexander Luders Light founded the "Triton Fish and Game Club" in 1886, in an area with more than 200 lakes. Formerly very aristocratic, the club has hosted great personalities of world history, including Winston Churchill, Theodore Roosevelt and Harry Truman, as well as members of the Rockefeller and Molson families.

Built in 1893, the Club House is decorated with old photos, artifacts, trophies preserved through taxidermy and antique furniture. The architectural heritage of the Club House and the site was respected. The ground floor of the Club House includes the Hall of Presidents, three dining rooms, bar, den and a shop. Visitors will find five fireplaces and wood stoves. The Club House features 22 rooms, all rustic and of modest dimensions. The property also includes lodges built in woodlands, as well as Amerindian-style lodgings in tipis situated on the banks of the Batiscan River, and cottages situated on lakeshores.

The Seigneurie du Triton is directly accessible by water only, but the nearby Triton Club train station is serviced by VIA Rail several times a week on its Montreal-to-Jonquière route. In earlier years, local train service was available between Hervey-Jonction (in Mauricie) and Chambord (Lac-Saint-Jean). Triton Club station is located near Lac-à-la-Croix, at 7.4 kilometres (4.6 mi) by road from the village of Lake-Edouard. Parking is located near to the train station, and boats from the seigneurie pick up guests arriving by car or rail by arrangement to take them to the main facilities.

The facility provides a range of outdoors activities including canoeing and boating, an extensive network of nature trails and nature observation posts, fishing, and hunting. The outfitter's territory covers 50 square kilometres (19 sq mi), including 12 lakes and Batiscan River. The largest lakes of this area are: Lac aux Biscuits, Lac La Charité and Lac-à-la-Croix. This lake is part of the course of the Batiscan River.

== Toponymy ==
Triton is a sea god in Greek mythology, son of Poseidon and Amphitrite. The largest moon of Neptune was also named after Triton.

The railway station "Club-Triton" was officially registered as of December 5, 1968, at the Commission de toponymie du Québec (Geographical Names Board of Québec). Its decimal coordinates are: longitude -72.24389, 47.61306 latitude.

== See also ==
- Batiscanie
- Batiscan River
- La Tuque
- La Tuque (urban agglomeration)
- Lac-Édouard, municipality
- Lac-Croche, unorganized territory
- Lac aux Biscuits
- Lake of the cross (Lac-Édouard) (Lac à la Croix (Lac-Édouard))
