= Aberdeen Lake (La Tuque) =

Lake in La Tuque, Quebec, Canada

- Location in Quebec
- Location: La Tuque, Mauricie
- Coordinates: 47.73917°N 72.11305°W
- Lake type: Natural
- Primary inflows: Seven stream discharges from the surrounding mountains
- Primary outflows: Aberdeen River
- Basin countries: Canada
- Max. length: 2.9 km (1.8 mi)
- Max. width: 1.0 km (0.62 mi)
- Surface elevation: 429 m (1,407 ft)

Aberdeen Lake is the main head water of the Aberdeen River, located in Upper Batiscanie in the territory of the city of La Tuque, in the administrative region of Mauricie, in the province of Quebec, Canada.

This hydrographic slope is served on the west and south side by the forest road R0410.

Forestry is the main economic activity in the sector; recreational activities, second.

The surface of Aberdeen Lake is generally frozen from the beginning of December to the end of March.

== Geography ==
Lake Aberdeen has a length of 2.9 kilometres (1.8 mi), a width of 1.0 kilometre (0.62 mi) and an altitude of 429 metres (1,407 ft).

The mouth of Aberdeen Lake is located 3.1 kilometres (1.9 mi) northwest of the limit of the Laurentides Wildlife Reserve, 14.2 kilometres (8.8 mi) northeast from the center of the village of Lac-Édouard, at 6.1 kilometres (3.8 mi) south-east of Ventadour Lake, at 3.3 kilometres (2.1 mi) south-east of Grand lac Macousine and 13.3 kilometres (8.3 mi) east of Saint-Henri Lake.

This long, landlocked lake is mainly fed by seven discharges from the surrounding mountains.

Aberdeen Lake has an island (length: 0.9 kilometres (0.56 mi) in the north central part of the lake and ten other small islands. It also has five bays, two on the north side, one to the west where a few chalets have been built and two bays on the south side, one of which is to the southeast where the outlet of the lake is located. From the mouth of this lake, the current descends on 17.5 kilometres (10.9 mi) in following the course of the Aberdeen River generally towards the southwest, then the current merges with the rivière aux Castors Noirs by first crossing on 2.1 kilometres (1.3 mi) on lac aux Biscuits. Finally, the current flows into the upper part of the Batiscan River which goes southward to the north-west shore of St. Lawrence River.

== Toponymy ==
The toponym "Aberdeen Lake" was formalized on December 5, 1968 at the Place Names Bank of the Commission de toponymie du Québec.
