= Mont du Lac des Cygnes =

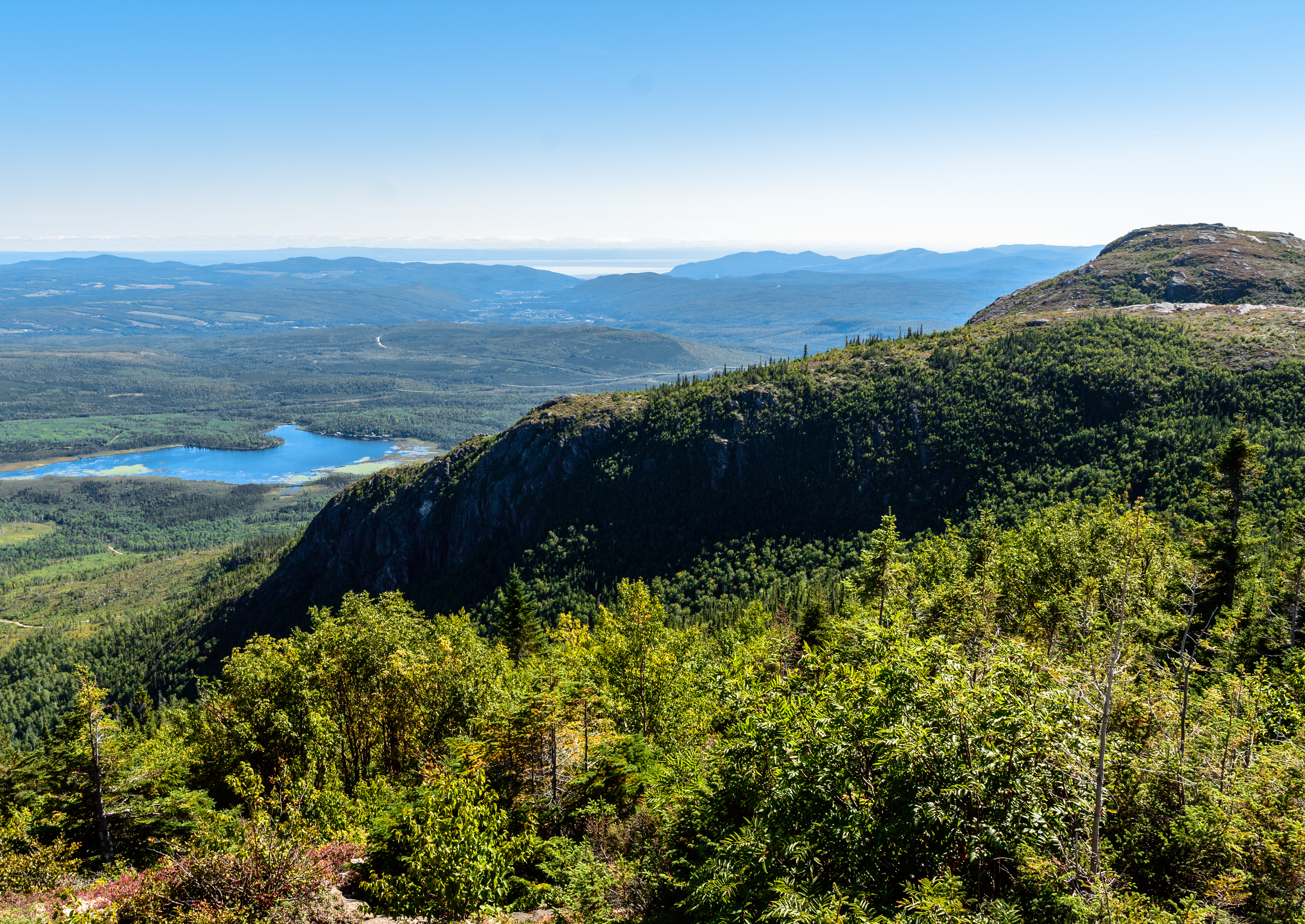
- View of mount and Swan Lake

Highest point
- Elevation: 980 m (3,220 ft)
- Coordinates: 47°39′58″N 70°36′14″W

Geography
- Location: Charlevoix, Capitale-Nationale, Quebec
- Country: Canada

Mont du Lac des Cygnes ("Swan Lake Mountain") is a mountain of the Jacques-Cartier Massif (Laurentian Mountains chain), located within the Grands-Jardins National Park in Quebec, Canada. Its summit culminating at 980 metres (3,220 ft) above sea level and overlooking the valley of the Rivière du Gouffre is one of the main attractions of the park.

== Toponymy ==
The name of the mountain comes from a lake of the same name located 3 kilometres (1.9 mi) south of it. It was used for the first time on a map of the Parc des Laurentides in 1942. As for the name of the lake, it has an obscure origin, but it would have been known since at least 1850.

== Geography ==
The summit of Mont du Lac des Cygnes is located in the eastern part of the Grands-Jardins National Park, almost at the limit of Saint-Urbain. The drop between the summit (981 m) and the surface of Lac des Cygnes (320 m), located below, is 660 m. This mountain is delimited between the course of the Rivière du Gouffre Sud-Ouest which passes the valley on the north side, and Le Gros Bras which passes in the valley on the south side.

The summit of the mountain once featured a forest fire observation tower, erected as a metal structure resembling the electricity towers for the transmission of electricity.

Sometimes school groups organize hikes along the path of the Tower to reach the summit. In 2007, students from the music concentration at Jean-de-Brébeuf high school gave a concert at the top of Mont du Lac-des-Cygnes. This hike was organized as part of the International Journal of Music, on October 1. Nearly 200 students from the instrumental music concentration took part in the ascent of the mountain.

== Activities ==
The Mont-du-Lac-des-Cygnes trail in Grands-Jardins National Park is 8.6 kilometres (5.3 mi) long and provides access to the summit. The drop is 480 metres (1,570 ft) (altitude of 480 metres (1,570 ft) at the base and 980 metres (3,220 ft) at the top). It offers a view of Lac des Cygnes, the "Astroblème de Charlevoix" (Charlevoix impact structure) and even the St. Lawrence River.

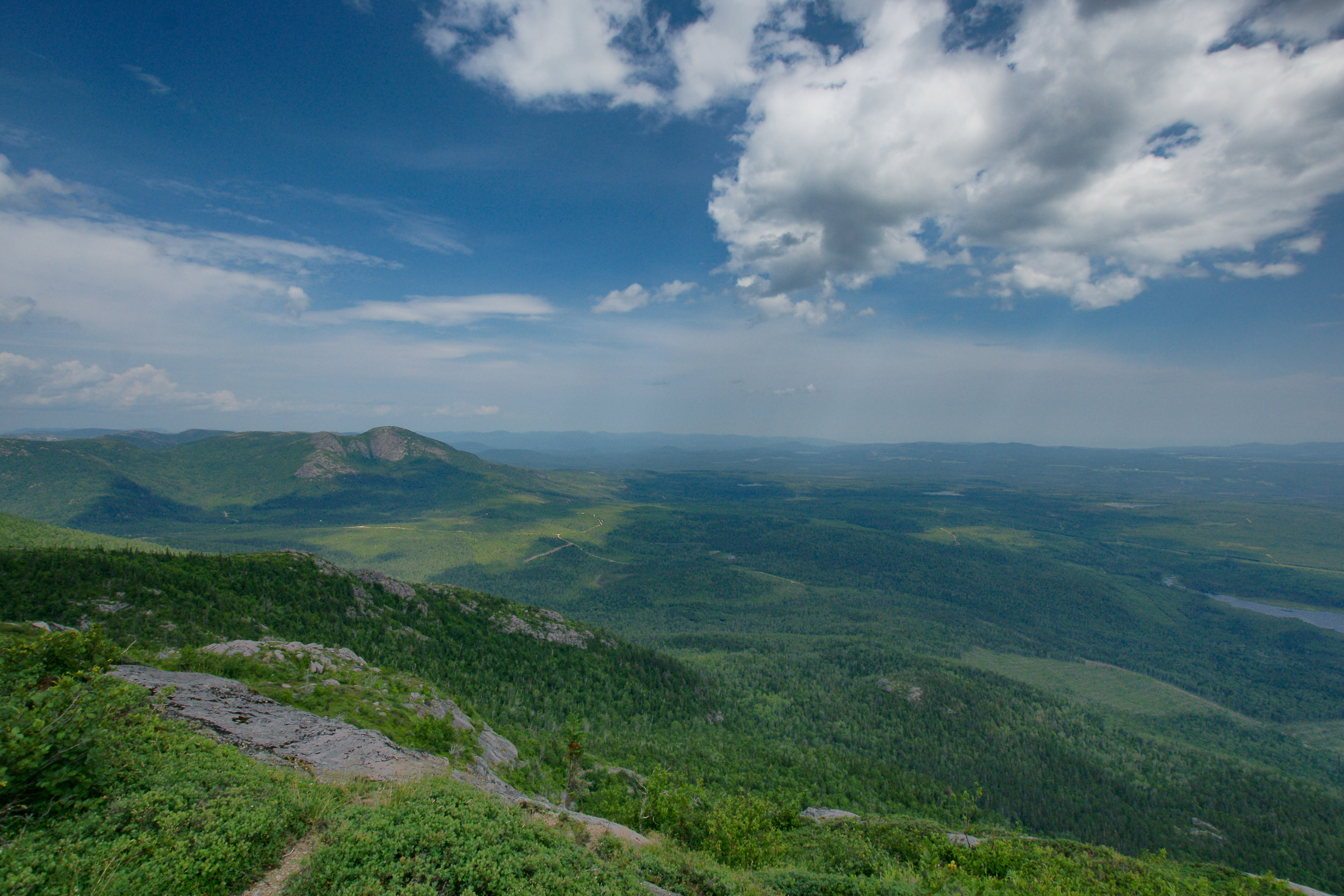
Scenic view from the summit

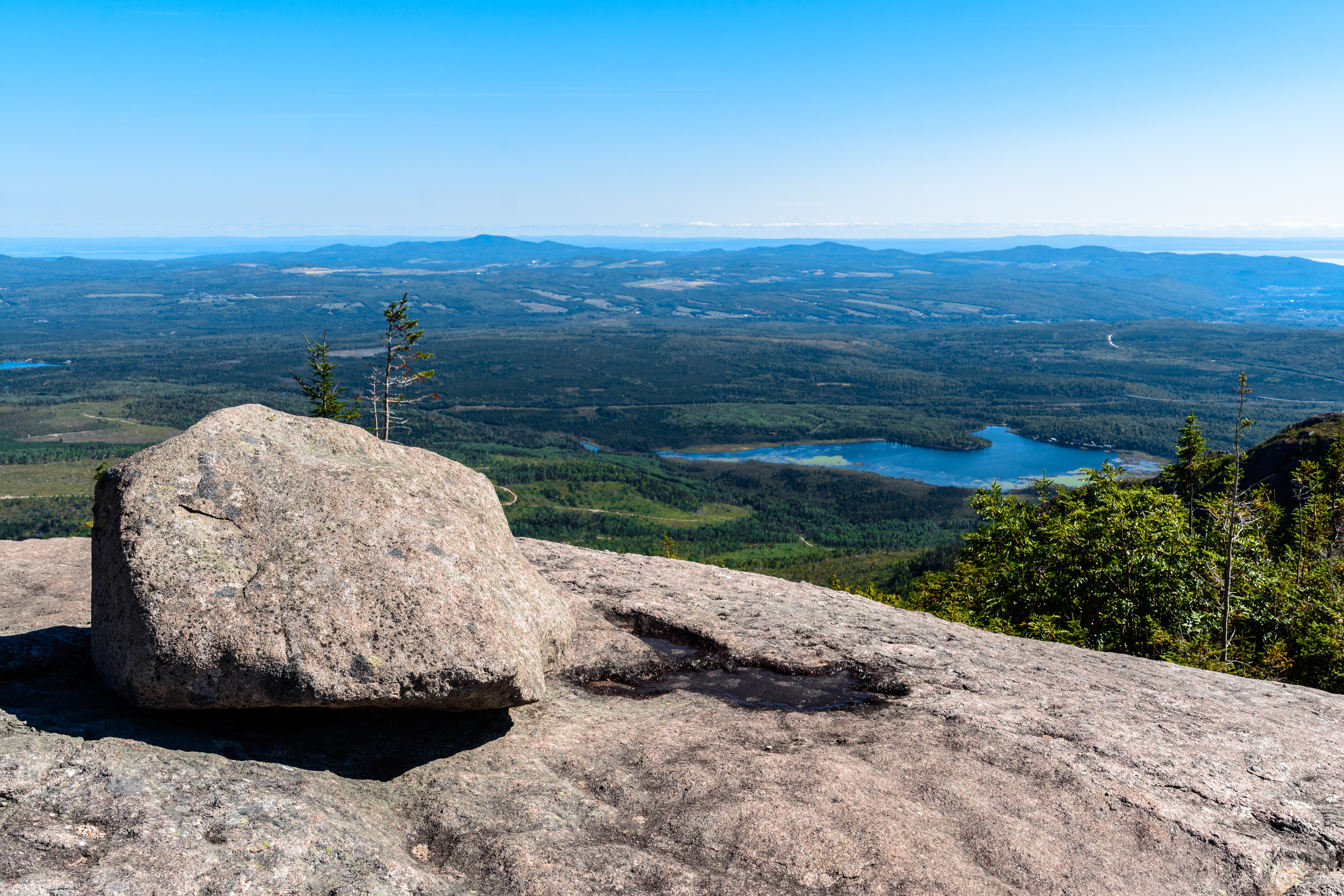
Scenic view from the summit

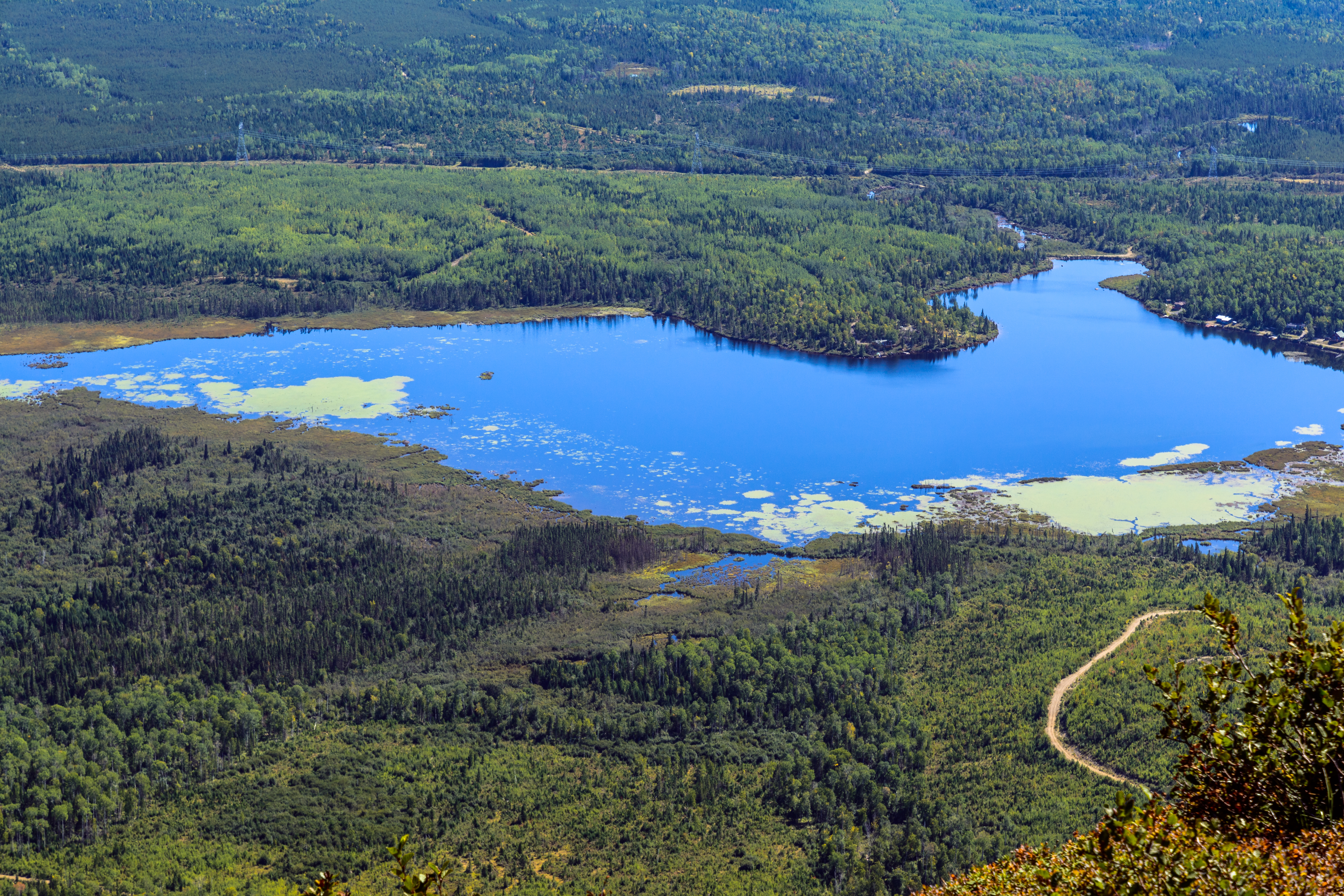
Lac des Cygnes

== See also ==
- Grands-Jardins National Park
- List of mountains in Canada
