= Grands-Jardins National Park =

National park of Quebec

- IUCN category II (national park)
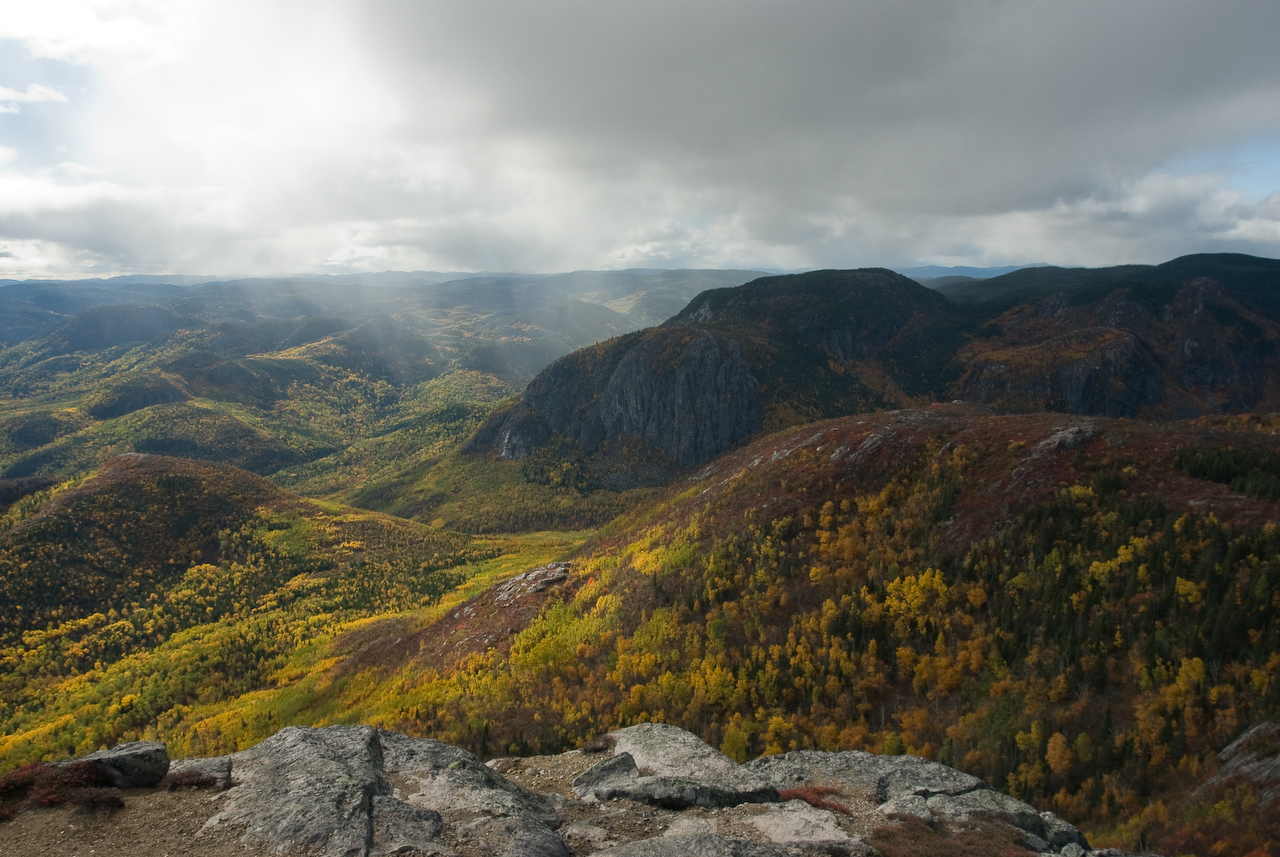
- Interactive map of Grands-Jardins National Park
- Location: Lac-Pikauba, Charlevoix Regional County Municipality, Quebec, Canada
- Nearest city: Baie-Saint-Paul
- Coordinates: 47°41′N 70°51′W
- Established: 1981
- Governing body: Ministère du Développement durable, de l’Environnement et des Parcs - SÉPAQ

Grands-Jardins National Park (French: Parc national des Grands-Jardins, pronounced [paʁk nɑsjɔnal de ɡʁɑ̃ ʒaʁdɛ̃]) is a provincial park, located in the Unorganized Territory of Lac-Pikauba, in the Charlevoix Regional County Municipality, an administrative region of Capitale-Nationale, in Quebec, Canada.

The Grands-Jardins National Park is a protected area for the conservation of the natural heritage of the Charlevoix region in which certain human activities are permitted. It is one of the central areas of the Charlevoix World Biosphere Reserve, status granted by the UNESCO in 1988, just seven years after the park was created. The park is managed by the Quebec government thanks to the Société des établissements de plein air du Québec (SÉPAQ).

This Charlevoix park covers an area of 318.9 kilometres (198.16 mi) accessible from the south by Route 381 via Saint-Urbain in the region of Capitale-Nationale. The closest town to the park is Baie-Saint-Paul.

== Main attractions and activities ==
It offers several activities to park visitors in both summer and winter. Among the activities offered are camping, canoeing, kayaking, hiking, fishing, cross-country skiing and snowshoeing. SÉPAQ also offers discovery workshops to learn more about the flora and fauna of the park and to raise awareness of the fragility of ecosystems and the services they provide.

== History ==
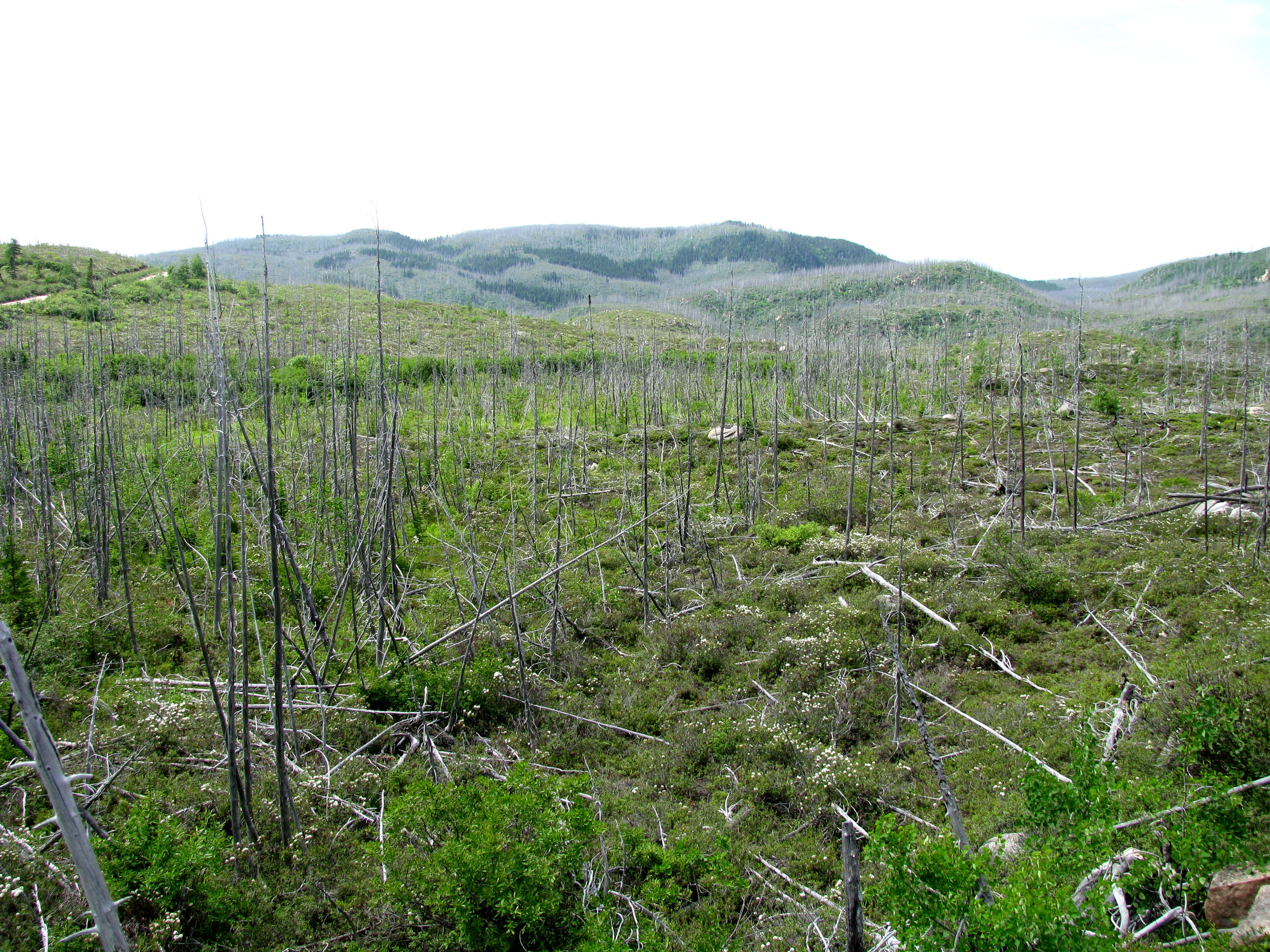
1991 forest fire in the Thomas-Fortin sector

Before the park was created on November 25, 1981, the site was used for logging. From 1939 to 1981, this activity had affected 39% of the area of the current national park. The park also has its own cultural heritage. Its history as an English resort, hunting and fishing with the Murray River fishing Club, also called Club La Roche, a former private fishing club adds to the history of logging and dredging that took place in the park before its creation.

Grands-Jardins National Park protects an environment that is highly representative of the natural region of the Jacques-Cartier Lake Massif. The natural environment of the park is dominated by forests. Approximately 30% of the park was ravaged by forest fires in 1991 and again in 1999. Although the landscape of these fires is not very attractive for the human eye, it is essential for the renewal of the forest and for the creation of refuges for certain species. Indeed, dead wood trunks on the ground or standing are ideal shelters for birds, rodents, insects and fungi. A few years after the fire, the forest begins to regain its appearance and slowly resumes its cycle of natural succession.

On September 13, 2017, the Grands-Jardins National Park was enlarged by 8.9 kilometres (5.53 mi) to reach an area of 318.9 kilometres (198.16 mi).

== Geography ==
=== Topography ===
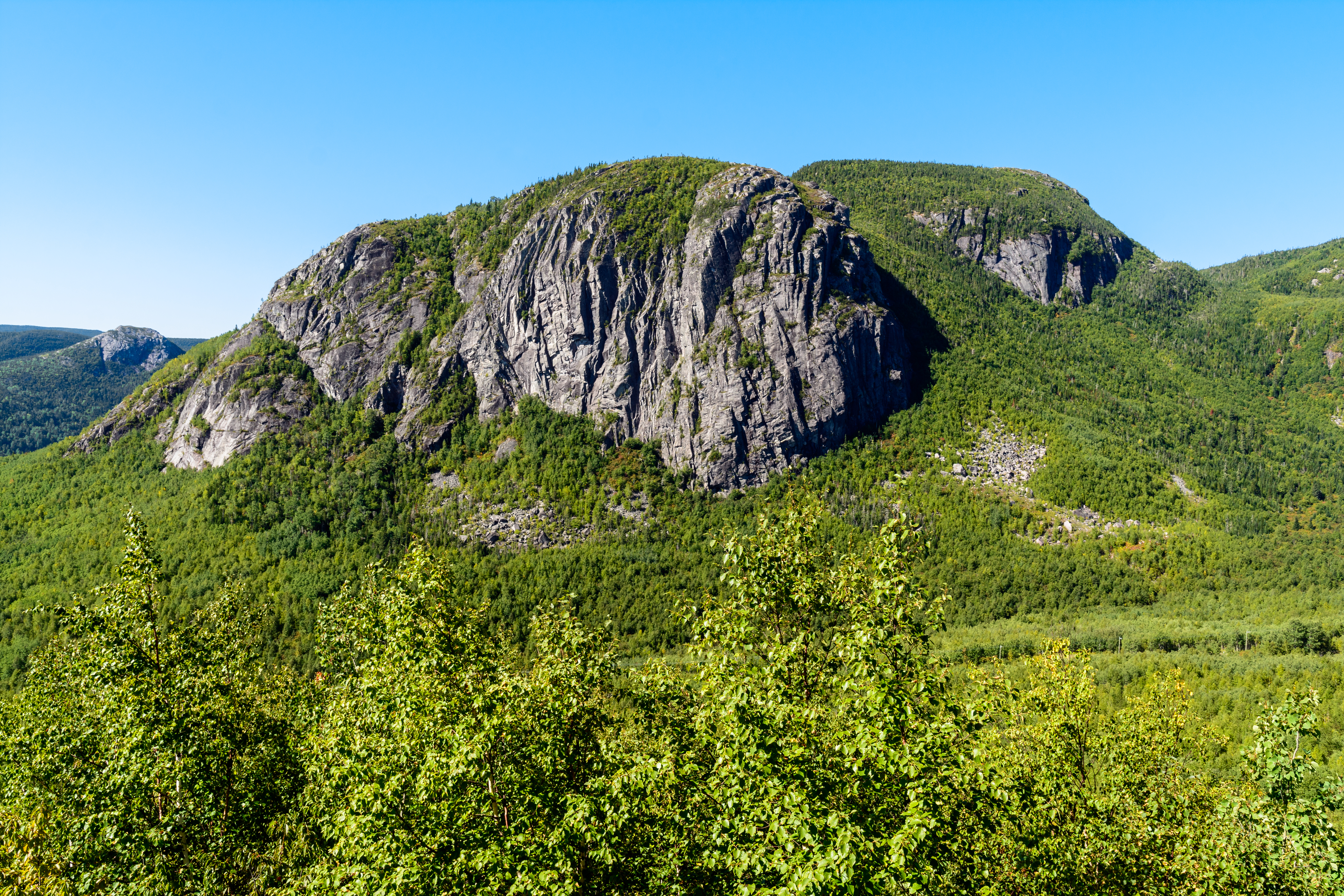
Mont du Lac à Moïse

Panorama of the park taken from Mont-du-lac-des-Cygnes

The topography of the park is varied due to the mountain ranges that characterize the park. The climatic conditions of the park can easily vary from place to place. The territory is part of the Canadian Shield and its rock base is mainly composed of granite rocks such as igneous rock. In addition, part of the territory is composed of anorthosite, a type of igneous rock.

- Mont du Lac à Moïse
- Mont du Lac des Cygnes
- Mont de l'Ours
- Mont Jean-Palardy
- Mont René-Richard
- La Chouenne

=== Hydrography ===
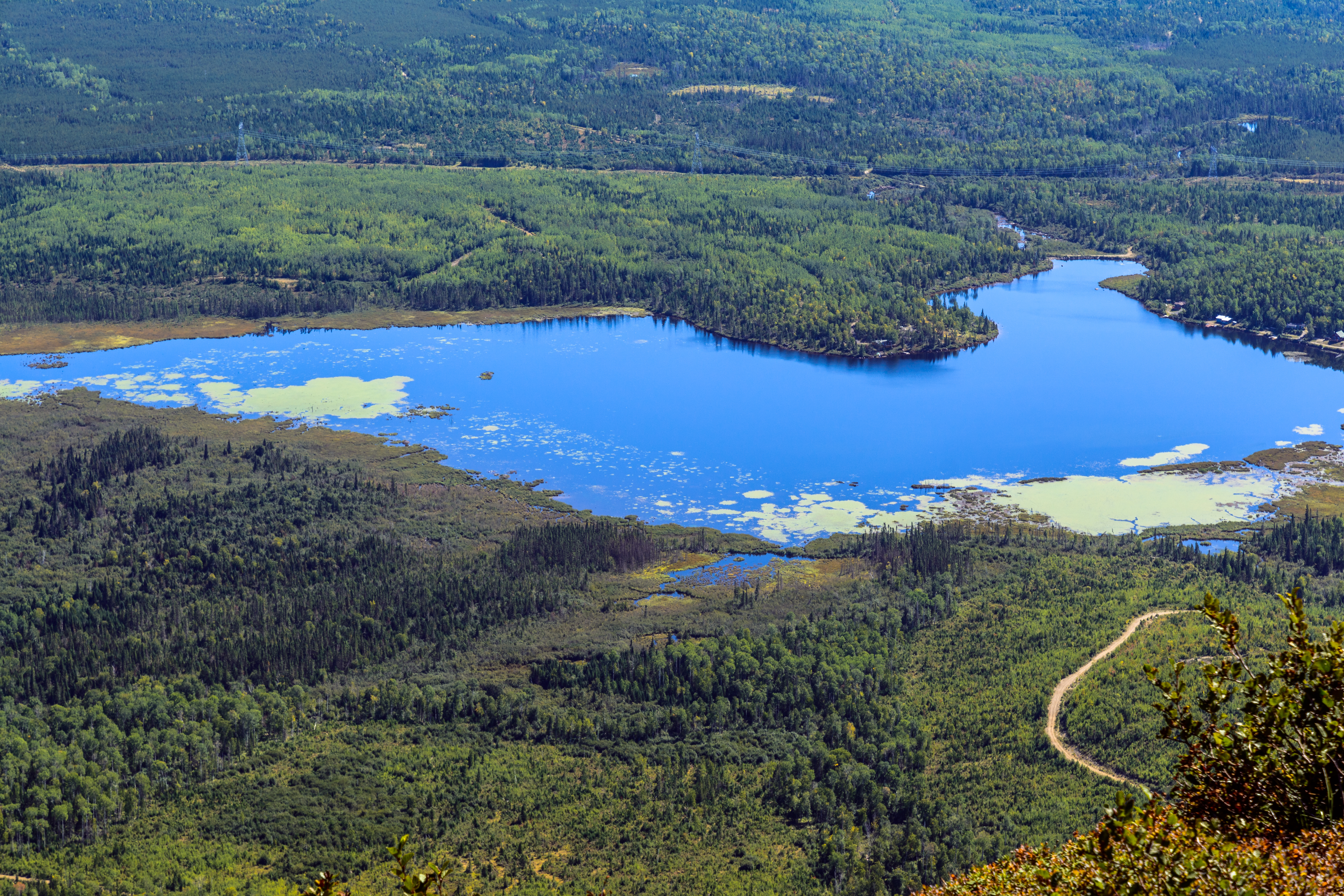
Lac des Cygnes

The park includes more than 120 bodies of water as well as several mountains that are part of the mountain range of Laurentian Mountains. The summits of these mountains are protected because of the fragility of the ecosystems present at the summits which are sensitive to the trampling of hikers. These summits are still accessible to hikers by marked and landscaped trails. The water bodies make up 3.6% of the park area and the two most important watersheds are the Malbaie River and the Sainte-Anne-du-Nord River.

== Fauna ==
The park offers habitat for several animals. Three distinct habitat types can be observed in the park: young forests which were created by natural fires and logging, mature forests composed of black spruce and balsam fir with closed cover and taiga reminiscent of the Great Northern Quebec. Taiga environments similar to that of Grands-Jardins National Park are normally found more than 500 kilometres (310 mi) further north, above the 52nd parallel. These different habitats make it possible to shelter a variety of animals, some of which have threatened or vulnerable status. There are populations of moose, reindeer, black bear, red fox, porcupine, common loon, spruce grouse, eastern wolves, lynx and several other species.

Due to the diversity of habitats found within the national park, several species frequent it, including three species that are classified as vulnerable, namely the woodland caribou of the forest ecotype, the Bicknell's thrush and Barrow's goldeneye. These species have the most serious status under the Quebec Act on threatened or vulnerable species. There are also seven species likely to be designated threatened or vulnerable, namely Arctic char, golden eagle, peregrine falcon, common nighthawk, chimney swift, rock vole, cougar and southern bog lemming.

=== Mammals ===
The mammal category includes as many large mammals as small rodents, moving from moose to bear and porcupine. We thus find the following mammals: several species of shrews (the great shrew, the common shrew, sooty, palustrine and pygmy), the star-nose mole, the snowshoe hare, the red squirrel, the large flying squirrel, the common marmot, Canada beaver, several species of voles (red-backed gapper, fields, rocks, Cooper's lemming), Phenacomys, muskrat, some species of mouse (deer, wood jumping and field jumping), American porcupine, coyote, gray wolf, red fox, black bear, raccoon, long-tailed weasel, stoat, river otter, woodland caribou, white-tailed deer, moose, American marten, American mink, striped skunk, cougar and Canadian lynx. This is explained by the varied habitats offered by the vast territory of the Grands-Jardins National Park.

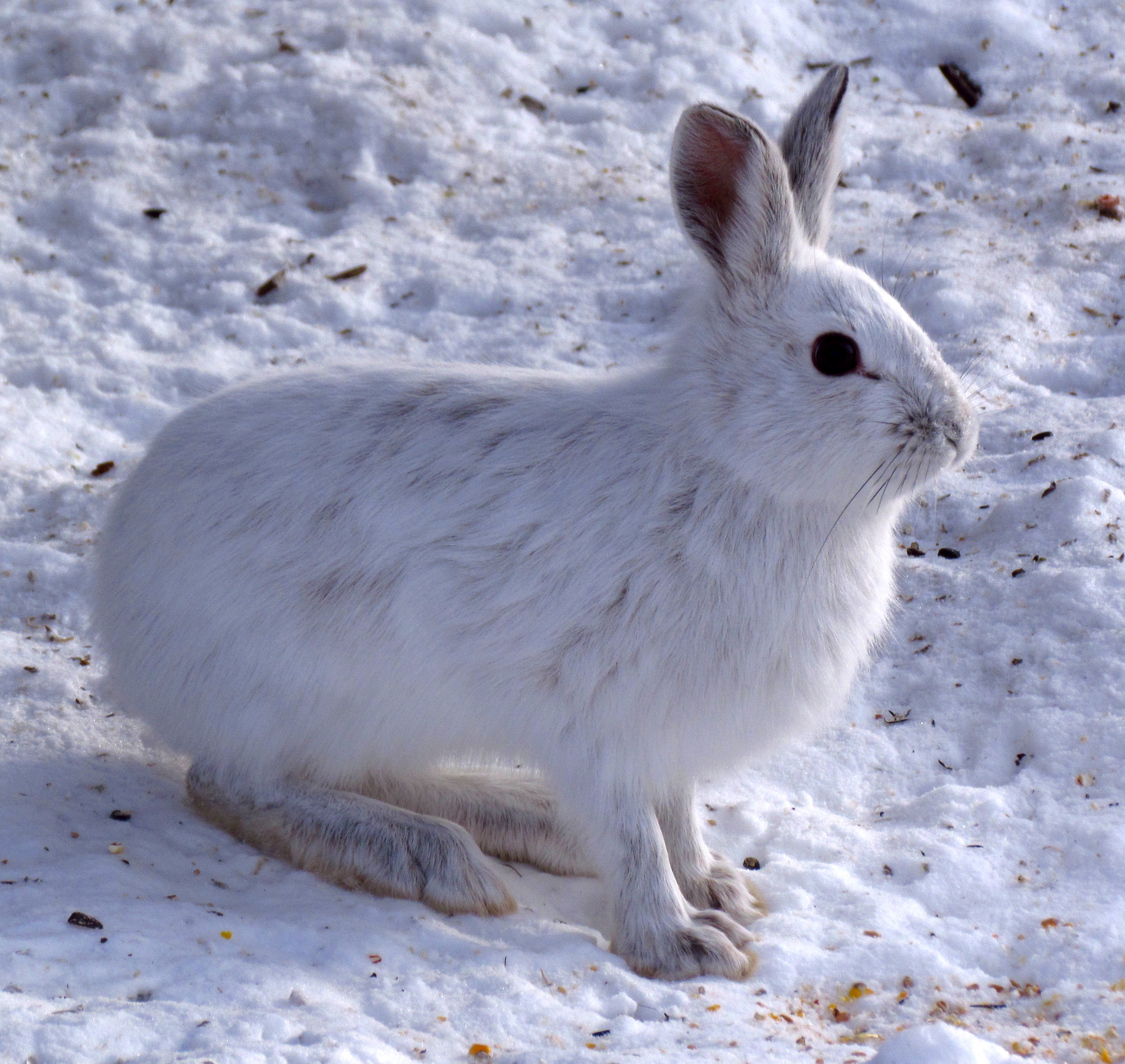
Snowshoe hare

The snowshoe hare is one of the most important species in the park (and even in Canada) from an ecological point of view, because it represents a food source for a good number of predators which frequent the national park and the boreal forest in general such as the Canada lynx, the red fox and the coyote. In addition, it feeds on several plants and shrubs in the boreal forest.

The woodland caribou (Rangifer tarandus caribou) is a mammal very sensitive to the presence of humans. Too large a presence on its territory can disturb the species and modify its behavior and lead it to frequent places less favorable for the species, making the caribou more vulnerable to its predators such as the wolf and the black bear. The territory of the Grands-Jardins Park is an important environment for the calving, rutting and winter feeding of the woodland caribou and plays a decisive role in the conservation of the species. It lives in particular in mature coniferous forests where arboreal lichens are very present.

The black bear, an omnivorous animal whose diet consists mainly of plants, is abundant in the national park. However, it also feeds on fawns that are easy prey for bears when they venture out of the dense forest. The bear prefers open and semi-open sites where the vegetation constituting a good part of its diet is more abundant and rarely ventures into the dense forest of the park.

The Canadian lynx (Lynx canadensis) is a wild feline from the boreal forest that lives in varied habitats dominated by mature stand forests. It is one of the three wild felines that live in Canada with the bobcat to which it resembles much and the cougar. This carnivore feeds mainly on snowshoe hares that are found in the park. Thus the Grands-Jardins National Park is a suitable habitat for this species. On the other hand, it is a shy and secretive feline since it is rarely observed.

The Cooper's lemming vole (Synaptomys cooperi) is a small rodent that frequents wetlands. It lives in burrows in peat bogs and grassy marshes. It is a rare species in Canada that has been very little studied to date.

=== Birds ===
The park is also home to a significant number of migratory and non-migratory bird species. The common loon, golden eagle, black-backed woodpecker, Barrow's goldeneye, peregrine falcon, Bicknell's thrush and spruce grouse are among the birds found here.

The common loon, a skilled diver, lives in fish-rich lakes since it is a great predator of aquatic environments. Its presence indicates good health of the lakes it frequents. The golden eagle, meanwhile, lives in rock walls and open or semi-open environments. The peregrine falcon also lives in the rock faces and open spaces of the national park. The black-backed woodpecker plays an important role in burnt forests since it creates cavities in dead trees in order to feed on the insects that adore this environment. The cavities thus created are then used for several species. The Bicknell's thrush which is a forest bird prefers rather dense and regenerating forests as habitat. The Barrow's goldeneye (Bucephala islandica), an arboreal nesting bird, lives in large snags for nesting and fishless lakes as a source of food for ducklings. Finally, the Canadian grouse, resembling a small hen, inhabits coniferous forests year-round. It is a species easily observable by visitors, accumulating 10% of reported wildlife sightings.

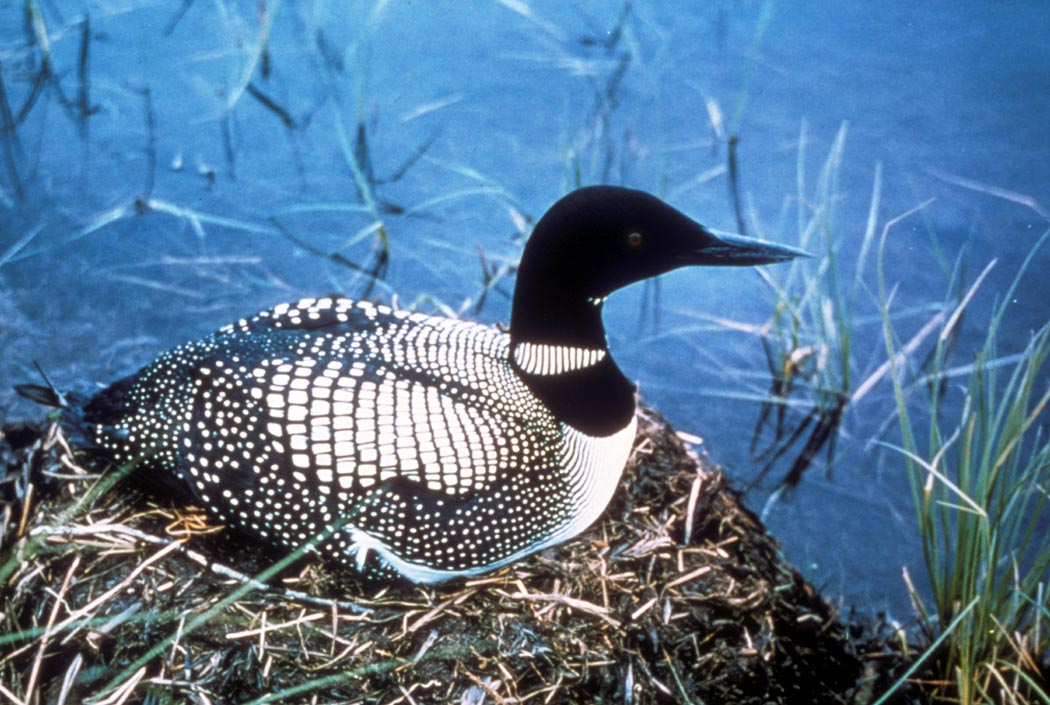
Common loon

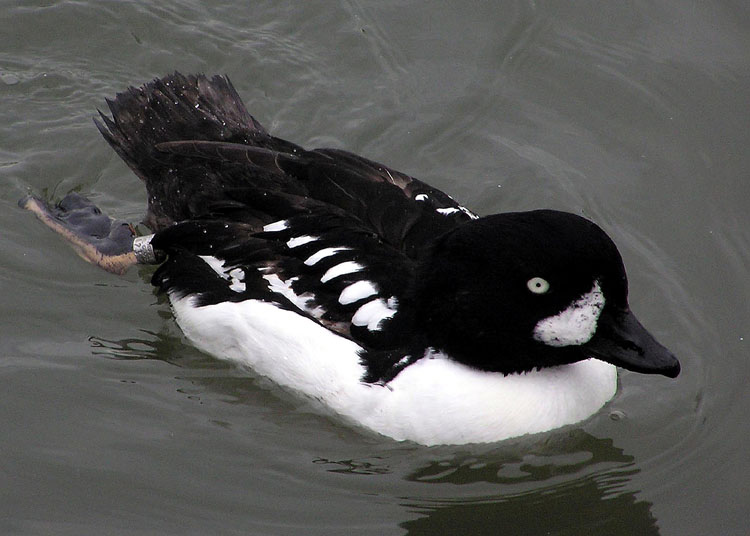
Barrow's goldeneye

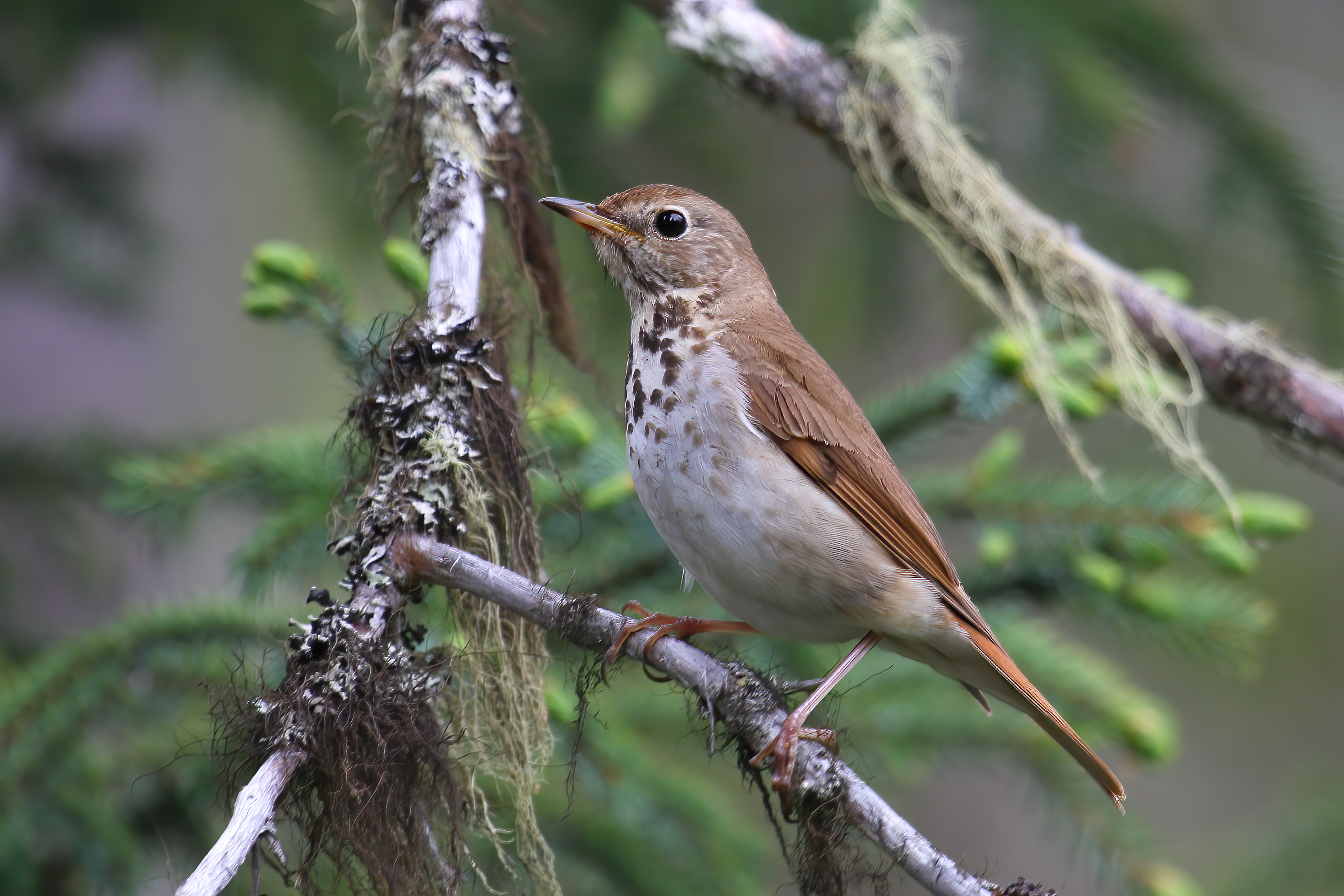
Hermit thrush

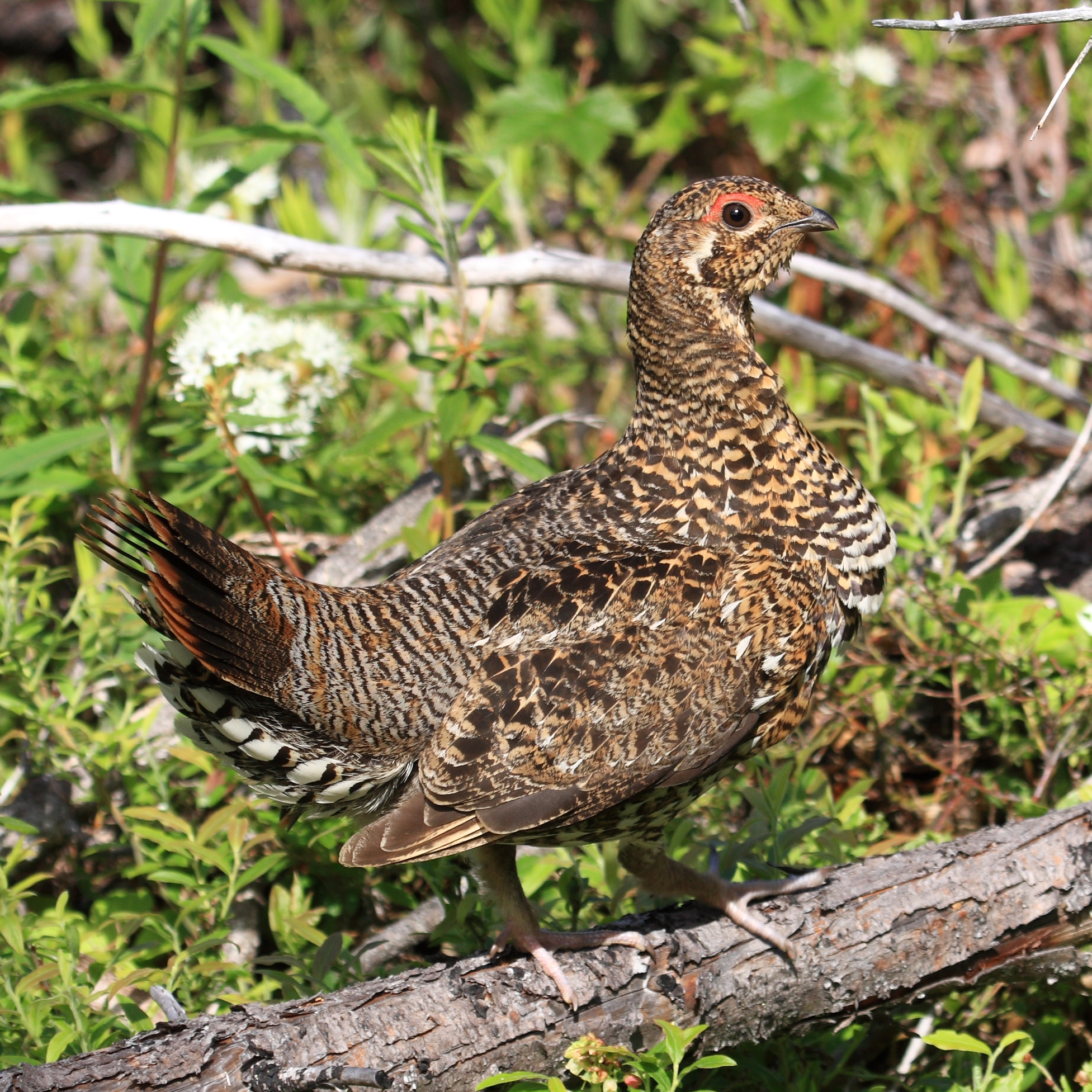
Spruce grouse

Click on images to enlarge

=== Marine fauna ===
Lakes and other marine environments are interesting habitats for a variety of amphibians (plethodontidae, bufonidae, hylidae, ranidae and colubridae species) and fish. Among the amphibians, we find the northern two-lined salamander, American toad, spring peeper (cruciferous tree frog, wood frog, green frog, the northern frog and finally the common garter snake. Arctic char and brook trout are two species of fish that frequent the national park.

== Flora ==
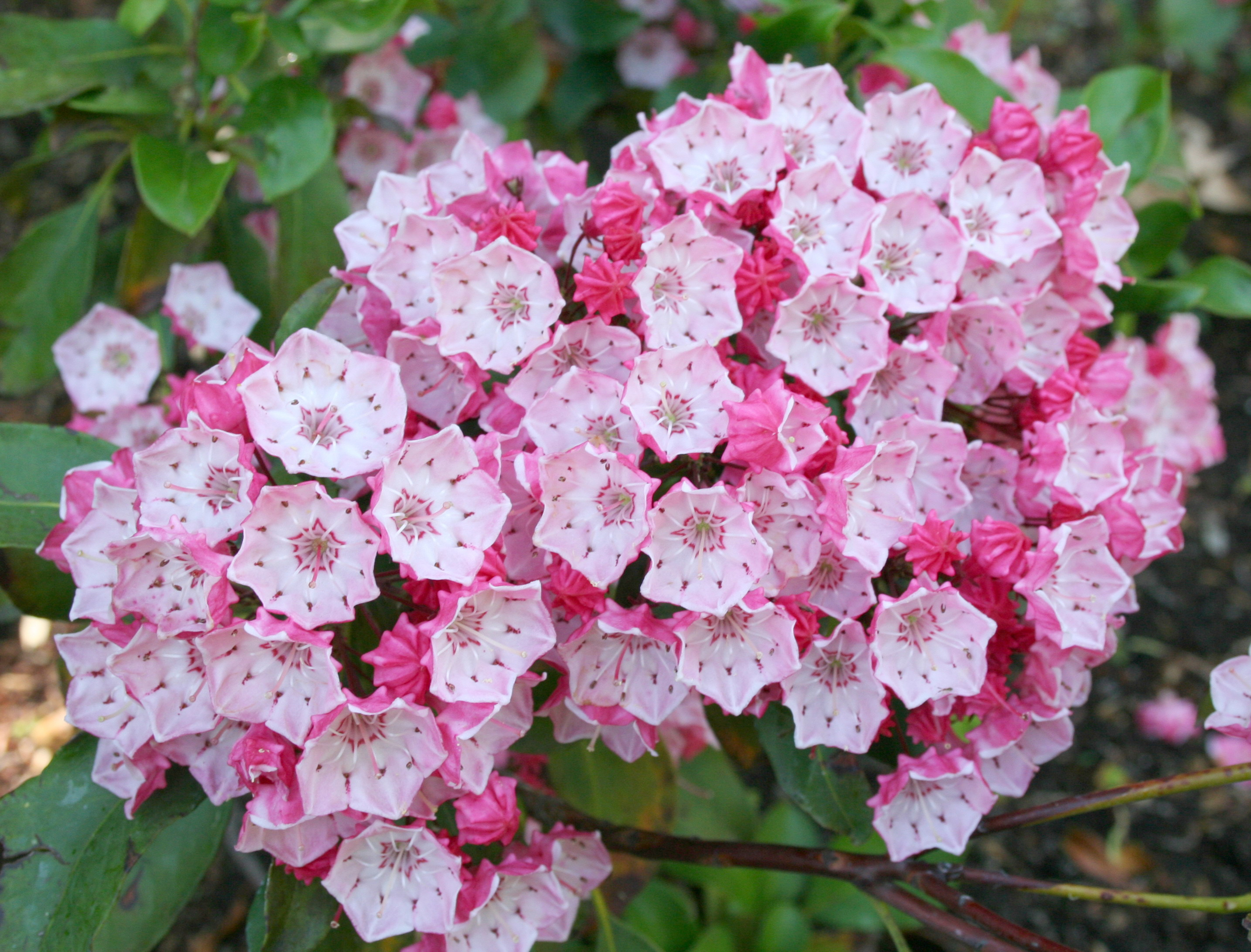
Kalmia latifolia 'Clementine Churchill'

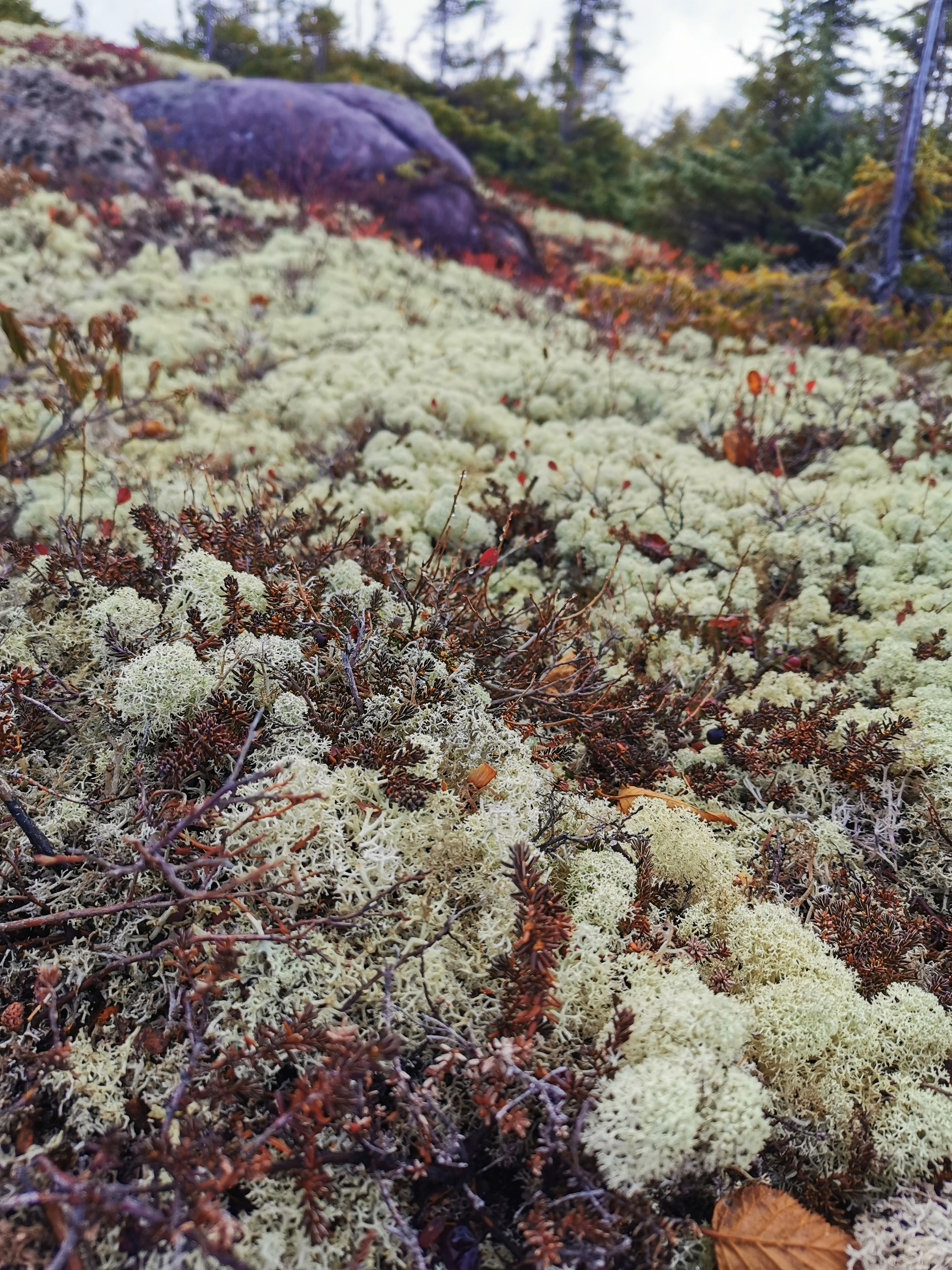
Lichens cladoni

The park is made up of different habitats due to its diverse topography, going from high mountains to large lakes. This is why we find there forest habitats which dominate the landscape, open habitats, taiga habitats composed mainly of lichens as well as varied aquatic habitats. The park helps protect a site of exceptional character that are cladonia spruces, a sample of taiga which is unique for southern Quebec. This type of habitat is normally found further north in Quebec. These different types of habitats are home to a wide variety of plants from four different categories: heather, lichen, bog and trees.

About fifteen species of the heather family are observable in the park. Their flowering extends from the beginning of June until the end of the summer. One of the most easily observable flowers is probably the narrow-leaved Kalmia (Kalmia augustifolia), which has pink saucer-shaped flowers. The park is also home to Labrador tea (Rhododendron groenlandicum), a few varieties of cranberry (Vaccinium spp.) that produce blueberries and cranberries, the pirole with one flower (Moneses uniflora), wintergreen hispid (Gaultheria hispidula), glaucous Andromeda (Andromeda polifolia var. glaucophylla) and the leatherleaf or cassandra (Chamaedaphne calyculata). A second family of plants is very abundant in the park, that of the lichen which is represented in the Parc des Grands-Jardins by 200 different species. Different species colonize different parts of the park. Some lichens are more adapted to the soil while others colonize trees or rock walls. There are different species of crustacean and foliaceous lichens that grow mainly on rocks in the Bear Mountains and Swan Lake. Lichens of the Bryoria and Usnea type are found on mature trees in the boreal forest. Finally, fruiticulous lichens of the genus Cladoni grow directly on the ground. Lichens are an important component of the ecosystem since they are the main source of food for certain species, especially for woodland caribou in winter.

Two remarkable peat bogs are present on the territory of the national park. These are rare habitats for southern Quebec. The first peatland is the permafrost of Mont de l'ours and the second is the reticulated peatland of Lac Malbaie.

The trees in the park are mainly black spruce and balsam fir which are similar to the Canadian boreal forest. There are also larches and jack pines. The boreal forest, which is found in the national park, is dominated by conifers which are particularly well adapted to the harsh boreal climate. There are still some species of deciduous trees that are as well suited to the boreal climate as the aspen. This type of forest is very important for many of North America's migratory birds.

== Research and conservation project ==
Some research projects are currently taking place in the park and focus mainly on the many lakes present in Parc. The first is the restoration of tributaries and outlets from lakes to improve the quality of the spawning grounds, which is carried out in partnership with the Quebec Wildlife Foundation. The second is that of characterizing the emergence of insects on lakes. The third is the restoration of borrow pits abandoned since 2007, led by the team of Line Rochefort of the Faculty of Agriculture and Food Sciences at Laval University. The goal of the project is to accelerate the vegetal restoration of the borrow pits of the park created by the extraction of sand and gravel which have been abandoned for 40 years. The park is also the subject of a project to modify the park boundary in order to enlarge it and incorporate an interesting area for the conservation of five new peaks, six lakes and the habitat of the woodland caribou. The park team has also been carrying out a monitoring of the loon's nesting since 2007 and invites visitors to share their observations of the bird via observation sheets.

One of the main goals of the national park is the conservation of the natural environments of the Charlevoix region and the species that inhabit it. The protection of aquatic environments and peaks are major issues for Grands-Jardins National Park. Rigorous monitoring of fishing quotas, identification of spawning grounds and characterization of numerous water bodies allow the park to minimize the pressure on the aquatic ecosystem and promote a favorable environment for the populations of Arctic char and brook trout that depend on it. Marked trails and awareness of hikers reduce the anthropogenic impact on the fragile ecosystems of mountain peaks.

== See also ==
- Charlevoix Regional County Municipality
- Lac-Pikauba, an unorganized territory
- Malbaie River
- Petite rivière Malbaie
- Sainte-Anne River (Beaupré)
- Rivière du Chemin des Canots
- Rivière de l'Enfer
- Lac Sainte-Anne du Nord
- Malbaie Pond
- National Parks of Quebec
- National Parks of Canada
- Mont du Lac des Cygnes
