= Lac des Trois Caribous =

Lake in Lac-Croche, Quebec, Canada

- Location in Quebec
- Location: Lac-Croche, Capitale-Nationale
- Coordinates: 47.59611°N 72.15028°W
- Lake type: Natural
- Primary inflows: Discharge of Lac Besson, discharge of Lac la Foi, unidentified stream, discharge of lakes Adélard-Harvey and "du Faiseur de Pluie".
- Primary outflows: Rivière aux Castors Noirs (via "Lac de Travers")
- Basin countries: Canada
- Max. length: 4.7 km (2.9 mi)
- Max. width: 1.3 km (0.81 mi)
- Surface elevation: 407 m (1,335 ft)

The lac des Trois Caribous is the main body of water on the slope of the rivière aux Castors Noirs, located in Haute-Batiscanie in the unorganized territory of Lac-Croche, in the La Jacques-Cartier Regional County Municipality, in the administrative region of Capitale-Nationale, in Quebec, in Canada.

Forestry is the main economic activity in the sector; recreational activities, second.

The surface of Lac des Trois Caribous is generally frozen from the beginning of December to the end of March; however, safe circulation on the ice is generally from late December to early March.

== Geography ==
Lac des Trois Caribous has a length of 4.7 kilometres (2.9 mi), a width of 1.3 kilometres (0.81 mi) and an altitude of 407 metres (1,335 ft).

This landlocked lake enclosed between the mountains looks like a boomerang open to the west. Lac des Trois Caribous has four small islands. Tilney Bay, which forms the northwest part of the lake, receives discharge from the Faiseur de Pluie and Adélard-Harvey lakes from the west.

The mouth of Trois Caribous Lake is located 2.5 kilometres (1.6 mi) northeast of the summit of Lone Pine Mountain, 7.0 kilometres (4.3 mi) northeast of the railway Canadian National, 5.1 kilometres (3.2 mi) southwest of the limit of the Laurentides Wildlife Reserve, 11.5 kilometres (7.1 mi) east of village center of Lac-Édouard and 17.9 kilometres (11.1 mi) south-east of Saint-Henri Lake.

From the mouth of this lake, the current crosses part of Lac de Travers to the north, then descends on 8.1 kilometres (5.0 mi) following the course of the rivière aux Castors Noirs, in particular crossing the lac aux Biscuits. Finally, the current flows into the upper part of the Batiscan River which goes southward to the north-west shore of St. Lawrence River.

== Toponymy ==
The toponym "Lac des Trois Caribous" was formalized on December 5, 1968, at the Place Names Bank of the Commission de toponymie du Québec.

== See also ==
- Batiscanie
