= Lake of the Cross =

Lake in Lac-Édouard, Quebec, Canada

Lake of the Cross (Lac-Édouard)
- Location within Quebec
- Location: Quebec in Canada
- Coordinates: 47°37′04″N 72°13′49″W
- Type: natural
- Primary inflows: Batiscan River
- Primary outflows: Batiscan River
- Basin countries: Canada
- Settlements: Lac-Édouard

The Lake of the Cross is located in Upper Batiscanie, in the municipality of Lac-Édouard in La Tuque (census division), in the administrative region the Mauricie in province of Quebec, in Canada. Located about 10 kilometres (6.2 mi) (by water) of Lac Édouard (Quebec) which is the head of Batiscan River, the "Lake of the cross" is a segment of path of the Batiscan River, near Triton Club. This wild sector grew on forestry and tourism upon the arrival of the railway CNR (subdivision Lac-Saint-Jean) connecting Hervey-Jonction to Chambord (Lac Saint-Jean), through the Lac-Édouard, in the late 19th century.

== Toponymy ==
The French toponym "Lac à la croix" (Lake of the Cross) was formalized on December 5, 1968, at the Bank of place names in Commission de toponymie du Québec (Geographical Names Board of Quebec). The name of the lake is in harmony with the other place names located at the area east of the "Lake of the cross". These toponyms are tinged with Christianity Lake Charity which flows into the Batiscan River and its tributaries upstream: "Petite Charité 1" (Little Charity 1), "Petite Charité 2" (Little Charity 2), Lac l'Espérance (Lake of Hope) and "Lac Petite Espérance" (lake of Small Hope). While the "Lac de la foi" (lake of faith) (neighbor on the east side) flows eastward into Lake "Trois Caribou" (Three Caribou). These various lakes are connected by footpaths of the Lordship of Triton. The maps of the area still shows the layout of ancient paths connecting the lakes. The development of inter-lake trails and place names are similar to a good sector of pilgrimage that were once popular.

In addition, fifty kilometers (by water) separates the mouth of the lake to the Cross and the Island of the cross (Quebec) (downstream in the middle of the Batiscan).

In June 2013, the Bank of place names in Geographical Names Board of Canada has 60 homonyms related to "Lake of the Cross" 29 names "lac à la Croix" (Lake of the Cross), 12 "Lac en Croix" (Lake in Cross), 10 "Lac de la Croix" (Cross Lake), 3 "Lac la Croix" (Cross Lake), 5 "Petit Lac à la Croix" (Little Lake of the Cross) (including some variants in writing) and on "Lac La Croix". In addition, several other variants complicate the toponymy of Quebec and Canada: "Pointe à la Croix" (Tip of the Cross), "Rose-Croix" (Rosy Cross), Sainte-Croix (St. Croix), Anse-à-la-Croix (Anse of the Cross), "Chemin de la Croix" (Stations of the Cross), Ile-de-la-Croix (Island of the Cross), Montagne-de-la-Croix (mountain of the Cross), Pointe-de-la-Croix (Tip of the Cross), "Rivière de la Croix" (River of the Cross) and "rue de la Croix" (Street of the Cross).

== See also ==
- Batiscanie
- Cookies Lake
