= Rivière aux Castors Noirs =

- Location within Quebec

Location
- Country: Canada
- Province: Quebec
- Region: Capitale-Nationale, Mauricie
- Regional County Municipality and City: La Jacques-Cartier Regional County Municipality, La Tuque
- Unorganized territory: Lac-Croche

Physical characteristics
- Source: Lac à la Poêle
  - location: Lac-Croche
  - coordinates: 47°40′13″N 72°02′03″W
  - elevation: 483
- Mouth: Batiscan River
  - location: Lac-Édouard
  - coordinates: 47°36′58″N 72°12′58″W
  - elevation: 350 m

Basin features
- Tributaries
  - left: (Upward from the mouth) Ruisseau non identifié, décharge du Lac des Trois Caribous, ruisseau non identifié (via le lac Gauthier), ruisseau des Indiens (via le lac Gauthier), décharge (via le lac Gauthier) des lacs du Palier et du Casse-Ligne, décharge du lac Berners (via le Lac du Plan Perdu), décharge du lac Light (via le Lac du Plan Perdu), décharge du lac de l’Aval.
  - right: (Upward from the mouth) Décharge d’un lac non identifié (via le Lac aux Biscuits), Aberdeen River, décharge du lac aux Loutres, ruisseau, décharge du lac Gaston, décharge du lac Steers, ruisseau (via le lac Gauthier), décharge du lac Norrie (via le lac Gauthier), décharge du lac Pourpre (via le lac Gauthier), décharge du lac Iô (via le Lac du Plan Perdu), décharge du Lac de l’Angle.

The Rivière aux Castors Noirs (English: black beaver river) is a tributary of the Batiscan River, flowing in Haute-Batiscanie, in the province of Québec, Canada. This watercourse crosses:

- the unorganized territory of Lac-Croche which is part of the La Jacques-Cartier Regional County Municipality, in the administrative region of Capitale-Nationale;
- the municipality of Lac-Édouard which is part of the La Tuque, in the administrative region of Mauricie.

This river is located entirely in the forest zone in the Laurentides Wildlife Reserve, near its western limit. This hydrographic slope is served by some forest roads.

Forestry is the main economic activity in the sector; recreational activities, second.

The surface of the Black Beaver River (except the rapids areas) is generally frozen from the beginning of December to the end of March, but safe circulation on the ice is generally made from the end of December to the beginning of March. The water level of the river varies with the seasons and the precipitation.

== Geography ==
The Black Beaver River originates from "Lac à la Poêle" (length: 2.6 kilometres (1.6 mi); altitude: 483 metres (1,585 ft)) in the unorganized territory of Lac-Croche. This long lake is mainly fed by the outlet of Lac de la Queue, the outlet of Lake Cos, the outlet of Lake Dabin and the outlet of Lake Tretté. Its outfall is located at the bottom of a bay in the northwestern part of the lake.

The course of the river straddles the boundary of the administrative regions of Capitale-Nationale and Mauricie.

The "rivière aux Castors Noirs" flows to the bottom of a bay on the north shore of a lake formed by the widening of the Batiscan River. This confluence is located 2.1 kilometres (1.3 mi) from the Canadian National railway, 4.5 kilometres (2.8 mi) west of Lac des Trois Caribous and 6.4 kilometres (4.0 mi) south-east of the center of the village of Lac-Édouard.

== Toponymy ==
The toponym "Rivière aux Castors Noirs" was formalized on December 5, 1968 in the Place Names Bank of the Commission de toponymie du Québec.

== See also ==
- La Jacques-Cartier Regional County Municipality
- Lac-Édouard, a municipality
- Lac-Croche, an unorganized territory
- Lac des Trois Caribous
- Lac aux Biscuits
- Laurentides Wildlife Reserve
- Batiscanie
- Batiscan River
- Aberdeen River
- List of rivers of Quebec
