= Mount Raoul Blanchard =

Mountain in Quebec, Canada

Coordinates: 47°19′N 70°50′W

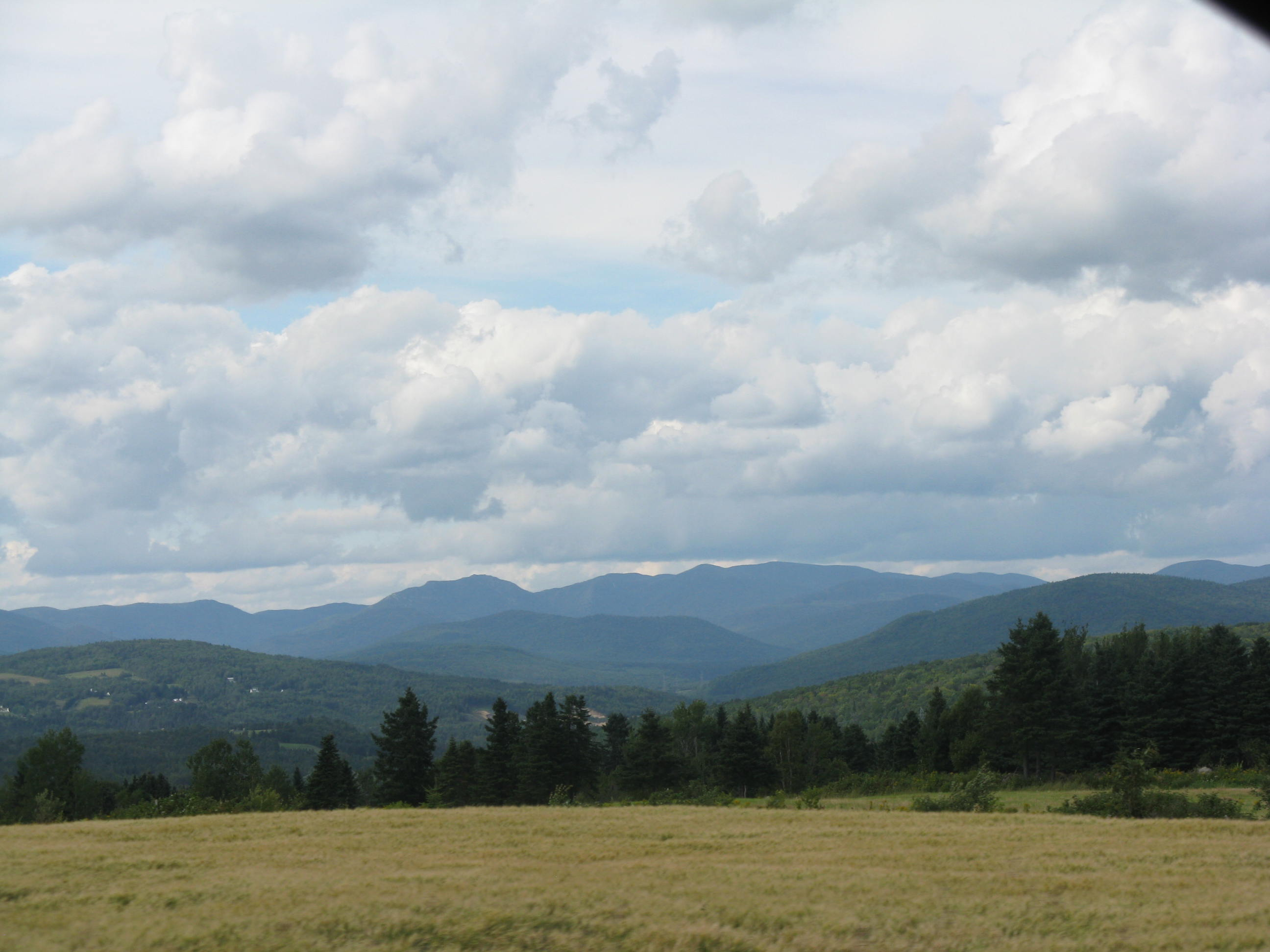
Mont Raoul-Blanchard seen from route 138 in St-Tite-des-Caps

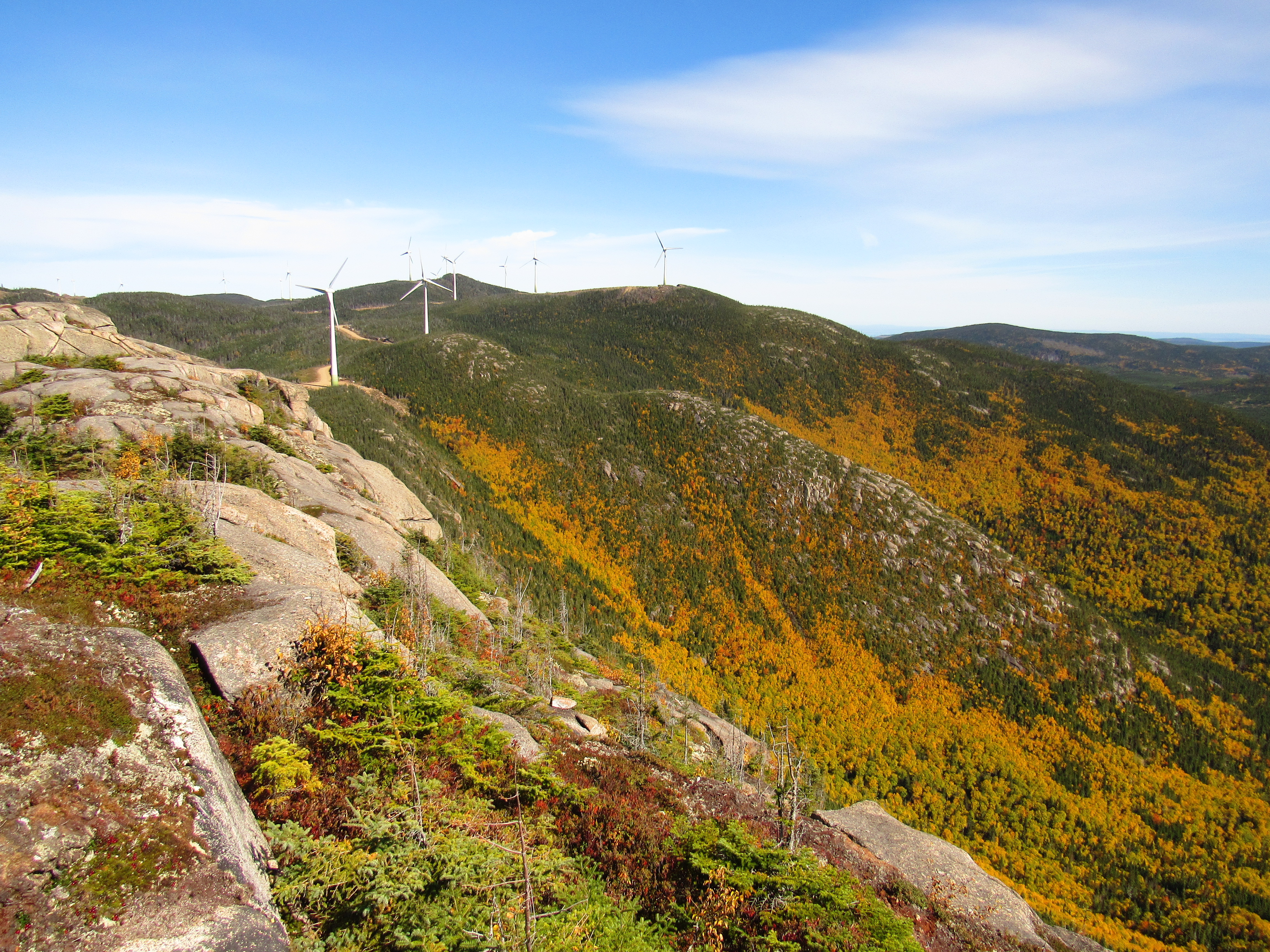
Mount Raoul-Blanchard and the wind farm

Mount Raoul Blanchard (French: Mont Raoul-Blanchard) is the highest peak in the Laurentian Mountains, Quebec, Canada at 1,166 m (3,825 ft). It is located in the La Côte-de-Beaupré RCM, 64 kilometres (40 mi) north east of Quebec City and 19 kilometres (12 mi) north of Saint-Tite-des-Caps in the Réserve faunique des Laurentides.

The peak is named after Raoul Blanchard (1877-1965), a geographer who had significant interest in the French Alps and the mountains of Quebec.

The summit is actually not accessible because it is located on the Seigneurie de Beaupré, a relic of the feodal system, which is land that is owned by the Séminaire de Québec,
