= Laurentian Mountains =

Mountain range in Canada

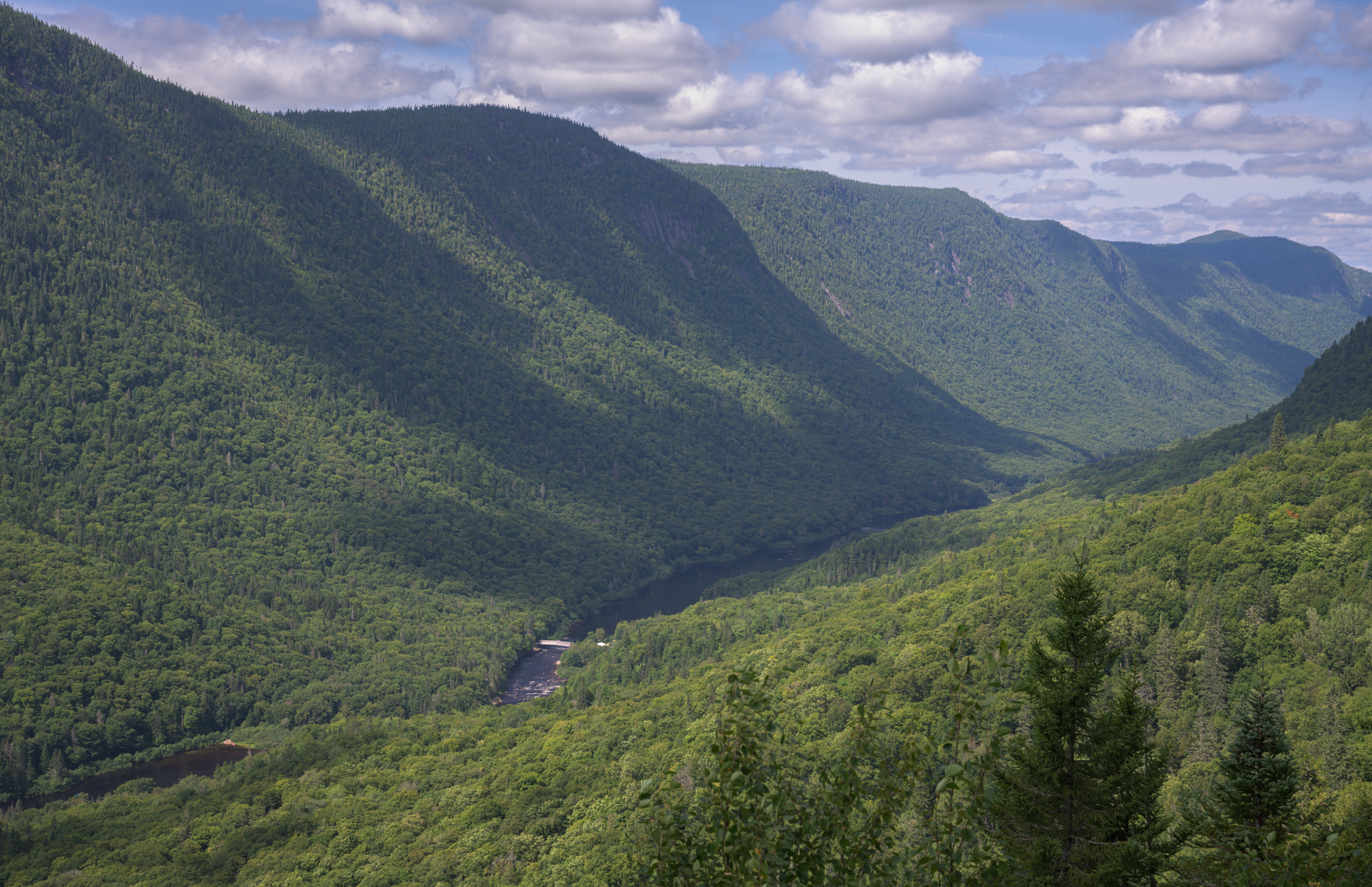
- Jacques-Cartier Massif, as seen from Jacques-Cartier National Park

Highest point
- Peak: Mount Raoul Blanchard
- Elevation: 1,166 m (3,825 ft)
- Coordinates: 47°18′34″N 70°49′57″W

Dimensions
- Length: 1,400 km (900 mi)

Geography
- Country: Canada
- Province: Quebec; Newfoundland and Labrador; Ontario
- Range coordinates: 50°28′49.17″N 68°20′11.13″W

Geology
- Orogeny: Grenville orogeny
- Rock age: Precambrian
- Rock types: Igneous; metamorphic

The Laurentian Mountains, also known as the Laurentians or Laurentides, are a mountain range in Canada. The range is 1,400 km (900 mi) long and ranges in height from 500 m (1,600 ft) with peaks over 1,000 m (3,300 ft). The Laurentian Mountains extend across Labrador and Quebec within the Laurentian Upland, which contains foothills in northeastern Ontario. The range is located near the rivers of Ottawa, St. Lawrence, and Saguenay. The Laurentian Mountains primarily stretch across multiple regions in Quebec, with geologic formations such as the Jacques-Cartier Massif located within the range.

The Laurentians Mountains are one of the oldest mountain ranges on earth. The range formed around one billion years ago during the Grenville orogeny, in which the Grenville Province formed, a subdivision of the Canadian Shield. During that time, Laurentia, the geologic core of the Canadian Shield, collided with other continents and formed Precambrian rocks which extend across the range. The mountain range is located around other related geographic features, such as the Monteregian Hills and the Adirondack Mountains.

The Laurentian Mountains are home to vast extents of boreal ecosystems and mixed forests. The southern areas of the range are dominated by black spruce and balsam fir, with areas of white birch. The range is home to various wildlife species. The Laurentian Mountains are an important part of the economy of Quebec, as they have been historically been used for forestry and provide access to tourism and outdoor recreation for people in the region.

== Etymology ==
The namesake of the mountains is derived from the term "Laurentide" or "Laurentian", which is itself derived from the St. Lawrence River. François-Xavier Garneau, author of Histoire de Canada, was first to use the term "Laurentien" when he coined the name of the mountains in 1845. Early geologists adopted the name for the complex of metamorphic and igneous rocks in this area, with the terms further being applied to the Laurentide Ice Sheet and the Laurentian Shield (Canadian Shield). Garneau applied the new term to the whole range north of the St. Lawrence River. While the region has been popularly referred to as the Laurentians and Les Laurentides, it was officially adopted in 1987 as the territory was defined.

== Geography ==
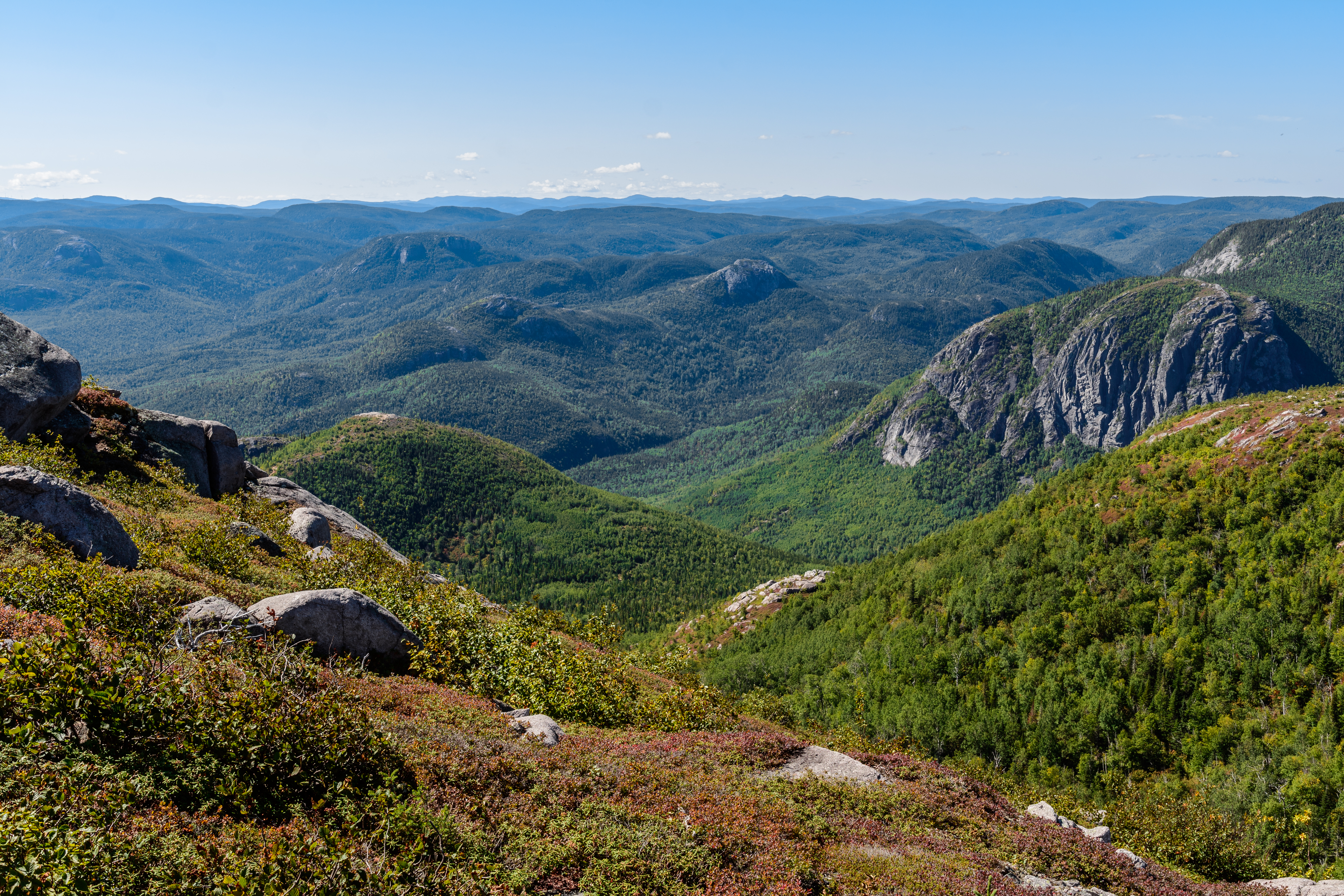
View of the range from Grands-Jardins National Park

The Laurentian Mountains extend from Quebec to Labrador over a distance of 1,448 kilometers (900 miles). They are partially bounded by the Ottawa, St. Lawrence, and Saguenay River. The Laurentian Mountains reside in the Laurentian Upland, which extends as far west as Lake Huron, with foothills extending into northeastern Ontario. Sub-ranges in the upland are the Opeongo Hills, Misquah Hills, Huron Mountains, and the Porcupine Mountains. This region is extensively forested and contains nearly untouched wilderness, with it not being suited for agriculture.

One of Quebec's official regions is called Laurentides. The mountain range runs through four other regions; Capitale-Nationale, Outaouais, Lanaudière, and Mauricie. The elevation generally ranges from around 500 m (1,640 ft) to 1,000 m (3,280 ft) with Mont Raoul-Blanchard being its highest peak, at 1,166 m (3,825 ft). Mont Tremblant, Mont Bleu, and Mont des Conscrits are other prominent peaks in the mountain range. Jacques-Cartier National Park is located in this mountain range, which is north of Quebec City, residing in the Jacques-Cartier Massif. The Adirondack Mountains, which are located in northeastern New York, have great similarity to the Laurentian Mountains, consisting of the same type of rocks that are part of the Canadian Shield.

== Geology ==
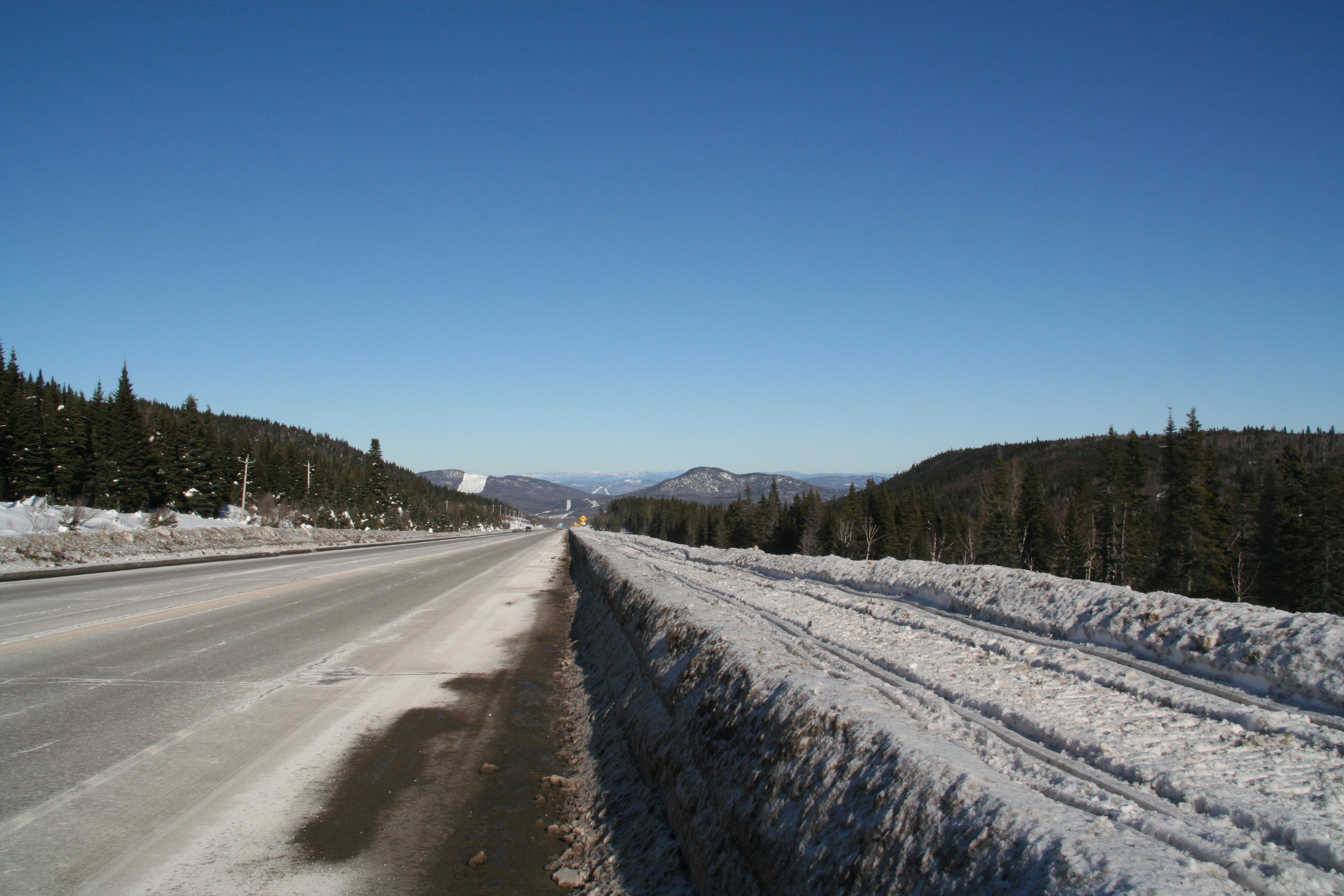
Laurentian Mountains, Route 138, Quebec, Canada

The Laurentian Mountains are one of the oldest mountain ranges in the world, being of Precambrian age, with some regions dating to over one billion years old. The mountain range is between other related geologic features, such as the Monteregian Hills and the older Oka Hills. The mountain range is located within the Grenville orogeny. The rocks of the Laurentian Mountains contain deformation and metamorphic structures that show long periods of tectonic activity occurred. The Grenville Province is a subdivision of the Canadian Shield, and in this area, the oldest rocks of this geologic region are found. These rocks represent a chain of mountains that formed between 1,500 and 900 million years ago. During that time, Laurentia, the geologic core of the Canadian Shield, collided with other continents that were dragged by moving tectonic plates.

== Ecology ==
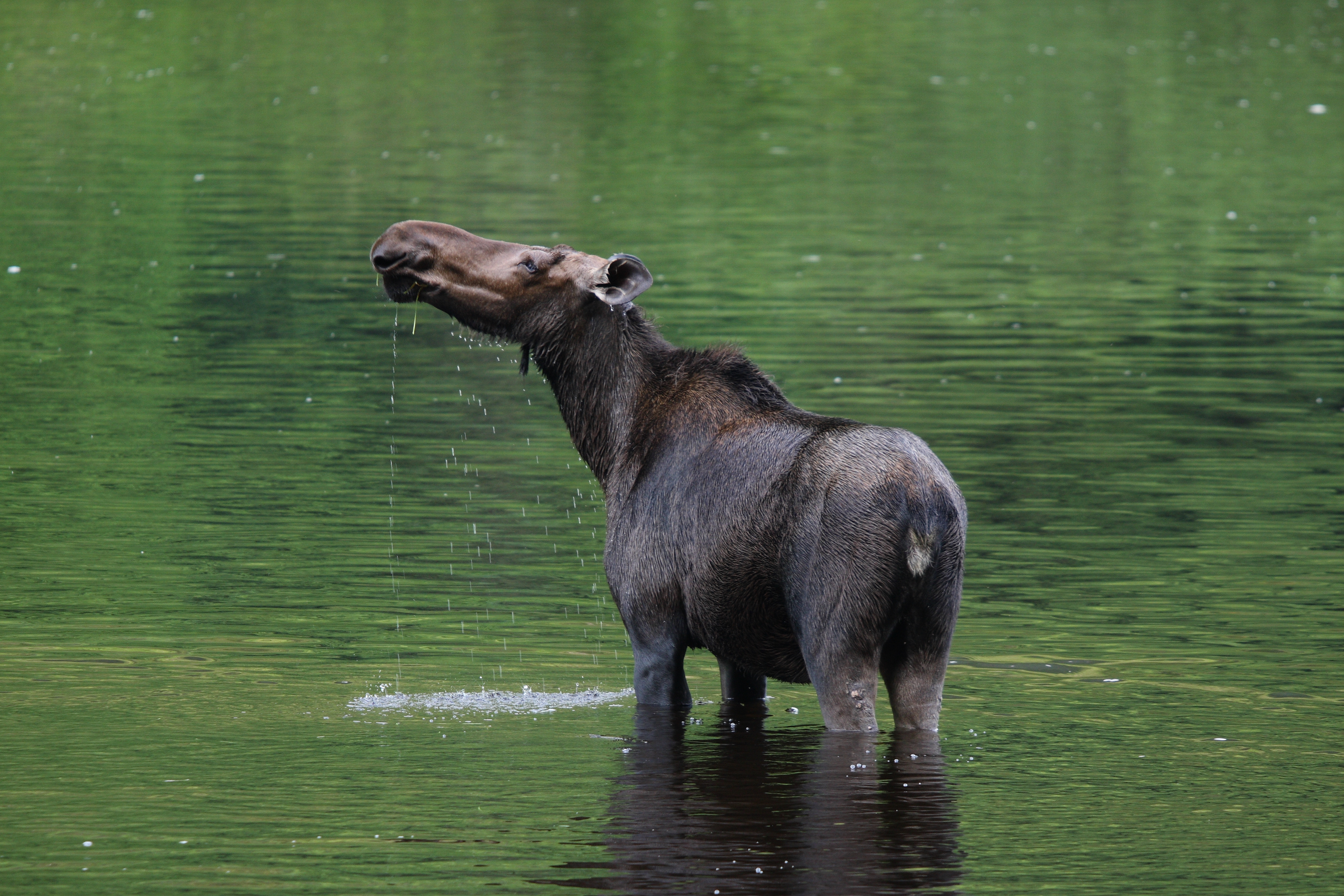
Female moose at Jacques-Cartier National Park

The Laurentian Mountains contain dense boreal forests. It is home to some deciduous trees, such as sugar maple, beech, but are rarely found past the northern boundary of the range. The Laurentian region is also rich in walnut, ash, cherry, linden, and oak. The range also contains bogs. The boreal ecosystem is represented by mixed forests, dominated by black spruce and balsam fir to the south, including areas of white birch. Laurentides Wildlife Reserve, which is located in the range, contains mammals such as black bears, bobcats, raccoons, grey wolves, otters, moose, white-tailed deer and caribou, with birds such as the barred owl, American kestrel, and osprey.

== Economy ==
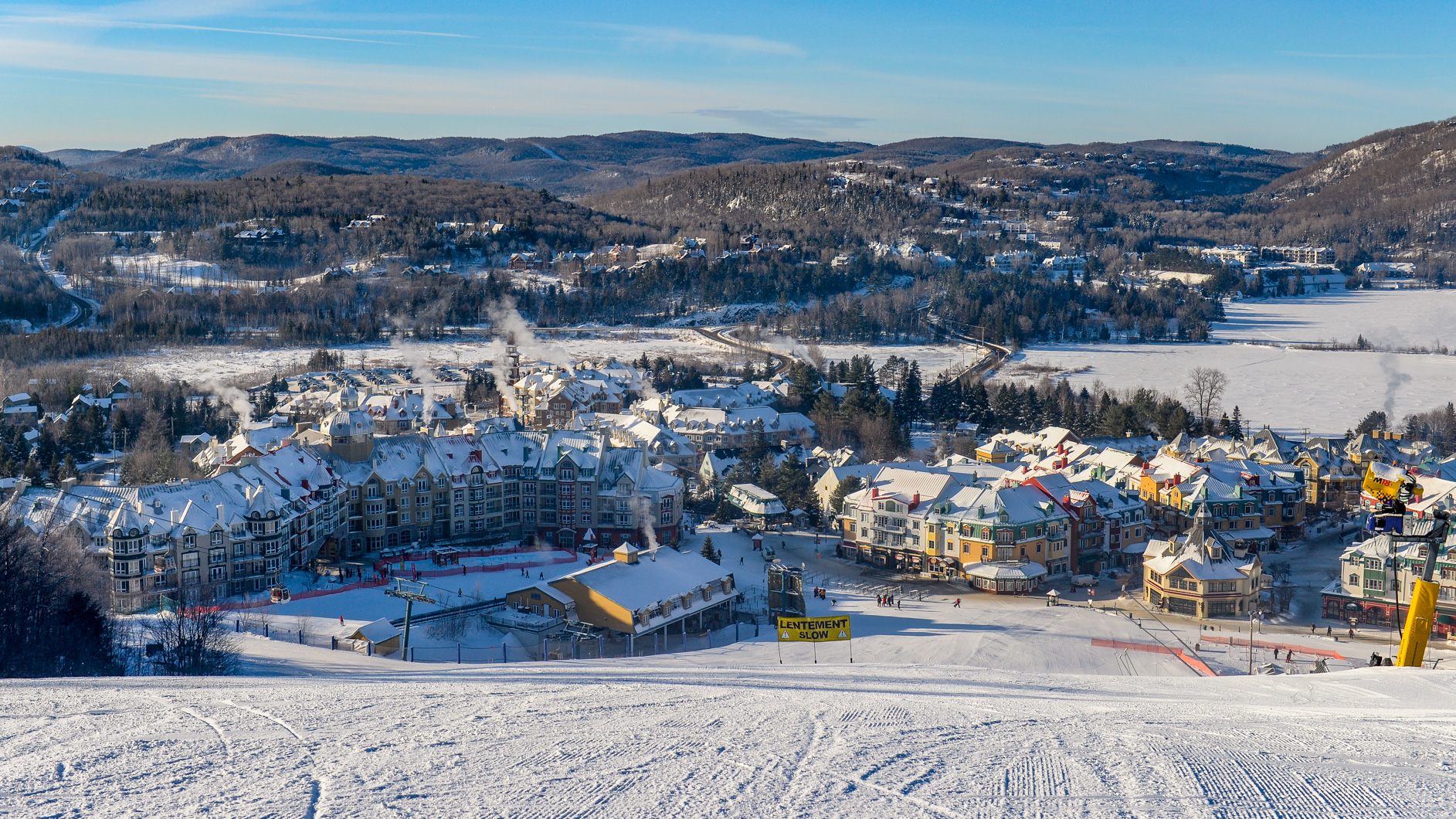
Mont-Tremblant in 2015

=== Tourism ===
The Laurentian Mountains are a popular recreational destination in Quebec. The first ski lift in North America was built in the mountain range in 1931, and by the late 1930s, "snow trains" had brought tens of thousands of skiers to the range. In the area, there is skiing, snowboarding, dog sledding, ice climbing, and snowmobiling during winter at Mont-Tremblant, with rafting, kayaking, hiking, camping, and golf through the region during spring, summer, and fall.

=== Forestry ===
The Laurentian Mountains have been historically used for logging. During the European colonization of North America, colonists were met with a woodland that stretched from the East Coast to the Great Lakes. The forests reached heights of 30 to 85 meters high. While the exports of logging grew, it eventually became a wasteful practice, with the felling of trees leaving huge portions of land vulnerable to erosion. Intensive forestry has not entirely ceased in the region. Public and private forests in Quebec have now been entirely mapped, with information such as the soil, terrain, and waterways, and the species and the age of the trees available. With this data, the chief forester calculates the amount of wood that can be harvested, ensuring the forest is not cut down faster than it can grow back.

== See also ==
- List of mountain ranges of Quebec
- Laurentian Upland
- Mealy Mountains
- Chic-Choc Mountains
