= Lac aux Biscuits =

Lake in Lac-Édouard, Quebec, Canada

Cookies Lake
- "Lac aux Biscuits", in Lac-Édouard, Quebec (municipality), in Batiscanie, in Quebec
- Coordinates: 47.636°N 72.210°W
- Primary outflows: Batiscan River
- Basin countries: Canada
- Max. length: 2.4 km (1.5 mi)
- Max. width: 0.8 km (0.50 mi)
- Surface elevation: 106 m (348 ft)
- Settlements: Lac-Édouard, Quebec

The lac aux Biscuits (Cookies Lake) (formerly named "Lac à la Croix" in French or Cross Lake in English) is located in Haute-Batiscanie in the municipality of Lac-Édouard, Quebec, in La Tuque, in the administrative region of the Mauricie, in the province of Quebec, Canada. The watershed discharge of "Lac aux Biscuits" (Cookies Lake) is 247 km², the sixth largest pool of Batiscanie.

== Geography ==
"Cookies lake" (lac aux Biscuits, in French) has a length of 2.4 km and a width of 0.8 km (until bottom of the large bay located north of the lake). Its mouth is located at the south-west of the lake and its waters discharge into a small river of 2.4 km, which drains into another lake that is part the Batiscan River.

"Cookies lake" is located at 5.6 km southeast of the village of Lac-Édouard, Quebec, at 48 km north-east of La Tuque. Its mouth is at 0.7 km northeast of Lac-à-la-Croix and north-east of "Club Triton" in the Seigneurie du Triton. Excluding the North bay, the shape of lake is akin to a growing open towards the southeast, surrounding the lake John-Bull, located close. The "Blueberries Island" (Île aux Bleuets) is located almost at the middle of the lake, opposite to the outlet of John-Bull lake.

"Cookies Lake" is fed in North-East by two rivers:

- "Lake Cleveland" outlet (at North-East),
- "Travers River" (in the East), which takes its source at "Travers Lake". The latter lake is especially powered by the "Lake of the Three Caribou" (west) and by the Gauthier Lake (in the East) .

"Cookies Lake" is located at the extreme West of sub-watershed the same name. This sub-watershed covers 243.39 square kilometres (93.97 sq mi) and fact part of the head the waters of the Batiscanie, Quebec, constituting the sub-basin the more north of the Batiscanie, Quebec. This sub-basin includes dozens of lakes such as Aberdeen (the level of water is to 430 m altitude), Witherbee, Cleveland, McMilen, Lispenard, of "Plan Perdu" (Lost Plan) ... "Cookies Lake" is located entirely in a forest environment and is surrounded by high mountains on the northern side. Its surface is frozen normally from November to April. The level of water from "Cookies Lake" is in 348 metres (1,142 ft) of altitude (compared to 363 metres (1,191 ft) for the Lac-Édouard, Quebec). By the elevation of the sub-watershed of "Cookies Lake" upper waterbodies, is considered a second head of the Batiscan River.

== Toponymy ==
The toponym "Cookies Lake" (Lac aux biscuits) was formalized as of December 5, 1968 in the Bank of place names of the Commission de toponymie du Québec.

== History ==
The sector "Lac aux Biscuits" really started to be exploited thanks to railway built to the any late 19th century, connecting Hervey-Jonction, Quebec to Chambord, Quebec passing by the Lac-Édouard, Quebec. Travellers and forest workers used mostly the "Gare du Triton", located in the Lordship of Triton (Seigneurie-du-Triton). The "Cookies Lake" is especially characterized by forestry cuts conceded by the Government of Quebec, as well as hunting and fishing.

== See also ==
- Lake of the cross (Lac-Édouard)
