= Sautauriski =

Sautauriski may refer to:

- Sautauriski Lake, Lac-Jacques-Cartier, Quebec, Canada
- Sautauriski Mountain a mountain in Jacques-Cartier National Park, Quebec, Canada
- Sautauriski River, Stoneham-et-Tewkesbury, Quebec, Canada
