= Fragasso =

Fragasso may refer to:

== Persons ==
- Claudio Fragasso (born 1951), a director and screenwriter from Italy
- Michel Fragasso (1888–1954), an engineer from Italy who immigrated to Quebec, Canada

== Toponyms ==
- Fragasso Lake, a body of water in Jacques-Cartier National Park, Quebec, Canada
