= Archambault Lake =

Archambault Lake or Lac Archambault may refer to:

- Archambault Lake (Saint-Donat), Lanaudière, Québec, Canada
- Archambault Lake (Lac-Jacques-Cartier), La Côte-de-Beaupré Regional County Municipality, Capitale-Nationale, Québec, Canada
