= Lac à la Chute =

Lake in Capitale-Nationale, Quebec, Canada

- Location in Quebec
- Location: Lac-Jacques-Cartier (TNO), La Côte-de-Beaupré Regional County Municipality, Capitale-Nationale
- Coordinates: 47.31166°N 71.32278°W
- Lake type: Natural
- Primary inflows: (clockwise from the mouth) Discharge of lac du Lièvre, décharge du lac Kewe, discharge of lac Cauchon and discharge of lac Guay.
- Primary outflows: Discharge of the lake going to rivière à la Chute
- Basin countries: Canada
- Max. length: 3.3 km (2.1 mi)
- Max. width: 0.7 km (0.43 mi)
- Surface elevation: 653 m (2,142 ft)

Lac à la Chute (English: Lake of the Fall) is a freshwater body on the hydrographic side of rivière à la Chute, located in the unorganized territory of Lac-Jacques-Cartier, in the MRC La Côte-de-Beaupré Regional County Municipality, Quebec, Canada.

Lac à la Chute is located in Jacques-Cartier National Park. Its southern half is located in the canton of Cauchon.

The Lac à la Chute watershed is mainly served on the east side by the route 175 which links the cities of Quebec City and Saguenay. A few secondary roads serve this area for forestry and recreational tourism activities.

Forestry is the main economic activity in the sector; recreotourism activities, second.

The surface of Lac de la Chute is generally frozen from the beginning of December to the end of March; safe circulation on the ice is generally done from the end of December to the beginning of March.

== Geography ==
Lac à la Chute has a length of 3.3 kilometres (2.1 mi), a width of 0.7 kilometres (0.43 mi) and its surface is at an altitude of 653 metres (2,142 ft). This lake sunk between the mountains is made in length, resembling a woolen sock whose part of the toes is oriented towards the northeast. The course of the Sautauriski River is located at 2.9 kilometres (1.8 mi) on the east side of the lake; and the course of the rivière à la Chute is at 2.4 kilometres (1.5 mi) on the west side of the lake.

From the mouth of Lac à la Chute, the current goes consecutively first to the outlet of the lake over 4.8 kilometres (3.0 mi) generally towards the southwest in a deep valley; on 7.3 kilometres (4.5 mi) southwards following the course of the rivière à la Chute; on 4.6 kilometres (2.9 mi) towards the southwest by following the course of the Sautauriski River; then on generally towards the south along the current of the Jacques-Cartier River to the northeast bank of the Saint-Laurent river.

The lake has an area of 1.4 square kilometres (0.54 sq mi). It is the second largest of the 216 bodies of water in Jacques-Cartier National Park.

== Toponymy ==
The toponym "lac à la Chute" is directly linked to the rivière à la Chute into which the outlet of the lake flows. This denomination appears on cartographic documents at least since the end of the 19th century, in particular - in the form "L. at the Fall" - on the map of "Parc National des Laurentides" dating from April 30, 1896.

The toponym lac de la chute was formalized on December 5, 1968, by the Commission de toponymie du Québec.

== See also ==
- Jacques-Cartier National Park
- La Côte-de-Beaupré Regional County Municipality
- Lac-Jacques-Cartier, an unorganized territory
- Rivière à la Chute
- Sautauriski River
- Jacques-Cartier River
- List of lakes of Canada

== Bibliography ==
- Corporation du bassin de la Jacques-Cartier (2013). Plan directeur de l'eau de la zone de gestion intégrée de l'eau de la Jacques-Cartier (PDF). p. 391..
