= Fragasso Lake =

Lake in Quebec, Canada

- Location in Quebec
- Location: Lac-Jacques-Cartier (TNO), La Côte-de-Beaupré Regional County Municipality, Capitale-Nationale
- Coordinates: 47.36611°N 71.31111°W
- Lake type: Natural
- Primary inflows: Five small mountain streams
- Primary outflows: Discharge going to Walsh Lake (Lac-Jacques-Cartier), then lac des Alliés which is crossed by Rocheuse River
- Basin countries: Canada
- Max. length: 1.5 km (0.93 mi)
- Max. width: 0.6 km (0.37 mi)
- Surface elevation: 751 m (2,464 ft)

The Lac Fragasso is a freshwater body at the head of a branch leading to the Rocheuse River via Walsh Lake and lac des Alliés, flowing in Jacques-Cartier National Park. This lake is located entirely in the unorganized territory of Lac-Jacques-Cartier, in the La Côte-de-Beaupré Regional County Municipality, administrative region of Capitale-Nationale, in province of Quebec, in Canada.

The watershed of lake Fragasso is mainly served on the east side by the route 175 which connects the cities of Quebec and Saguenay. A secondary road serves the northern part of the lake for the needs of forestry and recreational tourism; while forest road 12 passes south in the area between Lake Fragasso and Lake Walsh.

The main economic activity in the sector is forestry, followed by recreational tourism.

The surface of Lake Fragasso is generally frozen from the beginning of December to the end of March; safe circulation on the ice is generally done from the end of December to the beginning of March.

== Geography ==
Lake Fragasso has a length of 1.5 kilometres (0.93 mi), a width of 0.6 kilometres (0.37 mi) and its surface is at an altitude of 751 metres (2,464 ft). This lake between the mountains resembles a footprint imprinted in the sand.

The Sautauriski Lake is located 0.4 kilometres (0.25 mi) on the northeast side of Lake Fragasso; the lac Walsh is located 0.3 kilometres (0.19 mi) on the southwest side of the lake; and the course of the Jacques-Cartier River goes to 6.6 kilometres (4.1 mi) on the west side of the lake.

From the mouth of lake Fragasso, the current first descends on 0.3 kilometres (0.19 mi) to reach Walsh Lake, then successively on 0.44 kilometres (0.27 mi) westwards crossing Walsh Lake, on 1.2 kilometres (0.75 mi) to the west, then branches off to the north, where the water discharges at the bottom of the west bay of lac des Alliés. From there, the current goes up on 1.3 kilometres (0.81 mi) towards the north, to join the current coming from the discharge of the Rocheuse River (coming from the north). Then, the current from the latter crosses 2.7 kilometres (1.7 mi) to the west of the Lac des Alliés to its mouth. From there, the current successively follows the course of the Rocheuse River on 3.8 kilometres (2.4 mi); on 4.6 kilometres (2.9 mi) towards the southwest by following the course of the rivière du Malin; then on generally towards the south along the current of the Jacques-Cartier river to the northeast bank of the Saint-Laurent River.

== Toponymy ==
This toponym appears on a forest map of 1928. From 1930, this toponym was replaced by the name "Fossambault Lake" whose justification could not be established; consequently, in 1990, the Commission de toponymie du Québec adopted the old designation, now the only official one.

This toponym evokes the life work of Michel Fragasso (1888-1954), originally from Carignola, in the province of Foggia, in Italy. After completing his engineering studies in Liège, the latter immigrated to Quebec in 1912. In addition to having participated in the construction of the Quebec Bridge around 1913, this engineer erected several dams, notably those at Jacques-Cartier lakes in the Laurentides Wildlife Reserve, and Sautauriski, located in Jacques-Cartier National Park. Michel Fragasso had married Clara Taché, daughter of the architect Eugène-Étienne Taché, author of the plans for the Parliament of Quebec, the Armory of Quebec as well as the motto of Quebec: "Je me souviens".

The toponym "lac Fragasso" was formalized on October 19, 1990, by the Commission de toponymie du Québec.

== See also ==
- Jacques-Cartier National Park
- La Côte-de-Beaupré Regional County Municipality
- Lac-Jacques-Cartier, an unorganized territory
- Walsh Lake
- Lac des Alliés
- Rocheuse River
- Rivière du Malin
- Jacques-Cartier River
- List of lakes of Canada
