= 1943 Saint-Donat RCAF Liberator III crash =

Aviation incident in Canada

1943 Saint-Donat Liberator III crash
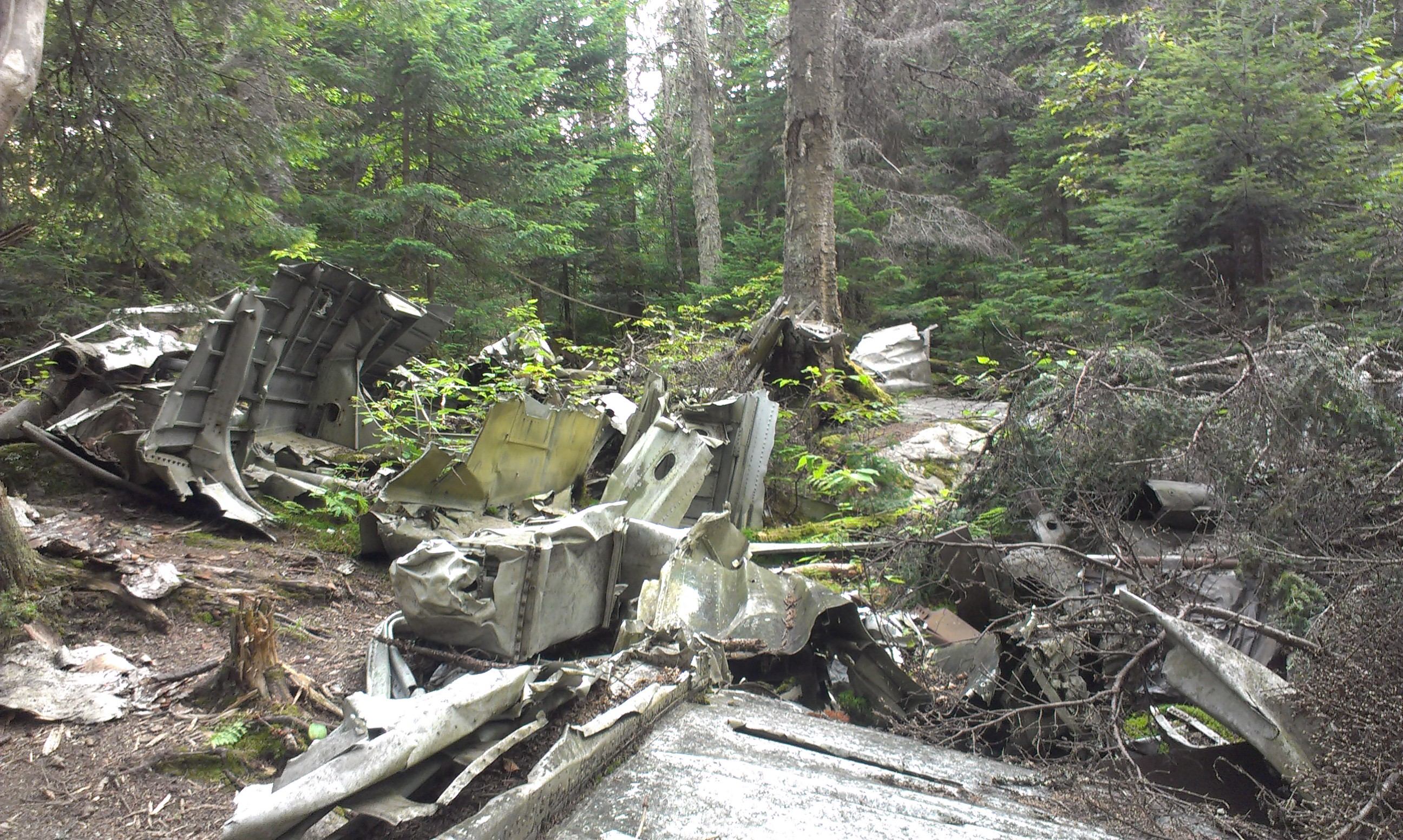

Accident
- Date: 20 October 1943
- Summary: CFIT (controlled flight into terrain)
- Site: Saint-Donat, Lanaudière, Quebec, Canada; 46°15′03″N 74°17′48.3″W

Aircraft
- Aircraft type: Consolidated Liberator III
- Aircraft name: Harry
- Operator: Royal Canadian Air Force No. 10 Squadron RCAF
- Registration: 3701H
- Flight origin: Gander International Airport
- Destination: Mont-Joli Airport, Québec
- Passengers: 20
- Crew: 4
- Fatalities: 24
- Injuries: 0
- Survivors: 0

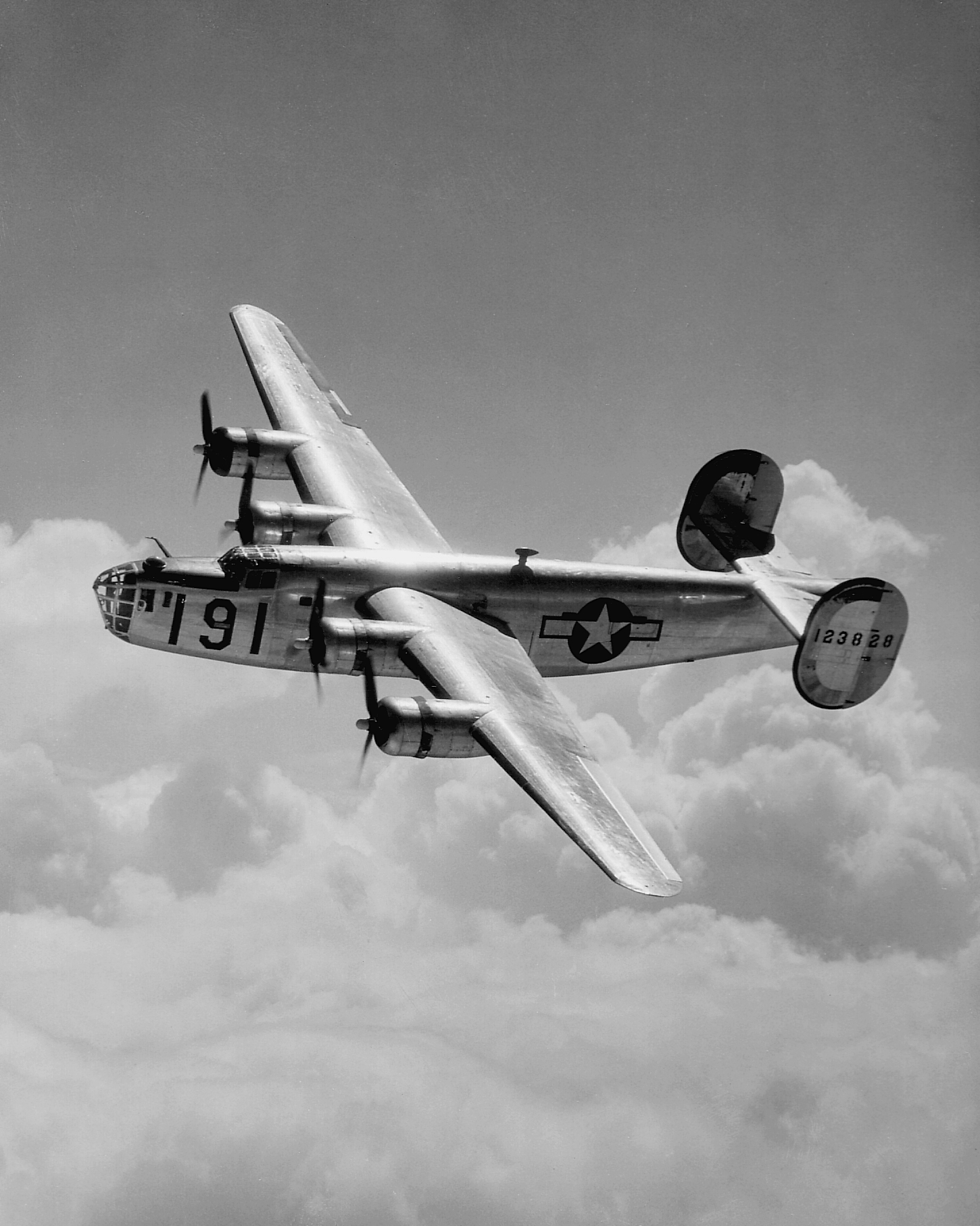
A USAAF B-24D, essentially identical to the accident aircraft

The 1943 Saint-Donat Liberator III Crash was an aerial accident that killed 24 people‍—‌the worst accident in Canadian military aviation history.

During a routine flight from Gander, Newfoundland to Mont-Joli, Quebec, a combination of inclement weather and a mapping error caused the Liberator to collide with the Black Mountain (French: Montagne Noire), killing all those on board. The wreckage was discovered accidentally more than two years later.

Today, a hiking trail leads to the site where remains of the aircraft can still be seen along with numerous plaques detailing the accident and a monument honouring those who died.

== Aircraft ==
The lost aircraft, Consolidated Liberator III (B-24D) serial number 41-24236, was purchased in September 1942 from the United States Army Air Forces (USAAF) as part of a four aircraft order. Once in RCAF service, the aircraft received the serial number 3701 and the individual aircraft letter H and was to be used by No. 10 Squadron RCAF for anti-submarine warfare (ASW). However, the four aircraft were in too poor a condition for the ASW mission, so they were primarily employed for training and general transport.

== Accident ==
On 19 October 1943, bad weather conditions had kept all aircraft at Gander International Airport grounded until 22:16 hours when the accident aircraft finally received authorization to leave on a routine flight to Mont-Joli Airport with a crew of 4 and 20 passengers, reportedly proceeding on leave. After about three hours in the air, at 01:45 the pilot made contact with Mont-Joli Airport control tower to ask for authorization to land, only to be notified that the landing strip was closed due to the weather and diverted the aircraft to Rockcliffe Airport, Ontario or Dorval airport, Montreal, Québec. Besides a call for help reportedly heard by another aircraft flying near Grand-Mère, Quebec, no other contact was made with the Liberator.

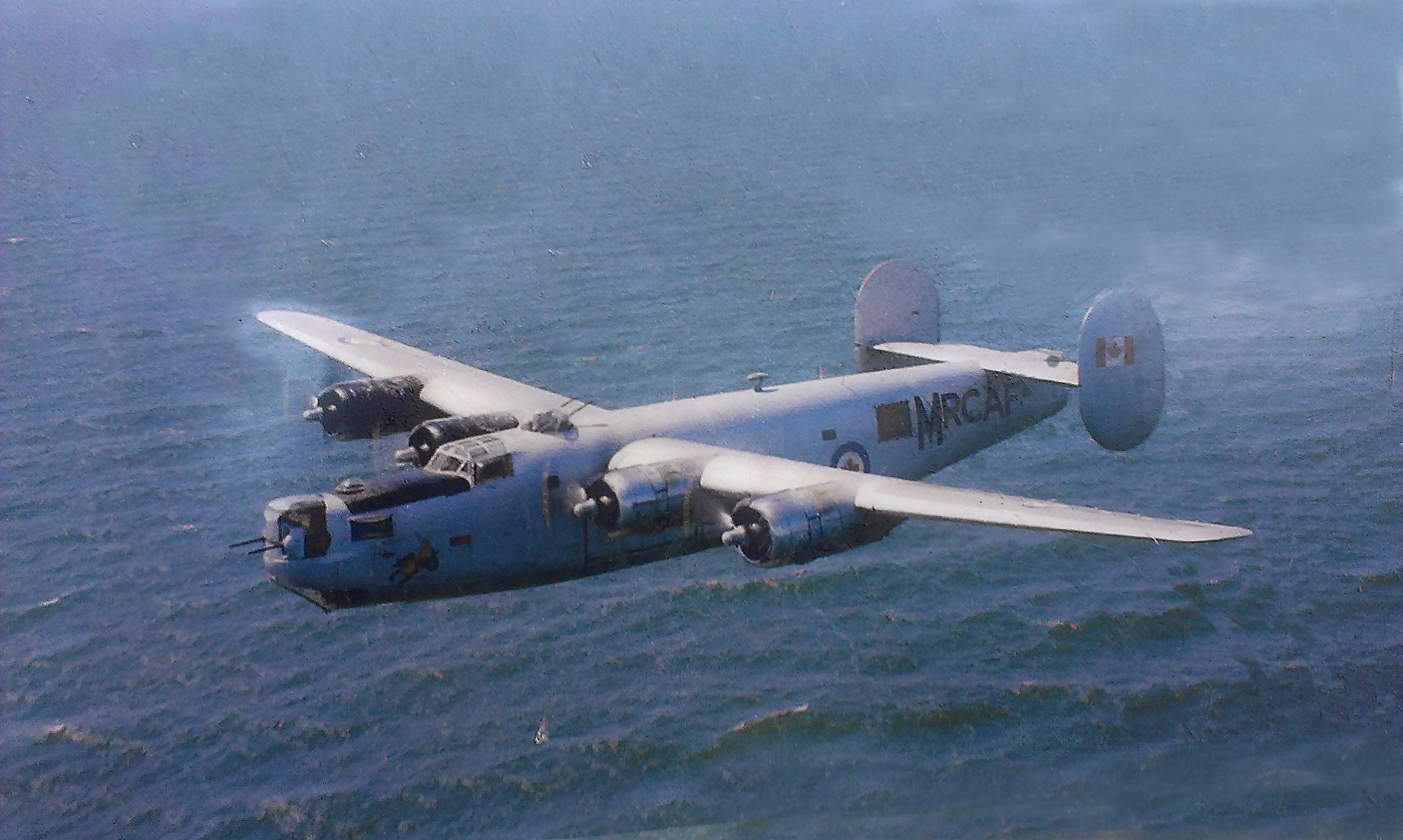
An RCAF Liberator GR.VIII (B-24J) similar to the accident aircraft, depicted on a plaque at the accident site

== Search for the wreckage ==
On the night of the crash, Saint-Donat villagers remember hearing the noise of a large aircraft passing overhead and moments later an impact. Jos Gaudet, then on duty in fire tower number four at Archambault lake, did see the light from the burning wreckage on top of the mountain, but thought it was the reflection of the sun on a moist rocky slope. On the morning of the crash, Gaudet and Georges Moore took a boat around lake Archambault to look for signs of wreckage, such as oil slicks or debris, believing that the aircraft had fallen in the water. Later on, Mr. Moore went to the town hall to alert the military authorities, but his claim was dismissed as being implausible.

As soon as the aircraft's disappearance was noted, Canada's eastern aerial command conducted searches along the planned route of the Liberator. After 728 sorties for a total of 2,438 flight hours between 20 October and 26 November, the search was called off by the RCAF. For almost three years, the disappearance of Liberator Harry remained a mystery, with the most plausible theory explaining failures to locate the aircraft was that it was lying at the bottom of the St. Lawrence River.

== Discovery of the wreckage ==
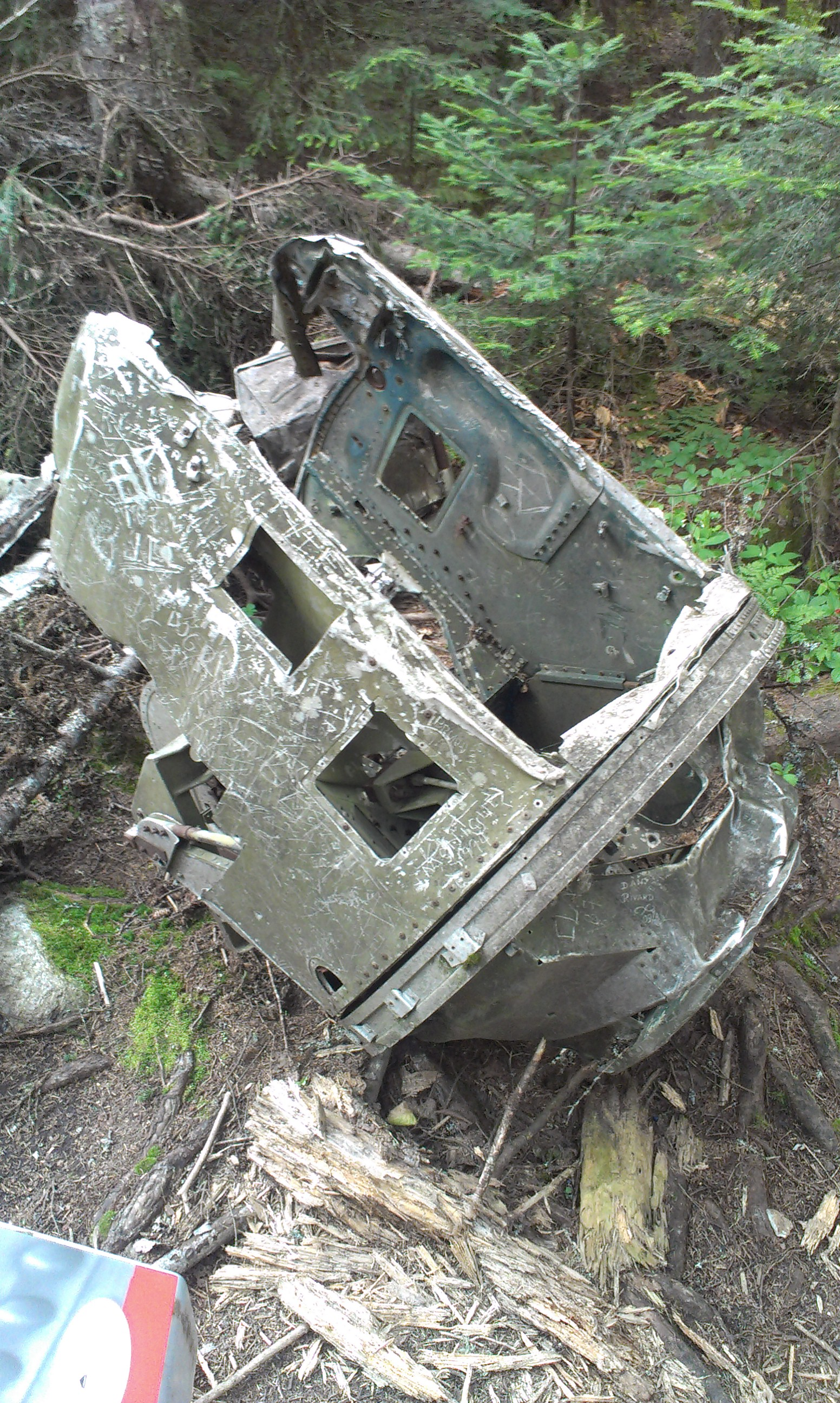
The rear turret

On 20 June 1946, while searching for another aircraft that had been reported as missing between Rockcliffe and Roberval, Quebec, the crew of a military search aircraft, piloted by Lt. B.D. Inrig, noticed a glint of sunshine coming from a metallic object and on closer investigation saw the characteristic twin fins of a Liberator near the top of the mountain. All records pointed to it being the lost aircraft.

That same day, a search party was formed and dispatched to the site under the command of Captain Harry Cobb RCAF. With no access to the site, the group had to trail-blaze its way through the forest guided by an observation plane which would nose dive to indicate the location of the wreckage. According to Cobb's testimony, all passengers had been killed on impact, which was confirmed by Dr. J.-A. Melançon, the coroner, who reported the deaths as being accidental. The aircraft had caught fire with only some assemblies, the rear fuselage and the engines having been spared by the blaze. Of the crew and passengers, only three bodies could be identified.

== Cause ==
At an altitude of 875 m (2,871 ft), the Black Mountain (La Montagne Noire) is the highest point of the region of Saint-Donat. While the exact cause of the accident is still unknown, it was later discovered that its height was not correctly reported on contemporary navigation maps. Given the poor weather conditions on the night of the crash, it is very likely that the pilot noticed the mountain too late to climb away from it.

== Commemoration ==
Not very long after the discovery of the wreckage, the debris was gathered into piles. The matter of bringing the remains of the lost soldiers out from the scene for burial in Ottawa was discussed at length between military authorities, and in the end it was decided that they should remain in place due to the impossibility of identifying all of them. In the afternoon of 3 July 1946, friends and family of the crew and passengers along with many members of the RCAF and religious authorities climbed the mountain to pay their respects to the dead and hold a funeral. Three religious services were held on that afternoon: Catholic, Protestant and Jewish. A plaque displaying the names of the victims was installed on the rock at the foot of which the remains were buried. For several years, the site would be maintained by local men paid on a small budget given by the Canadian Armed Forces.

During the summer of 1985, after having been notified of a desecration, the Canadian branch of the Commonwealth War Graves Commission decided to move the remains to the parish cemetery in Saint-Donat. There, a monument was erected to display the names of the victims along with a commemorative plaque.

On 30 June 1996, 50 years after the tragedy, a service attended by veterans of the 10 BR and locals was held at the crash site with flyovers by the Snowbirds. A funerary obelisk produced by the Commonwealth War Graves Commission and dedicated to the 24 soldiers was also unveiled in the cemetery in Saint-Donat where the remains were now buried.

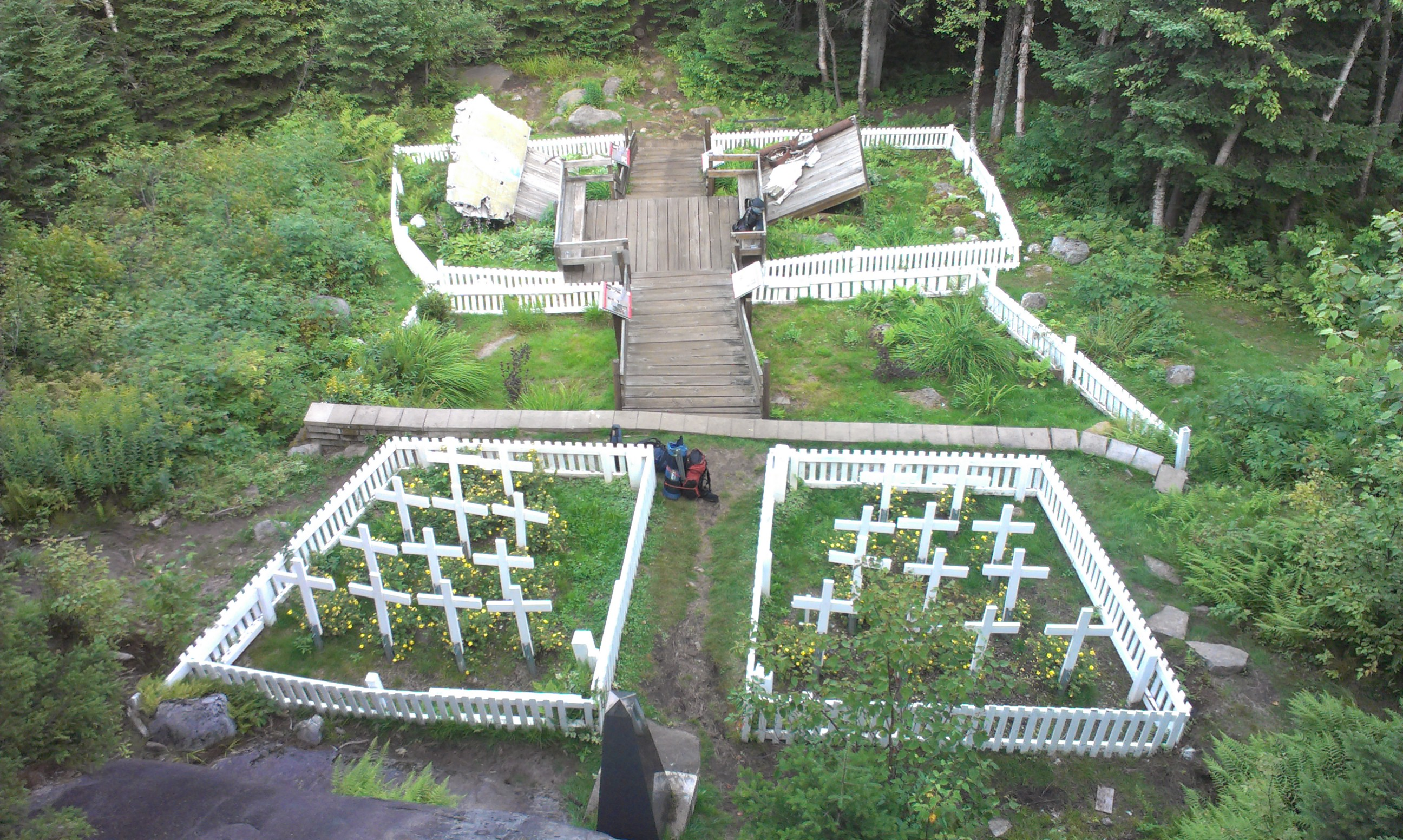
Crash site monument as seen from the observation tower

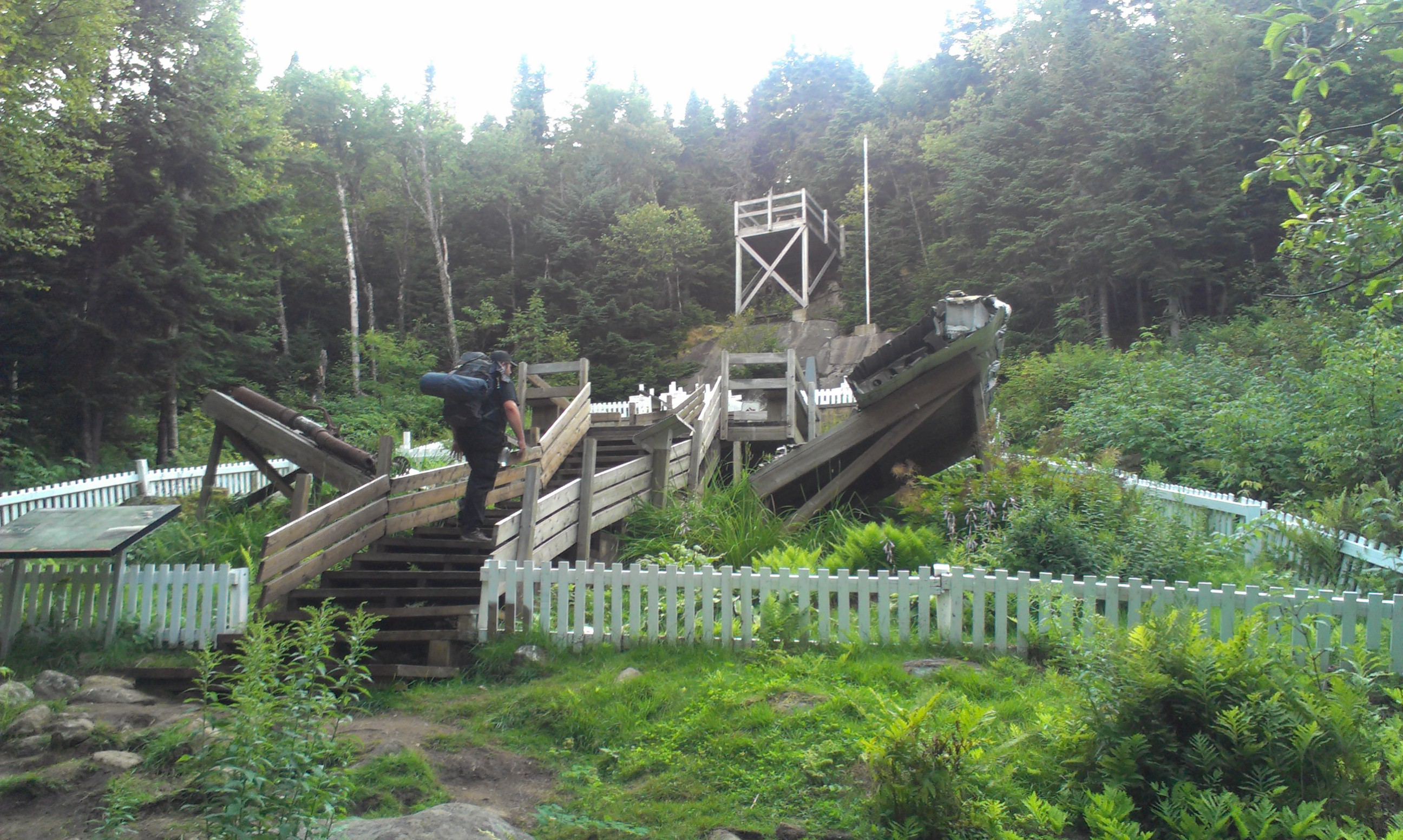
A different view of the site

Owing to the increasing number of visits the site was getting, partly due to its fame but also because the InterCentre trail was passing through, it was decided that it had to be reorganized in a more sustainable way. In the summer of 2000, work was undertaken to build stairs and a flag pole, and install informative plaques. Crosses for each of the victims were put in place and a small cenotaph was erected. The cenotaph lists on its sides the rank and name of each deceased person and has on its front a pictograph of the ill-fated plane and the following text:

En souvenir des vingt-quatre membres de l'Aviation Royale Canadienne qui ont perdu la vie dans l'écrasement du bombardier Liberator Harry sur la Montagne Noire le 20 octobre 1943

In memory of the twenty four members of the Royal Canadian Air Force who lost their lives in the crash of the Liberator Harry bomber on Montagne Noire on 20 October 1943

On 15 June 2013, to commemorate the 70th anniversary of the accident, a ceremony was held at the site with military music and flyovers of a CF-18 from the RCAF. In anticipation of this day and in order to make the site more accessible to less capable hikers, the path to the monument was improved, allowing it to be reached in less than 3 hours by foot from a parking lot at the bottom of the mountain.

On 29–30 September 2018, to commemorate the 75th anniversary of the tragedy, a ceremony was held on the crash site itself the first day and at the Saint-Donat cemetery the next day.

Cemetery

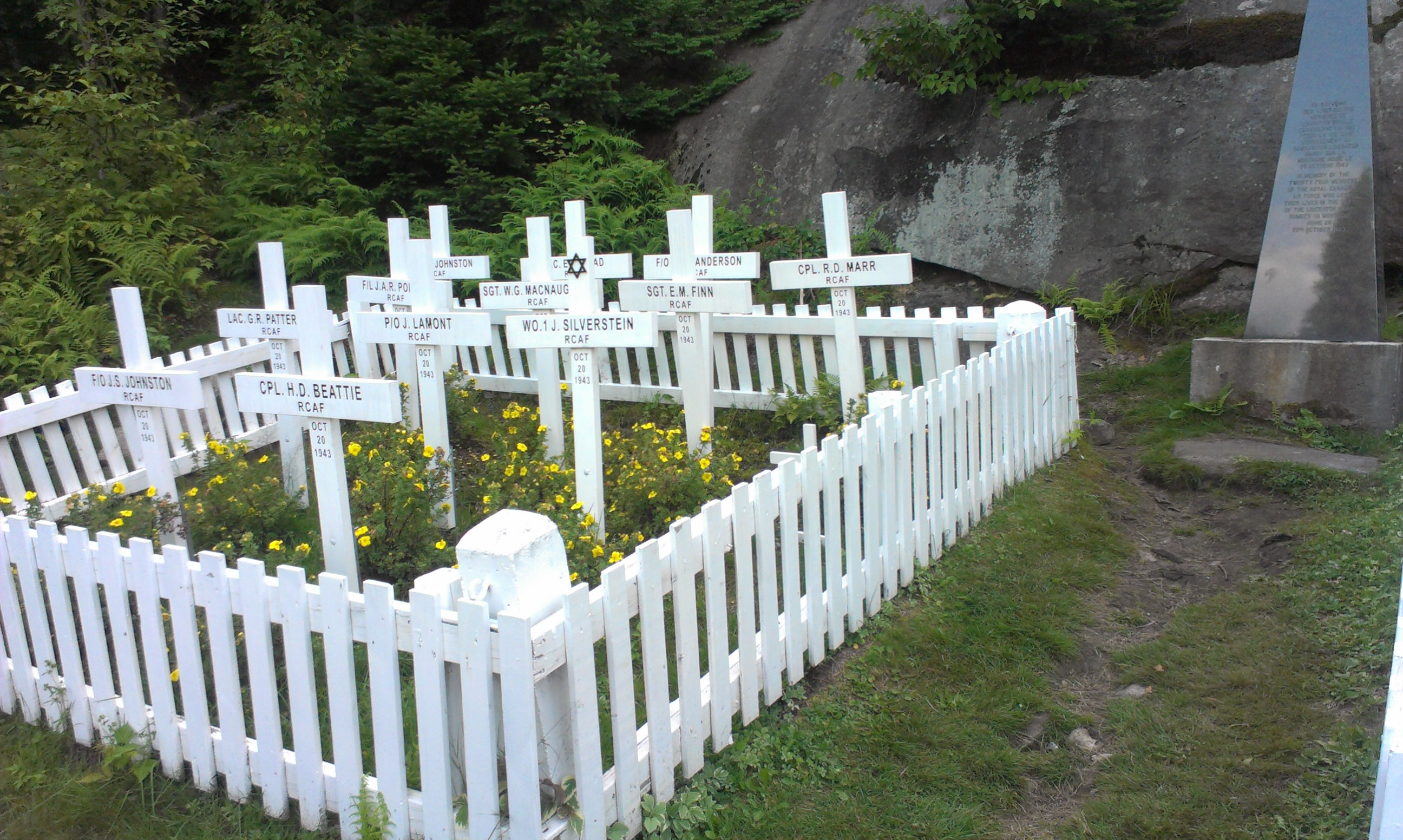

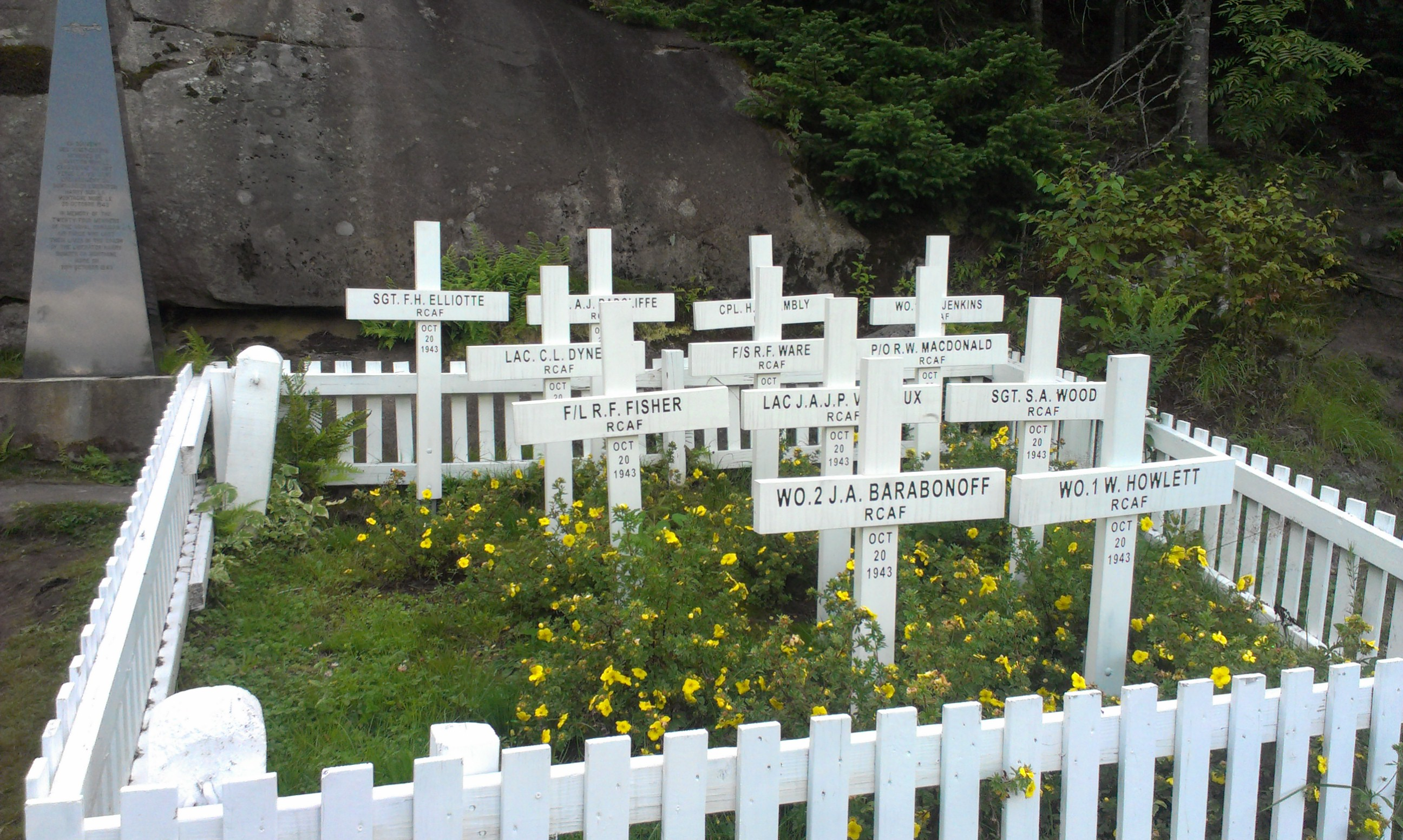
