= Lac des Alliés =

- Location in Quebec
- Location: Lac-Jacques-Cartier (TNO), La Côte-de-Beaupré Regional County Municipality, Capitale-Nationale
- Coordinates: 47.37611°N 71.35333°W
- Lake type: Lake of dam
- Primary inflows: (clockwise from the mouth) Rocheuse River, discharge of Walsh Lake and of Archambault Lake, discharge of lakes Pompée, César and Crassus.
- Primary outflows: Rocheuse River
- Basin countries: Canada
- Max. length: 3.0 km (1.9 mi)
- Max. width: 0.7 km (0.43 mi)
- Surface area: 1.39 km^{2} (0.54 sq mi)
- Surface elevation: 713 m (2,339 ft)

The Lac des Alliés (English: Allied Lake) is a freshwater body crossed west by the Rocheuse River, located in the unorganized territory of Lac-Jacques-Cartier, in the La Côte-de-Beaupré Regional County Municipality, in administrative region of Capitale-Nationale, in province of Quebec, in Canada.

Lac des Alliés is located entirely in Jacques-Cartier National Park. It constitutes an enlargement of the Rocheuse River.

The Lac des Alliés watershed is mainly served on the east side by the route 175 which links the towns of Quebec and Saguenay. A few secondary roads serve this area for forestry and recreational tourism activities.

Forestry is the main economic activity in the sector; recreational tourism, second.

The surface of Lac des Alliés is generally frozen from the beginning of December to the end of March; safe circulation on the ice is generally done from the end of December to the beginning of March.

== Geography ==
Lac des Alliés has a length of 3.0 kilometres (1.9 mi), a width of 0.7 kilometres (0.43 mi) and its surface is at an altitude of 713 metres (2,339 ft). This lake deep between the mountains is long, resembling a large misshapen N. The Sautauriski Lake is located 2.5 kilometres (1.6 mi) on the east side of the lake; and the course of the Jacques-Cartier River is 2.3 kilometres (1.4 mi) on the north side of the lake.

From the mouth of Lac des Alliés, the current descends consecutively on 3.8 kilometres (2.4 mi) to the west, then north following the course of the rivière Rocheuse; on 4.6 kilometres (2.9 mi) towards the southwest by following the course of the rivière du Malin; then on generally towards the south along the current of the Jacques-Cartier River to the northeast bank of the Saint-Laurent river.

The Lac des Alliés has an area of 138.7 hectares (343 acres). It is the third largest of the 216 bodies of water in the Jacques-Cartier National Park. A dam is built at its mouth allowing a water retention height of 3.1 kilometres (1.9 mi) for a reservoir capacity of 4,273,040 metres (14,019,160.105 ft).

== Toponymy ==
The name of this body of water would come from the surveyors evoking the memory of the allied troops of the First World War.

The toponym Lac des Alliés was formalized on December 5, 1968, by the Commission de toponymie du Québec.

== See also ==
- Jacques-Cartier National Park
- La Côte-de-Beaupré Regional County Municipality
- Lac-Jacques-Cartier, an unorganized territory
- Rocky River
- Rivière du Malin
- Jacques-Cartier River
- List of lakes of Canada

== Bibliography ==
- Corporation du bassin de la Jacques-Cartier (2013). Water Master Plan for the Jacques-Cartier Integrated Water Management Zone (PDF)..
