= Rocheuse River =

- Location within Quebec

Location
- Country: Canada
- Province: Quebec
- Region: Capitale-Nationale
- Regional County Municipality: La Côte-de-Beaupré Regional County Municipality
- Unorganized territory: Lac-Jacques-Cartier

Physical characteristics
- Source: Confluence of two forest streams
  - location: Lac-Jacques-Cartier
  - coordinates: 47.43698°N 71.29036°W
  - elevation: 780 m (2,560 ft)
- Mouth: Rivière du Malin
  - location: Lac-Jacques-Cartier
  - coordinates: 47.40583°N 71.36417°W
  - elevation: 557 m (1,827 ft)
- Length: 17.5 km (10.9 mi)
- Discharge
  - location: Lac-Jacques-Cartier

Basin features
- Tributaries
  - left: (Upward from the mouth) Décharge (via le Lac des Alliés) des lacs, César, Crassus et Pompée, décharge (via une baie du lac des Alliés) des lacs Walsh, Fragasso, Marguerite et Ti-Coq.

The Rocheuse river (English: Rocky River) is a tributary of the rivière du Malin, located in the unorganized territory of Lac-Jacques-Cartier, in the La Côte-de-Beaupré Regional County Municipality, in the administrative region of Capitale-Nationale, in Quebec, Canada. The course of the river passes in particular in the Laurentides Wildlife Reserve.

Forestry is the main economic activity in the sector; recreational tourism, second.

The surface of the Rocheuse River (except the rapids areas) is generally frozen from the beginning of December to the end of March, but the safe circulation on the ice is generally made from the end of December to the beginning of March.

== Geography ==
The main watersheds adjacent to the Rocky River are:

- north side: rivière du Malin, Jacques-Cartier River;
- east side: Fragasso Lake, Sautauriski Lake, Montmorency River;
- south side: Fragasso Lake, Sautauriski Lake, Walsh Lake, Rivière à la Chute (Jacques-Cartier River);
- west side: rivière du Malin, Jacques-Cartier River, Rivière Jacques-Cartier Nord-Ouest.

The Rocheuse river originates at the confluence of two mountain streams 780 metres (2,560 ft), located in the unorganized territory of Lac-Jacques-Cartier, in the regional county municipality (MRC) La Côte-de-Beaupré Regional County Municipality. From this confluence, the Rocheuse river flows on 17.5 kilometres (10.9 mi), with a total drop of 223 metres (732 ft), according to the following segments:

- 3.4 kilometres (2.1 mi) to the south, forming a large curve towards the east, to an unidentified stream (coming from the north);
- 3.4 kilometres (2.1 mi) towards the south by forming a first hook towards the west and a second at the end of the segment where the river branches off towards the west before crossing on 0.2 kilometres (0.12 mi) the Bradette Lake (altitude: 721 metres (2,365 ft)) to its mouth;
- 4.2 kilometres (2.6 mi) to the south, forming a few streamers, to a long bay on the eastern shore of Lac des Alliés;
- 2.7 kilometres (1.7 mi) westwards crossing Lac des Alliés (length: 3.0 kilometres (1.9 mi); altitude: 713 metres (2,339 ft)), bypassing a large peninsula attached to the south shore, to the Allies dam built at the mouth of the lake;
- 1.4 kilometres (0.87 mi) westward across a series of rapids at the end of the segment to a bend in the river;
- 2.4 kilometres (1.5 mi) to the north, crossing two long series of rapids, to its mouth.

From the confluence of the Rocky River, the current flows for 4.6 kilometres (2.9 mi) to the southwest, following the course of the rivière du Malin, a deep valley; then on south by the course of the Jacques-Cartier River to the northeast bank of the St. Lawrence River.

== Toponymy ==
The toponym "rivière Rocheuse" was formalized on December 5, 1968 at the Place Names Bank of the Commission de toponymie du Québec.

== See also ==
- Laurentides Wildlife Reserve
- Lac-Jacques-Cartier, a TNO
- La Côte-de-Beaupré Regional County Municipality, a MRC
- Rivière du Malin
- Jacques-Cartier River
- Lac des Alliés
- Fragasso Lake
- Walsh Lake
- List of rivers of Quebec

=== External links ===
- Réserve faunique des Laurentides
