= Walsh Lake =

Lake in Capitale-Nationale, Quebec, Canada

- Location in Quebec
- Location: Lac-Jacques-Cartier (TNO), La Côte-de-Beaupré Regional County Municipality, Capitale-Nationale
- Coordinates: 47.35778°N 71.32417°W
- Lake type: Lake of dam
- Primary inflows: (clockwise from the mouth) Discharge of Fragasso Lake, discharge of a little unidentified lake, discharge of lakes Marguerite, Cousin and Ti-Coq.
- Primary outflows: Discharge going to lac des Alliés which is crossed by Rocheuse River
- Basin countries: Canada
- Max. length: 1.1 km (0.68 mi)
- Max. width: 0.6 km (0.37 mi)
- Surface area: 34 ha (0.13 sq mi)
- Surface elevation: 742 m (2,434 ft)

Lake Walsh is a fresh water body crossed to the west on 0.44 kilometres (0.27 mi) by the discharge current from Fragasso Lake in Jacques-Cartier National Park. This lake is located entirely in the unorganized territory of Lac-Jacques-Cartier, in the La Côte-de-Beaupré Regional County Municipality, administrative region of Capitale-Nationale, in province of Quebec, in Canada.

The Walsh Lake watershed is mainly served on the east side by the route 175 which links the towns of Quebec and Saguenay. A few secondary roads serve this area for forestry and recreational tourism activities, notably forest road 12 which runs north of the lake and in the area between Fragasso Lake and lac Walsh.

Forestry is the main economic activity in the sector; recreational tourism, second.

The surface of lake Walsh is generally frozen from early December to late March; safe circulation on the ice is generally done from the end of December to the beginning of March.

== Geography ==
Walsh Lake has a length of 1.1 kilometres (0.68 mi), a width of 0.6 kilometres (0.37 mi) and its surface is at an altitude of 742 metres (2,434 ft). This lake between the mountains looks like a large inverted V. Lake Walsh crossed west on 0.44 kilometres (0.27 mi) by the current from the outlet of Fragasso Lake, to the dam at its mouth.

The Sautauriski Lake is located 2.0 kilometres (1.2 mi) on the northeast side of Walsh Lake; Fragasso Lake is located 0.3 kilometres (0.19 mi) on the northeast side of the lake; and the course of the Jacques-Cartier River goes to 7.8 kilometres (4.8 mi) on the west side of the lake.

Walsh Lake has an area of 34 hectares (84 acres). A water regulation dam was built in 2005 at the mouth of Walsh Lake allowing a water retention height of 2.4 metres (7 ft 10 in) for a reservoir capacity of 816,000 metres (2,677,165.354 ft).

From the mouth of Walsh Lake, the current first descends on 1.2 kilometres (0.75 mi) to the west, then branches off to the north, where the water discharges at the bottom of the west bay of lac des Alliés. From there, the current goes up on 1.3 kilometres (0.81 mi) towards the north, to join the current coming from the discharge of the Rocheuse River (coming from the north). Then, the current from the latter crosses 2.7 kilometres (1.7 mi) to the west of the Lac des Alliés to its mouth. From there, the current successively follows the course of the Rocheuse River on 3.8 kilometres (2.4 mi); on 4.6 kilometres (2.9 mi) towards the southwest by following the course of the rivière du Malin; then on generally towards the south along the current of the Jacques-Cartier River to the northeast bank of the Saint-Laurent river.

== Toponymy ==
The name "Walsh" is a family name of English origin.

The toponym "Lac Walsh" was formalized on June 1, 1971, by the Commission de toponymie du Québec.

== See also ==
- Jacques-Cartier National Park
- La Côte-de-Beaupré Regional County Municipality
- Lac-Jacques-Cartier, an unorganized territory
- Rocky River
- Rivière du Malin
- Jacques-Cartier River
- List of lakes of Canada

== Bibliography ==
- Corporation du bassin de la Jacques-Cartier (2013). "Plan directeur de l'eau de la zone de gestion intégrée de l'eau de la Jacques-Cartier" (PDF) (in French). p. 391.
