= Rivière du Malin =

- Location within Quebec

Location
- Country: Canada
- Province: Quebec
- Region: Capitale-Nationale
- Regional County Municipality: La Côte-de-Beaupré Regional County Municipality
- Unorganized territory: Lac-Jacques-Cartier

Physical characteristics
- Source: Lanoraye Lake
  - location: Lac-Jacques-Cartier
  - coordinates: 47.43698°N 71.29036°W
  - elevation: 781 m (2,562 ft)
- Mouth: Rivière du Malin
  - location: Lac-Jacques-Cartier
  - coordinates: 47.40083°N 71.41444°W
  - elevation: 350 m (1,150 ft)
- Length: 11.0 km (6.8 mi)
- Discharge
  - location: Lac-Jacques-Cartier

Basin features
- Tributaries
  - left: (Upward from the mouth) Décharge du Lac Brière, Rocheuse River, décharge des lacs Aubé et Macé.
  - right: (Upward from the mouth) Décharge du lac Breton, décharge d'un lac non identifié.

The rivière du Malin (English: Malin river) is a tributary of the Jacques-Cartier River, located in the unorganized territory of Lac-Jacques-Cartier, in the La Côte-de-Beaupré Regional County Municipality, in the administrative region of Capitale-Nationale, in Quebec, Canada. The course of the river passes in particular in the Laurentides Wildlife Reserve.

Forestry is the main economic activity in the sector; recreational tourism, second.

The surface of the Malin River (except the rapids areas) is generally frozen from the beginning of December to the end of March, but the safe circulation on the ice is generally made from the end of December to the beginning of March.

== Geography ==
The main watersheds neighboring the Malin River are:

- north side: Jacques-Cartier River, rivière du Milieu;
- east side: Jacques-Cartier River, Chartier lake, Archambault Lake, Rocheuse River, Montmorency River;
- south side: Rocheuse River, Lac des Alliés, Fragasso Lake, Walsh Lake, rivière à la Chute;
- west side: Jacques-Cartier River, rivière Jacques-Cartier Nord-Ouest.

The Rocheuse river draws its source from Lanoraye Lake (length: 1.1 kilometres (0.68 mi); altitude: 781 metres (2,562 ft)), located in the unorganized territory of Lac-Jacques-Cartier, in the La Côte-de-Beaupré Regional County Municipality. This lake resembling a rectangle with rounded corners, includes an island and a peninsula attached to the northeast shore.

From Lac Lanoraye, the Malin river flows over 11.0 kilometres (6.8 mi), with a total drop of 431 metres (1,414 ft), according to the following segments:

- 2.8 kilometres (1.7 mi) to the south, forming a large curve towards the east and descending in an increasingly steep valley, to an unidentified stream (coming from the northwest);
- 3.6 kilometres (2.2 mi) south almost in a straight line in a very deep valley before and branching south-west until the confluence of the Rocheuse River (coming from the south);
- 4.6 kilometres (2.9 mi) south-west in a very deep valley, branching south to its mouth.

From the confluence of the Rocheuse river, the current flows south by the course of the Jacques-Cartier River to the northeast bank of the Saint Lawrence River.

== Toponymy ==
The toponym "Rivière du Malin" was formalized on November 7, 1985 at the Place Names Bank of the Commission de toponymie du Québec.

== See also ==
- Laurentides Wildlife Reserve
- Lac-Jacques-Cartier, a TNO
- La Côte-de-Beaupré Regional County Municipality
- Rocheuse River
- Jacques-Cartier River
- Lanoraye Lake
- List of rivers of Quebec

=== External links ===
- Réserve faunique des Laurentides
