= Rivière à la Chute =

- Location within Quebec

Location
- Country: Canada
- Province: Quebec
- Region: Capitale-Nationale
- Regional County Municipality: La Jacques-Cartier and La Côte-de-Beaupré
- Unorganized territory and a municipality: Lac-Jacques-Cartier and Stoneham-et-Tewkesbury

Physical characteristics
- Source: Lac des Quatre Jumeaux
  - coordinates: 47°20′13″N 71°24′41″W
- Mouth: Saint Lawrence River
  - location: Donnacona
  - coordinates: 46°13′00″N 71°21′48″W
- Length: 22.1 km (13.7 mi)

Basin features
- Tributaries
  - left: (Upward from the mouth) Discharge of Lac à la Chute, discharge of an unidentified swamp lake, discharge of lakes Cartier, Rochefort and Thierry.
  - right: (Upward from the mouth) Discharge of lac Perché, discharge of lakes Pouliot, Tony and Bourassa.

The Rivière à la Chute is a tributary of the Sautauriski River, flowing in the administrative region of Capitale-Nationale, in Quebec, Canada. This watercourse crosses the unorganized territory of Lac-Jacques-Cartier in the MRC La Côte-de-Beaupré Regional County Municipality and the municipality of Stoneham-et-Tewkesbury, in the MRC of La Jacques-Cartier Regional County Municipality.

The course of the river flows entirely in the Jacques-Cartier National Park which is affiliated with the Société des établissements de plein air du Québec (Sépaq).

The valley of the falling river is mainly served on the east side by the route 175 which connects the towns of Quebec and Saguenay. Some secondary roads serve this area for forestry and recreational tourism activities.

Forestry is the main economic activity in the sector; recreational tourism, second.

The surface of the Rivière à la Chute (except the rapids) is generally frozen from the beginning of December to the end of March; safe circulation on the ice is generally done from the end of December to the beginning of March.

== Geography ==
The Rivière à la Chute takes its source from the lake of Quatre Jumeaux (length: 1.8 kilometres (1.1 mi); width: 0.9 kilometres (0.56 mi); altitude: 759 metres (2,490 ft)), located in the unorganized territory of Lac-Jacques-Cartier, in the MRC of La Côte-de-Beaupré Regional County Municipality. This lake has an atypical shape, being encased between the mountains. It includes a peninsula attached to the north shore stretching over 0.6 kilometres (0.37 mi) to the south, and a second peninsula attached to the west shore stretching over 0.3 kilometres (0.19 mi) north-east. A fire tower was located 1.3 kilometres (0.81 mi) to the southeast at the top of a mountain, at 958 metres (3,143 ft) above sea level.

The course of the Fall River looks like a question mark. With the exception of the upper part, the course of the river flows more or less in parallel (east side) to the Jacques-Cartier River. The course of the river flows over 22.1 kilometres (13.7 mi) with a drop of 485 metres (1,591 ft).

The course of the Chute river flows over 22.1 kilometres (13.7 mi) with a drop of 485 metres (1,591 ft) according to the following segments:

- 1.5 metres (4 ft 11 in) towards the north-west in particular by crossing Lake Perche (length: 0.23 kilometres (0.14 mi); altitude: 733 metres (2,405 ft)) until at its mouth;
- 0.8 metres (2 ft 7 in) to the east by crossing an area of marshland, then branching north especially by crossing Lake Vaucaire (length: 0.5 kilometres (0.31 mi); altitude: 715 metres (2,346 ft)) to its mouth;
- 1.4 metres (4 ft 7 in) towards the northeast by bending to the east to go around a mountain, up to a stream (coming from the north);
- 7.9 metres (26 ft) towards the south-east in a deep valley, up to the northern limit of the canton of Cauchon;
- 3.2 metres (10 ft) south in the canton of Cauchon in a deep valley to the outlet (coming from the north) of lac de la Chute;
- 2.5 metres (8 ft 2 in) to the south in a deep valley, up to the southern limit of the canton of Cauchon;
- 4.8 metres (16 ft) towards the south in a deep valley, by collecting a brook (coming from the northwest), until its mouth.

The outlet of Rivière à la Chute is located on the northwest bank of the Sautauriski River. From this confluence, the current descends the Sautauriski river for 4.6 kilometres (2.9 mi) to the south, then follows the course of the Jacques-Cartier River generally south to the north-East shore of the St. Lawrence River.

== Toponymy ==
This toponym appears on various documents, cartographic or other, at least since 1925.

The toponym "Rivière à la Chute" was formalized on December 5, 1968 at the Place Names Bank of the Commission de toponymie du Québec.

== See also ==
- Jacques-Cartier National Park
- Lac-Jacques-Cartier, an unorganized territory
- Stoneham-et-Tewkesbury, a municipality
- La Côte-de-Beaupré Regional County Municipality
- La Jacques-Cartier Regional County Municipality
- Sautauriski River
- Jacques-Cartier River
- List of rivers of Quebec

=== External links ===
- Parc national de la Jacques-Cartier - Jacques-Cartier National Parc
