= Saint-Donat, Lanaudière =

Saint-Donat
- Municipality
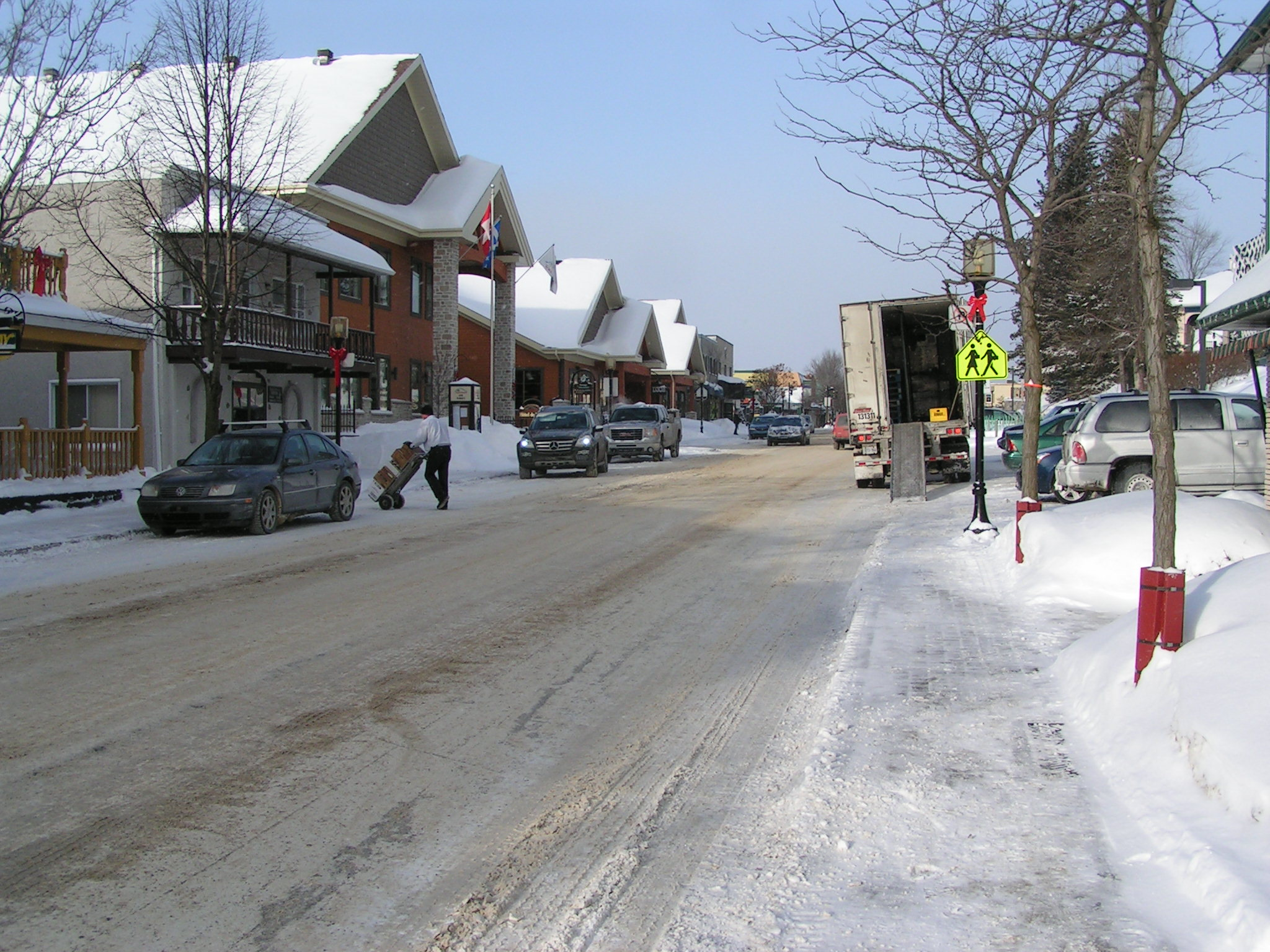
- Principal Street

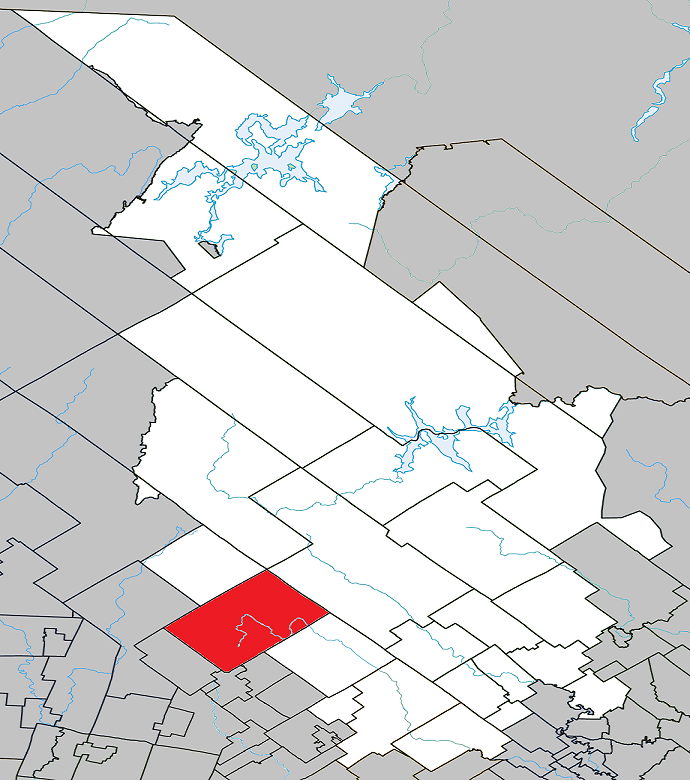
- Location within Matawinie RCM

- Location in central Quebec
- Coordinates: 46°19′N 74°13′W
- Country: Canada
- Province: Quebec
- Region: Lanaudière
- RCM: Matawinie
- Settled: c. 1876
- Constituted: February 19, 1904

Government
  - Mayor: Joé Deslauriers
  - Fed. riding: Joliette—Manawan
  - Prov. riding: Bertrand

Area
  - Municipality: 389.08 km^{2} (150.22 sq mi)
  - Land: 350.17 km^{2} (135.20 sq mi)
  - Urban: 3.26 km^{2} (1.26 sq mi)

Population (2021)
  - Municipality: 4,561
  - Density: 13/km^{2} (34/sq mi)
  - Urban: 1,512
  - Urban density: 464.3/km^{2} (1,203/sq mi)
  - Change 2016-21: ▲17.3%
  - Dwellings: 4,527
- Time zone: UTC−5 (EST)
  - Summer (DST): UTC−4 (EDT)
- Postal code(s): J0T 2C0
- Area code(s): 819
- Highways: R-125 R-329
- Website: www.saint-donat.ca

Saint-Donat (French pronunciation: [sɛ̃ dɔna]) is a township municipality in the Canadian province of Quebec, part of the Regional County Municipality of Matawinie, within the larger administrative region of Lanaudière. The municipality is also known as Saint-Donat-de-Montcalm to distinguish it from a parish municipality with the same name in La Mitis RCM. It is located approximately 135 kilometres (84 mi) northwest of Montreal. The town is surrounded by mountains and numerous water basins of the Laurentian Mountains. The municipality borders Mont-Tremblant National Park.

== History ==
Saint-Donat was founded sometime near 1876 by a religious community of suffragettes as the "Saint-Donat Parish" near the church (located at the intersection of Principale and Allard streets). It was therefore first settled in the mid-to-late 19th century, as a solution to the overcrowding of cities such as Montreal. Over time, the small village received urban population attracted by its beautiful landscape and the town was officially established in 1904.

In 1943, a RCAF Liberator III crashed on Black Mountain (French: Montagne Noire) in Saint-Donat, killing 24 people‍—‌the worst accident in Canadian military aviation history.

By 1950, Saint-Donat had reached a population of 2,000. As of 2021, the town was nearing 4,600 permanent residents.

== Geography ==
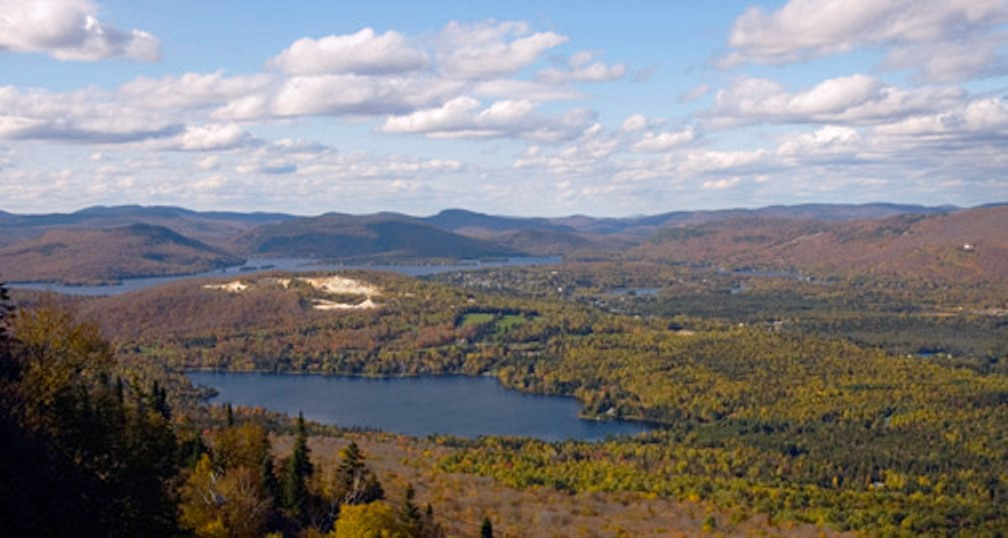
Landscape of Saint-Donat

Saint-Donat is located in the Laurentian Mountains, approximately 140 kilometres (87 mi), or a 90-minute drive, north-west of Montreal.

=== Topography ===
The average altitude of the municipality is 519 metres (1,703 ft), and its highest point is the summit of Montagne Noire at 892 metres (2,927 ft).

Several hiking trails criss-cross the mountains in the municipality. They are cleared and maintained by various volunteer groups and walking clubs in collaboration with the municipality.

=== Hydrography ===
The territory of Saint-Donat is very large and has many lakes, including the imposing Archambault and Ouareau lakes, as well as many other smaller lakes such as Lac Baribeau, Lac Pembina, Lac Croche, and others. Among its many rivers are the Saint-Michel River and Ouareau River, the main tributary of the L'Assomption River.

In addition to lakes and rivers, Saint-Donat has numerous coves, bays, passes, ponds, and even rapids on the Ouareau River.

== Demographics ==
=== Population ===
Historical Census Data - Saint-Donat, Lanaudière, Quebec

Year	Pop.	±%
1911	637	—
1921	796	+25.0%
1931	1,094	+37.4%
1941	1,392	+27.2%
1951	1,876	+34.8%
1956	1,920	+2.3%
1961	2,214	+15.3%

Year	Pop.	±%
1966	2,438	+10.1%
1971	2,624	+7.6%
1976	2,569	−2.1%
1981	2,754	+7.2%
1986	2,627	−4.6%
1991	2,946	+12.1%
1996	3,262	+10.7%

Year	Pop.	±%
2001	3,444	+5.6%
2006	4,297	+24.8%
2011	4,130	−3.9%
2016	3,888	−5.9%
2021	4,561	+17.3%

Source: Statistics Canada

Private dwellings occupied by usual residents (2021): 2434 (total dwellings: 4527)

=== Language ===
All official government actions take place in French, the official language of Quebec. French is the primary language spoken in Saint-Donat, though some people, especially those who deal often with tourists, are able to speak and understand English.

Mother tongue (2021):

- English as first language: 2.8%
- French as first language: 94.4%
- English and French as first languages: 1.1%
- Other as first language: 1.9%

== Economy ==
A silica mine is located in Saint-Donat.

== Attractions ==
Saint-Donat is often frequented by tourists in the winter. Its main attraction is snowmobiling, but other winter sports, such as skiing, can be enjoyed there as well, with Ski Garceau and Ski La Reserve being the two most popular resorts in the area. Outdoor skating rinks and cross country ski trails through the forest are frequented by locals and tourists alike. Its mountains, lakes, and pleasant weather attract many tourists in the summer season. Many people who vacation in Saint-Donat during the summer enjoy swimming, kayaking, sailing, and water-skiing on its two large lakes, Lac Archambault and Lac Ouareau. Saint-Donat is the only village in the Laurentiens that has two side-by-side lakes of the size of Archambault and Ouareau.

The year-round population of Saint-Donat is approximately 3,700, but during the tourist season, the number of people actually in Saint-Donat can reach 20,000. Saint-Donat has been recognized for its beauty and has received national recognition, especially for the quality of its public places. It was first recognized as a prime tourist destination in 1908, by an engineer with the Ministry of Lands and Forests. Hotels and other businesses necessary in a tourist destination began within a few decades, and tourism was the focal point of the local economy by 1970.

Saint-Donat can be accessed by two main highways, the 125 and 329, and is located 1h30min from Montreal by car. There is also a local airport accessible to light aircraft in the village of Saint-Donat.

== Government ==
The current mayor of Saint-Donat is Joé Deslauriers. The mayor and a six-member city council are the elected officials of the municipality.

Saint-Donat forms part of the federal electoral district of Joliette—Manawan and has been represented by Gabriel Ste-Marie of the Bloc Québécois since 2015.

Saint-Donat federal election results
Year	Liberal		Conservative		Bloc Québécois		New Democratic		Green	
2021	29%	756	10%	261	53%	1,382	4%	95	1%	39
2019	26%	635	9%	224	55%	1,368	4%	91	4%	106
2015	31%	468	8%	118	34%	508	25%	381	2%	25
2011	6%	95	11%	165	33%	491	47%	689	3%	39
2008	16%	252	18%	283	52%	824	10%	164	3%	47
2006	9%	133	29%	417	53%	758	5%	66	4%	51
2004	25%	376	7%	108	62%	923	3%	52	2%	24

Provincially, Saint-Donat is part of the Bertrand electoral district and is represented by France-Élaine Duranceau of the Coalition Avenir Québec since 2022.

Saint-Donat provincial election results
Year	CAQ		Liberal		QC solidaire		Parti Québécois	
2022	52%	674	5%	63	10%	136	22%	293
2018	49%	1,247	14%	353	12%	312	21%	538
2014	26%	606	24%	561	5%	107	44%	1,033
2012	27%	469	16%	274	3%	55	52%	898

== Education ==
Sainte Agathe Academy (of the Sir Wilfrid Laurier School Board) in Sainte-Agathe-des-Monts serves English-speaking students in this community for both elementary and secondary levels.

== Sister cities ==
Saint-Donat is twinned with:

- Lans-en-Vercors, France, since 1990

== See also ==
- List of municipalities in Quebec
