= Michel Fragasso =

Civil engineer

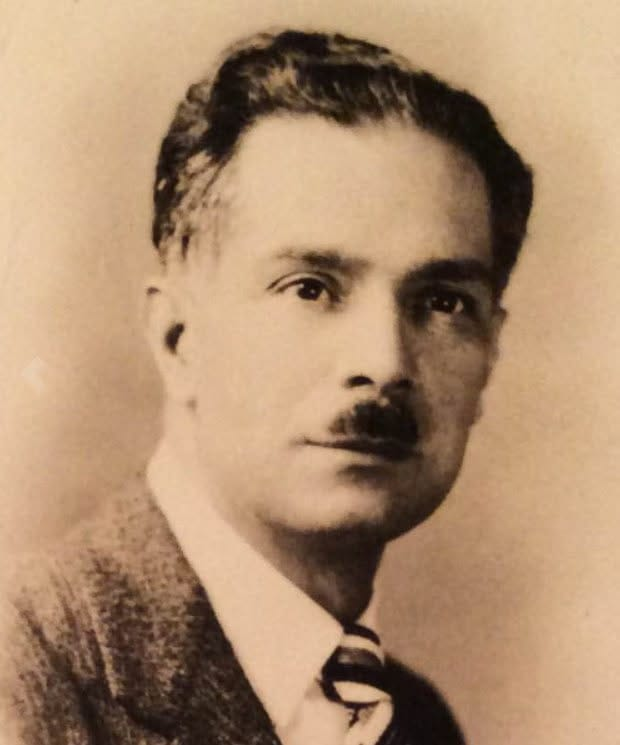
- Born: 1888
- Died: 1954 (aged 65–66)
- Occupation: Civil engineer

Michel Fragasso (1888–1954), originally from Cerignola, in the province of Foggia in Italy was a Quebec engineer who participated in the design and production of several public infrastructures in Quebec, Canada. He had married Clara Taché, daughter of the architect Eugène-Étienne Taché who is the author of the plans of the Parliament of Quebec, the Armory of Quebec as well as the motto of Quebec: "I remember".

== Biography ==
At the end of his engineering studies in Liège, Michel Fragasso immigrated to Quebec in 1912 to pursue a career as an engineer. In addition to having participated in the construction of the Quebec Bridge around 1913, this engineer erected several dams, in particular those of the Jacques-Cartier lakes, in the Laurentides Wildlife Reserve, and of the Sautauriski Lake, located in Jacques-Cartier National Park.

The toponym "Lac Fragasso" was formalized on October 19, 1990, by the Commission de toponymie du Québec referring to the work of life of Michel Fragasso.

== See also ==
- Fragasso Lake
