= Saint-Michel River =

River in Lanaudière, Quebec, Canada

Location
- Country: Canada
- Province: Quebec
- Region: Lanaudière
- Regional County Municipality: Matawinie Regional County Municipality

Physical characteristics
- Source: Little unidentified lake
  - location: Saint-Donat, Quebec
  - coordinates: 46.28109°N 74.34482°W
  - elevation: 496 m (1,627 ft)
- Mouth: Lake Ouareau
  - location: Saint-Donat, Quebec
  - coordinates: 46.29805°N 74.26195°W
  - elevation: 390 m (1,280 ft)
- Length: 12.9 km (8.0 mi)

Basin features
- Tributaries
  - left: (Upward from the mouth) Discharge from a lake, two streams, St. Martin stream, stream, discharge from a lake.
  - right: (Upward from the mouth) Three discharges from a lake, stream, discharge from Lac d'Enfant.

The Saint-Michel River is a watercourse of the municipality of Saint-Donat, in the Matawinie Regional County Municipality, in the administrative region of Lanaudière, in the province of Quebec, in Canada.

The middle and upper part of the Saint-Michel river valley is served by the Chemin du Nordet; the lower part via Régimbald road and Rexfor road. Forestry is the main economic activity; recreational tourism, second.

The surface of the Saint-Michel river (except the rapids areas) is generally frozen from mid-December to the end of March; safe circulation on the ice is generally done from the end of December to the beginning of March. The water level of the river varies with the seasons and the precipitation.

== Geography ==
The main watersheds adjacent to that of the Saint-Michel river are:

- north side: Saint-Martin stream, Saint-Louis lake.
- east side: Archambault lake, Ouareau River;
- south side: Bride River, Lac de l'Original;
- west side: Le Boulé River.

The Saint-Michel river rises at the mouth of an unidentified small lake (length: 0.17 kilometres (0.11 mi); altitude: 495 metres (1,624 ft)), located in the municipality of Saint-Donat. From its source, the Saint-Michel river generally flows northwest in the forest zone over 12.9 kilometres (8.0 mi) according to the following segments:

- 2.6 kilometres (1.6 mi) north-east to Saint-Martin stream (coming from the north);
- 2.9 kilometres (1.8 mi) towards the northeast by forming a loop towards the north, then towards the east, up to the Nordet road;
- 2.3 kilometres (1.4 mi) towards the south-east, collecting a stream (coming from the north) and collecting the discharge (coming from the south) from a small lake, to the discharge (coming from the south -est) of a lake;
- 1.7 kilometres (1.1 mi) south-east, then north, to the outlet (coming from the north-west) of a lake;
- 3.4 kilometres (2.1 mi) towards the northeast, passing by the southeast side of the zoo, then north of a hamlet by forming a loop towards the north, until the confluence of the Saint river -Michel.

The Saint-Michel river flows at the bottom of a small bay (surrounded by marshes) on the west shore of Lake Archambault in Saint-Donat. This bay is 1.3 kilometres (0.81 mi) long until the limit of the last island. The confluence of the Saint-Michel river is located at:

- 3.6 kilometres (2.2 mi) south-west of the village center of Saint-Donat;
- 5.0 kilometres (3.1 mi) south-west of the mouth of Lake Archambault;
- 10.4 kilometres (6.5 mi) south-west of the mouth of Lake Ouareau.

From its confluence, the current of the Saint-Michel river crosses Lake Archambault towards the north on 5.8 kilometres (3.6 mi) passing by the west side of the village of Saint-Donat; then descend successively on 6.3 kilometres (3.9 mi) south-east to Lake Ouareau; on 6.9 kilometres (4.3 mi) first towards the south-east crossing Lake Ouareau to Grande Pointe, then north to the mouth of the lake; on 83.8 kilometres (52.1 mi) following the course of the Ouareau River; on following the course of the L'Assomption River which flows onto the northwest bank of the Saint Lawrence River.

== Toponymy ==
The toponyms Mont Saint-Michel and Rivière Saint-Michel are linked.

The toponym Rivière Saint-Michel was formalized on December 5, 1968.

== Appendices ==
=== Related articles ===
- Matawinie Regional County Municipality
- Saint-Donat, a municipality
- Lake Archambault, a body of water
- Ouareau River, a stream
- L'Assomption River, a stream
- List of rivers of Quebec

=== External links ===
- Saint-Donat official site
