= Lanoraye Lake =

Lake in Canada

- Location in Quebec
- Location: Lac-Jacques-Cartier (TNO), La Côte-de-Beaupré Regional County Municipality, Capitale-Nationale
- Coordinates: 47.45333°N 71.33444°W
- Lake type: Natural
- Basin countries: Canada
- Max. length: 1.1 km (0.68 mi)
- Max. width: 0.9 km (0.56 mi)
- Surface elevation: 781 m (2,562 ft)

The Lac Lanoraye is a fresh water body whose discharge spills into the rivière du Malin, in the unorganized territory of Lac-Jacques-Cartier, in the La Côte-de-Beaupré Regional County Municipality, in the administrative region of Capitale-Nationale, in province of Quebec, in Canada.

Lac Lanoraye is located in the south center in the Laurentides Wildlife Reserve, that is 0.6 kilometres (0.37 mi) south of a curve of the course of the upper part of the Jacques-Cartier River.

The area of this lake is served by a few secondary roads for the needs of forestry and recreational tourism activities.

Forestry is the main economic activity in the sector; recreational tourism, second.

The surface of Lac Lanoraye is generally frozen from the beginning of December to the end of March, but the safe circulation on the ice is generally made from mid-December to mid-March.

== Geography ==
Lake Lanoraye has a length of 1.1 kilometres (0.68 mi), a width of 0.8 kilometres (0.50 mi) and its surface is at an altitude of 781 metres (2,562 ft). This lake encased between the mountains looks like a rectangle with rounded corners. This lake has a peninsula attached to the eastern shore stretching west towards the island.

The course of the Jacques-Cartier River goes to 0.5 kilometres (0.31 mi) on the north side of lac Lanoraye.

From the mouth of Lake Lanoraye, the current descends on 11.0 kilometres (6.8 mi) following the course of the rivière du Malin. Then the current follows the course of the Jacques-Cartier River on generally south to the northeast bank of the St. Lawrence River.

== Toponymy ==
The toponym "Lac Lanoraye" was formalized on December 5, 1968, by the Commission de toponymie du Québec.

== See also ==
- Laurentides Wildlife Reserve
- La Côte-de-Beaupré Regional County Municipality (MRC)
- Lac-Jacques-Cartier, a TNO
- Rivière du Malin
- Jacques-Cartier River
- List of lakes of Canada
