= Sautauriski Mountain =

Mountain in Quebec, Canada

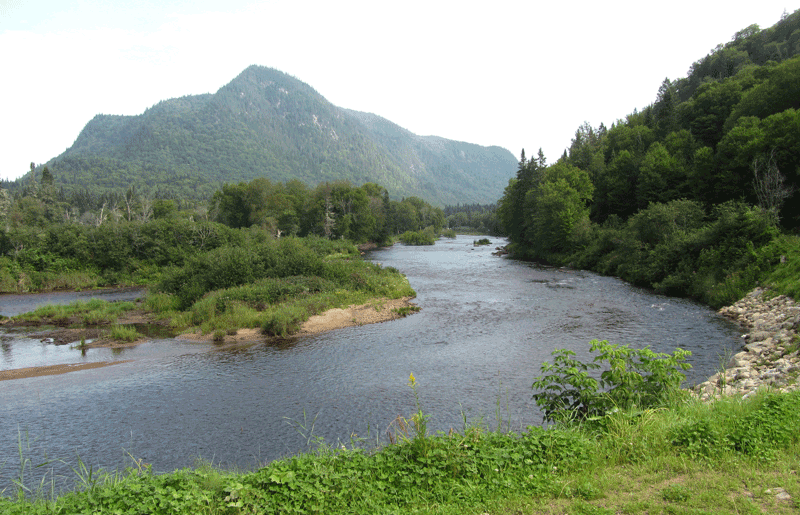

Highest point
- Peak: 727 m (2,385 ft)

Geography
- Location within Quebec
- Country: Canada
- Region: Quebec
- Range coordinates: 47°12′29″N 71°22′55″W
- Parent range: Laurentian Mountains

The Sautauriski mountain (old name: "Mont des Loups") culminates at 727 metres (2,385 ft) in the southern part of Jacques-Cartier National Park, in the municipality of Stoneham-et-Tewkesbury, in the regional county municipality (MRC) of La Jacques-Cartier, in the administrative region of Capitale-Nationale, in Quebec, Canada.

== Geography ==
The top of the Sautauriski mountain is located at:

- 1.0 kilometre (0.62 mi) north-east of the Jacques-Cartier river;
- 2.4 kilometres (1.5 mi) north of the confluence of the Sautauriski and Jacques-Cartier rivers;
- 5.4 kilometres (3.4 mi) north of the village center of Stoneham-et-Tewkesbury;
- 9.3 kilometres (5.8 mi) north-west of route 175.

The Sautauriski mountain is between the Jacques-Cartier River which flows on the southwest side and the Sautauriski River which is on the east side. Access to the top of the mountain is easier on the north side. The east and southwest faces have steep cliffs.

== Mountain path ==
The "Les Loups" trail in the "Sautauriski Mountain" is the most popular with hikers in the Jacques-Cartier National Park. Very well laid out, this marked trail is under forest cover. This trail has an elevation of 452 metres (1,483 ft). The rather steep climb for the first portion of the route. Halfway, the path arrives at a first lookout nestled at an altitude of 574 metres (1,883 ft), presenting a panorama on the walls bordering the Jacques-Cartier river on the southwest face of the mountain. The next segment of the ascent is done gradually over 2.7 kilometres (1.7 mi) to the second point of view. Then, the path narrows and roughens along the sides of the mountain.

At the summit (altitude: 727 metres (2,385 ft)), hikers can admire a panorama of the relief of the Laurentian Mountains, the valleys of the Jacques-Cartier and the Sautauriski. Generally, during the weekends of September until Thanksgiving, the trail has increased foot traffic due to visitors viewing the autumn foliage. During this busy period, it is required to use a shuttle service from the Park Discovery and Access Center to access the trail head located at km 16, on the Chemin du Parc-National. The entrance to Parc national de la Jacques-Cartier is located at 103 Chemin du Parc-National, in Stoneham-et-Tewkesbury, north of the city of Québec.

== Toponymy ==
The toponym "Sautauriski mountain" is linked to the toponym of the river of the same name.

The toponym "Montagne de la Sautauriski" was formalized on August 2, 1974 at the Place Names Bank of the Commission de toponymie du Québec.

== Related articles ==
- La Jacques-Cartier Regional County Municipality
- Stoneham-et-Tewkesbury, a municipality
- Jacques-Cartier National Park
- Laurentides Wildlife Reserve
- Sautauriski River
- Jacques-Cartier River
- Lac Jacques-Cartier Massif
