= Sautauriski River =

Sautauriski River Rivière Sautauriski
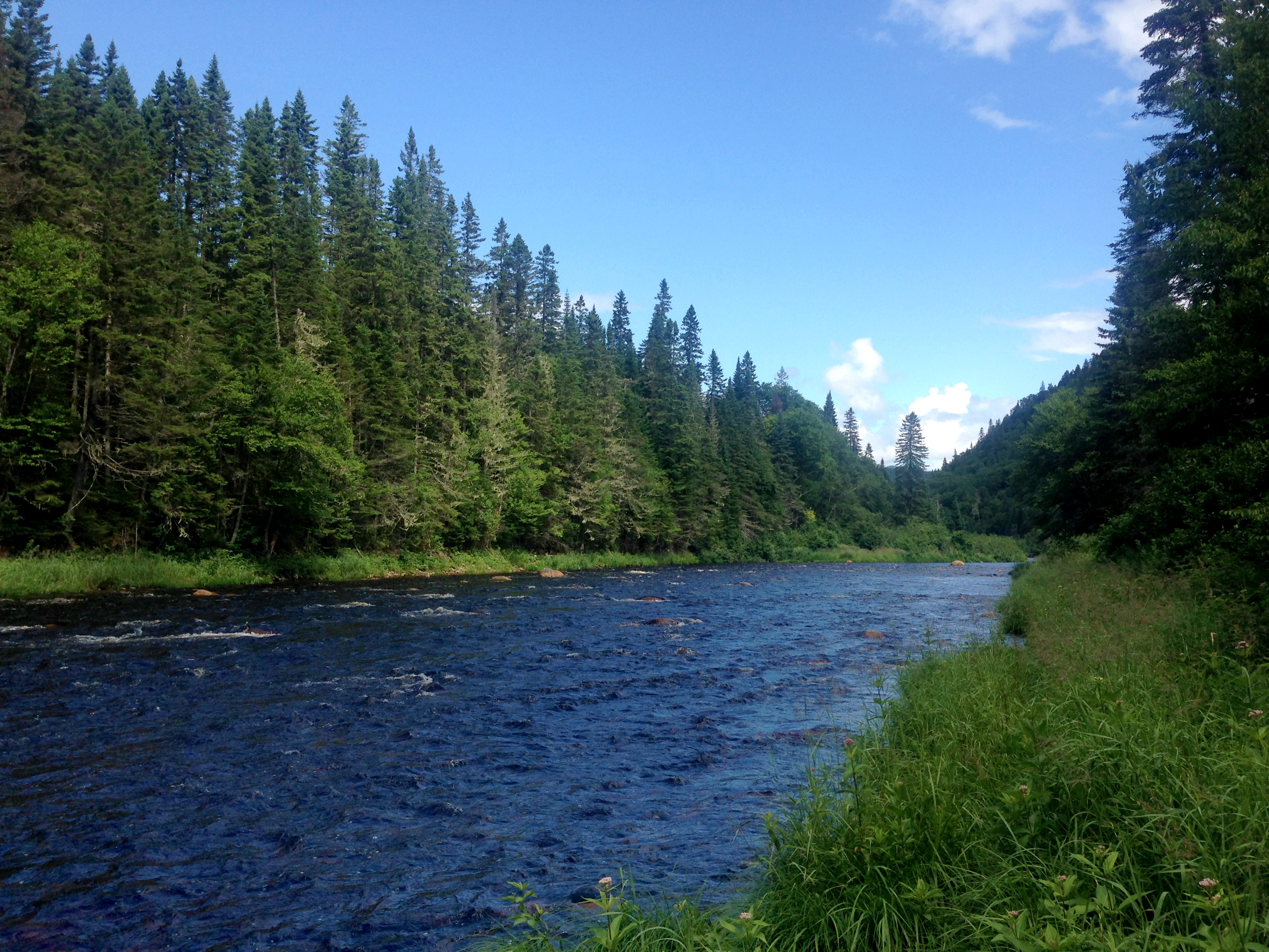

- Location within Quebec

Location
- Country: Canada
- Province: Quebec
- Region: Capitale-Nationale
- Regional County Municipality: La Jacques-Cartier and La Côte-de-Beaupré
- Unorganized territory and a municipality: Lac-Jacques-Cartier and Stoneham-et-Tewkesbury

Physical characteristics
- Source: Nouvel Lake
  - coordinates: 47°25′51″N 71°16′18″W
- Mouth: Saint Lawrence River
  - location: Donnacona
  - coordinates: 46°11′09″N 71°22′45″W
- Length: 35.1 km (21.8 mi)

Basin features
- Tributaries
  - left: (Upward from the mouth) Discharge of lac Vachon, discharge of lakes Handy and Ménard, discharge of lac Chausson (via Sautauriski Lake).
  - right: (Upward from the mouth) Rivière à la Chute, discharge of lac Giroux, discharge of lakes du Castor and Herbeux, discharge of lac Poitras (via Sautauriski Lake).

The Sautauriski River is a tributary of the Jacques-Cartier River, flowing in the administrative region of Capitale-Nationale, in Quebec, Canada. This watercourse subsequently crosses:

- the unorganized territory of Lac-Jacques-Cartier (in particular the township of Cauchon) in the Regional County Municipality (MRC) of La Côte-de-Beaupré Regional County Municipality;
- the municipality of Stoneham-et-Tewkesbury, in the MRC of La Jacques-Cartier Regional County Municipality.

The Sautauriski River is an important tributary of the Jacques-Cartier River. The course of the river flows entirely in the Jacques-Cartier National Park which is affiliated with the Société des établissements de plein air du Québec (Sépaq).

The Sautauriski River valley is mainly served on the east side by the route 175 which links the towns of Quebec and Saguenay. Few secondary roads served also this area for the needs of forestry and recreational tourism activities.

Forestry is the main economic activity in the sector; recreational tourism, second.

The surface of the Sautauriski River (except the rapids areas) is generally frozen from the beginning of December to the end of March; safe circulation on the ice is generally done from the end of December to the beginning of March.

== Geography ==
The main watersheds neighboring the Sautauriski River are:

- north side: Jacques-Cartier River, rivière à la Chute, Launière River;
- east side: Montmorency River, rivière des Neiges, rivière du Camp Brûlé;
- south side: Jacques-Cartier River, Turgeon River;
- west side: Jacques-Cartier River.

The Sautauriski River originates from Lake Nouvel (length: 1.0 kilometre (0.62 mi); altitude: 768 metres (2,520 ft)), located in the unorganized territory of Lac-Jacques-Cartier, in the La Côte-de-Beaupré Regional County Municipality. The outlet of this lake is located on the east shore has a small dam.

The Sautauriski River takes its source from Nouvel Lake (length: 1.0 kilometre (0.62 mi); altitude: 768 metres (2,520 ft)), located in the unorganized territory of Lac-Jacques-Cartier, in the MRC La Côte-de-Beaupré Regional County Municipality. Its discharge located on the east bank includes a small dam.

From Nouvel Lake, the Sautauriski River flows over 35.1 kilometres (21.8 mi), with a total drop of 489 metres (1,604 ft) according to the following segments:

- 2.3 kilometres (1.4 mi) towards the south-east, in particular by crossing part of lac Archambault (length: 2.2 kilometres (1.4 mi) ; altitude: 759 metres (2,490 ft)) on 1.4 kilometres (0.87 mi), to its mouth;

Upper Sautauriski River course (segment of 17.4 kilometres (10.8 mi))

- 8.4 metres (28 ft) to the south by crossing a marsh area, a small dam, then crossing Sautauriski Lake (length: 5.0 kilometres (3.1 mi); altitude: 744 metres (2,441 ft)) over its full length, to the Sautauriski dam at its mouth;
- 2.0 metres (6 ft 7 in) towards the south-east in an increasingly deep valley and entering the canton of Cauchon, up to the outlet (coming from the north) of Ménard and Handy lakes;
- 7.0 metres (23.0 ft) to the south in a deep valley, up to a bend in the river;

Lower Sautauriski River course (segment of 15.4 kilometres (9.6 mi))

- 5.9 metres (19 ft) first towards the west, then towards the southwest, in a deep valley, up to a bend in the river;
- 2.4 metres (7 ft 10 in) going up first to the north, then to the west, in a deep valley forming a few curves, to the outlet (coming from the north) of Lac Giroux;
- 2.5 metres (8 ft 2 in) south-west in a deep valley, until the confluence of the Chute river (coming from the north);
- 4.6 metres (15 ft) towards the south-west in a deep valley, forming a large loop towards the south-east to circumvent the mountain of Sautauriski, until its mouth.

The Sautauriski River flows on the east bank of the Jacques-Cartier River within the boundaries of the township units of Stoneham-et-Tewkesbury. From this confluence, the current follows the course of the Jacques-Cartier River generally south on 54.7 kilometres (34.0 mi) to the northeast bank of the St. Lawrence River.

== Toponymy ==
According to the Commission de toponymie du Québec, the Wendat (Huron) chief Nicolas Vincent was the first to mention the toponym, in 1829, before a special committee of the Lower Canada House of Assembly charged with to study the problem of the reduction of arable land in the St. Lawrence Valley and the consequences for Aboriginals of the concession of public land for colonization purposes. On a plan which he then erected of the territory frequented by the Wendats, the chief Vincent inscribed the form Tsoolareske. To the commissioner John Adams in charge of exploring the territory and to whom he serves as a guide, Nicolas Vincent specifies: "This river as well as the mountains are called in Huron Soulariski (the bark is long)".

In a detailed analysis of the toponym presented in his work De Québec au lac Saint-Jean or Sentiers des Laurentides: Sentier des Amérindiens, Sentier des Jésuites (1676-1703), Thomas-Edmond Giroux comes to the conclusion that he is a toponym of the Attikamek or Innu language which he translates as "the forest, it cries", of matow, "to cry" and mistik, "wood". In this place, still according to the author, "the lichens hung on the branches, the" hair of the virgin "of the coureurs de bois, had absorbed and held in suspension an infinity of drops of water from the previous rains and let them fall following days. However, this significance is today strongly questioned.

Marguerite Vincent, in The Huron Nation: Its History, Culture, Spirit (1984), takes up the interpretation of Nicolas Vincent and specifies that the Wendats went to the Sautauriski sector to obtain long barks for manufacturing canoes and basketwork. It derives the toponym of the Wendat language and of the roots atsa or arista, "bark" and eski or etsi, "long". The author also specifies that the Sautauriski was located in Innu territory and constituted a prohibited area for the Wendat. This clarification makes it possible to believe that the toponym could be of Innu origin and come from the word tshinuashkui, from tshinua, "this thing is long" and ushkui, "upper bark which is used for canoes". We should probably forget the translation "bout du museau" mentioned in Nomenclature of geographical names of the province of Quebec, of 1916.

The toponym "Sautauriski River" was formalized on December 5, 1968 at the Place Names Bank of the Commission de toponymie du Québec.

== See also ==
- Jacques-Cartier National Park
- Lac-Jacques-Cartier, an unorganized territory
- Stoneham-et-Tewkesbury
- La Côte-de-Beaupré Regional County Municipality
- La Jacques-Cartier Regional County Municipality
- Rivière à la Chute
- Jacques-Cartier River
- Sautauriski Lake, a body of water
- Sautauriski Mountain
- List of rivers of Quebec

=== External links ===
- Official site of the Jacques-Cartier National Park
