= Archambault Lake (Lac-Jacques-Cartier) =

Lake in Lac-Jacques-Cartier, Quebec, Canada

- Location in Quebec
- Location: Lac-Jacques-Cartier (TNO), La Côte-de-Beaupré Regional County Municipality, Capitale-Nationale
- Coordinates: 47.415°N 71.26278°W
- Lake type: Natural
- Primary inflows: Discharge of lac Nouvel and unidentified stream.
- Primary outflows: Sautauriski River
- Basin countries: Canada
- Max. length: 2.2 km (1.4 mi)
- Max. width: 0.7 km (0.43 mi)
- Surface area: 102 ha (0.39 sq mi)
- Surface elevation: 772 m (2,533 ft)

The Lac Archambault is a freshwater body crossed from north to south by the Sautauriski River, flowing in the unorganized territory of Lac-Jacques-Cartier, in the regional county municipality (MRC) La Côte-de-Beaupré Regional County Municipality, in the administrative region of Capitale-Nationale, in province of Quebec, in Canada.

Lac Archambault is located in Jacques-Cartier National Park.

The watershed of Lake Archambault is mainly served on the east side by the route 175 which connects the cities of Quebec and Saguenay. A few secondary roads serve this area for forestry and recreational tourism activities.

Forestry is the main economic activity in the sector; recreational tourism, second.

The surface of Lake Archambault is generally frozen from the beginning of December to the end of March; however, safe circulation on the ice is generally from late December to early March.

== Geography ==
Lake Archambault has a length of 2.2 kilometres (1.4 mi), a width of 0.7 kilometres (0.43 mi) and its surface is at an altitude of 772 metres (2,533 ft). This lake between the mountains takes the form of a triange. It is mainly fed by the outlet (coming from the northwest) of Lac Nouvel and an unidentified stream (coming from the north). Its mouth is located on the southwest bank. The lake has an area of 102.5 hectares (253 acres).

From the mouth of Lake Archambault, the current descends on 26.7 kilometres (16.6 mi) generally southward following the course of the Sautauriski River; then on generally towards the south along the current of the Jacques-Cartier River to the northeast bank of the St. Lawrence River.

== Toponymy ==
The toponymic designation of this lake was assigned in 1931 by the Commission de géographie du Québec as part of the systematic allocation of several bodies of water in Parc des Laurentides, which was partly replaced by the Laurentides Wildlife Reserve. This systematic allocation process was intended to recall the memories of soldiers from the Royal 22e Régiment who participated in the First World War. Private René Archambault was born in Montreal in 1898. Enlisted in his hometown, in March 1917, in the 245th Battalion, he was transferred to the 22nd Battalion, which became the Royal 22e Régiment. He died in August 1918, during the Battle of Chérisy, in France.

The toponym Lac Archambault was formalized on December 5, 1968, by the Commission de toponymie du Québec.

== See also ==
- Jacques-Cartier National Park
- La Côte-de-Beaupré Regional County Municipality
- Lac-Jacques-Cartier, a TNO
- Sautauriski LakeLac-Jacques-Cartier
- Sautauriski River
- List of lakes of Canada
