= Archambault Lake (Saint-Donat) =

Lake in Saint-Donat, Quebec, Canada

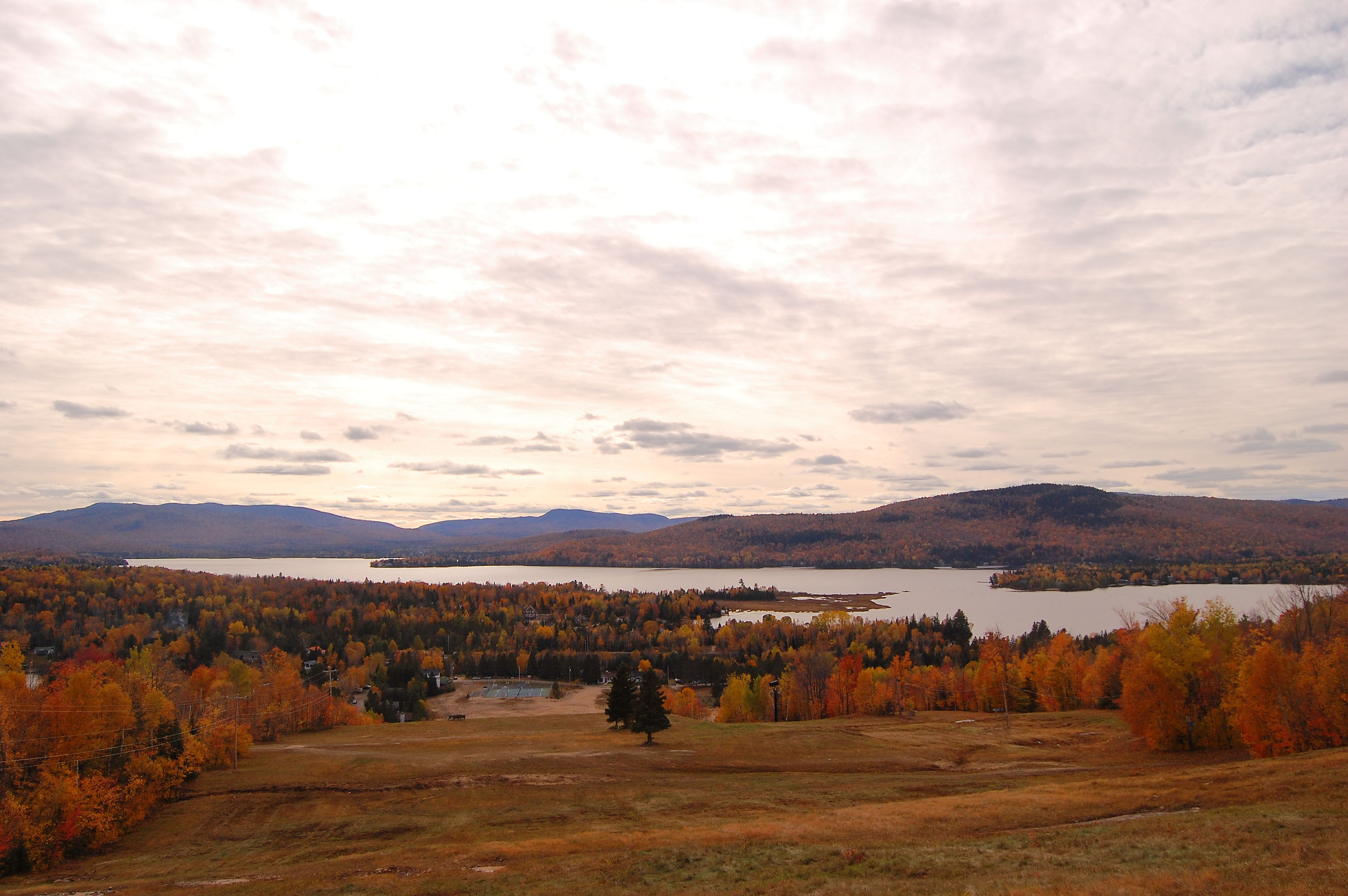

- Location in Quebec
- Location: Saint-Donat (Municipality), MRC Matawinie, Lanaudière
- Coordinates: 46.320497°N 74.239941°W
- Lake type: Natural
- Primary inflows: (Clockwise from the mouth) Discharge of Lac Beauchamp, discharge of an unidentified lake, Saint-Michel River, discharge of lakes Ovila and Coutu, discharge of Lac du Pimbina.
- Primary outflows: Discharge going to Lake Ouareau
- Basin countries: Canada
- Max. length: 12 km (7.5 mi)
- Max. width: 0.5 km (0.31 mi)
- Surface area: 14 km^{2} (5.4 sq mi)
- Surface elevation: 390 m (1,280 ft)

The lac Archambault is a lake located at Saint-Donat, in the Matawinie Regional County Municipality, in Lanaudière, in Quebec, Canada. Its discharge drains to the southeast in Lake Ouareau. This lake is located on the line separating the townships of Archambault and Lussier, immediately west of Lake Ouareau into which it flows.

Recreational and tourist activities, especially vacationing, are the main economic activity around the lake; forestry, second. The shores all around Lake Archambault are highly renowned for vacationing, particularly because of the forest, mountain environment, recreational tourism, road access and its position south of the Mont-Tremblant National Park. The village of Saint-Donat-de-Montcalm, an imposing resort and service center, is located on the peninsula between the eastern shore of Lake Archambault and the western shore of Lake Ouareau.

The lake Archambault is surrounded by Régimbald road. The route 125 passes in the village of Saint-Donat and the route 329 serve the eastern part du lac.

The surface of Lake Archambault is generally frozen from the beginning of December to the end of March; safe circulation on the ice is generally done from the end of December to the beginning of March.

== Geography ==
The main neighboring hydrographic slopes are:

- north side: Lac Provost, Matawin River;
- east side: Lake Ouareau, Ouareau River;
- south side: Lac de la Montagne Noire,
- west side: Saint-Michel River, Le Boulé River, Saint-Martin stream.

Lake Archambault takes the form of a zigzag (north–south orientation) becoming narrower in the southern bay. The northern part of the lake has two bays: baie de l'Ours (Bear Bay) (to the northwest) and Tire Lake (to the northeast). A peninsula attached to the west bank extends 1.7 kilometres (1.1 mi) to the east, delimiting the bay from the south which stretches 4.4 kilometres (2.7 mi) to the south. This bay surrounded by resorts is located at the foot of Mont Gaudet (peaking at 771 metres (2,530 ft)) and Mont Jasper (peaking at 762 metres (2,500 ft)).

== Toponymy ==
The toponym is sometimes explained by the evocation of a pioneer from the surrounding area. More plausible, however, and better documented, appears the attribution, as for the canton, of the patronymic of the notary Louis Archambeault or Archambault (1814-1890), deputy, minister and legislative adviser. As early as 1880, Eugène Taché registered “L. Archambault” and the homonymous canton on his map of Quebec.

— Commission de toponymie, Québec

.

From 1915, vacationers interested in hunting, fishing and the outdoors settled on the banks. Since that time, the recreotourism vocation of the region is in continuous growth.

The toponym "lac Archambault" would evoke, as for the canton, the patronymic of the notary Louis Archambeault or Archambault (1814-1890), deputy, minister and legislative adviser. As early as 1880, Eugène Taché also registered "L. Archambault ”as well as the homonymous canton on its map of Quebec. Lac Archambault, listed as Archambeault in the Nomenclature of Geographical Names for the Province of Quebec in 1916, was once used for particularly intense logging in the second half of the 19th century.

=== Pictures ===
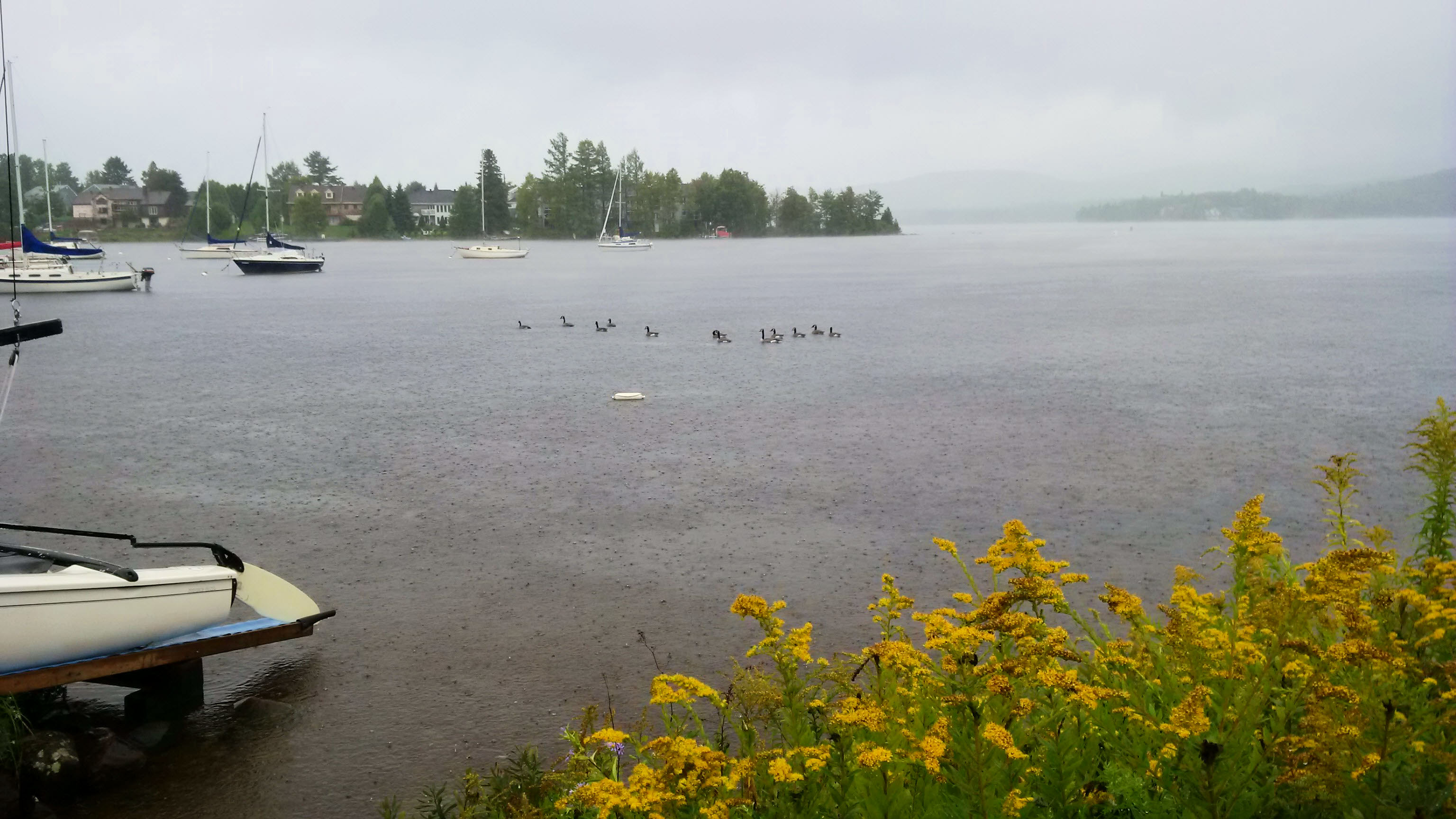
Geese rest in front of the Pioneer Park.

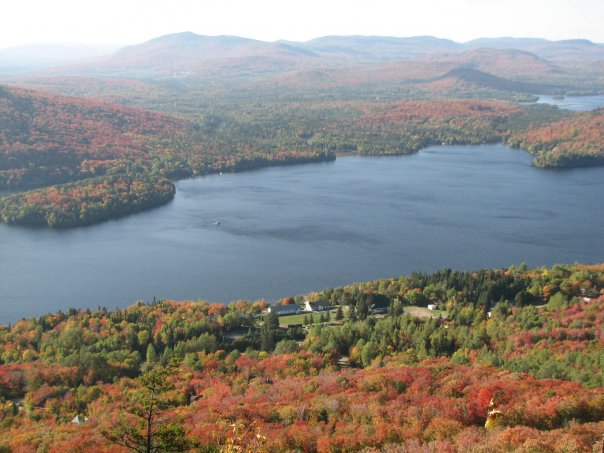
The Campus of the Four Winds, on the edge of the lake.

== See also ==
- Matawinie Regional County Municipality
- Saint-Donat
- Saint-Michel River
- Lake Ouareau
- Ouareau River
- List of lakes of Canada
