= Sautauriski Lake =

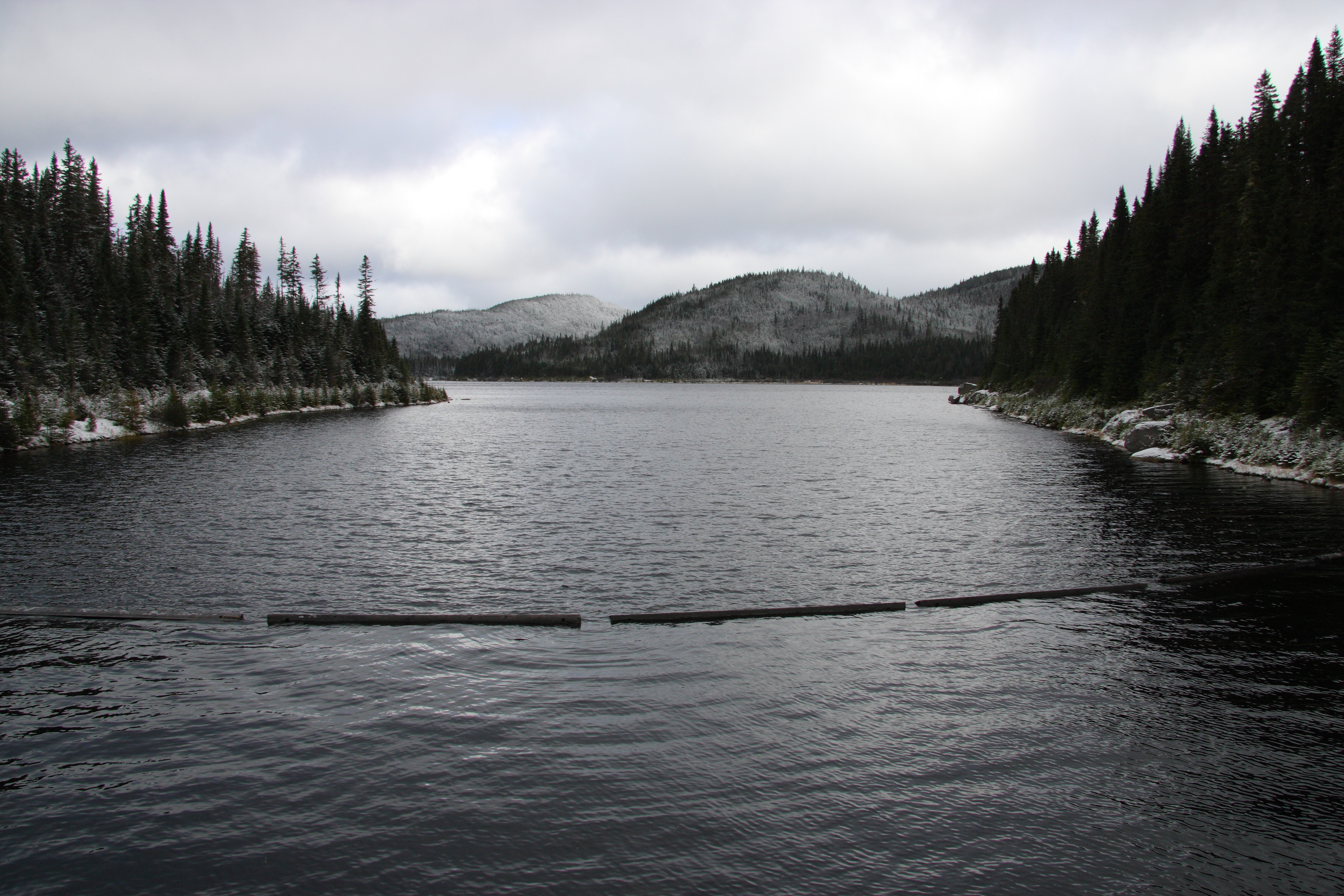

- Location in Quebec
- Location: Lac-Jacques-Cartier (TNO), La Côte-de-Beaupré Regional County Municipality, Capitale-Nationale
- Coordinates: 47.36611°N 71.29139°W
- Lake type: Lake of dam
- Primary inflows: (clockwise from the mouth) Discharge of lac Poitras, Sautauriski River (discharge of lac Archambault), discharge of lac Chausson.
- Primary outflows: Sautauriski River
- Basin countries: Canada
- Max. length: 5.0 km (3.1 mi)
- Max. width: 0.9 km (0.56 mi)
- Surface elevation: 744 m (2,441 ft)

Lake Sautauriski is a freshwater body crossed from north to south by the Sautauriski River, flowing in the unorganized territory of Lac-Jacques-Cartier, in the La Côte-de-Beaupré Regional County Municipality, in the administrative region of Capitale-Nationale, in province of Quebec, in Canada.

Sautauriski Lake is located in Jacques-Cartier National Park.

The watershed area of Sautauriski Lake is mainly served on the east side by the route 175 which links the towns of Quebec and Saguenay. Few secondary roads served also this area for the needs of forestry and recreational tourism activities.

Forestry is the main economic activity in the sector; recreational tourism, second.

The surface of Lake Sautauriski is generally frozen from the beginning of December to the end of March; safe circulation on the ice is generally done from the end of December to the beginning of March.

== Geography ==
Lake Sautauriski has a length of 5.0 kilometres (3.1 mi), a width of 0.9 kilometres (0.56 mi) and its surface is at an altitude of 744 metres (2,441 ft). The Sautauriski dam is located at its mouth, at the bottom of a bay in the southern part of the lake. This lake encased between the mountains has five large bays, the longest of which stretches over 1.9 kilometres (1.2 mi) to the northeast and receives from the northeast the discharge from the Sautauriski River. Lac Fossambault is located 0.4 kilometres (0.25 mi) to the west.

The lake has an area of 1.9 square kilometres (0.73 sq mi). Despite its small size, it is the largest of the 216 bodies of water in Jacques-Cartier National Park. We find at the mouth of the lake the Sautauriski dam, which has a height of 6.9 metres (23 ft) and a capacity of 14,042,500 metres (46,071,194.226 ft).

From the dam at the mouth of Lake Sautauriski, the current descends for 24.4 kilometres (15.2 mi) generally southward following the course of the Sautauriski River; then generally south on along the current of the Jacques-Cartier river to the northeast shore of the St. Lawrence River.

== Toponymy ==
The toponym "Lac Sautauriski" was formalized on December 5, 1968, by the Commission de toponymie du Québec.

== Notes and references ==
- Corporation du bassin de la Jacques-Cartier (2013). "Plan directeur de l'eau de la zone de gestion intégrée de l'eau de la Jacques-Cartier" (PDF) (in French).

== See also ==
- Jacques-Cartier National Park
- La Côte-de-Beaupré Regional County Municipality
- Lac-Jacques-Cartier, an unorganized territory
- Sautauriski River
- Jacques-Cartier River
- List of lakes of Canada
