= Henri-Mercier Lake =

Lake in Quebec, Canada

- Location in Quebec
- Location: Lac-Jacques-Cartier (TNO), La Côte-de-Beaupré Regional County Municipality, Capitale-Nationale
- Coordinates: 47.4875°N 71.59611°W
- Lake type: Natural
- Primary inflows: (clockwise from the mouth) Discharge of lakes Pellucide, Rothnie and du Préfet, discharge of lac Peggy
- Primary outflows: Discharge going to Rivière Jacques-Cartier Nord-Ouest
- Basin countries: Canada
- Max. length: 6.3 km (3.9 mi)
- Max. width: 0.7 km (0.43 mi)
- Surface elevation: 662 m (2,172 ft)

The Lac Henri-Mercier is a freshwater body whose discharge spills into the rivière Jacques-Cartier Nord-Ouest, in the unorganized territory of Lac-Jacques-Cartier, in the La Côte-de-Beaupré Regional County Municipality, in the administrative region of Capitale-Nationale, in province of Quebec, in Canada.

Lac Henri-Mercier is located in the Jacques-Cartier National Park.

This small valley is served by a few secondary roads serving this area for the needs of forestry, recreational tourism activities.

Forestry is the main economic activity in the sector; recreational tourism, second.

The surface of Lac Henri-Mercier is generally frozen from the beginning of December to the end of March, but safe circulation on the ice is generally made from mid-December to mid-March.

== Geography ==
The main watersheds near Lake Henri-Mercier are:

- north side: F.-X.-Lemieux Lake, Cavée River, Rivière Jacques-Cartier Nord-Ouest;
- east side: lac Charles-Savary, Rivière Jacques-Cartier Nord-Ouest, rivière Jacques-Cartier Sud, Jacques-Cartier River;
- south side: Petit lac Jacques-Cartier, Tourilli River, Sainte-Anne River;
- west side: Rivière Jacques-Cartier Nord-Ouest, rivière à Moïse.

Enclosed between the mountains, the Petit lac Jacques-Cartier has a length of 6.3 kilometres (3.9 mi), a width of 0.7 kilometres (0.43 mi) and an altitude of 662 metres (2,172 ft). This lengthwise lake has a bulge of land attached to the south shore, and a peninsula attached to the north shore. This lake is mainly fed by the outlet of Pellucide, Rothnie and Préfet lakes, as well as the outlet of Peggy Lake.

Located at the bottom of a small bay to the northeast, the mouth of this lake has a dam. This mouth is located at:

- 0.7 kilometres (0.43 mi) south-west of the mouth of its own landfill;
- 4.4 kilometres (2.7 mi) north-west of the confluence of the Rivière Jacques-Cartier Sud and Rivière Jacques-Cartier Nord-Ouest;
- 14.7 kilometres (9.1 mi) north-west of the confluence of the Rivière Jacques-Cartier Nord-Ouest and the Jacques-Cartier River.

From the mouth of Petit lac Jacques-Cartier, the current flows in the following segments:

- 1.6 kilometres (0.99 mi) towards the northeast following the course of its own discharge;
- 16.7 kilometres (10.4 mi) to the east down the Rivière Jacques-Cartier Nord-Ouest;
- towards the south following the current of the Jacques-Cartier River, to the northwest shore of the Saint-Laurent river.

== Toponymy ==
The denomination "Lac Henri-Mercier" has been used since 1942 to designate this body of water. Previously, it was designated "Lac Paul". The Commission de géographie de Québec, the current Commission de toponymie du Québec, adopted this name on March 5, 1959. Subsequently, the toponym "lac Henri-Mercier" was formalized on December 5, 1968, by the Commission de toponymie du Québec.

== See also ==
- Laurentides Wildlife Reserve
- Jacques-Cartier National Park
- La Côte-de-Beaupré Regional County Municipality (MRC)
- Lac-Jacques-Cartier, a TNO
- Rivière Jacques-Cartier Nord-Ouest
- Jacques-Cartier River
- List of lakes of Canada
