= Chézine =

Chézine may refer to:

- Chézine Lake, a body of water of the Chézine River, in Lac-Croche, Quebec, Canada
- Chézine River (Sainte-Anne River), a tributary of the Sainte-Anne River, in Quebec, Canada
- Chézine North River, a tributary of the Chézine River in Quebec, Canada
