= Rivière du Milieu (Launière River tributary) =

- Location within Quebec

Location
- Country: Canada
- Province: Quebec
- Region: Capitale-Nationale
- Regional County Municipality: La Côte-de-Beaupré Regional County Municipality
- Unorganized territory: Lac-Jacques-Cartier

Physical characteristics
- Source: Warbonne Lake
  - location: Lac-Jacques-Cartier
  - coordinates: 47.61015°N 71.31736°W
  - elevation: 857 m (2,812 ft)
- Mouth: Launière River
  - location: Lac-Jacques-Cartier
  - coordinates: 47.48417°N 71.41°W
  - elevation: 630 m (2,070 ft)
- Length: 24.0 km (14.9 mi)
- Discharge
  - location: Lac-Jacques-Cartier

Basin features
- Tributaries
  - left: (Upward from the mouth) Décharge du lac Dupuis, décharge du lac Roy, décharge (via le Lac Maigre) des lac Valois et Petit Lac Valois, ruisseau non identifié (via le Lac Maigre), décharge des lacs Sirois et Petit lac Sirois, décharge d'un petit lac (comportant un barrage).
  - right: (Upward from the mouth) Ruisseau non identifié, décharge des lacs Loyer, du Bout et Lakas, décharge du lac Mabile, décharge du lac Cayer, décharge du lac Kay, décharge du lac de la Corniche, décharge du lac du Corridor..

The Rivière du Milieu is a tributary of the Launière River, flowing in the unorganized territory of Lac-Jacques-Cartier, in the La Côte-de-Beaupré Regional County Municipality, in the administrative region of Capitale-Nationale, in the province of Quebec, at Canada.

This watercourse is located in the center of the Laurentides Wildlife Reserve. This valley is indirectly accessible by the route 175 (route Antonio-Talbot). Secondary forest roads serve the sector for forestry and recreational tourism activities, in particular the forest road R0320 which runs on the north side of lakes Maigre and Valois and crosses the Middle River upstream of Lake Maigre.

Forestry is the main economic activity in the sector; recreational tourism, second.

The surface of the Middle River (except the rapids areas) is usually frozen from the end of November to the beginning of April, however the safe circulation on the ice is generally done from mid-December to the end of March.

== Geography ==
The main watersheds neighboring the Rivière du Milieu are:

- north side: Launière River, Honorine Lake;
- east side: Jacques-Cartier River, Jacques-Cartier Lake;
- south side: Jacques-Cartier River, Launière River, Rocheuse River;
- west side: Launière River, Champlain lake, Cavée River.

The "rivière du Milieu" has its source at the mouth of Warbonne Lake (length: 1.3 kilometres (0.81 mi); altitude: 857 metres (2,812 ft)). This lake is enclosed between mountains whose summit culminates at 983 metres (3,225 ft) to the west and 1,001 metres (3,284 ft) to the east. This lake has two outlets:

- South side: after a channel of a hundred meters, the current flows into a small lake (length: 0.5 kilometres (0.31 mi)) where a dam has been built at its mouth. After this dam, the current continues on 1.6 kilometres (0.99 mi) first towards the south, then branches off towards the west to join the main course of the Rivière du Milieu;
- North side: the current flows on 4.7 kilometres (2.9 mi) first towards the north on 2.6 kilometres (1.6 mi) by collecting two streams coming from the north-east, up to a dam; then south on 2.1 kilometres (1.3 mi) by collecting the outlet (from the north) from the Corridor Lake, until the confluence of the outlet of the first outfall from Warbonne Lake.

From the confluence of the two outlets from the emissaries of Lake Warbonne, the course of the Rivière du Milieu descends on 19.3 kilometres (12.0 mi), with a drop of 227 metres (745 ft). Its course is described according to the following segments:

- 1.5 kilometres (0.93 mi) south to the outlet (coming from the west) Lac Kay;
- 1.0 kilometre (0.62 mi) towards the south-east by collecting the outlet (coming from the southwest) from Cayer lake, up to the outlet (coming from the north) from lakes Beauséjour, Sirois and Petit lac Sirois;
- 9.7 kilometres (6.0 mi) to the south in a deep valley forming some serpentines, crossing on 0.7 kilometres (0.43 mi) the western end of Lac Maigre (length: 1.7 kilometres (1.1 mi); altitude: 756 kilometres (470 mi)) up to the dam built at its mouth;
- 2.6 kilometres (1.6 mi) to the south by collecting the discharge (coming from the west) from Loyer and Bout lakes, then forming a loop towards the east, up to a bend in the river, corresponding at the outlet of a stream (coming from the south-west);
- 1.4 kilometres (0.87 mi) south-east, to the outlet (coming from the east) of Lac Roy and Lac Reg;
- 3.1 kilometres (1.9 mi) to the south-west in a deep valley at the end of the segment, to its mouth.

The current of the Rivière du Milieu flows into a river T on the east bank of the Launière River. From there, the current over 2.4 kilometres (1.5 mi) towards the south-east in a deep valley and forming a small curve towards the north-east to go around a mountain, until its mouth. Then the current follows the course of the Jacques-Cartier River on , to the northwest shore of the Saint-Laurent river, at Sainte-Catherine-de-la-Jacques-Cartier.

== Toponym ==
The toponym "Rivière du Milieu" was formalized on June 6, 1973, at the Place Names Bank of the Commission de toponymie du Québec.

== See also ==
- List of rivers of Quebec
