= Tourilli =

Tourilli may refer to:

- Tourilli Lake, body of water of Lac-Croche, Quebec, Canada
- Tourilli River, watercourse of Saint-Gabriel-de-Valcartier, Quebec, Canada
