= Launière =

Launière may refer to:

- Launière River, Quebec, Canada
- Launière Lake, Quebec, Canada
- Soleil Launière (fl. from 2019), Innu writer, actress, performance artist and musician from Canada
