= Honorine =

Honorine may refer to:

- Honorina (French: Honorine), French saint
- Honorine (novel), 1843 novel by Balzac
- Honorine Lake, in Lac-Jacques-Cartier, La Côte-de-Beaupré Regional County Municipality, Capitale-Nationale, Quebec, Canada

== See also ==
- Conflans-Sainte-Honorine, a commune in the Yvelines department in north-central France
