= Chézine Lake =

Lake in Quebec, Canada

- Location in Quebec
- Location: Lac-Croche (TNO), La Jacques-Cartier Regional County Municipality, Capitale-Nationale, Quebec
- Coordinates: 47.22694°N 71.67805°W
- Lake type: Natural
- Primary outflows: Chézine River
- Basin countries: Canada
- Max. length: 1.7 km (1.1 mi)
- Max. width: 0.4 km (0.25 mi)
- Surface elevation: 677 m (2,221 ft)

The lac Chézine (English: Chézine Lake) is a freshwater body in the head area of the Chézine River, in the unorganized territory of Lac-Croche, in the La Jacques-Cartier Regional County Municipality, in the administrative region of Capitale-Nationale, in the province of Quebec, in Canada. Lac Chézine is located at the boundary of the southwestern part of the Jacques-Cartier National Park which is included in the Laurentides Wildlife Reserve.

The east side of Lake Chézine is served by the forest road R0300 (north–south direction).

Forestry is the main economic activity in the sector; recreational tourism, second.

The surface of Lake Chézine is usually frozen from the beginning of December to the end of March, however the safe circulation on the ice is generally made from mid-December to mid-March.

== Geography ==
The main hydrographic slopes near Lake Chézine are:

- North side: Lac Tourilli;
- East side: Chézine North River, Tourilli River, Sainte-Anne River;
- South side: Chézine River, Chézine North River, Sainte-Anne River;
- West side: Nelson River, Leclerc stream.

The Chézine River rises at the mouth of Chézine Lake (length: 1.7 kilometres (1.1 mi); altitude 677 metres (2,221 ft)) in the unorganized territory of Lac-Croche . This lake between the mountains is fed by only two mountain streams. A mountain peak culminates at 802 metres (2,631 ft) at 0.9 kilometres (0.56 mi) north of the lake. The mouth of Lake Chézine is located 13.9 kilometres (8.6 mi) west of the course of the Jacques-Cartier River, 27.3 kilometres (17.0 mi) north of the center of village of Saint-Raymond and 74.6 kilometres (46.4 mi) north of the confluence of the Sainte-Anne River with the Saint Lawrence River.

From the mouth of Lake Chézine, the current descends on 17.3 kilometres (10.7 mi) towards the south-east following the course of the Chézine River, then on 115.8 kilometres (72.0 mi) generally south and southwest following the course of the Sainte-Anne River, to the northwest shore of the St. Lawrence River.

== Toponymy ==
The toponym "Lac Chézine" was formalized on December 5, 1968, by the Commission de toponymie du Québec.

== See also ==
- Laurentides Wildlife Reserve
- La Jacques-Cartier Regional County Municipality
- Lac-Croche, an unorganized territory
- Sainte-Anne River (Mauricie)
- Chézine River
- List of lakes in Canada
