= Rieutard =

Rieutard may refer to:

- Rieutard Lake, a lake at the head of the Cavée River, in Lac-Jacques-Cartier, Quebec, Canada

== See also ==
- Rieutord, a tributary of the Hérault river in France
