= Rieutard Lake =

Freshwater lake in Quebec, Canada

- Location in Quebec
- Location: Lac-Jacques-Cartier (TNO), La Côte-de-Beaupré Regional County Municipality, Capitale-Nationale, Quebec
- Coordinates: 47.70278°N 71.43472°W
- Lake type: Natural
- Primary inflows: Discharge of a set of lakes and five streams
- Primary outflows: Cavée River
- Basin countries: Canada
- Max. length: 1.1 km (0.68 mi)
- Max. width: 0.4 km (0.25 mi)
- Surface elevation: 808 m (2,651 ft)

Lac Rieutard (English: Rieutard Lake) is a freshwater body from the watershed of the Jacques-Cartier River, and sub-basins of the Rivière Jacques-Cartier Nord-Ouest and Cavée River, in the unorganized territory of Lac-Jacques-Cartier, in the La Côte-de-Beaupré Regional County Municipality, in the administrative region of Capitale-Nationale, in the province of Quebec, in Canada.

The area around the lake is served by a secondary forest road which passes on the east side.

Forestry is the main economic activity in the sector; recreational tourism, second. Lac Rieutard is located in the heart of the Laurentides Wildlife Reserve.

The surface of Rieutard Lake is usually frozen from the beginning of December to the end of March, however the safe circulation on the ice is generally made from mid-December to mid-March.

== Geography ==
The main watersheds near Lake Rieutard are:

- north side: Franchère Lake, Germain lake, Joyal stream;
- east side: Côte l'Enfer stream, Jacques-Cartier River;
- south side: Cavée River, Rivière Jacques-Cartier Nord-Ouest;
- west side: rivière aux Écorces du Milieu.

The "Lac Rieutard" has a length of 1.1 kilometres (0.68 mi), a width of 0.4 kilometres (0.25 mi) and an altitude of 808 metres (2,651 ft). In addition to the discharge (coming from the east) of a group of lakes (Mérillon, Dugas, de la Rocaille, Hardy, Joug and Dan), this lake is also fed by five riparian streams. It has three small islands. The mouth of Rieutard Lake is located to the southeast, at:

- 19.3 kilometres (12.0 mi) North of the confluence of the Cavée River and the rivière Jacques-Cartier Nord-Ouest;
- 33.8 kilometres (21.0 mi) north-west of the confluence of the rivière Jacques-Cartier Nord-Ouest and the Jacques-Cartier River;
- 116.6 kilometres (72.5 mi) north of the confluence of the Jacques-Cartier River and Saint-Laurent river.

From the mouth of Rieutard Lake, the current follows the course of the Cavée River consecutively over 30.3 kilometres (18.8 mi) to the south, the course of the rivière Jacques-Cartier Nord-Ouest on 23.9 kilometres (14.9 mi) generally west, then north, the course of the Jacques-Cartier River on 60.2 kilometres (37.4 mi) generally south, to Donnacona where it merges with the Estuary of Saint Lawrence.

== Toponymy ==
The term "Rieutard" constitutes a family name of French origin. In history, this patronym has spread particularly in France and Louisiana.

The Bulletin of Historical Research, vol. XVIII, 1912, page 3, published: "Doctors Rieutord Père et Fils On the Nancy in the harbor of Quebec, in 1759, was a Gascon. Jean-Baptiste Rieutord, surgeon, from Grammont. He came, without suspecting that the country would soon pass to England, to settle in Canada. He settled in Baie Saint-Paul where he married in 1758, a young and valiant Canadian, Pélagie Perron, nineteen years old. From there, he went to Château-Richer where he raised his family... "

The toponym "Lac Rieutard" was formalized on December 5, 1968, by the Commission de toponymie du Québec.

== See also ==
- List of lakes of Canada
