= Rivière Jacques-Cartier Sud =

- Location within Quebec

Location
- Country: Canada
- Province: Quebec
- Region: Capitale-Nationale
- Regional County Municipality: La Côte-de-Beaupré Regional County Municipality
- Unorganized territory: Lac-Jacques-Cartier

Physical characteristics
- Source: Petit lac Jacques-Cartier
  - location: Lac-Jacques-Cartier
  - coordinates: 47.41119°N 71.51265°W
  - elevation: 674 m (2,211 ft)
- Mouth: Jacques-Cartier River
  - location: Lac-Jacques-Cartier
  - coordinates: 47.40722°N 71.53°W
  - elevation: 650 m (2,130 ft)
- Length: 6.5 km (4.0 mi)
- Discharge
  - location: Lac-Jacques-Cartier

Basin features
- Tributaries
  - left: Ruisseau non identifié.
  - right: (Upward from the mouth) Décharge du lac Saint-Hilaire, décharge du Lac de l'Écuyer.

The Jacques-Cartier South River is a tributary of the rivière Jacques-Cartier Nord-Ouest, located in the unorganized territory of Lac-Jacques-Cartier, in the La Côte-de-Beaupré Regional County Municipality, in the administrative region of Capitale-Nationale, in Quebec, Canada. The course of the river passes in particular in the Jacques-Cartier National Park. The head water is Petit lac Jacques-Cartier.

Forestry is the main economic activity in the sector; recreational tourism, second.

The surface of the "rivière Jacques-Cartier Sud" (except the rapids zones) is generally frozen from the beginning of December to the end of March, but the safe circulation on the ice is generally made from the end of December to the beginning of March.

== Geography ==
The main watersheds neighboring the Jacques-Cartier South River are:

- north side: Rivière Jacques-Cartier Nord-Ouest, Charles-Savary lake;
- east side: Rivière Jacques-Cartier Nord-Ouest, Jacques-Cartier River, Rocheuse River;
- south side: Petit lac Jacques-Cartier, lac Gregory, Tourilli River, Rivière Sainte-Anne;
- west side: Rivière Jacques-Cartier Nord-Ouest.

The Jacques-Cartier South River originates at Petit lac Jacques-Cartier (length: 3.9 kilometres (2.4 mi); altitude: 674 metres (2,211 ft), located in unorganized territory du Lac-Jacques-Cartier, in the La Côte-de-Beaupré Regional County Municipality.

From the dam at the mouth of Petit lac Jacques-Cartier, the Jacques-Cartier South river flows over 6.5 kilometres (4.0 mi), with a total drop of 24 metres (79 ft), according to the following segments:

- 2.5 kilometres (1.6 mi) towards the north by forming a curve towards the east by collecting the outlet (coming from the east) of Lac de l'Écuyer, up to the outlet (coming from the north) of Lake Saint-Hilaire;
- 4.0 kilometres (2.5 mi) northwards to its mouth.

From the confluence of the Jacques-Cartier North-West river, the current flows over 11.7 kilometres (7.3 mi) east, south-east, then east, following the course of the Jacques-Cartier North West River; then on south by the course of the Jacques-Cartier River to the northeast bank of the Saint-Laurent river.

== Toponymy ==
Jacques Cartier (Saint-Malo, France, 1491 - Saint-Malo, 1557), explorer and navigator, made three trips to Canada between 1534 and 1542. He s adventure in the New World in 1534, commissioned by François I to find gold and a passage to Asia. He explored Anticosti Island, the Gulf of St. Lawrence and, on July 24, he erected a cross in the bay of Gaspé as a sign of appropriation of the site. During his second journey, in 1535, Cartier went up the St. Lawrence River to Hochelaga (Montreal) and spent a difficult winter in Stadaconé (Quebec). Finally, in 1541, under the orders of Roberval, Cartier attempted to establish the first French colony in America. It settles at the mouth of the Cap-Rouge river which it names Charlesbourg-Royal. Cartier left the colony in June 1542, while Roberval was on his way to Canada. They meet in Newfoundland, and Cartier chooses to return to Saint-Malo. First cartographer of the St. Lawrence, he recognizes that the gold and diamonds found turn out to be iron pyrite and quartz.

The toponym "rivière Jacques-Cartier Sud" was formalized on September 28, 2007, at the Place Names Bank of the Commission de toponymie du Québec.

== See also ==
- Jacques-Cartier National Park
- Lac-Jacques-Cartier, a TNO
- La Côte-de-Beaupré Regional County Municipality
- Capitale-Nationale, an administrative region
- Rivière Jacques-Cartier Nord-Ouest
- Jacques-Cartier River
- Petit lac Jacques-Cartier
- List of rivers of Quebec

=== External links ===
- Corporation du bassin de la Jacques-Cartier
- Parc de la Jacques-Cartier
- Canadian Heritage Rivers System
