= Gregory Lake (La Jacques-Cartier) =

Lake in Quebec, Canada

- Location in Quebec
- Location: Lac-Croche (TNO), La Jacques-Cartier Regional County Municipality (MRC), Capitale-Nationale
- Coordinates: 47.35528°N 71.58945°W
- Lake type: Natural
- Primary inflows: (Clockwise from the mouth) Tourilli River, outlet of Lac des Doradilles, the outlet of a group of lakes including Hunau, Crochetière and Pleurotes, and the outlet of lakes Fruze, Chesnay, Godman, Etheleen, Petit lac Etheleen and du Piedmont
- Primary outflows: Tourilli River
- Basin countries: Canada
- Max. length: 2.3 km (1.4 mi)
- Max. width: 1.1 km (0.68 mi)
- Surface elevation: 634 m (2,080 ft)
- Islands: 3

Lac Gregory is a body of fresh water crossed from north to south by the Tourilli River, located in the Laurentides Wildlife Reserve, in the unorganized territory of Lac-Croche, in the La Jacques-Cartier Regional County Municipality, administrative region of Capitale-Nationale, in province from Quebec, to Canada.

The watershed of Gregory Lake is served by a few secondary forest roads for the needs of forestry and recreational tourism activities.

Forestry is the main economic activity in the sector; recreational tourism, second.

The surface of Lake Gregory is generally frozen from the beginning of December to the end of March; safe circulation on the ice is generally done from the end of December to the beginning of March.

== Geography ==
Lake Gregory has a length of 2.3 kilometres (1.4 mi), a width of 1.1 kilometres (0.68 mi) and its surface is at an altitude of 634 metres (2,080 ft). This lake between the mountains is akin to the following three bays:

- the first stretches over 0.8 kilometres (0.50 mi) towards the north while bending towards the east and receives the discharge of Lac des Doradilles, as well as the discharge of a set of lakes including Hunau, Crochetière Oyster mushrooms;
- the second on 0.4 kilometres (0.25 mi) to the east and receives the discharge from lakes Fruze, Chesnay, Godman, Etheleen, Petit lac Etheleen and du Piedmont;
- the third on 0.6 kilometres (0.37 mi) south to its mouth.

The mouth of Gregory Lake is located 2.7 kilometres (1.7 mi) northeast of Tourilli Lake, 10.4 kilometres (6.5 mi) west of the course of Jacques-Cartier River and 32.5 kilometres (20.2 mi) north of the confluence of the Tourilli River and the Sainte-Anne River.

From the mouth of Gregory Lake, the current descends on 45.7 kilometres (28.4 mi) generally towards the south, following the course of the Tourilli river to its confluence with the Sainte-Anne River; thence, the current generally flows south along the current of the Sainte-Anne river to the northeast bank of the Saint-Laurent river.

== Toponymy ==
The toponym "Lac Gregory" was formalized on December 5, 1968, by the Commission de toponymie du Québec.

== See also ==
- Laurentides Wildlife Reserve
- La Jacques-Cartier Regional County Municipality
- Lac-Jacques-Cartier, an unorganized territory
- Tourilli Lake
- Tourilli River
- Sainte-Anne River
- List of lakes of Canada

== Bibliography ==
- CAPSA (2014). Plans directeurs de l'eau des secteurs d'intervention de la zone de gestion de la CAPSA: Sainte-Anne, Portneuf et La Chevrotière (Water master plans of the intervention sectors of the CAPSA management area: Sainte-Anne, Portneuf and La Chevrotière) (PDF) (in French). Quebec: CAPSA. p. 691. Archived from the original (PDF) on 2019-02-14.
