= Forêt ancienne de la Rivière-Chézine =

Protected area in Quebec, Canada

- IUCN category III (natural monument or feature)
- Location within Quebec
- Location: Saint-Gabriel-de-Valcartier, Capitale-Nationale, Quebec, Canada
- Coordinates: 47°08′54″N 71°38′55″W
- Established: 2007
- Administrator: Ministry of Energy and Natural Resources

The Rivière-Chézine old forest is an exceptional forest ecosystems of Quebec located in Saint-Gabriel-de-Valcartier, in La Jacques-Cartier Regional County Municipality, in administrative region of Capitale-Nationale, in the province of Quebec, Canada. It protects a yellow birch to fir who is over 160 years (5,000 Ms). It is located in zec Batiscan-Neilson.

== Toponymy ==
The Rivière-Chézine old forest takes its name from the Chézine River (Sainte-Anne River), which borders it on the northeast side. The name of the watercourse, of unknown origin, was noted in 1945.

== Geography ==
The Rivière-Chézine Old Forest is located 50 kilometres (31 mi) northwest of Quebec, in the municipality of Saint-Gabriel-de-Valcartier. It has an area of 49 hectares (120 acres). The forest is located in a mountainous region interspersed with deep valleys with steep slopes. The forest itself is located on an escarpment exposed to the east with medium to steep slopes. The soil, usually till is deep, well-drained soil. The forest is bordered to the northeast by the Chézine river.

The forest is located in zec Batiscan-Neilson.

== Flora ==
The old forest of Rivière-Chézine is a forest mainly dominated by the yellow birch (Betula alleghaniensis). Since it is a species susceptible to water stress, oblique drainage probably favored its growth. The average age of the trees is around 160 years (5,000 Ms), but the dominant trees are over 185 years (5,800 Ms) and something like 60 centimetres (24 in) of diameter. A yellow birch even exceeds 300 years (9,500 Ms) and has a trunk of 92 centimetres (36 in) in diameter. The forest also has many characteristics of old-growth forest, such as an irregular structure, woody debris on the ground, chicot s and trees with imposing diameters.

The shrub layer, we especially observe the maple with ears of corn (Acer spicatum ), which is accompanied by the viburnum antlers (Viburnum lantanoides) elderberry (Sambucus racemosa), Balsam fir (Abies balsamea) and gadellier lacustre (Ribes lacustre). The herbaceous layer is occupied by ferns of the genus Dryopteris sp., The beech beetle (Phegopteris connectilis), the mountain oxalid (Oxalis montana) and pubescent bramble (Rubus pubescens).

== Appendices ==
=== Related articles ===
- Chézine River (Sainte-Anne River)
- Zec Batiscan-Neilson

=== Bibliography ===
- Ministry of Natural Resources and Wildlife (2007). Forêt Forêt de la Rivière-Chézine (PDF)..
