= Honorine Lake =

- Location in Quebec
- Location: Lac-Jacques-Cartier (TNO), La Côte-de-Beaupré Regional County Municipality, Capitale-Nationale, Quebec, Canada
- Coordinates: 47.69167°N 71.332221°W
- Lake type: Natural
- Primary inflows: (clockwise from the mouth) Ruisseaux riverains et décharge des lacs Bert et Mongeau
- Primary outflows: Launière River
- Basin countries: Canada
- Max. length: 2.8 km (1.7 mi)
- Max. width: 0.7 km (0.43 mi)
- Surface elevation: 844 m (2,769 ft)

The lac Honorine is a freshwater body on the hydrographic side of the Launière River, of the Jacques-Cartier River, in the unorganized territory of Lac-Jacques-Cartier, in the La Côte-de-Beaupré Regional County Municipality, in the administrative region of Capitale-Nationale, in the province, in Quebec, Canada.

The area around the lake is indirectly served by the route 175 which passes on the east side. A few secondary forest roads serve this area for forestry and recreational tourism purposes.

Forestry is the main economic activity in the sector; recreational tourism, second.

The surface of Lake Honorine is usually frozen from the beginning of December to the end of March, however the safe circulation on the ice is generally made from mid-December to mid-March.

== Geography ==
The main hydrographic slopes near Lake Honorine are:

- north side: Rivière aux Écorces North-East, Hell stream, Pies stream, Noir stream, Pikauba River;
- east side: Hell stream, Pikauba River, Jacques-Cartier Lake, Jacques-Cartier River;
- south side: Launière River, Launière lake, Frazie lake, Cavée River, Jacques-Cartier North-West River;
- west side: Franchère Lake, Gravel brook, Dei brook, Rivière aux Écorces North-East, Kane brook.

Lake Honorine has a length of 2.8 kilometres (1.7 mi), a width of 0.7 kilometres (0.43 mi) and an altitude of 844 metres (2,769 ft). This lake is mainly fed by riparian streams, by the outlet (coming from the northeast) from lakes Berth and Mongeau and by a stream (coming from the southeast). This lake is surrounded by mountains on the east and south sides, whose peaks reach 960 metres (3,150 ft) to the northeast and 1,001 metres (3,284 ft) to the southwest. The dike at the mouth of Lake Honorine is located to the northwest, at:

- south-east of the confluence of the outlet of Lake Honorine and the Rivière aux Écorces North-East;
- 3.3 kilometres (2.1 mi) south-east of Jacqueline Lake (Rivière aux Écorces North-East);
- 6.5 kilometres (4.0 mi) south-west of the Pikauba River;
- 7.0 kilometres (4.3 mi) north-west of the dam at the mouth of Lake Rieutard which is the head lake of the Clavée River;
- 7.9 kilometres (4.9 mi) east of Franchère Lake;
- 9.6 kilometres (6.0 mi) west of route 175;
- 11.4 kilometres (7.1 mi) north-west of Jacques-Cartier Lake;
- 33.8 kilometres (21.0 mi) north of the confluence of the Launière River and the Jacques-Cartier River.

From the mouth of Lake Honorine, the current follows the course of the Launière River consecutively over generally south, the course of the Jacques-Cartier River on generally towards the south where it merges with the Saint Lawrence River.

== Toponymy ==
The term "Honorine" is a first name of French origin.

The toponym Lac Honorine was formalized on December 5, 1968, by the Commission de toponymie du Québec.

=== Related articles ===
- La Côte-de-Beaupré Regional County Municipality
- Lac-Jacques-Cartier, a TNO
- Launière River
- Jacques-Cartier River
- St. Lawrence River
- List of lakes of Canada
