= Chézine River =

River in Quebec, Canada

Chézine North Rivière Chézine
- Location within Quebec

Location
- Country: Canada
- Province: Quebec
- Region: Capitale-Nationale
- Regional County Municipality: La Jacques-Cartier
- Unorganized territory and municipality: Lac-Croche and Saint-Gabriel-de-Valcartier

Physical characteristics
- Source: Corbin Lake
  - location: Lac-Croche
  - coordinates: 47.21938°N 71.68272°W
  - elevation: 677 m (2,221 ft)
- Mouth: Sainte-Anne River
  - location: Saint-Gabriel-de-Valcartier
  - coordinates: 47.10222°N 71.6425°W
  - elevation: 260 m (850 ft)
- Length: 17.3 km (10.7 mi)

Basin features
- Tributaries
  - left: (Upward from the mouth) Ruisseau non identifié, Chézine North River, ruisseau non identifié, décharge d'un lac non identifié, ruisseau non identifié, décharge d'un lac non identifié.
  - right: (Upward from the mouth) Décharge du Lac Lelièvre, décharge d'un lac non identifié, décharge d'un lac non identifié.

The Rivière Chézine (English: Chézine River) is a tributary of the Sainte-Anne River flowing in the unorganized territory of Lac-Croche and the municipality of Saint-Gabriel-de-Valcartier, in the La Jacques-Cartier Regional County Municipality, in the administrative region of Capitale-Nationale, in Quebec, in Canada.

The lower part of the Chézine river is mainly served by the forest road R0354 (north–south direction) for the needs of forestry and recreational tourism activities. The upper part is served by the forest road R0300 (north–south direction) which passes on the east side of Chézine Lake. While the intermediate part has no access road because of the high cliffs on each side of the river.

The main economic activities in the sector are forestry and recreational tourism activities.

The surface of the Chézine River (except the rapids areas) is generally frozen from the beginning of December to the end of March, but the safe circulation on the ice is generally made from the end of December to the beginning of March. The water level of the river varies with the seasons and the precipitation; the spring flood occurs in March or April.

== Geography ==
The Chézine River rises at the mouth of Chézine Lake (length: 1.7 kilometres (1.1 mi); altitude 677 metres (2,221 ft)) in the unorganized territory of Lac-Croche. This lake between the mountains is fed by only two mountain streams. A mountain peak culminates at 802 metres (2,631 ft) at 0.9 kilometres (0.56 mi) north of the lake. The mouth of Lake Chézine is located 13.9 kilometres (8.6 mi) west of the course of the Jacques-Cartier River, 27.3 kilometres (17.0 mi) north of the center of village of Saint-Raymond and 74.6 kilometres (46.4 mi) north of the confluence of the Sainte-Anne river with the St. Lawrence River.

From the mouth of Lake Chézine, the Chézine river flows over 17.3 kilometres (10.7 mi) entirely in the forest zone with a drop of 417 metres (1,368 ft), according to the following segments:

- 3.7 kilometres (2.3 mi) towards the south by crossing two small lakes, until the discharge (coming from the northwest) of an unidentified lake;
- 1.8 kilometres (1.1 mi) towards the south by forking towards the south-east to the outlet (coming from the west) of an unidentified lake;
- 3.5 kilometres (2.2 mi) towards the south-east in a deep valley, collecting a stream (coming from the north) to the outlet (coming from the south) of Lac Lelièvre;
- 2.2 kilometres (1.4 mi) towards the south-east in a well-steep valley until the confluence of the Chézine North River (coming from the north);
- 6.1 kilometres (3.8 mi) to the south in a well-boxed valley, gradually bending towards the south-east until its mouth.

The Chézine river flows on the west bank of the Sainte-Anne river. This confluence is located 14.1 kilometres (8.8 mi) west of the course of the Jacques-Cartier river, 27.4 kilometres (17.0 mi) north of the center of the village of Saint-Raymond and 74.6 kilometres (46.4 mi) north of the confluence of the Sainte-Anne river with the Saint-Laurent river.

From this confluence, the current descends on 115.8 kilometres (72.0 mi) generally south and southwest following the course of the Sainte-Anne river, to the northwest bank of the Saint Lawrence river.

The river flows entirely in the zec Batiscan-Neilson.

== Toponymy ==
The Chézine is a river of the Loire-Atlantique, in France, which flows into the Loire in Nantes.

The toponym "Chézine river" was formalized on December 5, 1968, at the Place Names Bank of the Commission de toponymie du Québec.

== See also ==
- Laurentides Wildlife Reserve
- Forêt ancienne de la Rivière-Chézine (English: Rivière-Chézine old forest)
- Zec Batiscan-Neilson
- La Jacques-Cartier Regional County Municipality
- Lac-Croche, an unorganized territory
- Saint-Gabriel-de-Valcartier, a municipality
- Sainte-Anne River (Mauricie)
- Chézine North River
- Chézine Lake
- List of rivers of Quebec

== Bibliography ==
- CAPSA (2014). Plans directeurs de l'eau des secteurs d'intervention de la zone de gestion de la CAPSA: Sainte-Anne, Portneuf et La Chevrotière (English: Water master plans of the intervention sectors of the CAPSA management area: Sainte-Anne, Portneuf and La Chevrotière) (PDF) (in French). Quebec: CAPSA. p. 691. Archived from the original (PDF) on 2019-02-14.
