= Rivière Jacques-Cartier Nord-Ouest =

- Location within Quebec

Location
- Country: Canada
- Province: Quebec
- Region: Capitale-Nationale
- Regional County Municipality: La Côte-de-Beaupré Regional County Municipality
- Unorganized territory: Lac-Jacques-Cartier

Physical characteristics
- Source: Brassoit Lake
  - location: Lac-Jacques-Cartier
  - coordinates: 47.61285°N 71.57617°W
  - elevation: 781 m (2,562 ft)
- Mouth: Jacques-Cartier River
  - location: Lac-Jacques-Cartier
  - coordinates: 47.48417°N 71.41°W
  - elevation: 340 m (1,120 ft)
- Length: 41.5 km (25.8 mi)
- Discharge
  - location: Lac-Jacques-Cartier

Basin features
- Tributaries
  - left: (Upward from the mouth) Ruisseau non identifié, ruisseau non identifié, ruisseau non identifié, décharge du Lac de l'Ange (via le Lac Charles-Savary), décharge des lacs du Cardinal, Anne et Bolo, décharge du lac Keler (via le Lac Achille), Cavée River, décharge du lac Cerné, décharge du lac Lucille (via le lac Boyd), décharge du lac Pauline (via le lac Boyd).
  - right: (Upward from the mouth) Décharge de l'Étang Ledoux, décharge de l'Étang Laura, décharge du Rivière Jacques-Cartier Sud, décharge du lac Henri-Mercier, décharge du lac Maguire, décharge des lacs Aigrette et Barbara, décharge du lac Jobin, décharge du lac Beaulieu, décharge du lac Si, décharge du lac Do et Ré, décharge des lacs de la Fraicheur, Judas et Gaston.

The Jacques-Cartier North-West River is a watercourse tributary of Jacques-Cartier River, located in the unorganized territory of Lac-Jacques-Cartier, in the La Côte-de-Beaupré Regional County Municipality, in the administrative region of Capitale-Nationale, in Quebec, Canada. The course of the river passes in particular in the Jacques-Cartier National Park. The main body of water is Petit lac Jacques-Cartier.

Forestry is the main economic activity in the sector; recreational tourism, second.

The surface of the Jacques-Cartier Nord-Ouest river (except the rapids) is generally frozen from the beginning of December to the end of March, but the safe circulation on the ice is generally made from the end of December to the beginning of March.

== Geography ==
The main watersheds adjacent to the Jacques-Cartier Northeast River are:

- north side: Cavée River, Rivière aux Écorces du Milieu, Métabetchouane East River;
- east side: Jacques-Cartier River, Launière River;
- south side: Cook River, Jacques-Cartier River, Petit lac Jacques-Cartier;
- west side: Batiscan Lake, rivière à Moïse.

The Jacques-Cartier Nord-Ouest river draws its source at Brassoit Lake (length: 1.0 kilometre (0.62 mi); altitude: 781 metres (2,562 ft), located in the unorganized territory of Lac-Jacques-Cartier, in the La Côte-de-Beaupré Regional County Municipality. This lake receives water on the east side of the Petit outlet Lake Brassoit.

From the mouth of Lac Brassoit, the Jacques-Cartier Nord-Ouest river flows over 41.5 kilometres (25.8 mi), with a total drop of 441 metres (1,447 ft), according to the following segments:

Upper course of the Jacques-Cartier North-West river (segment of 17.6 kilometres (10.9 mi))

- 3.4 kilometres (2.1 mi) towards the west by forming a curve towards the south to circumvent a mountain, then another curve towards the north to circumvent another mountain, to the north shore of Chapleau Lakes;
- 1.3 kilometres (0.81 mi) to the south by crossing Chapleau lakes;
- 2.4 kilometres (1.5 mi) first towards the south-west, then towards the south-east, crossing a first body of water on 0.6 kilometres (0.37 mi), then Lake Garant ( altitude: 699 metres (2,293 ft)) over 1.5 kilometres (0.93 mi), i.e. its full length, up to its mouth;
- 3.5 kilometres (2.2 mi) towards the south-west crossing Lake Sol and Lake La (altitude: 697 metres (2,287 ft)) over their full length, up to the mouth of this latest. Note: Seven lakes in this zone are designated according to the musical range: C, D, E, F, G, A, Si;
- 4.4 kilometres (2.7 mi) south-east by subsequently crossing a series of rapids, Lac Obéron, Lac Titania, Lac du Songe, Lac Boyd (length: 1.8 kilometres (1.1 mi) resembling a misshapen crescent open to the south; altitude: 681 metres (2,234 ft)), to the mouth of the latter;
- 2.6 kilometres (1.6 mi) towards the south-east, in particular by successively crossing Lake Viner, Lake James and Lake Verreault, to the mouth of the latter, located opposite the confluence of the Cavée River (coming from the north) on the other side of the island of 0.8 kilometres (0.50 mi) which the Jacques-Cartier North-West river bypasses;

Intermediate course of the Jacques-Cartier North-West river (segment of 12.2 kilometres (7.6 mi))

- 2.7 kilometres (1.7 mi) south across Lake Achilles (altitude: 673 metres (2,208 ft)) to its mouth;
- 3.5 kilometres (2.2 mi) to the south by crossing five series of rapids, collecting the discharge (coming from the east) of the Bolo and Cardinal lakes, as well as the discharge (coming from the west) of lakes Barbara and Aigrette, then branching south-west at the end of the segment, to the outlet (coming from the west) of Lake Maguire;
- 6.0 kilometres (3.7 mi) towards the south-east in particular by crossing Lake Charles-Savary (length: 2.5 kilometres (1.6 mi) either to the dam; altitude: 651 metres (2,136 ft)) up to the outlet of the rivière Jacques-Cartier Sud (coming from the south) and which turns out to be the outlet of Petit lac Jacques-Cartier;

Lower course of the Jacques-Cartier North-West river (segment of 11.7 kilometres (7.3 mi))

- 8.6 kilometres (5.3 mi) towards the northeast, then the southeast, in a deep valley crossing nine series of rapids, up to a bend in the river;
- 3.1 kilometres (1.9 mi) north-east in a steep valley, then south following the foot of the mountain, to its mouth. Note: In this last segment, the course of the river passes at the foot of the "Paroi de la Cascade" which rises 379 metres (1,243 ft) above the water;.

From the confluence of the Jacques-Cartier North-West river, the current flows for 60.2 kilometres (37.4 mi) towards the south by the course of the Jacques-Cartier River to the north shore. is from Saint Lawrence River.

== Toponymy ==
This toponym appears on a regional map of 1943, evoking the memory of Jacques Cartier (1491-1557), navigator and explorer born in Saint-Malo in France. Cartier made three trips to Canada between 1534 and 1541. Verrazzano's probable companion in South America, in 1524 and 1528, Cartier ventured to the New World in 1534, commissioned by François I to find gold and a passage to Asia. During this first trip, he did not go beyond Anticosti Island, explored Chaleur Bay and the Gulf of St. Lawrence. During his second trip in 1535, during which he went to Hochelaga (Montreal), he wintered in Stadaconé (Quebec). On August 15, after leaving the western tip of Anticosti Island, he became aware of land that remained "towards the south which is a land of marvelous mountain hault", these high lands being those that plunge into the sea around the Saint-Louis and Saint-Pierre mountains.

In 1541, Cartier, under the orders of Jean-François de La Rocque de Roberval, established the first French colony in America. He settled on the left bank, at the mouth of the Cap Rouge river, where he built two forts communicating with each other, one at the bottom of the promontory, the other above. He went a second time to Hochelaga, then returned to Cap-Rouge where he spent the winter. Jacques Cartier left the colony in early June 1542, while Roberval had been on his way to Canada since the middle of April. The two meet in Newfoundland in mid-June. Invited by Roberval to follow him to Cap-Rouge, Cartier abandoned him and left Newfoundland during the night of June 18 to 19. Cartier arrives in Saint-Malo in early September. Cartier must then recognize that its gold found in Canada is iron pyrite and its diamonds, quartz or mica.

The toponym "Rivière Jacques-Cartier Nord-Ouest" was formalized on December 5, 1968, at the Place Names Bank of the Commission de toponymie du Québec.

== See also ==
- Jacques-Cartier National Park
- Lac-Jacques-Cartier, a TNO
- La Côte-de-Beaupré Regional County Municipality
- Capitale-Nationale, an administrative region
- Cavée River
- Rivière Jacques-Cartier Sud
- Jacques-Cartier River
- Petit lac Jacques-Cartier
- List of rivers of Quebec

=== External links ===
- Corporation du bassin de la Jacques-Cartier
- Parc de la Jacques-Cartier
- Canadian Heritage Rivers System
