= Tourilli Lake =

Lake in Lac-Croche, Quebec, Canada

- Location in Quebec
- Location: Lac-Croche (TNO), La Jacques-Cartier Regional County Municipality (MRC), Capitale-Nationale
- Coordinates: 47.355°N 71.65278°W
- Lake type: Natural
- Primary inflows: (Clockwise from the mouth) Discharge (coming from the south) from Lake Vermuy, discharge (coming from the northwest) from Lake Josselin.
- Primary outflows: Tourilli River
- Basin countries: Canada
- Max. length: 3.2 km (2.0 mi)
- Max. width: 1.9 km (1.2 mi)
- Surface elevation: 665 m (2,182 ft)
- Islands: 3

The lake Tourilli is a freshwater body at the head of the Tourilli River, flowing in the Laurentides Wildlife Reserve. This lake is located entirely in the unorganized territory of Lac-Croche, in the La Jacques-Cartier Regional County Municipality, administrative region of the Capitale-Nationale, in province of Quebec, in Canada.

The Lac Tourilli watershed is served by a few secondary forest roads for the purposes of forestry and recreational tourism activities.

Forestry is the main economic activity in the sector; recreational tourism, second.

The surface of Lac Tourilli is generally frozen from the beginning of December to the end of March; safe circulation on the ice is generally done from the end of December to the beginning of March.

== Geography ==
Lac Tourilli has a length of 3.2 kilometres (2.0 mi), a width of 1.9 kilometres (1.2 mi) and its surface is at an altitude of 665 metres (2,182 ft). This lake deep between the mountains is like a large misshapen X. It has four large bays:

- the first stretches over 0.5 kilometres (0.31 mi) to the south and receives the discharge (coming from the south) from Lake Vermuy;
- the second on 0.9 kilometres (0.56 mi) to the west and receives the discharge (coming from the northwest) from Lac Josselin;
- the third on 0.6 kilometres (0.37 mi) towards the north;
- the fourth in the form of growth comprising seven islands stretches over 2.4 kilometres (1.5 mi) towards the mouth of the lake.

The mouth of Lac Tourilli is located 2.7 kilometres (1.7 mi) southwest of Gregory Lake, 13.6 kilometres (8.5 mi) west of the course of Jacques-Cartier River and 32.6 kilometres (20.3 mi) north of the confluence of the Tourilli River and the Sainte-Anne River.

From the mouth of Lac Tourilli, the current descends on 56.3 kilometres (35.0 mi) first to the north, then generally to the south, following the course of the Tourilli river until its confluence with the Sainte-Anne River; thence, the current generally flows south by borrowing the current from the Sainte-Anne river to the northeast bank of the Saint-Laurent river.

== Toponymy ==
The toponym "Lac Tourilli" is directly linked to the river of the same name.

The toponym "Lac Tourilli" was formalized on December 5, 1968, by the Commission de toponymie du Québec.

== See also ==
- Laurentides Wildlife Reserve
- Lac-Croche, an unorganized territory
- Gregory Lake
- Tourilli River
- Rivière Sainte-Anne
- List of lakes of Canada
