= Launière Lake =

Freshwater lake in the province of Quebec, Canada

- Location in Quebec
- Location: Lac-Jacques-Cartier (TNO), La Côte-de-Beaupré Regional County Municipality, Capitale-Nationale, Quebec, Canada
- Coordinates: 47.65778°N 71.38083°W
- Lake type: Natural
- Primary inflows: (clockwise from the mouth) Décharge du lac Frazie, Launière River, décharge du Lac La Giroflée et du Lac des Quatre Collines.
- Primary outflows: Launière River
- Basin countries: Canada
- Max. length: 2.2 km (1.4 mi)
- Max. width: 0.5 km (0.31 mi)
- Surface elevation: 808 m (2,651 ft)

The Launière Lake is a freshwater body crossed by the Launière River in the unorganized territory of Lac-Jacques-Cartier, in the La Côte-de-Beaupré Regional County Municipality, in the administrative region of Capitale-Nationale, in the province of Quebec, in Canada. This body of water is located in the Laurentides Wildlife Reserve.

The area around the lake is indirectly served by the route 175 which passes at 9.7 kilometres (6.0 mi) on the east side and runs along the west shore of Jacques-Cartier Lake. A few secondary forest roads serve this area for forestry and recreational tourism activities.

Forestry is the main economic activity in the sector; recreational tourism, second.

The surface of Lac Launière is usually frozen from the beginning of December to the end of March, however the safe circulation on the ice is generally made from mid-December to mid-March.

== Geography ==
Lac Launière has a length of 2.2 kilometres (1.4 mi), a width of 0.5 kilometres (0.31 mi) and its surface is at an altitude of 808 metres (2,651 ft). This lake sunk between the mountains is made in length by more or less marrying the shape of the letter L.

Lac Launière receives the discharge from Lac La Giroflée on the east side and the discharge from Lac Frazie on the west side.

From the mouth of Lac Launière, the current descends on 26.9 kilometres (16.7 mi) following the course of the Launière River. Then the current follows the course of the Jacques-Cartier River for generally south to the northeast bank of the St. Lawrence River.

== Toponymy ==
According to Isaïe Nantais, this toponym recalls a family of gamekeepers who lived for many years at the lake at Christmas, that is, 47.6 kilometres (29.6 mi) southeast of the mouth of Lac Launière. Thomas-Edmond Giroux reports Michel Launier, of Innu origin, had his hunting territory there. It is designated on the map of Commissioner Flynn, of the Crown Lands department, in 1896, in the form "Lac à Launier". The first mention in the form "Lac Launière" was noted on a map in 1915.

The toponym Lac Launière was formalized on December 5, 1968, by the Commission de toponymie du Québec.

== See also ==
- St. Lawrence River
- List of lakes of Canada
