= Cavée River =

Canadian river and tributary

- Location within Quebec

Location
- Country: Canada
- Province: Quebec
- Region: Capitale-Nationale
- Regional County Municipality: La Côte-de-Beaupré Regional County Municipality
- Unorganized territory: Lac-Jacques-Cartier

Physical characteristics
- Source: Rieutard Lake
  - location: Lac-Jacques-Cartier
  - coordinates: 47.69819°N 71.43361°W
  - elevation: 808 m (2,651 ft)
- Mouth: Rivière Jacques-Cartier Nord-Ouest
  - location: Lac-Jacques-Cartier
  - coordinates: 47.48417°N 71.52333°W
  - elevation: 673 m (2,208 ft)
- Length: 30.3 km (18.8 mi)
- Discharge
  - location: Lac-Jacques-Cartier

Basin features
- Tributaries
  - left: (Upward from the mouth) Décharge du Lac de Céraistes, décharge des lacs de la Ciseray et McDuff, décharge (via le lac Bakys) des lacs Pinzière et Marthe, décharge (via le lac Chagnon) du lac Julien, décharge (via le lac Lavigne) d'un lac non identifié, ruisseau non identifié, décharge (via le lac Rieutard) d'un ensemble de lacs (Dan, Joug, Hardy, de la Rocaille, Mérillon et Dugas).
  - right: (Upward from the mouth) Décharge des lacs Bill et Léo, décharge (via le lac Chagnon) des lacs Léon et Chaboyé, décharge (via le lac Dahous) des lac Papin et Petit lac Papin, décharge (via le lac Lavigne) du lac Nérée, décharge des lacs Gerbec, Ianus, Intermédiaire, Debous et Jas.

The Cavée River is a freshwater tributary of the Rivière Jacques-Cartier Nord-Ouest that flows in the unorganized territory of Lac-Jacques-Cartier. It flows through the La Côte-de-Beaupré Regional County Municipality in the administrative region of Capitale-Nationale, in Quebec, Canada. The course of the river crosses the Jacques-Cartier National Park.

Forestry is the main economic activity in the sector, followed by recreational tourism.

The surface of the Cavée River (except the rapids zones) is generally frozen from the beginning of December to the end of March, but the safe circulation on the ice is generally made from the end of December to the beginning of March.

== Geography ==
The main watersheds near the Cavée river are:

- north side: Gratia stream, Rivière aux Écorces du Milieu, Métabetchouane East River;
- east side: Jacques-Cartier River, Launière River;
- south side: Rivière Jacques-Cartier Nord-Ouest, Petit lac Jacques-Cartier;
- west side: Métabetchouane East River, Métabetchouane River.

The Cavée river has its source at Rieutard Lake (length: 1.1 kilometres (0.68 mi); altitude: 808 metres (2,651 ft), located in the unorganized territory of Lac-Jacques-Cartier, in the La Côte-de-Beaupré Regional County Municipality This lake receives water from the eastern side of the discharge of a set of lakes (Mérillon, Dugas, de la Rocaille, Hardy, Joug and Dan).

From the mouth of Rieutard Lake, the Cavée River flows over 30.3 kilometres (18.8 mi), with a total drop of 135 metres (443 ft), according to the following segments:

Upper course of the Cavée river (segment of 17.7 kilometres (11.0 mi))

- 4.4 kilometres (2.7 mi) south in a steep valley, to the north shore of Lac Lavigne;
- 3.1 kilometres (1.9 mi) southwards crossing Lavigne lake (length: 2.0 kilometres (1.2 mi); altitude: 767 metres (2,516 ft)) and Dahous lake (length: 1.4 kilometres (0.87 mi)), up to the dam at its mouth. Note: Lac Lavigne receives the discharge (coming from the west) from lakes Gerbec, Ianus, Intermediate, Debous and Jax); it receives from the east the discharge of lakes Millet, from above, Augustin and Nickie; it also receives from the southwest the outlet of Lake Nere;
- 1.9 kilometres (1.2 mi) to the south, crossing Lac Soucy (altitude: 756 metres (2,480 ft)) on 0.9 kilometres (0.56 mi), to the dam at its mouth;
- 8.3 kilometres (5.2 mi) south across Chagnon Lake (altitude: 744 metres (2,441 ft)) on 1.0 kilometre (0.62 mi), to its mouth;

Lower course of the Cavée river (segment of 12.6 kilometres (7.8 mi))

- 2.3 kilometres (1.4 mi) south across Lake Bakys (altitude: 739 metres (2,425 ft)) on 1.8 kilometres (1.1 mi), to the dam at its mouth;
- 2.7 kilometres (1.7 mi) to the south, up to a bend in the river;
- 4.7 kilometres (2.9 mi) towards the south by forming a loop towards the east, up to the outlet (coming from the west) of lakes Léo, Petit lac Léo and Bill;
- 2.9 kilometres (1.8 mi) south to its mouth.

From the confluence of the Cuvée river, the current follows the course of the Rivière Jacques-Cartier Nord-Ouest on , the course of the Jacques-Cartier River on to the south the northeast bank of the Saint Lawrence River.

== Toponymy ==
The toponym "Rivière Cavée" was formalized on December 5, 1968 at the Place Names Bank of the Commission de toponymie du Québec.

== See also ==
- Jacques-Cartier National Park
- Lac-Jacques-Cartier, a TNO
- La Côte-de-Beaupré Regional County Municipality
- Capitale-Nationale, an administrative region
- Rivière Jacques-Cartier Nord-Ouest
- Jacques-Cartier River
- Rieutard Lake
- List of rivers of Quebec

=== External links ===
- Corporation du bassin de la Jacques-Cartier
- Parc de la Jacques-Cartier
