= Launière River =

- Location within Quebec

Location
- Country: Canada
- Province: Quebec
- Region: Capitale-Nationale
- Regional County Municipality: La Côte-de-Beaupré Regional County Municipality
- Unorganized territory: Lac-Jacques-Cartier

Physical characteristics
- Source: Honorine Lake
  - location: Lac-Jacques-Cartier
  - coordinates: 47.70185°N 71.33902°W
  - elevation: 844 m (2,769 ft)
- Mouth: Jacques-Cartier River
  - location: Lac-Jacques-Cartier
  - coordinates: 47.46555°N 71.40583°W
  - elevation: 550 m (1,800 ft)
- Length: 35.5 km (22.1 mi)
- Discharge
  - location: Lac-Jacques-Cartier

Basin features
- Tributaries
  - left: (Upward from the mouth) Rivière du Milieu, décharge du Lac de la Poule d'Eau, décharge du Lac La Giroflée.
  - right: (Upward from the mouth) Décharge du Lac Moroleau, décharge du lac Dorothy, décharge du Lac Frank, décharge des lacs Éthier et Arnaudeau, décharge du Lac Parfait, décharge du Lac Gigault, décharge du Lac du Busard, décharge des lac Marois, Dubé et Frazie, décharge du lac Rectangle, décharge du Lac Poudrette.

The Launière River is a tributary of the Jacques-Cartier River, flowing in the La Côte-de-Beaupré Regional County Municipality, in the administrative region of the Capitale-Nationale, in the province of Quebec, in Canada.

This watercourse is located in the south center of the Laurentides Wildlife Reserve. This valley is indirectly accessible by the Antonio-Talbot road. Secondary forest roads serve the sector for forestry and recreational tourism activities.

The surface of the Launière River (except the rapids zones) is usually frozen from the end of November to the beginning of April, however the safe circulation on the ice is generally done from mid-December to the end of March.

== Geography ==
The main watersheds neighboring the Launière river are:

- north side: ruisseau de l'Enfer, Rivière aux Écorces North-East, Chicoutimi River;
- east side: Jacques-Cartier River, Jacques-Cartier Lake, rivière du Milieu;
- south side: Jacques-Cartier River, Rocheuse River;
- west side: lac Champlain, Cavée River, le rivière aux Écorces.

The Launière River rises at the mouth of Honorine Lake (length: 2.7 kilometres (1.7 mi); altitude: 844 metres (2,769 ft)). This lake is surrounded by mountains whose summit culminates in 1,001 metres (3,284 ft) southwest. This lake is mainly fed by the outlet (coming from the northeast) of lakes Bert and Mongeau, as well as an unidentified stream (coming from the southeast). A dam was built at its mouth which is located northwest of the lake, at:

- 6.5 kilometres (4.0 mi) southwest of the course of the Chicoutimi River;
- 2.6 kilometres (1.6 mi) south of Lac Vézina which is the head lake of the Rivière aux Écorces North-East;
- 9.5 kilometres (5.9 mi) west of the route 175;
- 11.7 kilometres (7.3 mi) north-east of Jacques-Cartier Lake;
- 26.7 kilometres (16.6 mi) north of its mouth (confluence with the Jacques-Cartier River).

From its source, the course of the Launière river descends over 35.5 kilometres (22.1 mi), with a drop of 294 metres (965 ft), according to the following segments:

Upper course of the Launière river (from its source) (segment of 8.6 kilometres (5.3 mi))

- 1.3 kilometres (0.81 mi) west passing between two mountains, up to the west shore of Lac Jeanne;
- 5.1 kilometres (3.2 mi) to the south, successively crossing Lake Jeanne over 0.3 kilometres (0.19 mi), Lake Levitt over 0.5 kilometres (0.31 mi), Lake Castonguay over 0.9 kilometres (0.56 mi) over its full length, Lac du Grand Chien on 17 kilometres (11 mi) over its full length up to the dam at the mouth of the latter. Note: a forest road passes over this dam;
- 2.2 kilometres (1.4 mi) first to the south, then to the east, crossing Lac Launière (altitude: 808 metres (2,651 ft)) over its full length, to its mouth. Note: Lac Launière receives on the east side the outlet of Lac La Giroflée and on the west side the outlet of Lake Frazie;

Intermediate course of the Launière river (segment of 17.7 kilometres (11.0 mi))

- 2.7 kilometres (1.7 mi) to the south, in particular by crossing Lac du Renflement (altitude: 809 metres (2,654 ft)) over its full length, to the dam at its mouth;
- 3.5 kilometres (2.2 mi) to the south in a deep valley, in particular crossing Lac Étincelant (altitude: 803 metres (2,635 ft)) over 0.9 kilometres (0.56 mi), i.e. over its full length, to its mouth;
- 2.1 kilometres (1.3 mi) to the south, crossing two series of rapids, up to a bend in the river, corresponding to the outlet (coming from the west) of Lac du Huard;
- 2.5 kilometres (1.6 mi) south-east, in particular by crossing Lac des Sentinelles (altitude: 789 metres (2,589 ft)) for 0.4 kilometres (0.25 mi), to a stream (coming from the east);
- 6.0 kilometres (3.7 mi) south in a deep valley, crossing a few series of rapids at the end of the segment, to a stream (from the west);

Lower Launière River (9.2 kilometres (5.7 mi) segment)

Lower course of the Launière river (segment of 9.2 kilometres (5.7 mi))

- 5.0 kilometres (3.1 mi) south crossing several series of rapids and passing under the forest road bridge to the outlet (coming from the west) of Frank Lake;
- 1.8 kilometres (1.1 mi) to the southeast by collecting the outlet (coming from the west) from Lac Dorothy, to the confluence of the Rivière du Milieu (Rivière Launière);
- 2.4 kilometres (1.5 mi) towards the south-east in a deep valley and forming a small curve towards the north-east to go around a mountain, to its mouth.

The current of the Launière river flows on the north bank of the Jacques-Cartier River, in a bend of the river. From there, the current descends the Jacques-Cartier River on 60.7 kilometres (37.7 mi), to the Saint Lawrence River.

== Toponymy ==
The toponym "Lac Launière" appears on a map of the Laurentides National Park (1954). The origin of this acronym is probably attributed in memory of a family of gamekeepers who lived in the lake at Christmas, 45 kilometres (28 mi) south of L'Étape.

The toponym "Rivière Launière" was formalized on December 5, 1968, at the Place Names Bank of the Commission de toponymie du Québec.

== See also ==
- Launière Lake, a body of water
- List of rivers of Quebec
