= Petit lac Jacques-Cartier =

Lake in Quebec, Canada

- Location in Quebec
- Location: Lac-Jacques-Cartier (TNO), La Côte-de-Beaupré Regional County Municipality, Capitale-Nationale
- Coordinates: 47.40722°N 71.53°W
- Lake type: Natural
- Primary inflows: (clockwise from the mouth) Décharge des lacs Collins, Poitevin et Mesy, décharge des lacs Haltère et Garneau, décharge du lac Lairet, décharge du lac Doux.
- Primary outflows: Rivière Jacques-Cartier Sud
- Basin countries: Canada
- Max. length: 3.9 km (2.4 mi)
- Max. width: 1.75 km (1.09 mi)
- Surface elevation: 674 m (2,211 ft)

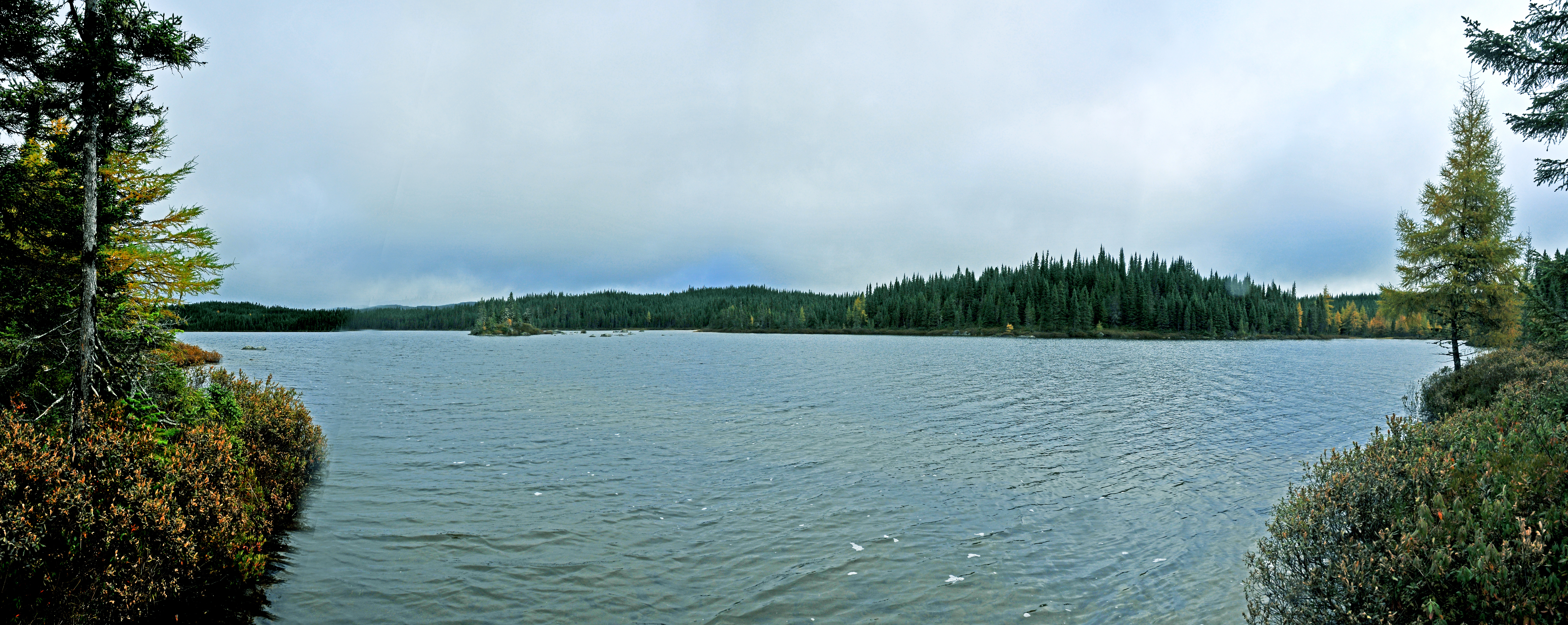
Petit lac Jacques-Cartier. Laurentides Wildlife Reserve, Quebec, Canada

The Petit lac Jacques-Cartier is a freshwater body that flows into the rivière Jacques-Cartier Sud, in the unorganized territory of Lac-Jacques-Cartier, in the La Côte-de-Beaupré Regional County Municipality, in the administrative region of Capitale-Nationale, in province from Quebec, in Canada.

Petit lac Jacques-Cartier is located in the Jacques-Cartier National Park.

This small valley is served by some secondary roads serving this area for the needs of forestry, recreational tourism activities.

Forestry is the main economic activity in the sector; recreational tourism, second.

The surface of Petit Lac Jacques-Cartier is generally frozen from the beginning of December to the end of March, but safe circulation on the ice is generally made from mid-December to mid-March.

== Geography ==
The main watersheds neighboring Petit Lac Jacques-Cartier are:

- north side: rivière Jacques-Cartier Sud, rivière Jacques-Cartier Nord-Ouest, Charles-Savary Lake;
- east side: rivière Jacques-Cartier Nord-Ouest, Jacques-Cartier River, Rocheuse River;
- south side: Gregory Lake, Tourilli River, Sainte-Anne River;
- west side: rivière Jacques-Cartier Nord-Ouest.

Enclosed between the mountains, the Petit lac Jacques-Cartier has a length of 3.9 kilometres (2.4 mi), a width of 1.75 kilometres (1.09 mi) and an altitude of 674 metres (2,211 ft). This lake has two small islands and a central island which is aligned in a north–south direction with two peninsulas. This lake is mainly fed by the outlet of Collins, Poitevin and Mesy lakes, the outlet of Haltère and Garneau lakes, the outlet of Lairet lake and the outlet of Doux lake. Located at the bottom of a small bay to the northeast, the mouth of this lake has a dam. This mouth is located at:

- 2.3 kilometres (1.4 mi) south-west of a curve of the rivière Jacques-Cartier Nord-Ouest;
- 7.2 kilometres (4.5 mi) west of the confluence of the rivière Jacques-Cartier Nord-Ouest and the Jacques-Cartier River;
- 5.0 kilometres (3.1 mi) south-east of the confluence of the rivière Jacques-Cartier Nord-Ouest and the rivière Jacques-Cartier Sud.

From the mouth of Petit lac Jacques-Cartier, the current flows in the following segments:

- towards the north following the course of the rivière Jacques-Cartier Sud;
- 11.7 kilometres (7.3 mi) to the east down the rivière Jacques-Cartier Nord-Ouest;
- towards the south following the current of the Jacques-Cartier River, to the northwest shore of the Saint-Laurent river.

== Toponymy ==
Jacques Cartier (Saint-Malo, France, 1491 - Saint-Malo, 1557), explorer and navigator, made three trips to Canada between 1534 and 1542. He ventured to the New World in 1534, charged by François I with finding and a passage to Asia. He explored the Anticosti Island, the Gulf of St. Lawrence and, on July 24, he erected a cross in the bay of Gaspé as a sign of appropriation of the site. During his second trip, in 1535, Cartier went up the St. Lawrence River to Hochelaga (Montreal) and spent a difficult winter in Stadaconé (Quebec). Finally, in 1541, under the orders of Roberval, Cartier attempted to establish the first French colony in America. It settles at the mouth of the Cap-Rouge river which it names Charlesbourg-Royal. Cartier left the colony in June 1542, while Roberval was on his way to Canada. They meet in Newfoundland, and Cartier chooses to return to Saint-Malo. First cartographer of the St. Lawrence, he recognizes that the gold and diamonds found turn out to be iron pyrite and quartz.

The toponym "Petit lac Jacques-Cartier" was formalized on December 5, 1968, by the Commission de toponymie du Québec.

== See also ==
- Jacques-Cartier National Park
- La Côte-de-Beaupré Regional County Municipality (MRC)
- Lac-Jacques-Cartier, a TNO
- Rivière Jacques-Cartier Sud
- Rivière Jacques-Cartier Nord-Ouest
- Jacques-Cartier River
- List of lakes of Canada
