= Tourilli River =

- Location within Quebec

Location
- Country: Canada
- Province: Quebec
- Region: Capitale-Nationale, Mauricie
- Regional County Municipality: Portneuf Regional County Municipality and Lac-Croche
- Municipalities: Lac-Croche

Physical characteristics
- Source: Lac Tourilli
  - location: Lac-Croche, MRC La Jacques-Cartier Regional County Municipality
  - coordinates: 47°21′13″N 71°38′56″W
  - elevation: 665 m (2,182 ft)
- Mouth: Sainte-Anne River
  - location: Saint-Gabriel-de-Valcartier
  - coordinates: 47°03′24″N 71°40′01″W
  - elevation: 419 m (1,375 ft)
- Length: 56.3 km (35.0 mi)
- Discharge
  - location: Saint-Gabriel-de-Valcartier

Basin features
- Tributaries
  - left: (Upward from the mouth) Unidentified stream, discharge from an unidentified small lake, Martre stream, discharge from two lakes including Lac à la Vase, discharge from a set of small lakes including Lake Mitchell, discharge from a set of lakes (Aubert, Géraud, du Carcajou and two other unidentified lakes), unidentified stream, discharge from two unidentified lakes including Lac Nil, discharge from lakes Jarry, Roch and Gustave, Mesquin, Ralph, des Fées and Danjou, discharge from Lake Gallant and de la Meute, discharge of a set of small lakes, discharge (via lake Gregory) of lakes Godman, du Piedmont, Cheznay, Fruze, Etheleen and Petit lac Etheleen, discharge (via lake Gregory) of lakes Crochetière, Hunau and Doradilles, outlet of Lac des Doradilles.
  - right: (Upward from the mouth) Unidentified stream, discharge from an unidentified lake, discharge from three small unidentified lakes, unidentified stream, unidentified stream, discharge from a set of lakes including Lac Toosey, discharge from an unidentified lake, discharge from an unidentified lake, discharge from Lake Nemo, discharge from Sommet Lake, unidentified stream, discharge from Écho and Forget lakes, discharge from a set of lakes (Ligneris, Panet and Juneau).

The Rivière Tourilli is a tributary of the Sainte-Anne River flowing in the unorganized territory of Lac-Croche and the municipality of Saint-Gabriel-de-Valcartier, in the La Jacques-Cartier Regional County Municipality, in the administrative region of Capitale-Nationale, at Quebec, in Canada. The upper part of this watercourse crosses the southwest part of the Laurentides Wildlife Reserve.

The lower part of the Tourilli river is mainly served by the forest road R0354 (north–south direction) for the needs of forestry and recreational tourism activities. The upper part is served by the forest road R0355 and the R300.

Forestry is the main economic activity in the sector; recreotourism activities, second.

The surface of the Tourilli River (except the rapids zones) is generally frozen from the beginning of December to the end of March, but the safe circulation on the ice is generally made from the end of December to the beginning of March. The water level of the river varies with the seasons and the precipitation; the spring flood occurs in March or April.

== Geography ==
The Tourilli River rises at the mouth of Tourilli Lake (length: 3.2 kilometres (2.0 mi); altitude 665 metres (2,182 ft)) in the unorganized territory of Lac-Croche. This lake between the mountains is fed by the outlet of Lake Vermuy, Lake Josselin and small mountain streams. A mountain peak culminates at 691 metres (2,267 ft) south of the lake and another at 691 kilometres (429 mi) to the southwest. The mouth of Lac Tourilli is located 9.4 kilometres (5.8 mi) southwest of Petit lac Jacques-Cartier, 13.7 kilometres (8.5 mi) west of the course of the Jacques-Cartier River, at 32.6 kilometres (20.3 mi) north of the confluence of the Tourilli and Sainte-Anne rivers, at 47.6 kilometres (29.6 mi) north-west of the village center of Saint-Gabriel-de-Valcartier and 98.8 kilometres (61.4 mi) north of the confluence of the Sainte-Anne River with the St. Lawrence River.

From the mouth of Lac Tourilli, the Tourilli river flows over 56.3 kilometres (35.0 mi) entirely in the forest zone with a drop of 246 metres (807 ft), according to the following segments:

Upper course of the river (segment of 10.6 kilometres (6.6 mi))

- 1.3 kilometres (0.81 mi) east, then north, in particular by crossing Lake Martel (length: 1.4 kilometres (0.87 mi); altitude: 663 metres (2,175 ft)), to its mouth;
- 2.3 kilometres (1.4 mi) north-west, branching north, then east, in particular crossing Lac Trigone (length: 0.4 kilometres (0.25 mi); altitude: 648 metres (2,126 ft)), to its mouth;
- 0.7 kilometres (0.43 mi) to the east, in particular by crossing Lac des Laiches (length: 0.5 kilometres (0.31 mi); altitude: 640 metres (2,100 ft)), up to at its mouth. Note: Lac des Laiches receives on the north side the discharge of a set of lakes (Inerte, Plissé, Hudon and Petit lac Hudon);
- 4.0 kilometres (2.5 mi) to the east, by forming a hook towards the south to pick up the outlet (coming from the west) of Juneau Lake, before crossing Gregory Lake (length: 2.3 kilometres (1.4 mi); altitude: 634 metres (2,080 ft)), to its mouth. Note: Lac Gregory receives on the north side the outlet of Lac des Doradilles, the outlet of a set of lakes including Hunau, Crochetière and Pleurotes, as well as the outlet of lakes Fruze, Chesnay, Godman, Etheleen, Petit lac Etheleen and Piedmont;

Intermediate river course (segment of 25.4 kilometres (15.8 mi))

- 5.1 kilometres (3.2 mi) towards the south-east by first cutting the forest road R0300 which passes in the east–west direction on an istme with a length of 1.4 kilometres (0.87 mi) before to cross a small lake (length: 0.7 kilometres (0.43 mi); altitude: 726 metres (2,382 ft)), forming a hook towards the southwest, then towards the southeast, until at the outlet (coming from the west) of lakes Écho and Forget;
- 3.7 kilometres (2.3 mi) towards the south-east in a deep valley until the discharge (coming from the north) of the Gallant and Meute lakes;
- 2.3 kilometres (1.4 mi) by first forming a hook towards the east, then towards the south-east in a deep valley, in particular by crossing the Deep lake (length: 0.9 kilometres (0.56 mi); altitude: 702 metres (2,303 ft)) over its full length, to its mouth;
- 2.3 kilometres (1.4 mi) towards the south-east in a well-boxed valley until the confluence of the Chézine North River (coming from the north);
- 12.0 kilometres (7.5 mi) first on 5.8 kilometres (3.6 mi) towards the south-east, then towards the south relatively in a straight line in a well-boxed valley and collecting the discharge (coming from east) of Carcajou Lake, to the outlet (coming from the west) of Toosey lake;

Lower river course (segment of 20.3 kilometres (12.6 mi))

- 5.4 kilometres (3.4 mi) south in a deep valley to the outlet (coming from the east) of Lake Mitchell;
- 6.9 kilometres (4.3 mi) to the south in a deep valley collecting the outlet (coming from the east) from Lac à la Vase, to the brook à la Martre, corresponding to a bend in the river;
- 5.6 kilometres (3.5 mi) in a deep valley by first forming a hook of 1.0 kilometre (0.62 mi) towards the west, then towards the south, and forming another hook of 0.8 kilometres (0.50 mi) west, then south, to a stream (coming from the northeast), corresponding to a bend in the river;
- 2.4 kilometres (1.5 mi) south-west to its mouth where the current bypasses an island.

The Tourilli river flows in a bend on the east bank of the Sainte-Anne river. This confluence is located 14.1 kilometres (8.8 mi) west of the course of the Jacques-Cartier River, 22.2 kilometres (13.8 mi) north of the center of the village of Saint-Raymond and 74.6 kilometres (46.4 mi) north of the confluence of the Sainte-Anne with the St. Lawrence River.

From this confluence, the current descends on 109.1 kilometres (67.8 mi) generally south and southwest following the course of the Sainte-Anne river, to the northwest bank of the St. Lawrence River.

== Toponymy ==
In a mountainous landscape, the profile of the river and its valley sometimes appears in cascades, sometimes in almost vertical walls. This wooded area was long renowned for the richness of its forest species and game, as evidenced by the surveyor John Neilson in 1888.

This toponymic designation, of Aboriginal origin, appears for the first time in a text by the surveyor John Adams in 1829, in the form "Atourile". Two translations are known for this word: "the executioner" and "agitated water"; this latter meaning, linked to the language wendate, seems to have been imposed. The region having been frequented by several Aboriginal nations in the last century, it often happened that several names or meanings were used for the same entity. In addition, on a survey plan dating back to 1854, the Tourille river shape can be noted.

The toponym "Rivière Tourilli" was formalized on December 5, 1968, at the Bank of Place Names of the Commission de toponymie du Québec.

== See also ==
- Laurentides Wildlife Reserve
- La Jacques-Cartier Regional County Municipality
- Lac-Croche, an unorganized territory
- Saint-Gabriel-de-Valcartier, a municipality
- Sainte-Anne River (Mauricie)
- Tourilli Lake
- Gregory Lake
- List of rivers of Quebec

== Bibliography ==
- CAPSA (2014). Plans directeurs de l'eau des secteurs d'intervention de la zone de gestion de la CAPSA: Sainte-Anne, Portneuf et La Chevrotière (Water master plans of the intervention sectors of the CAPSA management area: Sainte-Anne, Portneuf and La Chevrotière) (PDF) (in French). Quebec: CAPSA. p. 691. Archived from the original (PDF) on 2019-02-14.

=== External links ===
- "CAPSA".
