= Chézine North River =

River in Quebec, Canada

Chézine North River Rivière Chézine Nord
- Location within Quebec

Location
- Country: Canada
- Province: Quebec
- Region: Capitale-Nationale
- Regional County Municipality: La Jacques-Cartier
- Unorganized territory and municipality: Lac-Croche and Saint-Gabriel-de-Valcartier

Physical characteristics
- Source: Corbin Lake
  - location: Lac-Croche
  - coordinates: 47.22928°N 71.66492°W
  - elevation: 681 m (2,234 ft)
- Mouth: Chézine
  - location: Saint-Gabriel-de-Valcartier
  - coordinates: 47.1475°N 71.65972°W
  - elevation: 430 m (1,410 ft)
- Length: 29.3 km (18.2 mi)

Basin features
- Tributaries
  - left: (Upward from the mouth) Ruisseau non identifié, décharge du lac Sergiron, décharge du lac Bousset (via le Lac Varrin), décharge du Petit lac Jolly.
  - right: (Upward from the mouth) Ruisseau non identifié, décharge de trois petits lacs non identifiés, ruisseau non identifié, ruisseau non identifié.

The Rivière Chézine Nord (English: Chézine North River) is a tributary of the Chézine flowing in the unorganized territory of Lac-Croche and the municipality of Saint-Gabriel-de-Valcartier, in the La Jacques-Cartier Regional County Municipality, in the administrative region of Capitale-Nationale, in Quebec, in Canada.

The North Chézine River valley is served by secondary forest roads for the needs of forestry and recreational tourism activities.

The main economic activities in the sector are forestry and recreational tourism activities.

The surface of the North Chézine River (except the rapids zones) is generally frozen from the beginning of December to the end of March, but the safe circulation on the ice is generally made from the end of December to the beginning of March. The water level of the river varies with the seasons and the precipitation; the spring flood occurs in March or April.

== Geography ==
The North Chézine River rises at the mouth of Corbin Lake (length: 0.5 kilometres (0.31 mi); altitude 681 metres (2,234 ft)) in the unorganized territory of Lac-Croche. This lake is part of a plateau located between the mountains is fed by only a stream. This lake is located on the southern slope of the watershed with Lake Georgina, located to the north. A mountain peak culminates at 802 metres (2,631 ft) at 1.1 kilometres (0.68 mi) northwest of the lake. The mouth of Lake Corbin is located at:

- 17.6 kilometres (10.9 mi) south-west of the course of the Jacques-Cartier River;
- 14.1 kilometres (8.8 mi) north-west of the confluence of the Chézine with the Sainte-Anne River;
- 39.5 kilometres (24.5 mi) north of the village center of Saint-Raymond;
- 85.7 kilometres (53.3 mi) north of the confluence of the Sainte-Anne river with the Saint-Laurent river.

From the mouth of Lac Corbin, the North Chézine river flows over 29.3 kilometres (18.2 mi) entirely in the forest zone in a deep valley when entering the municipality of Saint-Gabriel-de-Valcartier, to its mouth. This river has a drop of 251 metres (823 ft).

The Chézine river flows into a bend on the north bank of the Chézine river. This confluence is located 2.3 kilometres (1.4 mi) west of the course of the Sainte-Anne river, 19.3 kilometres (12.0 mi) west of the course of the Jacques-Cartier river, 49.8 kilometres (30.9 mi) northwest of downtown Quebec and 78 kilometres (48 mi) north of the confluence of the Sainte- Anne with the St. Lawrence River.

From the confluence of the North Chézine river, the current descends on 6.1 kilometres (3.8 mi) generally south, then south-east, the course of the Chézine river, then on 115.8 kilometres (72.0 mi) generally south and southwest following the course of the Sainte-Anne river, to the northwest shore of the Saint-Laurent river.

== Toponymy ==
The Chézine is a river of the Loire-Atlantique, in France, which flows into the Loire in Nantes. In Quebec, the toponyms "Rivière Chézine", "Rivière Chézine Nord" and "Lac Chézine" are interconnected.

The toponym "Rivière Chézine nord" was formalized on December 5, 1968, at the Place Names Bank of the Commission de toponymie du Québec.

== See also ==
- List of rivers of Quebec

== Bibliography ==
- CAPSA (2014). Plans directeurs de l'eau des secteurs d'intervention de la zone de gestion de la CAPSA: Sainte-Anne, Portneuf et La Chevrotière (English: Water master plans of the intervention sectors of the CAPSA management area: Sainte-Anne, Portneuf and La Chevrotière) (PDF) (in French). Quebec. p. 691. Archived from the original (PDF) on 2019-02-14.
